= Ramsey station (NJ Transit) =

NJ Transit rail station

Ramsey
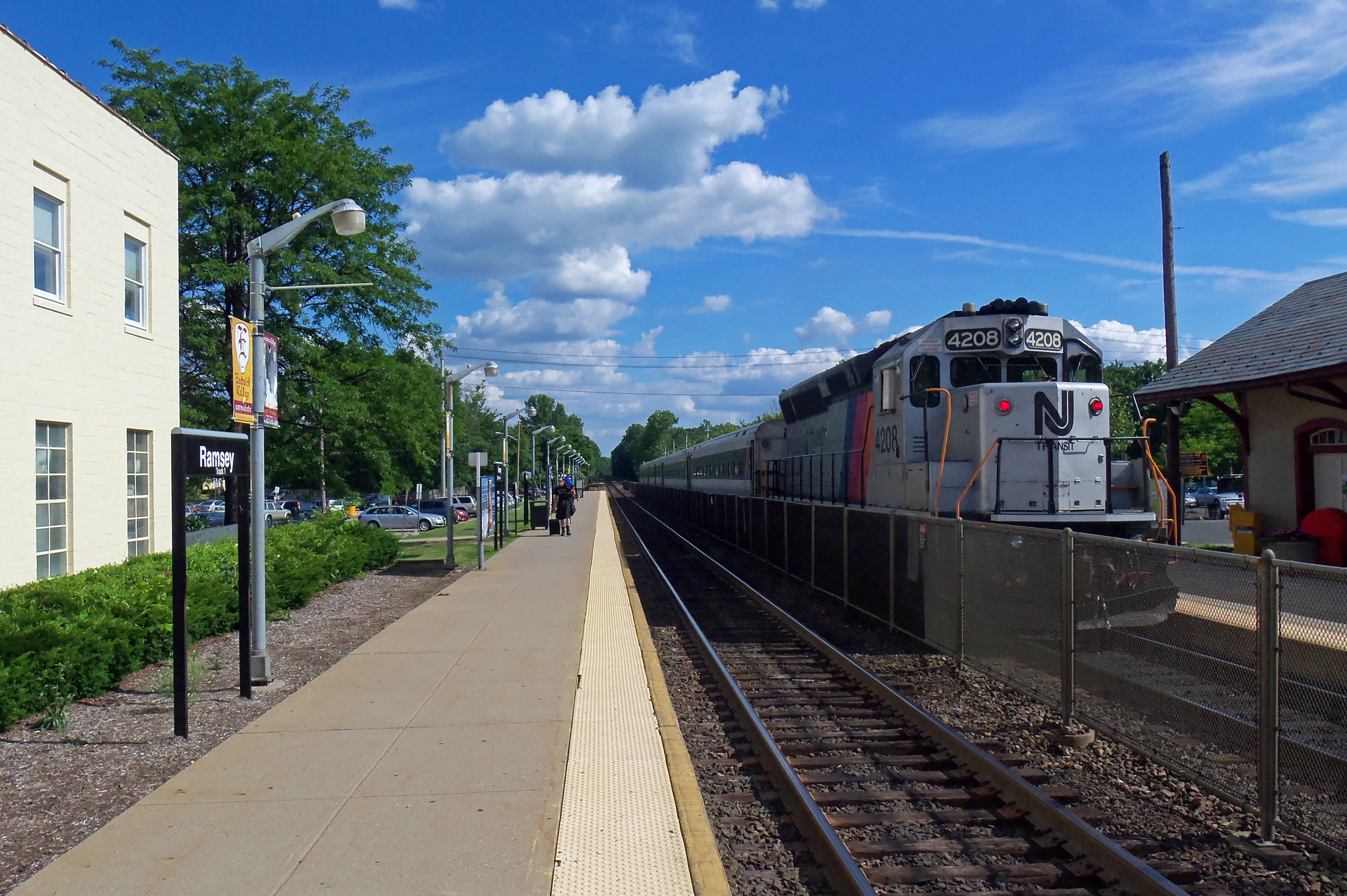
- Train departing for Hoboken, 2011

General information
- Location: Main Street at Erie Plaza, Ramsey, Bergen County, New Jersey 07446
- Coordinates: 41.0568°N 74.1422°W
- Owner: NJ Transit
- Platforms: 2 side platforms
- Tracks: 2

Construction
- Accessible: yes

Other information
- Station code: 2323 (Erie Railroad)
- Fare zone: 12

History
- Opened: October 19, 1848
- Rebuilt: 1868

Passengers
- 2025: 352 (average weekday)
- Rank: 77 of 153

Services
Preceding station	NJ Transit	Following station
Ramsey Route 17 toward Suffern	Main Line	Allendale toward Hoboken
Ramsey Route 17 toward Suffern	Bergen County Line weekdays	Allendale toward Hoboken
Former services
Preceding station	Erie Railroad	Following station
Mahwah toward Chicago	Main Line	Allendale toward Jersey City
Location

Ramsey is one of two railroad stations operated by New Jersey Transit in the borough of Ramsey, Bergen County, New Jersey, United States. Located on the Main Line and Bergen County Line, Ramsey station is also unofficially known as Ramsey – Main Street due to the opening of Ramsey Route 17 station to the north in 2004. The station contains two low-level side platforms.

Railroad service to the Ramsey section of Hohokus Township began on October 19, 1848 as one of two stations in the area. The nearby Westervelt–Ackerson House had a station known as Westervelt's. The Paterson and Ramapo Railroad began service between Jersey City and Suffern, where connection was made to the Erie Railroad main line. The station was built on land donated by Peter J. Ramsey, a local landowner. The Erie Railroad, who took over service, built a new depot at Ramsey in 1868.

== History ==
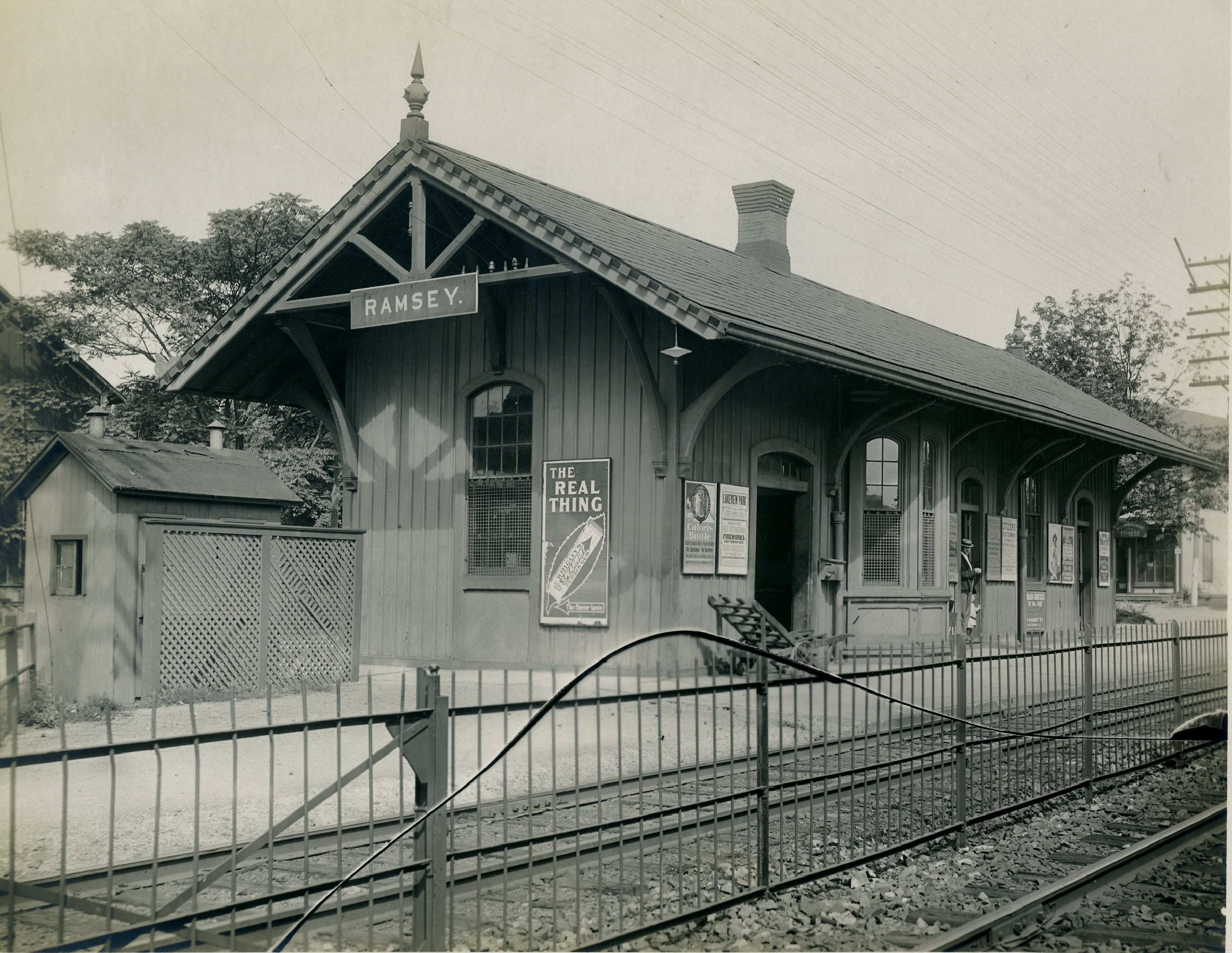
Ramsey station around c. 1907–1912

Construction of the Paterson and Ramapo Railroad in 1848 cut through owned by Peter J. Ramsey, a local landowner in Franklin Township. Ramsey donated the land for the first railroad station in the area, known as Ramsey's. The first train arrived at Ramsey's on October 19, 1848. The construction of the railroad also led to the establishment of a post office in the area. After Ramsey's death in 1854, the land was sold to William Pullis, who turned 22 of the 60 acres (24 ha) to John Dater, a local entrepreneur. Dater worked on opening a store and new structures in the area around Ramsey's station. A local hotel was constructed by David Valentine.

The construction of the Paterson and Ramapo Railroad helped influence the local strawberry industry in Bergen County during the 1840s. The railroad shipped strawberries for local farmers to New York City via Piermont. In 1847, the railroad offered strawberry special trains to help with the delivery of the fruit with nine strawberry cargo cars and two cars for those who wanted to sell their fruit in New York City. Locals in Paterson and Newark requested their own shipments of strawberries and the supply soon met the demand. By the 1850s, Ramsey and nearby Allendale had become the location of most strawberry patches, taking over from Hackensack.

As part of the high demand for strawberries after the American Civil War, the Erie Railroad, now operating the Paterson and Ramapo Railroad, built wooden boxcars that were painted white for the purpose of transporting strawberries. The Erie placed the special boxcars at the Allendale and Ramsey stations. However, the railroads strained the market in Bergen County, noting that the Erie advertised other places to start having their own strawberry farms. They also were delivering people who wanted to move to the area that bought the patches for housing. By the 1870s, the main strawberry crops were coming out of Maplewood and Irvington.

The Erie Railroad began installing two extra tracks from Ridgewood Junction to Suffern, New York in an eastward direction in 1899. As part of it the Ramsey depot would need to be moved as part of construction, along with the station at Ridgewood.

=== Main Street crossing (1927–1947) ===
==== 1927–1930 ====
The borough of Ramsey submitted a plan in April 1927 to widen Main Street through the municipality. The original plan would widen Main Street 20 feet (6.1 m) from the Erie Railroad crossing to Finch Plaza. The Borough Council hosted a meeting on August 9 to discuss the widening. At this meeting, the Borough Council decided that the property owners on Main Street would not be burdened with the construction park, but instead through taxpayers of the entire municipality. The widening proposal contained two different proposals to deal with the Main Street grade crossing of the railroad. The proposals both included making Main Street dead ends for a new crossing not at-grade. The railroad would get new overpass over Main Street, using an example of the ones in Ridgewood.

The Ramsey Citizen's Association held their own meeting on August 11. At their meeting, they discussed the proposal to widen Main Street from Franklin Turnpike to Cherry Lane. They felt that before endorsing any particular proposal, they wanted to know the railroad wanted to do with the Main Street grade crossing.

By November 1927, there was not much progress from the railroad on their plans for the Main Street crossing. The Citizen's Association created their own committee to work on improving the station plaza around Ramsey station. The Citizen's Association felt that passing riders did not get a positive impression of Ramsey because of the aged buildings that surrounded the station on Main Street. They felt that the best buildings offered in the borough were built by the Erie Railroad rather than any local architect. Charles Finch and Edgar DeYoe, the owner of a hotel on Main Street, offered they would help with structure demolition and build new parking lots and stores for people to use in Ramsey. The new committee would develop and design their own plans for a modern Ramsey and beautified station plaza.

Ramsey finished the widening of Main Street from Finch Plaza to the tracks of the North Jersey Rapid Transit line in November. However, any plans to widen from Finch Plaza to the Main Street grade crossing would be held off until Spring 1928 due to the plans to widen it 20 feet (6.1 m) rather than the 6 feet (1.8 m) east of Finch Plaza. By early January 1928, the Citizen's Association was in contact with the railroad about eliminating the Main Street crossing and construction of a new depot in the borough. The Citizen's Association held their annual meeting on January 26, 1928. The focus of the meeting was to work on replacing the railroad station and eliminating the Main Street crossing.

By March 1928, the borough council had over 50 options on what to do with Main Street and its grade crossing, but that any decision on what would happen depended on the decision making of the railroad. There was no information from the railroad to that point about their plans for the Main Street crossing by February 1929 and the Borough Council suggested it was time to arrange a conference with officials of the railroad to find out what their plans were.

==== 1931 hearings ====
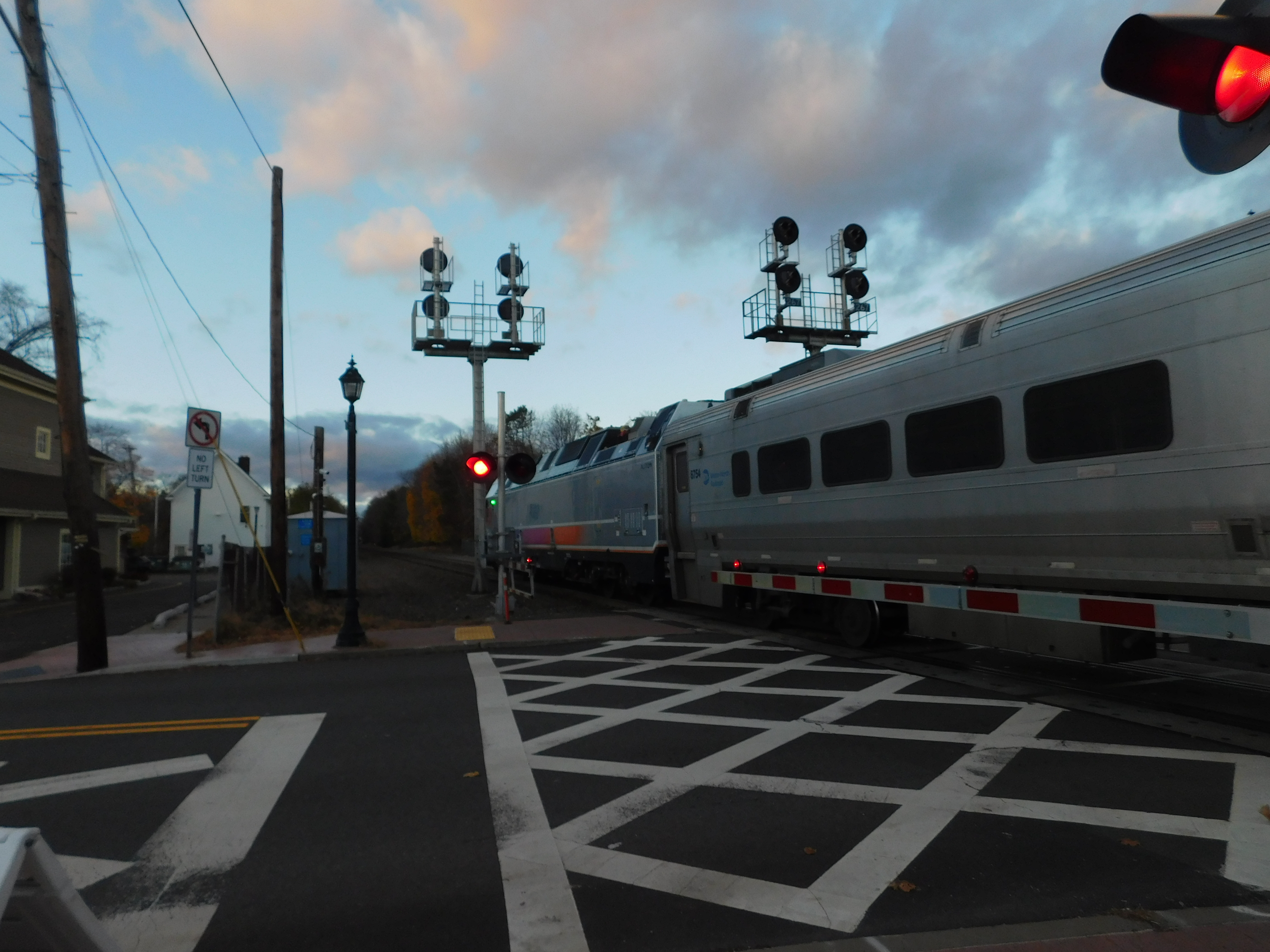
A NJ Transit train blocks the Main Street crossing in November 2024

The plan continued on ice into January 1931, when the Borough Council got word that the New Jersey State Public Utilities Commission (PUC) would be holding a hearing on February 11, 1931 about the elimination of grade crossings in the state. Ramsey officials were in agreement that they should attend the Newark hearing with some plans. James Conklin, the Borough Engineer, and the county engineers had meetings about the proposed elimination of the Main Street crossing. However, they had different opinions on how to handle it. One was to make Main Street underpass the tracks. The other proposal was to depress the Erie Railroad tracks through Ramsey, resulting in Main Street crossing over. Conklin stated that he made arrangements between the county and Erie officials to discuss proposals on January 30, 1931.

Bergen County officials also did checks on the vehicle rate on the Main Street crossing. They stated that it was the 28th most used crossing in the county, resulting in 114 trains obstructing Main Street for 211 minutes in a 24-hour period. However, the preference of the state of New Jersey was to eliminate grade crossings on main lines first rather than branch lines, moving the Ramsey crossing to 12th in the county.

Ramsey officials were agreed on the idea that the railroad tracks through Ramsey should depressed from the current altitude. However, they determined that the short term relief would be unhelpful to people in Ramsey and suggested that the Erie Railroad main should cross on an overpass or Main Street overpass instead. This would involve a direct connection with Mechanic and Prospect Streets. Bergen County officials told Conklin that they would prefer that option over a full track depression. However, the PUC postponed the meeting to March 16.

The railroad noted at the March 16 hearing that they opposed the depression plan due to the expensive costs. Other proposals were offered by the borough, including using the site of a former hotel and building a ramp over the tracks near Carroll Street and the Main Street overpass, which met local opposition due to concerns about depressing property values along Main Street.

With a second hearing on the Main Street elimination set for April 9, the Borough Council held a meeting on April 1 to discuss their plans. Along with Conklin, Mayor John Sullivan, Borough Attorney Walter Weber and other Ramsey officials would be present at the meeting in Newark with two proposals: one each building a bridge crossing north or south of Main Street, with a final decision to be left to the railroad.

On August 27, the PUC announced that they were considering the elimination of 16 crossings at the cost of $3,481,580. This would include of $300,000 to eliminate the Main Street crossing in Ramsey.

==== Delays ====
Despite the order from the Public Utilities Commission, the organization announced on October 21, 1932 that the crossing would not be worked on for at least one year. The PUC stated that the Route 2 crossing would be a higher priority. The Main Street crossing already had 24 hours per day watching of the gates and that the railroad was not guaranteed to eliminate that crossing at all. The railroad would not be able to pay for 50% of the cost of the grade crossing elimination and it factored into the decision.

The progress on the Route 2 crossing was slow in 1933 with a hearing set for September 27, 1933 with the PUC in Newark over the Island Road crossing in Ramsey. This would be closed because of the new Route 2 bridge and the made the Island Road crossing superfluous. Ramsey stated that they would oppose the closing of the Island Road crossing because of the lack of pedestrian crossing on Route 2 with the new bridge. As part of the opposition they would use it to demand the abolition of the Main Street crossing as well with keeping the Island Road one open. Despite their efforts, the Island Road crossing would be shut upon completion of the Route 2 bridge.

The borough restarted efforts on December 11, 1934. The Ramsey Borough Council and Mayor Sullivan received a letter from the local fire department about the Main Street crossing blocking firefighting efforts when a train was at the station when heading from the west side of Ramsey to the east. Mayor Sullivan noted that the Public Works Administration would have grants available to help get funding for the crossing elimination. They also decided to let the railroad kow about the situation and update the flagman absolute situations like that. Emmett Drew, the secretary of the Public Utility Commissioners, notified Ramsey Borough Council later in December that the Main Street crossing would be included in their list of projects for Public Works Administration grants. The Public Works Administration noted in a separate letter that the borough could not be guaranteed funding from the current set, but would be offered in the new funding if Congress provided it. As for the complaints from the fire department, the railroad stated that engineers would not be able to stop a train in time before the station when seeing the flagman to help clear the crossing.

In February, the Erie Railroad agreed to have the engineers clear the Main Street crossing when stopping at Ramsey station. As part of the agreement, the fire department would be in charge of confirming that trains were clear at all times. However, by the beginning of March, Chief William Winter told the Borough Council that the railroad violated the agreement on a regular basis, providing a list of infractions to the Council. The Borough Council continued to push the railroad to follow the agreement as Alex Mitchell, the Fire Commissioner, noted that an afternoon eastbound train blocked fire trucks despite being visible to the passing train and did not move forward. The train blocked the fire truck from responding to a local brush fire, preventing a quicker response. The continued complaints from the municipality irritated Erie Railroad officials, who threatened engineers with wage suspensions if they continued to block the Main Street grade crossing. The problem did not relieve itself by October. The fire department asked Mayor Dwight Little to write the railroad yet again about trains blocking the Main Street crossing.

In September, Emmett Drew mailed a letter to the municipality stating that the Main Street crossing would not be in the next set of projects for federal funding because all the Erie Railroad funding had been used for 1936. Drew stated that the project would be considered in the future for funding.

==== Revival after World War II ====
Proposals to eliminate the Main Street crossing were shelved through the early 1940s. In January 1945, the Public Utility Commissioners announced in their annual report that the Main Street crossing would be one of 12 crossings in the county they would ask to be eliminated. The project would continue to cost $300,000 as the previous estimate. By early 1946, the continuous problems with the Erie Railroad blocking the Main Street crossing continued, despite continuous promises they would keep the crossing clear. The borough also complained about the railroad not blowing whistles in the correct time period.

Another Public Utilities Commission hearing for the Main Street crossing came on April 23, 1946. At this meeting, Mayor Franklin Haring, Borough Attorney Romeo Napolitano and Conklin attended representing the borough. At the hearing, the PUC discarded all the statistical analysis from 1931 and decided it was time to restart the case with fresh statistics about the Main Street crossing. The PUC scheduled a new hearing for June 18.

At the June 18 hearing, the borough provided new statistics. Along with 2,000 pedestrians, 4,000 vehicles and 70 trains used the crossing in Ramsey. The railroad's version of the same study added 500 pedestrians and ten more trains. These delays would be an average of 75 minutes per day for those held up by trains, with the largest an eight minute blockage. Conklin provided a new design for an underpass that would take traffic from Main Street near the fire station to Central Avenue, where traffic would merge back onto Main Street. At a meeting with the Borough Council, Conklin stated that the railroad and Public Utilities Commission came with an estimate of $400,000 for elimination of the Main Street crossing. As part of this, the state of New Jersey would pay $200,000 and the railroad would pay the rest.

At a Borough Council meeting on November 26, Napolitano told the officials that the Erie Railroad opposed every proposal the borough of Ramsey made. There were three plans, ranging from $349,000–$560,000 to eliminate the grade crossing. The railroad stated that the railroad would only get a 5% benefit on a project in which they would have to pay for 50% of the work.

200 people showed up a meeting at Ramsey High School on August 5, 1947 to discussion reviving the old plans to widen Main Street and eliminate the crossing. However, locals were unsupportive of the proposed Conklin designs. They wanted to build a crossing at Prospect Street. A week later, officials held a meeting at Ramsey's municipal building on August 12. Opposition voiced concerns against the Prospect Street overpass, stating that it would harm children in the area with the increased traffic. They also felt that eliminating the Main Street grade crossing in Ramsey would cause the same property value damage it caused it in Allendale and Waldwick. They felt that the railroad cutting off the business district would be a mistake. Mayor Franklin Haring and former Mayor John Sullivan appeared at the meeting and voted to approve a referendum to deal with the Main Street crossing.

=== Station plaza expansion (1947–1952) ===
==== West lot negotiations (1947–1950) ====
With the growth of commuter parking on the Erie Railroad in Ramsey, parking became problematic in the borough. In September 1947, then-Police Commissioner Chester Smeltzer announced a deal with John Dater, a local newspaper publisher to use a 190 feet (58 m) parcel south of the Erie depot for expanded parking for 150–175 vehicles. This deal would result in the borough renting property for $1 per year. This new lot would have a 20-foot (6.1 m) long strip of asphalt down to Cleveland Street and 20 feet (6.1 m) wide to Maple Street. As part of the construction, Cleveland Street, then a dirt road, would be resurfaced for the new lot. Smeltzer stated he would ask the Ramsey Borough Council to pay for the work and make one of the existing lots used only for shopping rather than commuters.

At the Borough Council meeting on October 14, 1947, the Borough Engineer laid out a new 125-vehicle parking lot on the Dater property. Smeltzer noted that they wanted to get an easement on the Dater property to allow for an egress point to Maple Street on a future date, but Dater declined the request. As part of the plans, the borough would begin a rough grade for the new parking lot in 1947 and work on a resurfacing in 1948. Mayor Franklin Harding agreed to request estimates for construction. After the completion of work, Smeltzer stated that Depot Plaza would be banned from being used as parking due to traffic problems with trains arriving at the station.

However, the deal hit a snag in December 1947 when Dater requested that an old agreement between him and Mayor Dwight Little be finished. Dater would not sign the deal until the municipality worked on improving the intersection of Ackerman, Woodland and Wyckoff Avenues next to Dater's property and remove debris from a nearby drainage ditch that ran next to his property. At the Borough Council meeting on December 9, the Borough Council agreed to remove the commitment for the intersection improvement while Smeltzer stated he would talk with Dater about changing his mind.

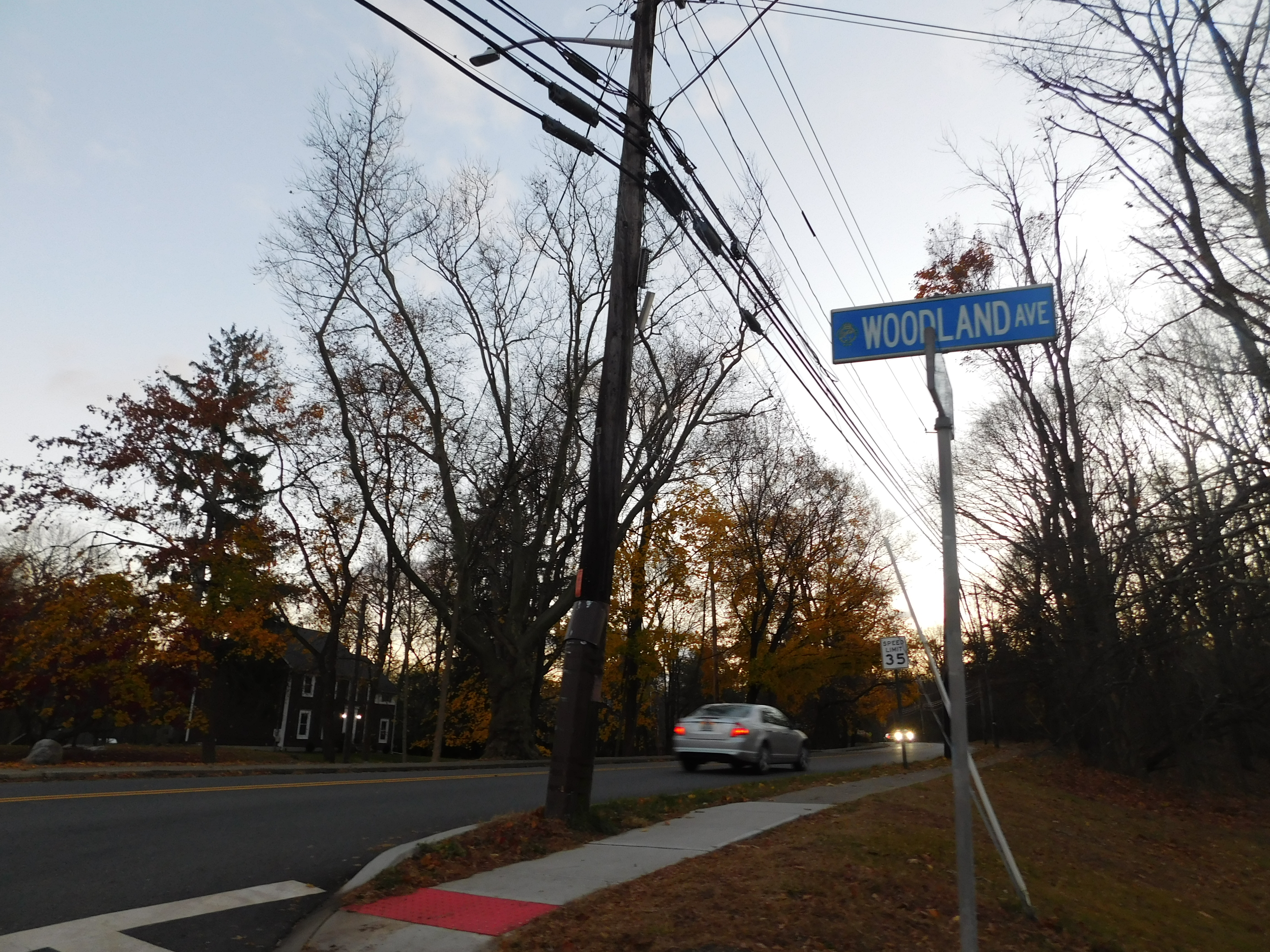
The junction of Wyckoff Avenue and Woodland Avenue, part of the junction Dater requested be re-aligned

Dater held out signing the agreement until May 1948, when Councilman William Halsted failed to get support for dropping negotiations over the property. While Halsted stated that cleaning up the drainage ditch would only take two workers, he stated his concern that Dater would find another excuse to delay signing the deal. The meeting got heated between Smeltzer and Halsted over remarks made by the latter and after arguing, the Borough Council agreed to act on the 1937 agreement between Dater and the Little administration. Construction began in late May 1948 at the intersection of Wyckoff and Woodland Avenues to appease Dater's side of the deal. By May 28, the drainage ditch near the Dater property had been cleaned and the agreement would be done pending the completion of the realignment of Wyckoff and Woodland Avenue.

On July 24, 1948, the Erie Railroad agreed to work with the borough to grade and surface the Dater property for parking, but did not agree with Borough Engineer James Conklin over a proposal to lower the station plaza and resurface it to work with the new parking lot. As part of this proposal, a new curb would be built to protect cars from going onto the tracks at the new parking lot. At the Borough Council meeting on July 27, Smeltzer directed the borough attorney to meet with Dater to ensure his signature on the agreement for the new lot.

After over a year of negotiation, construction of the new parking lot on the Dater property began in early December 1948. Halsted, who was the Road Commissioner for Ramsey, oversaw the construction. Construction on the parking lot completed in 1949 except for lighting the south end of the property, which required another agreement with Dater. In August 1950, Rockland Power and Light came to an agreement to run wires to help illuminate the parking lot.

==== East lot and station plaza (1950–1952) ====
However, even with the new parking lot, Ramsey still faced parking issues. By July 1950, Ramsey had come up with a new plan to widen Spruce Street between East Main Street and Carol Street to help with parking. As part of this, parking would be made available on Spruce Street for shoppers to use. However, this proposal died on July 11 when Conklin stated that the cost for all those spots on Spruce Street would cost $80 a piece for 35–40 vehicles. On top of the expensive cost, there was general concern about shoppers wanting to park a far distance from the shopping center.

With the rejection of the Spruce Street proposal, the decision making turned to construction of more parking lots in the area, including replacing the parking lot between East Main Street and Church Streets, sold to become part of a new supermarket. As part of the agreement with the owner, Ramsey only maintained a month-based lease on the property. With that parking lot to vanish, the idea was to offer a new parking lot on the east side of the Erie Railroad tracks. There also were discussions with a group of local property owners to acquire some land on that side of the tracks for a new parking lot. The principal land owner on that tract was John Dater and that discussions were occurring to purchase property from him for 130–150 spaces of parking. With concerns about the ability to negotiate the land in a timely fashion, Smeltzer, now the Mayor of Ramsey, pressed to have negotiations added.

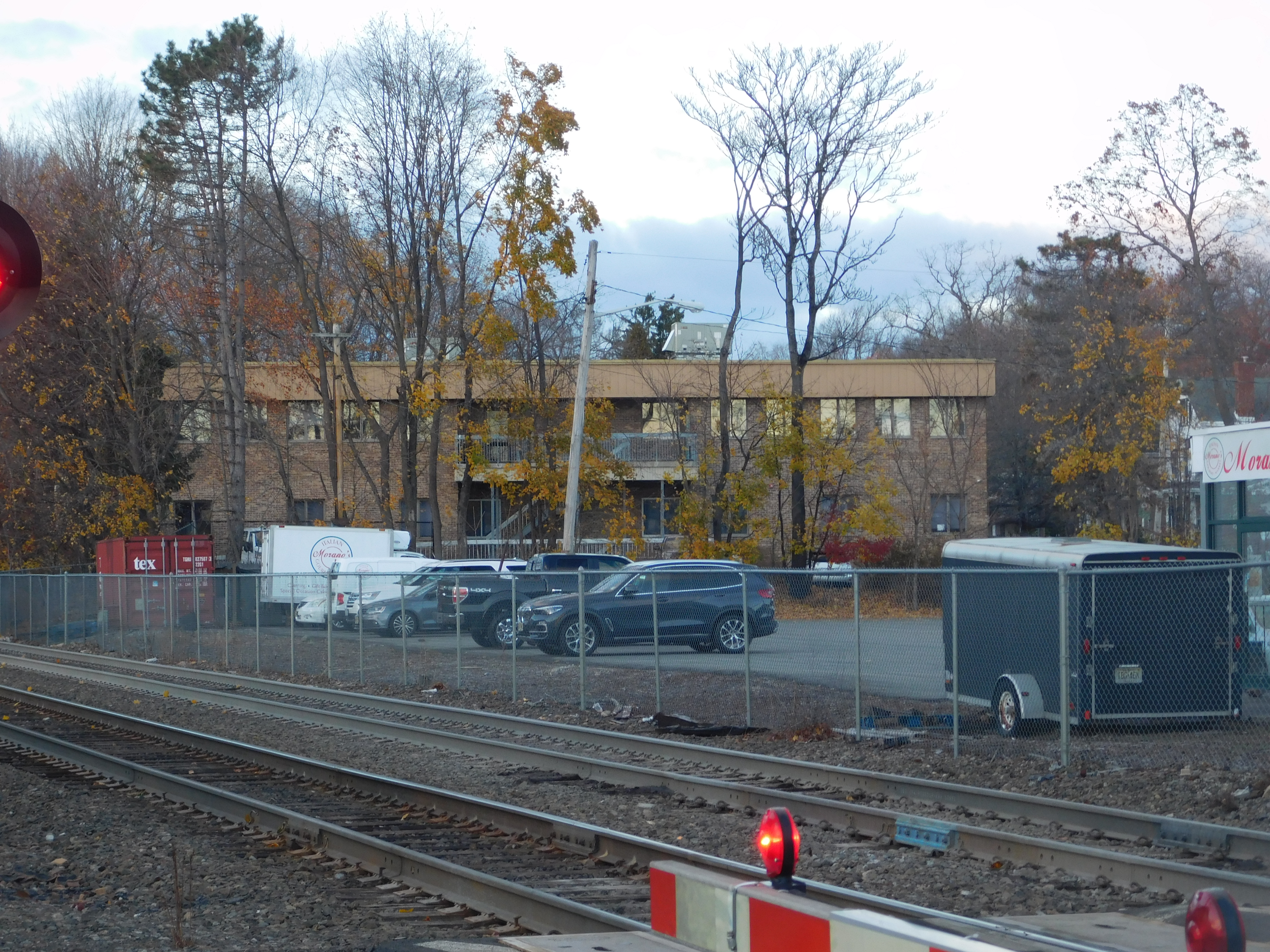
The site of the former northbound station platform in November 2024

With Dater's death on December 8, 1950, negotiations to moved to working with his son, John Dater, Jr., on acquiring the property for a new parking lot on both sides of the railroad tracks. In January 1951, Ramsey Borough Council considered an offer from Dater, Jr. about the purchase of two properties for a total of $14,500. One area would be the previous ask of Dater, Sr. about the egress to Maple Street from 1948 to help relieve traffic out of the new parking lot. This would be $10,000 of the price. The rest would be part of the tract on the east side of the tracks for $4,500.

As part of the negotiations in April 1951, the borough would commit to $30,000 for acquiring property on both sides of the tracks along with their drainage systems. As part of this agreement, Ramsey Borough Council hoped it would help the borough get a requested move of the northbound station platform to the south of side of Main Street, a local freight shed moved from the east side of the railroad to the west and have a freight spur removed entirely before construction of new parking lots.

At a meeting on August 3, 1951 in Jersey City, Smeltzer, Conklin, Dater, Jr., Borough Attorney James Muth and Dater's attorney, Otto Saalfeld, Jr. hashed out deals to help acquire new parking for Ramsey station with Erie Railroad officials. As part of the negotiations, the railroad agreed to remove the freight spur. Dater agreed to give up 1,600 square feet (150 m^{2}) of land to have the eastbound platform moved south of Main Street. In agreement as well would be that the railroad would give up maintenance of Station Plaza, owned by the railroad. The construction of the new parking lots would involve lowering the plaza down 6 inches (15 cm) to reach Main Street at the same grade level and construction of a new water drain. Station Plaza would be resurfaced and the 1948 proposed exits would be opened onto Maple Street. With the moving of the freight shed and the removal of the rail spur, 200 more vehicles could be accommodated for parking in Ramsey. However, due to financial limits, a widening of Mechanic Street would have to be put off, despite being necessary for the project because of rush hour parking.

With the work still in negotiation, Ramsey officials agreed to continue a monthly lease on a property for what would become the future post office in the municipality to provide parking. This would continue until the new lots were built to accommodate parking in Ramsey. Smeltzer reported that the proposals hatched at the August 3 meeting were being studied by the Erie Railroad. With a race against the weather, bids for the construction of new drainage came in September 1951. Six different bids came in on the project, which would involve the construction of 264 feet (80 m) of 42-inch (110 cm) wide pipes along with 4,800 square feet (450 m^{2}) of fill and two catch basins. The bids ranged from $6,000–$7,000 and higher. Three of the bids were rejected without a given reason.

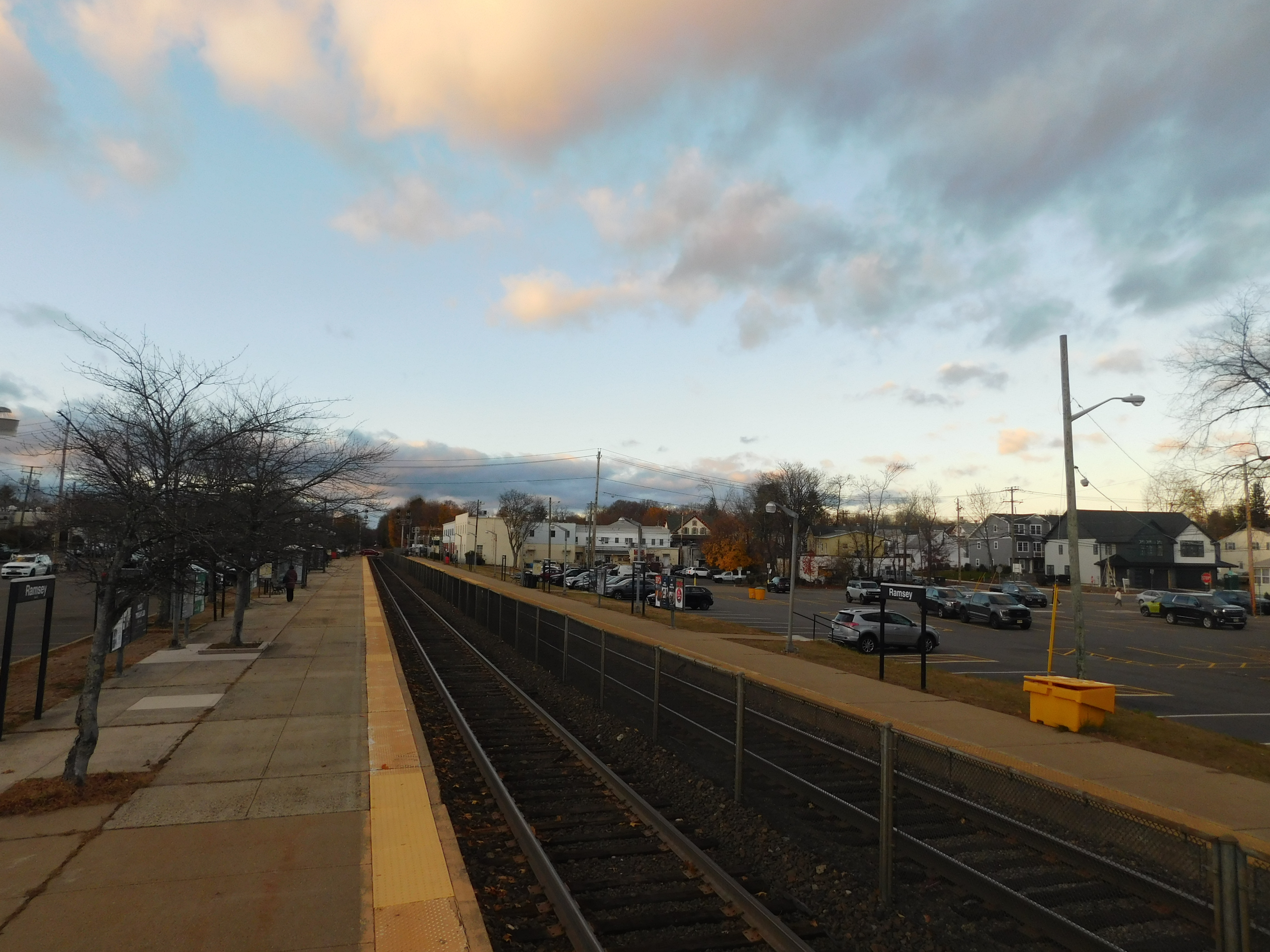
The lot constructed in 1952 in November 2024

By November 1951, land acquisition appeared to be down to a property trade involving three different entities, the railroad, Dater, Jr. and the municipality. As part of the deal, a 23-by-350-foot (7.0 m × 106.7 m) stretch alongside the Erie Railroad tracks north of Main Street would be acquired by the municipality and then transferred to the railroad in return for a similar parcel of land on the southern side of the crossing, where the freight shed and siding were. As part of the deal, Smeltzer stated that the firehouse on North Central Avenue would be moved to Maple Street on municipal land and the old firehouse would be turned over to the railroad. However, the fire station and its land were property of the Ramsey Fire Department Association and not the municipality itself.

At the Borough Council meeting on December 26, Smeltzer said the railroad and municipality were in agreement to remove the freight spur and shed, along with the relocation of the platform. They also stated that they would get the Erie's permission to lower the grade of the parking lot and instal curbing for the new platform and its sidewalk. The Borough Council asked Muth to create an agreement draft for the railroad to fix the grade and pay Dater, Jr. $11,500 as the last payment for the purchase of his father's land. 17 acres (6.9 ha) of land were being offered by resident Rachel Goetschlus to help expand the new Mechanic Street parking lot.

Smeltzer resigned as mayor on February 26, 1952 and talked about his meeting with railroad officials over a municipal rumor that the railroad rejected the deal to move the platform. Smeltzer stated that the decision would be made in Cleveland, Ohio, where the company's engineers were located. By April 1952, the constant rumors had caused a Borough Council meeting to boil over. Local resident Pat Gentempo, who was also a representative of the Ramsey Chamber of Commerce, stated he was concerned about the rumors running up and down Main Street about the lack of progress by the railroad. Councilman George Shurter helped explain to Gentempo that the railroad agreed to do everything and that the railroad would be in charge of getting things done. The railroad also stated that poor weather conditions had caused delays in construction. By April 22, construction would begin on the parking lot.

At the end of April 1952, negotiations occurred between Borough Council and the railroad. The railroad sent proposals for the stations to the Borough Council. The borough council added their own supplemental ideas to the construction. Along with the previously agreed to terms, the municipality wanted to have the railroad construct a new shelter on the platform that would cover the entire northbound platform. The additional one would be the proposed grade reduction and new gutter for drainage. The proposal did not have the freight shed being moved to the opposite side of tracks and rumors were that the railroad would probably remove the freight shed entirety. The Borough Council agreed to the Erie Railroad's changes and that the borough should add some money for the railroad into the project.

The new station plaza and parking area opened in December 1952, with Rockland Electric Company installing lights in the plaza. A new taxi stand opened as part of the new station plaza and parking was not permitted for anyone else. The new parking lots would result in Main Street entrances becoming one-way to help reduce traffic. All commuter parking would be removed from the post office lot.

=== Restoration (1978–1982) ===
In August 1978, the New Jersey State Transportation Commissioner Louis Gambaccini stated that he would be working to purchase 11 train stations in Bergen County from Conrail then lease them to the municipalities for $1 per year. Ramsey Mayor Emil Porfido announced at a Borough Council meeting in February 1979 that he had multiple ideas for use of the 1868 station depot. This would include using it for events for seniors and youth and health clinics, turning it into a community center. He also offered that he would allow a concession company for customers to take advantage of, along with the ticket sales. Ramsey's borough engineer and inspector checked the depot in April 1979 and stated that the depot would need some renovation before it could be used for Porfido's interests.

In November 1979, Porfido noted that the state would pay for a new parking lot at Ramsey station on North Central Avenue to reduce problems on Route 17. With the construction proposed of a new convenience store on Route 17, Porfido and Councilwoman Eleanor Rooney noted that commuters would lose a parking lot for their vehicles. The new parking lot would contain 160–190 spaces for commuters and be free of charge at the beginning. The parking lot on Route 17 closed in December and Ramsey announced a new parking lot for bus riders would open at the Ramsey Industrial Mall on Spring Street in March 1980. At that time, Porfido announced that the federal subsidy for a new parking lot on North Central Avenue would soon be coming their way.

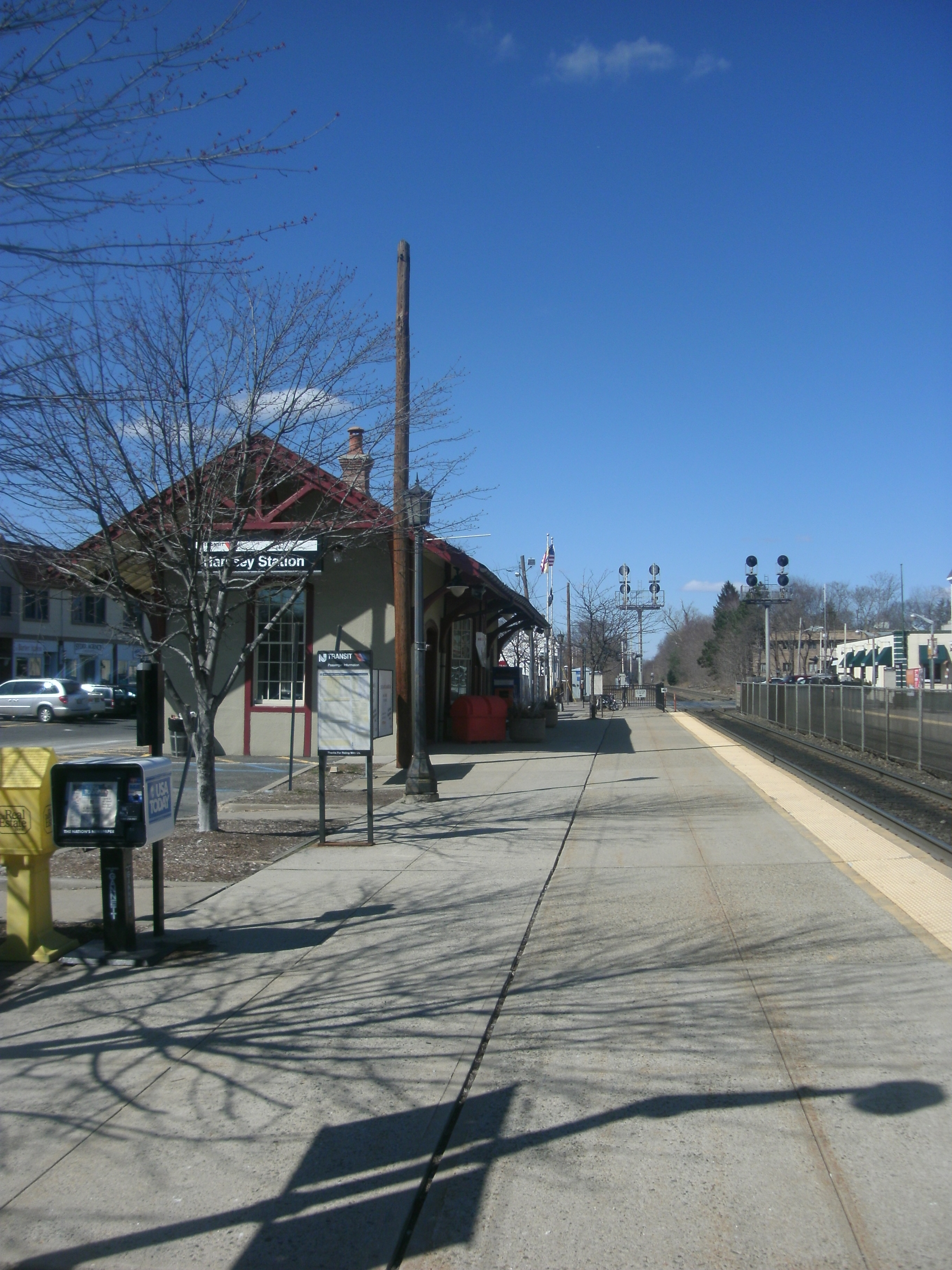
Ramsey station in March 2011 with the 1868 station depot

On September 10, 1980, Porfido announced that they came to an agreement with the state to lease the depot at Ramsey station. The deal included undisclosed sums of state money to do the renovate and repair the structure along with the $1 per year deal to lease it. Porfido reiterated that it would be used as a community center. The station renovations would including repair of the slate roof, replacement of gutters and a new coat of paint. The station would receive new lighting and both platforms would be resurfaced and extended. A sixty-car parking lot would be paved for commuters to use. Porfido said the deal would be complete by early 1981 with renovations finished in June. Porfido also stated that the new parking lot on North Central Avenue would be released for bids on September 26 by the Federal Highway Administration. This new parking lot would be 2.6 acres (1.1 ha) and contain 175 spaces for commuters. The new lot would also have lights and a walkway to Ramsey station. Construction of the new lot would begin in the autumn of 1980.

NJ Transit's Board of Directors approved the renovations at Ramsey and in nearby Park Ridge in November 1980. The approval noted that the ticket office would move towards the end of the depot, with the former ticket office and baggage room becoming the community center. The depot would receive two restrooms and as well, all at a cost of $60,000 (1980 USD) from the 1979 transportation bond issue. Conrail and its subcontractors would be the firm involve in construction.

Construction of the parking lot and depot renovation finished in July 1981. The borough, Gambaccini and others held a dedication ceremony on July 9. Gambaccini and Martin Robins, the Associate Executive director of NJ Transit presented a framed sketch of the renovated Ramsey depot. The dedication came at the same time as Conrail announced they would be removing two tracks between Ridgewood and the New York state line. Porfido received a certificate from the Bergen County Board of Freeholders in September 1982 for his efforts to save and restore the station depot. The Historical Sites Advisory Board also commended Porfido for the preservation.

=== Parking concerns (1994–2004) ===
The Ramsey Borough Council met with NJ Transit in March 1994 to discuss their opposition to the plan for the construction of a new parking lot at the station. As part of construction of a new station in Secaucus, NJ Transit would ask municipalities along the Main, Pascack Valley and Bergen County lines to construct expanded parking lots for a possible 60% increase of ridership. Borough Council officials felt there was a disproportion in the requests for expanded parking based on population. Ramsey station would need a 200-space lot, while Mahwah, which had a larger population, would only need a 100-space lot. Borough officials felt that the parking in Ramsey already was sufficient for ridership at the station and that adding spaces would gridlock the borough.

Ramsey Borough Council made a counterproposal, suggesting that NJ Transit should build a station on the Ramsey–Mahwah municipal line next to Route 17 with adequate parking. This decision would reduce stress on both Mahwah and Ramsey to build new parking.

In early May 1994, Ramsey Mayor John Scerbo enlisted the help of State Senator Gerald Cardinale of Demarest. Scerbo noted that NJ Transit found the alternative proposal too expensive to construct. While NJ Transit would pay for either proposal, Ramsey officials were concerned about the congestion that more commuters and parking would result in. One councilman requested that NJ Transit's proposal would turn downtown Ramsey into Jersey City and another councilman, David Bisaillon wanted NJ Transit to explore alternatives to their plans. NJ Transit officials noted that they would work with Ramsey Borough officials to make a deal that would work with both sides.

Thomas Leathem, a Ramsey resident, also did a study that 30% of commuters parking at Ramsey's lots of 500 spaces combined were not from Ramsey. He recommended that the use of public pressure would be better for the Ramsey Borough Council rather than spend money on court costs. Scerbo enlisted the help of Charlotte Vandervalk, a State Assemblywoman from Montvale, to work with Cardinale on their demands. NJ Transit stated that putting 200 new spaces in Ramsey borough would cost $4 million while construction of the station on Route 17 would cost $12 million.

NJ Transit told the Ramsey Borough Council on May 25 that the plan for more construction near Ramsey station would be the plan they would proceed with. NJ Transit's new plan was for 300 spaces on North Central Avenue, consisting of 1.6 acres (0.65 ha). Ramsey's opposition was that it was close to already congested streets in Ramsey and that it worsen the problem. They reiterated their interest in building a new station at Ferguson Place and Route 17, closing the downtown station in the process. This new station would have 1,200 parking spaces for commuters to use.

NJ Transit opposed stating that the lumber yard at the site was not for sale and they would need to spend $10 million to buy the required land and build the station and parking. An aide of Cardinale stated that NJ Transit could condemn the lot for purchase if it was in the best interest of the state. Vandervalk added that NJ Transit could lease or sell the land for their purposes and that she would want to know what senior management at the agency thought of the lumber site proposal. Ramsey Councilman Joseph Pojanowski reiterated that they would not back from their opposition, but were willing to work with NJ Transit on an adequate solution.

In July 1994, Scerbo, Pojanowski and Councilwoman Cynthia Porter and NJ Transit officials held a walking tour during rush hour in downtown Ramsey. This tour went along Main Street, Gertzen Plaza and Finch Park, along with Ramsey station. Pojanowski stated that at least one NJ Transit official recognized the use of the lumber yard as an exit ramp from the proposed parking lot would be problematic. However, traffic at the station was low the day of the tour because of various circumstances, resulting in a different situation than standard for Ramsey residents. The borough administrator stated that NJ Transit was discussing options and they would have to wait until then.

In January 1995, Pojanowski and other Ramsey officials started working on getting neighboring municipalities on their side of the fight. Pojanowski helped sway officials in Mahwah to support the proposal for a new station at Route 17. Pojanowski also went to neighboring Saddle River, whose officials supported the idea of a new station rather than adding parking at Mahwah and Ramsey. Saddle River's administrator Charles Cuccia said they would pass a supporting resolution at their next Borough Council meeting. Scerbo asked Pojanowski to start garnering support from Allendale and Upper Saddle River for their proposal.

At a Ramsey Borough Council meeting on March 8, at least one local resident noted that moving the train station to Route 17 and closing the downtown Ramsey station would be a mistake. He argued that moving the station would damage downtown Ramsey by businesses away from downtown and add to the traffic on Route 17, already at a breaking point. Scerbo stated that they wanted to not move the station and leave things alone, but NJ Transit forced their hand.

Ramsey officials met with NJ Transit at their headquarters in Newark on October 11 to further pressure the agency to not build the extra parking lot. They added that over 1,300 residents of the borough signed a petition denoting their opposition to the new lot. At that time, NJ Transit noted that the lumber yard for the proposed parking lot was up for sale, preventing the use of condemnation. NJ Transit insisted they wanted to work with Ramsey on this new lot and were going to make a decision soon. They did reject closing the downtown Ramsey station, claiming it would reduce ridership.

Pojanowski addressed the Bergen County Board of Chosen Freeholders in November 1995 to garner support for their proposal over NJ Transit. Members of the Ramsey Borough Council asked Pojanowski to represent them and ask the Board of Chosen Freeholders to do a study on property near the Route 17/Interstate 287 merge in Mahwah, where some land owned by Conrail was for sale. NJ Transit had a deal with the lumber company to purchase the yard for parking. However, they would not enact the deal until NJ Transit's Board of Trustees agreed to it. However, they noted that even if they built the station on Route 17, Ramsey station would still need a parking lot expansion. Freeholders would consider approving a resolution at the next meeting in December.

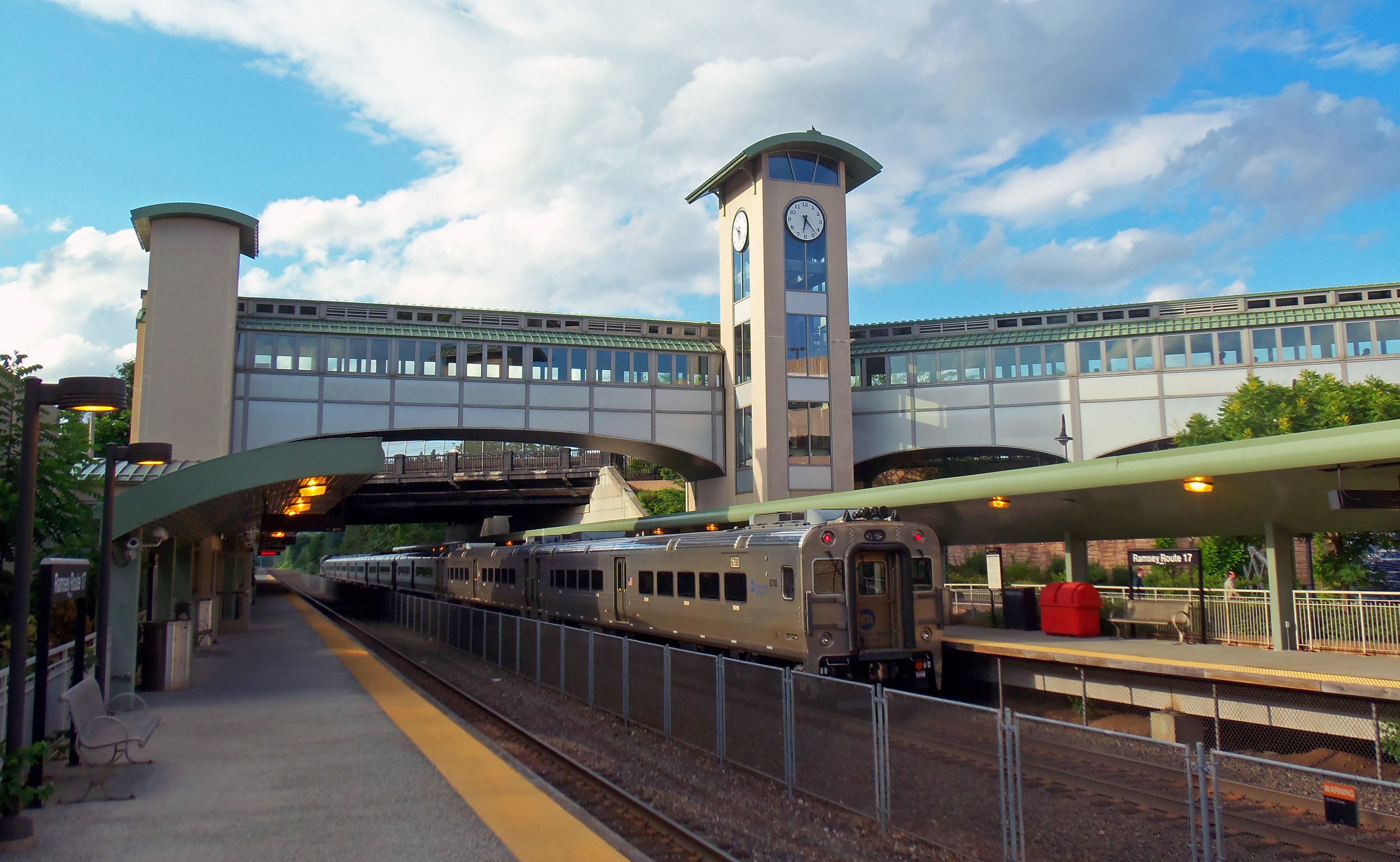
Ramsey Route 17 station in 2011

In December 1995, Scerbo and other Councilmen met with the Chief of Policy of Governor Christine Todd Whitman on their opposition to the construction of the lumber yard lot. A NJ Transit official noted that the land purchase would be dealt with on January 23, 1996 once Whitman's office looks at it the week prior. However, Ramsey officials were able to get NJ Transit hold the land purchase until more proposals for a station at Route 17 were reviewed by officials.

In January 1996, after completing the review, NJ Transit agreed to building a new station on Route 17 near Island road, but that they would still need to build a new parking lot in Ramsey for the anticipated ridership increase. The new station would cost around $9.8 million and expanding in Ramsey would cost $3.5 million.

Delayed due to differences of opinion between Ramsey and Mahwah on its location, NJ Transit gave the go-ahead to begin construction of a $25 million train station and parking garage on Island Road next to Route 17 in May 2002. The project would begin in October 2002 and have a finish date in March 2004. The station, known as Ramsey Route 17, opened on August 22, 2004.

== Station layout and services ==
Ramsey station contains two tracks and two low-level side platforms with two miniature high-level platforms. The two side platforms are connected via Main Street at the railroad crossing. Ramsey station has three separate parking lots, the first of which is on Main Street west of the tracks. The parking lot has 213 spaces, eight of which are accessible for handicapped persons. Maintained by the borough, the lot is permit parking during weekday mornings and afternoons. On evenings and weekend, it is free. The second lot is on the east side of the tracks at the junction of Mechanic Street and Prospect Street. The lot contains 152 spaces, five of which are accessible. The third and final lot is on North Central Avenue, containing 175 spaces, none of which are handicap-accessible. The station has a single ticket vending machine and bicycle parking next to the station depot.

Ramsey station, along with neighboring Allendale, Ho-Ho-Kus and Waldwick stations do not have any connecting bus service. The station is located in fare zone 12 with Ramsey Route 17 station.

== See also ==
- National Register of Historic Places listings in Bergen County, New Jersey
- List of the oldest buildings in New Jersey

== Bibliography ==
- Clayton, W. Woodford (1882). History of Bergen and Passaic Counties, New Jersey with Biographical Sketches of Many of Its Pioneers and Prominent Men. Philadelphia, Pennsylvania: Everts & Peck.
