= Ramsey Route 17 station =

NJ Transit and Metro-North Railroad station

Ramsey Route 17
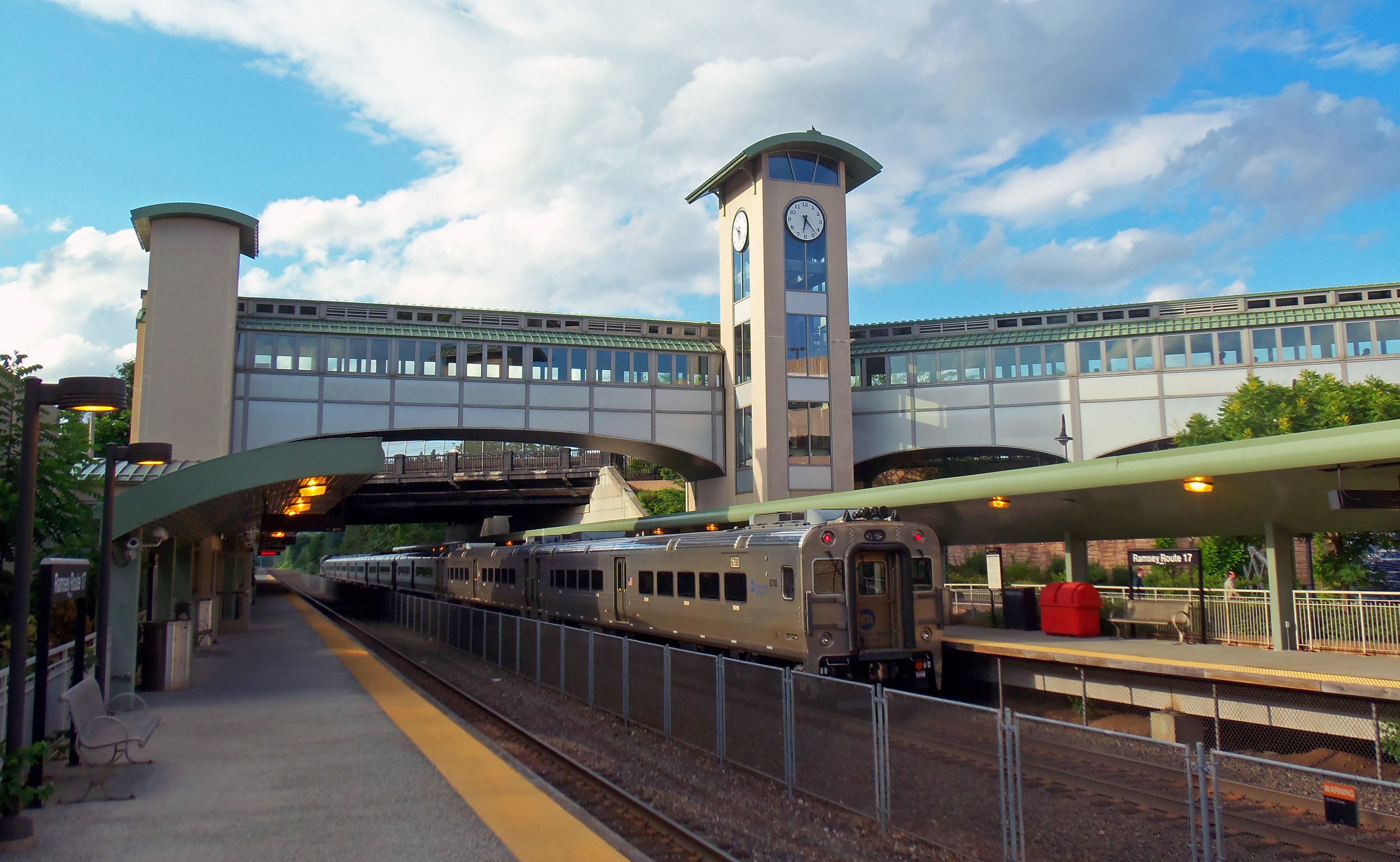
- Westbound train departing Ramsey Route 17 station

General information
- Location: Island Road at Route 17; Ramsey, New Jersey
- Coordinates: 41°04′30″N 74°08′43″W
- Owner: New Jersey Transit
- Line: NJT Main Line
- Platforms: 2 side platforms
- Tracks: 2

Construction
- Parking: 1,221 spaces, 25 accessible spaces
- Accessible: Yes

Other information
- Fare zone: 12

History
- Opened: August 22, 2004

Passengers
- 2025: 499 (average weekday)
- Rank: 58 of 153

Services
Preceding station	NJ Transit	Following station
Mahwah toward Suffern	Main Line	Ramsey toward Hoboken
Mahwah toward Suffern	Bergen County Line weekdays	Ramsey toward Hoboken
Preceding station	Metro-North Railroad	Following station
Suffern toward Port Jervis	Port Jervis Line	Secaucus Junction toward Hoboken
Mahwah (limited service) toward Port Jervis	Port Jervis Line	Secaucus Junction toward Hoboken
Location

Ramsey Route 17 station is an active commuter railroad station in the borough of Ramsey, Bergen County, New Jersey. Located on Island Road off State Route 17, the station serves NJ Transit's Main and Bergen County Lines and Metro-North Railroad's Port Jervis Line, operated by NJ Transit. The station serves as a large park and ride, with a full-size garage on Island Road. Ramsey Route 17 station has two high-level side platforms connected by an overpass. The overpass also connects to the parking garage. It is one of two stops in the borough, with Ramsey–Main Street station to the south being the other.

== History ==
Due to the heavy use of local parking lots at Ramsey and Mahwah, there was demand for a new park-and-ride between those two stations to facilitate better traffic. In 1995, locals approved the construction of a new station at Island Road near the Westervelt–Ackerson House, which at one point was served by a station on the Paterson and Ramapo Railroad, and later, the Erie Railroad. This former station, which started service on October 19, 1848, was known as Westervelt's. Construction began on the new Ramsey Route 17 station in May 2002, and it opened on August 22, 2004.

== Station layout ==
The station has two tracks, each with a high-level side platform. It also has a pedestrian overpass complete with elevators, making it accessible for handicapped persons, and a five-level parking structure which serves as a park and ride.

== Gallery ==
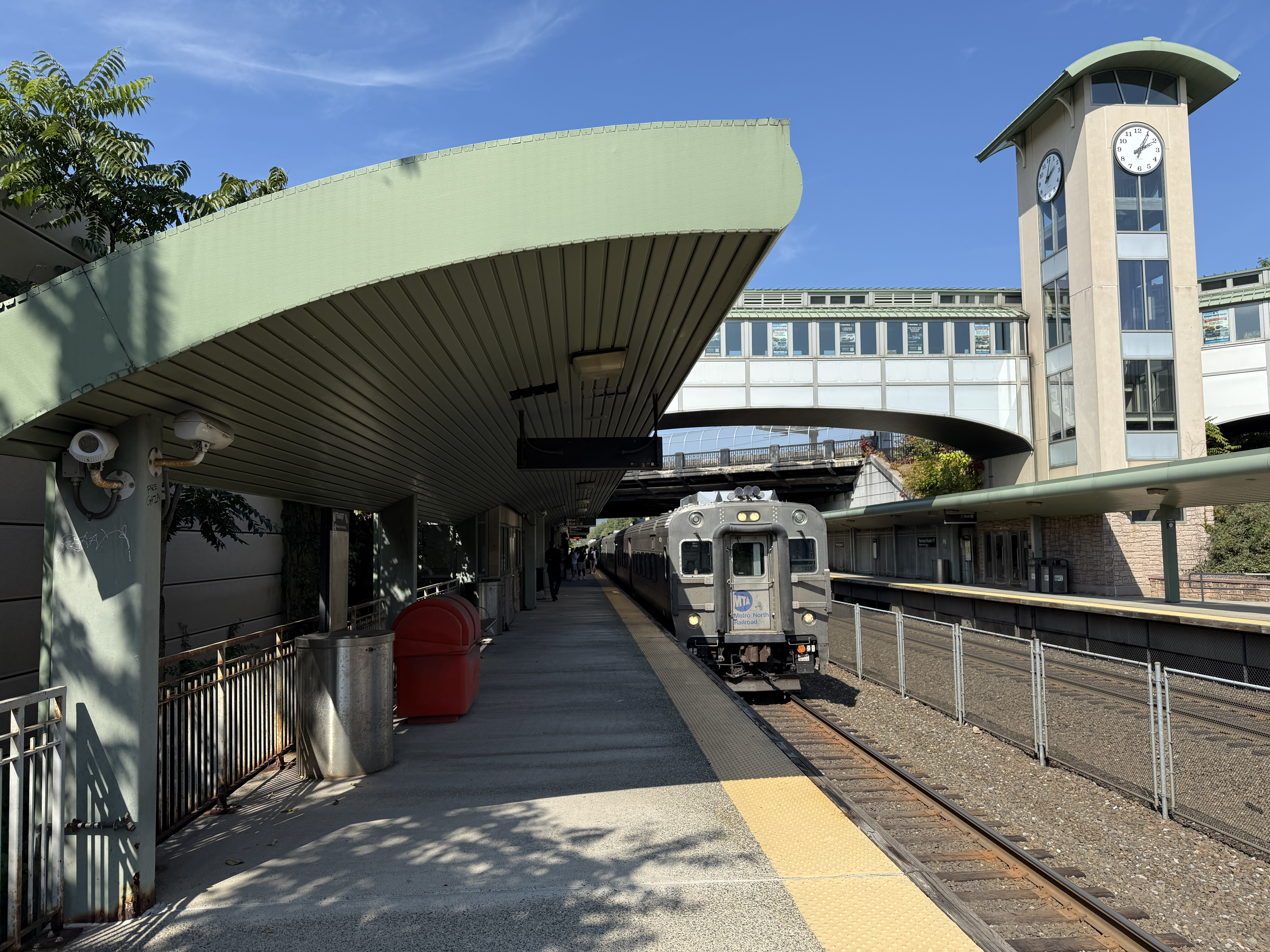
An inbound train to Hoboken stops at the station

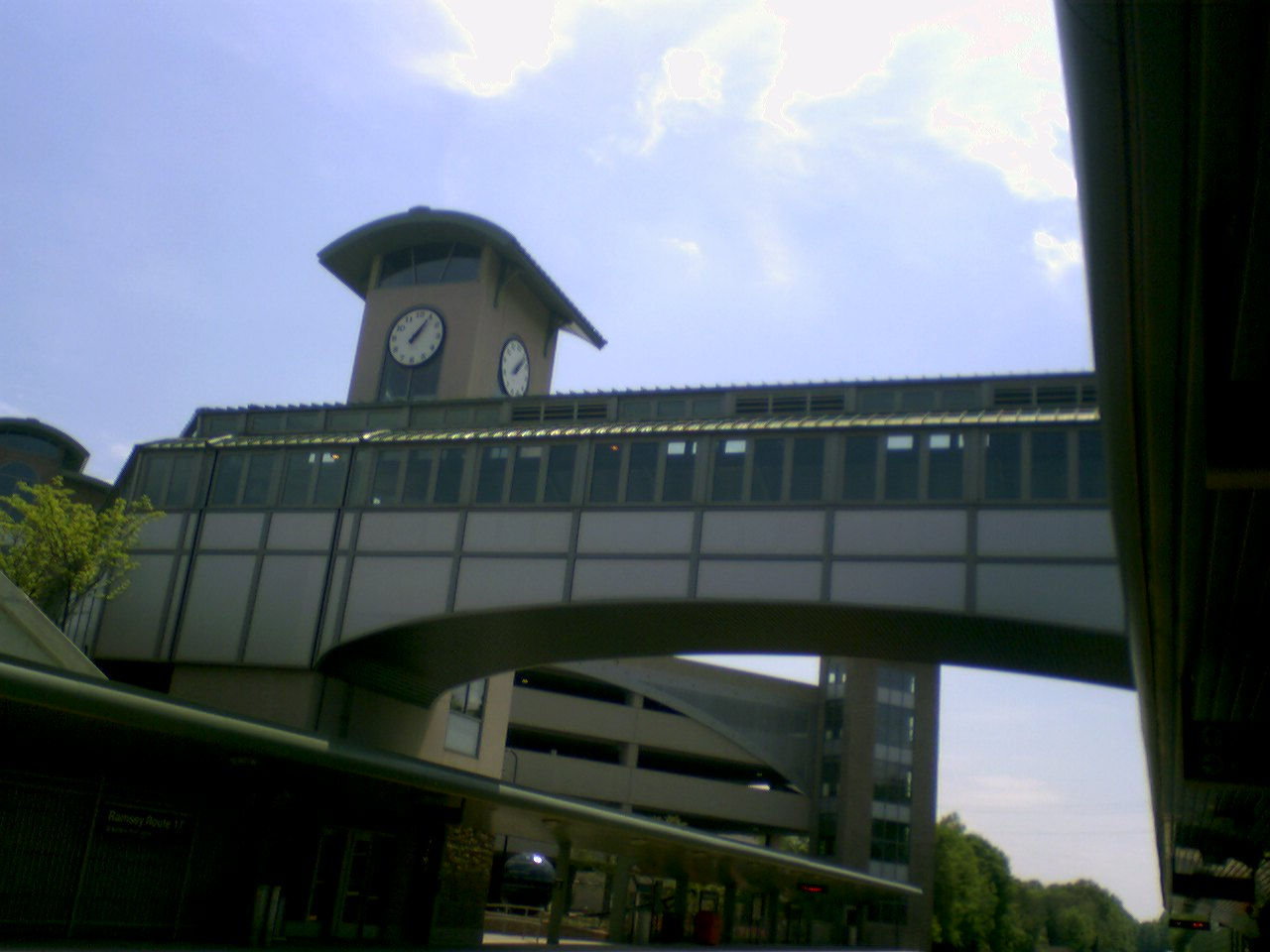
Pedestrian bridge at the Ramsey Route 17 station that is used to cross the railroad tracks

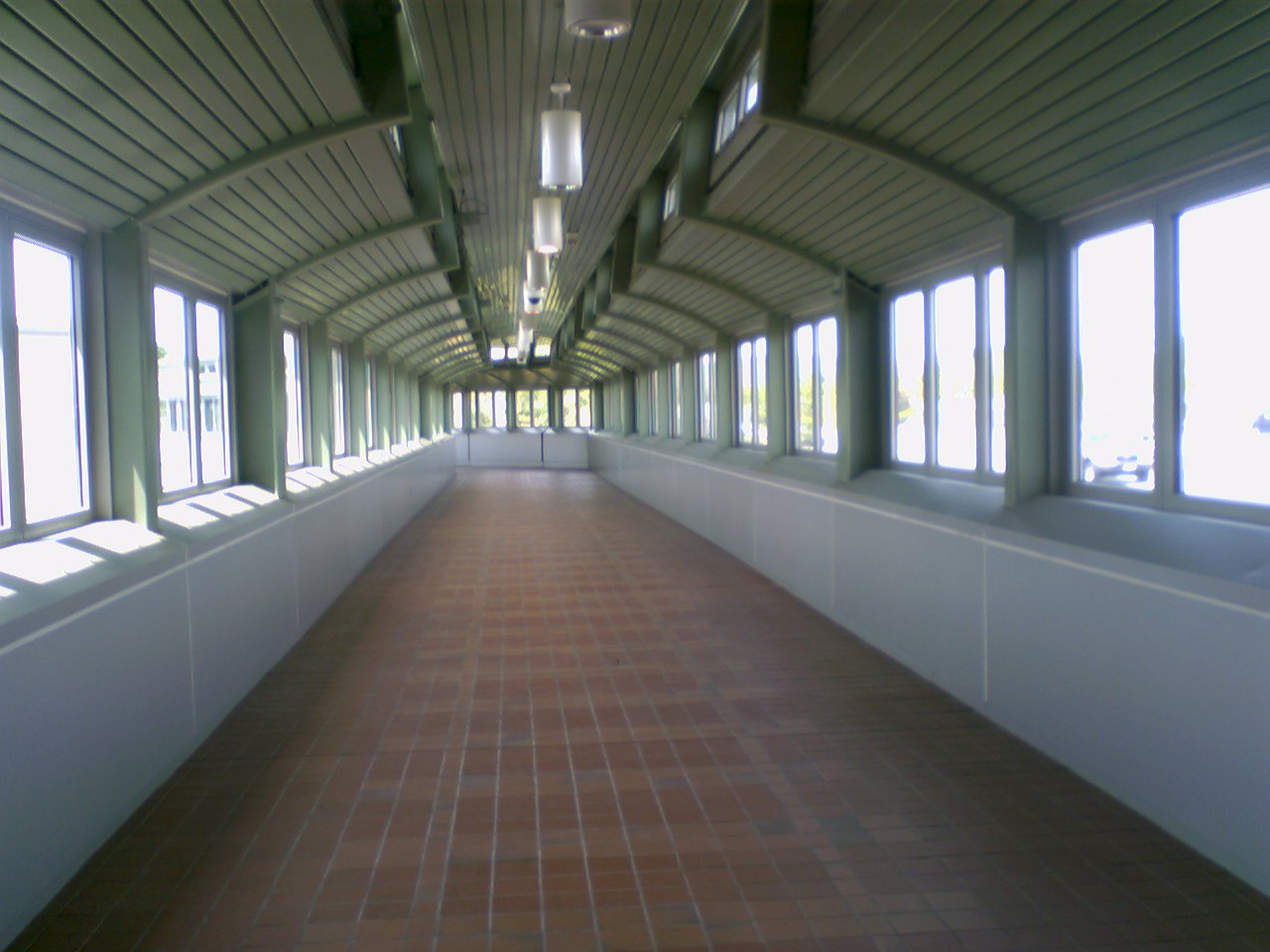
Interior of the pedestrian bridge

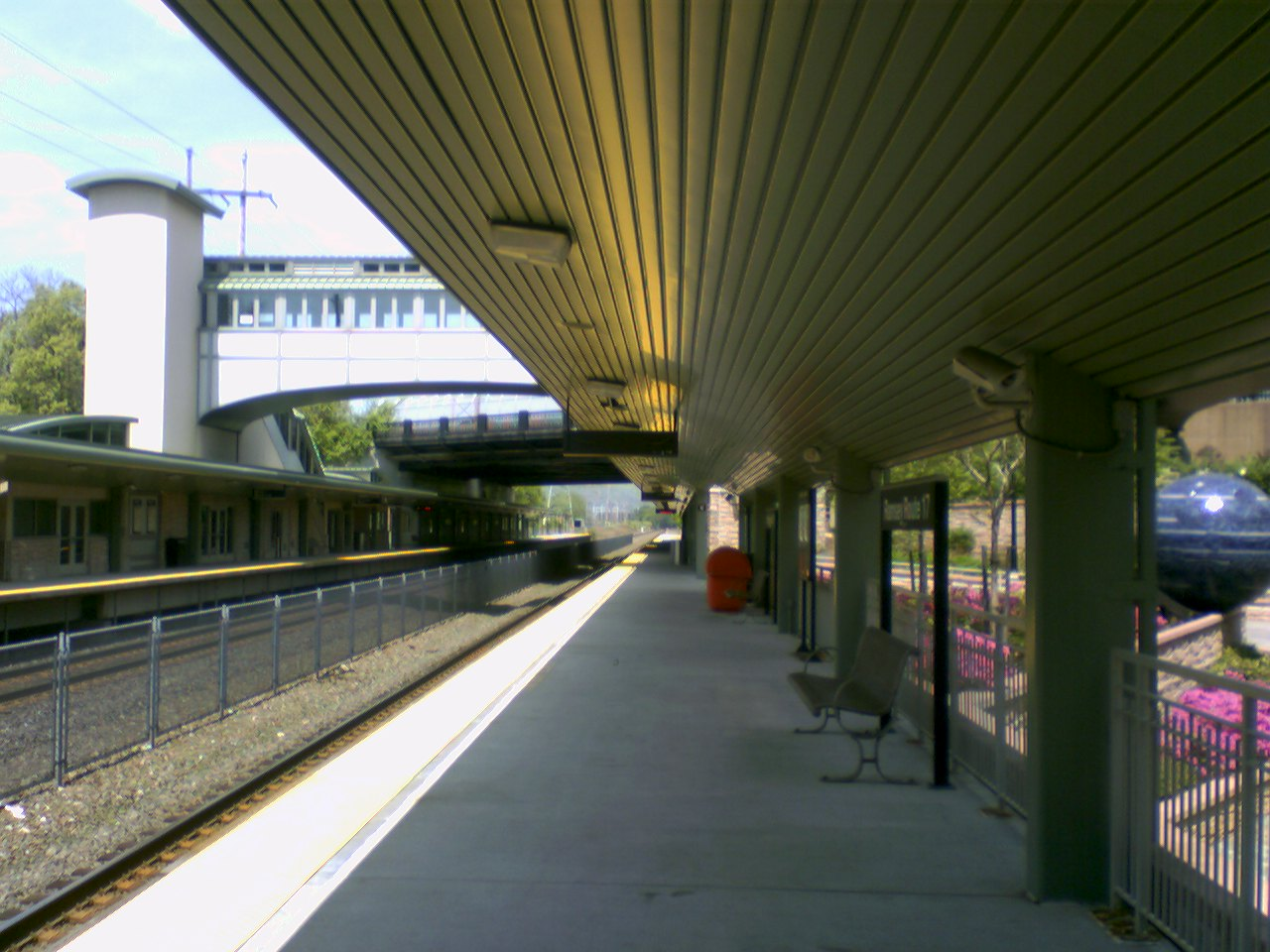
View from westbound platform
