= Allendale station (NJ Transit) =

NJ Transit rail station

Allendale
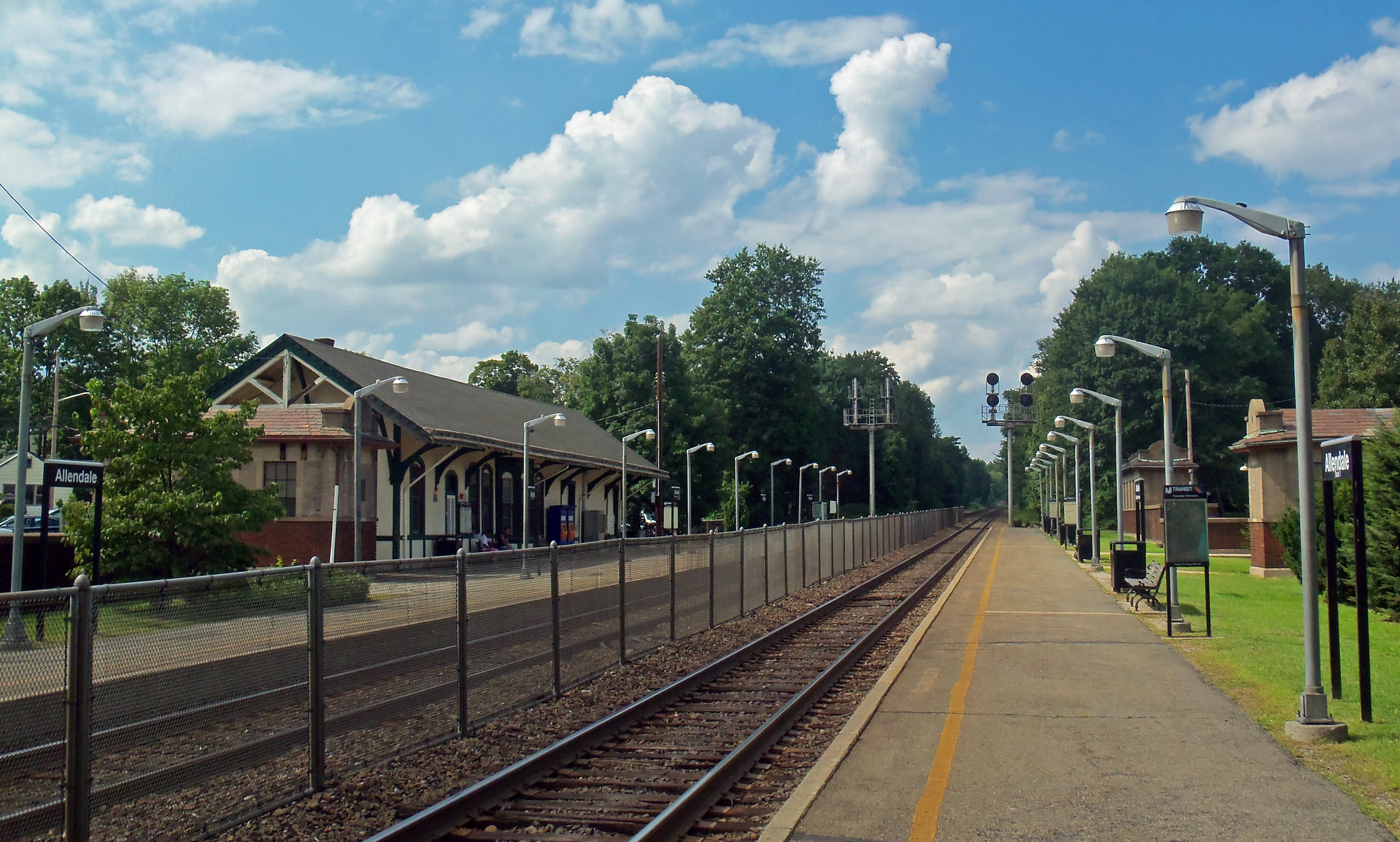
- View from westbound platform to original station building, 2011

General information
- Coordinates: 41.0309°N 74.1311°W
- Owner: NJ Transit
- Platforms: 2 side platforms
- Tracks: 2

Other information
- Station code: 2321 (Erie Railroad)
- Fare zone: 11

History
- Opened: October 19, 1848
- Closed: c. 1857
- Rebuilt: 1860; 1870

Passengers
- 2025: 273 (average weekday)
- Rank: 89 of 153

Services
Preceding station	NJ Transit	Following station
Ramsey toward Suffern	Main Line	Waldwick toward Hoboken
Ramsey toward Suffern	Bergen County Line weekdays	Waldwick toward Hoboken
Former services
Preceding station	Erie Railroad	Following station
Ramsey toward Chicago	Main Line	Waldwick toward Jersey City
Location

Allendale is a NJ Transit rail station served by its Main and Bergen County lines as well as Port Jervis Line trains (operated by NJ Transit for Metro-North Railroad). The station is located at the railroad next to Allendale, Park and Myrtle avenues in Downtown Allendale. The station consists of two low-level platforms serving trains heading between Hoboken Terminal and Suffern. Some westbound trains headed for Port Jervis also stop at Allendale. The station has two ticket vending machines along the inbound platform with three parking lots for commuters. The railroad depot, constructed in 1870, is a combined passenger and freight depot, with a waiting area for passengers at the south end of the building while the northern end is unused.

Service at Allendale began on October 19, 1848, when Joseph Mallinson donated some of his land in the area so the Paterson and Ramapo Railroad could build a depot. Service was ended in 1857 when the depot fell into disrepair, but returned in 1859, when Mallinson repaired the building. A new board and batten station replaced the Mallinson structure in 1870. The station was moved across the tracks to its current location in 1902 due to complaints about its condition. The passenger underpass constructed at Allendale was added in 1939 as part of the removal of several at-grade road crossings in the village.

== History ==
=== Construction ===
Train service in Allendale dates back to the 1840s, when the New Jersey State Legislature approved the creation of the Paterson and Ramapo Railroad. This new railroad would go from the city of Paterson in Passaic County to the New York state line in Franklin Township. In 1844, Joseph Warner Allen, the surveyor for the railroad, submitted a new route through the valley in the area of Hohokus. A year later the railroad approved Allen's plans for the new railroad. Construction began on the railroad in 1847, and the next year, service along the line began in October. Regular full-time service began the next month.

On October 19, 1848, a station stop was established on land donated by Joseph Mallinson, a carriage painter who owned much of the land in the area. Mallinson donated the land to encourage the railroad to establish a station at the location. This depot was named Allendale after the surveyor of the Paterson and Ramapo Railroad. While a community began to grow around it, the depot itself fell into disrepair by 1857 and the New York, Lake Erie and Western Railroad abandoned service. Two years later, the depot was described as being abandoned and left for ruin. Mallinson restored the building and service returned. He built a freight depot and by 1860, the railroad had built a new depot of gravel.

The first stationmaster at Allendale was Smith Roswell, a former resident of LaGrange, New York. He was the agent there for over five decades, later opening the first grocery store in the Allendale area and serving as postmaster. Roswell operated a general store in 1859 near the depot and opened a second one around 1878.

Allendale and nearby Ramsey were surrounded by strawberry farms. Rail service allowed the farmers to bring their crops to market personally, shipping millions of baskets to markets in Newark, Paterson and New York City.

=== Allendale as a commuter village ===
Later in the 19th century, the Allendale station began handling commuter rail to New York City. The land was considered quaint and serene; city residents began moving to northern Bergen County for the fresh air and a cheaper cost of living. Anticipating an increased demand for housing, local farmer John Garrison sold 34 acres (14 ha) of land to two local residents for approximately $6,000 (equivalent to $145,125 in 2025) in 1868. The tract was subdivided into lots for housing and a park the next year. However, a financial depression slowed the housing boom.

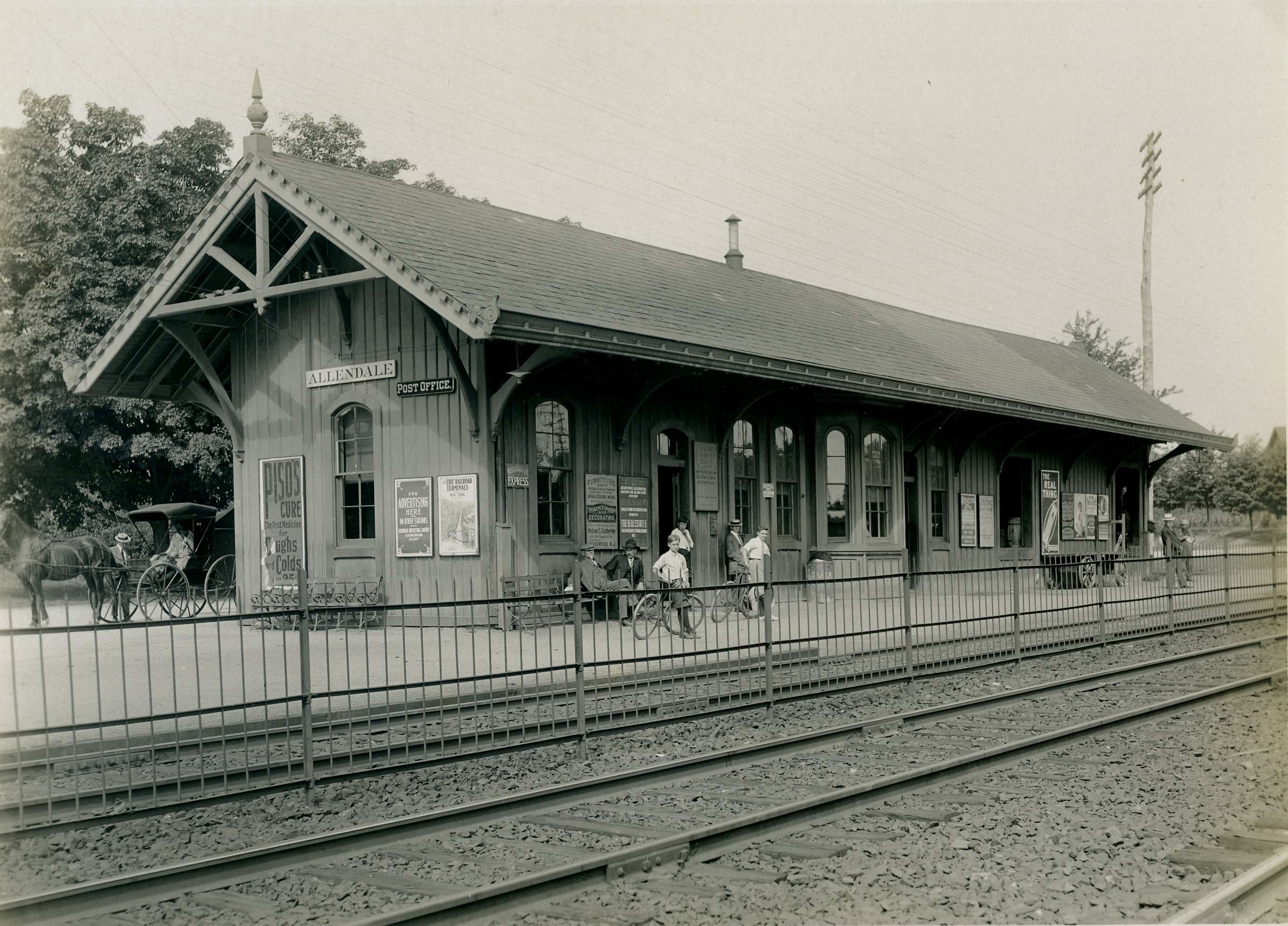
Allendale station, c. 1907–1912

At the same time, Herman Tallman of Monsey, New York proposed a new hotel next to the depot. In January 1870, the Bergen County Democrat announced the construction of a new hotel with a mansard roof along the main road in Allendale. While the location of this hotel is not clear, it is believed to be on the location where the Allendale depot stands. The hotel was demolished in 1887 after never being a successful venture.

Allendale quickly became a summer residence for many prominent entrepreneurs and officials of the Erie Railroad. Robert H. Berdell, the railroad's president from 1864 to 1867, lived in Allendale in the summer. Several of his relatives also vacationed there in the summer, as well as William Pitt Shearman, the Commissioner of Accounts of New York City, and Erie treasurer. Former Jersey City mayor Charles O'Neill also called Allendale his summer home. As a result of having so many railroad executives and politicians as nearby residents, Allendale station became an express stop, further encouraging people to move there.

A new board and batten depot was built on the east side of the tracks at Allendale in 1870 for $3,000, (equivalent to $76,382 in 2025), and completed in 1872. The railroad sold the former gravel depot back to Mallinson for use as an ice house. The next year a telegraph agency was added to the station. New lights would be installed in the area of Allendale station, as part of a beautification proposal that called for 500 in total throughout Allendale.

Businesses in Allendale continued to open around the train station during the late 19th century. James Linkroum, the marshal of Allendale, erected a building near the railroad depot on the east side of the tracks. This new building attracted businesses, including a local pharmacist who had left nearby Ramsey for Ohio. Linkoum himself opened a confectionery and a stationery store in his own building. A bakery was opened by William Kornhoff in 1903 until it burned six years later and relocated further up on Allendale Avenue. The station also became a hub for the first livery stables in Allendale, run by local entrepreneur Alonso Barrett. A barber shop also opened in 1917 in the area of the newly relocated depot.

=== 1902 relocation and upgrade ===
By 1902, the depot constructed in 1870 had become an eyesore. The residents of Allendale were pressuring the Erie Railroad to tear it down and replace it. The railroad responded to the complaints by moving the depot across the tracks in 1902 and partially refurbishing it at a total cost of $1,100 (equivalent to $40,933 in 2025). Its new location on the west side of the tracks was considered a better location; a new freight depot was built on the former site.

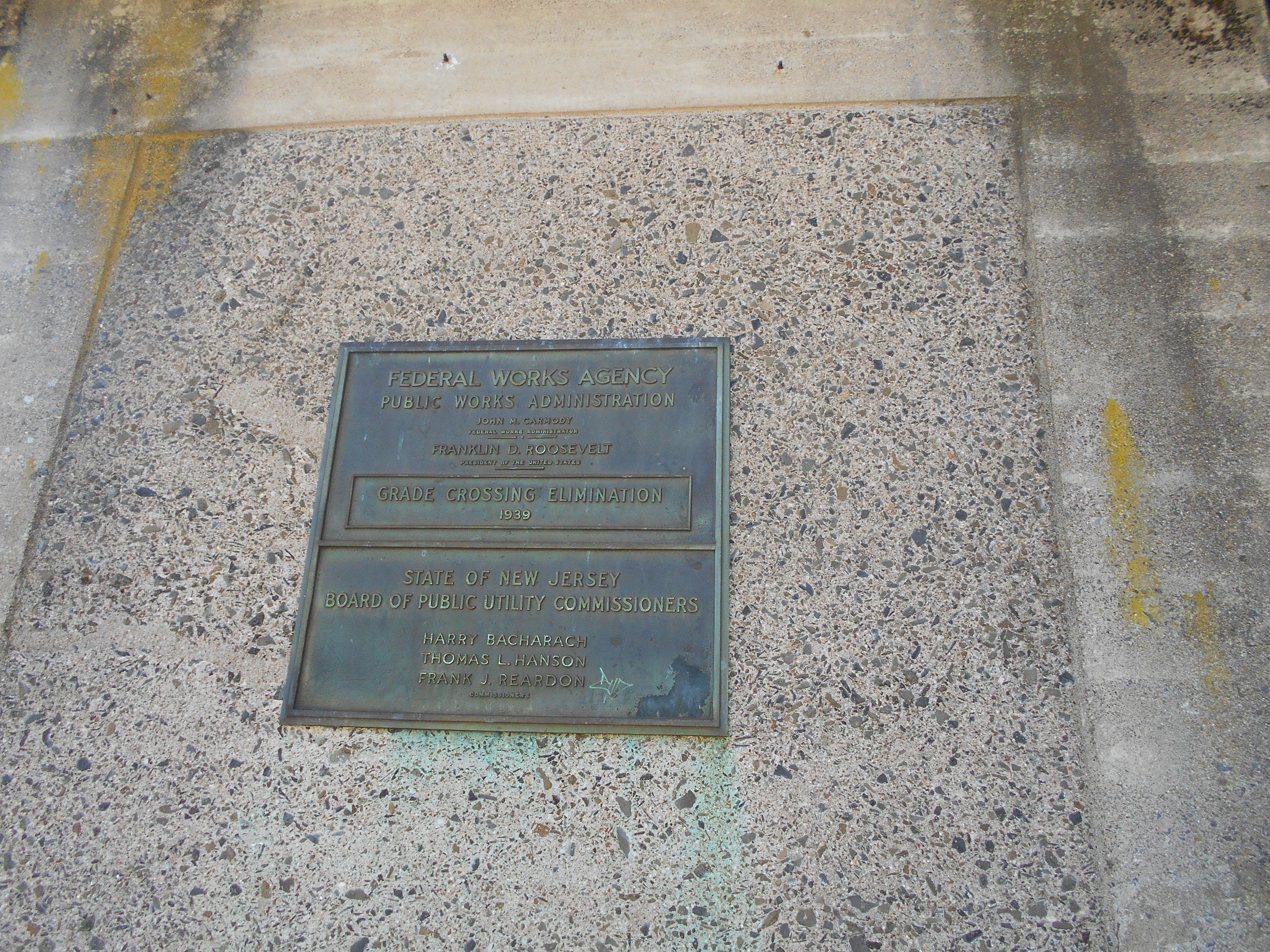
Plaque for the at-grade crossing removal on the pedestrian underpass

By July 1903, the Erie had completed the renovation. An entrance to the baggage room was added from inside. The depot's former separate waiting rooms were merged, and extra seats were installed for commuters. Electric lighting was also added. At this same time period, the railroad was widened through Allendale from two tracks to four, beginning in October 1903 between Ridgewood and Allendale.

In December 1903, a new Allendale Village Improvement Association was established. It worked on improving the plants and flowers along with the atmosphere around the station; disbanding in 1917. However, all the beautification did not stop burglars from regularly robbing the depot; they often took money from the vending machines. In 1913, the post office moved from the station to a store in town. In 1916, the Allendale Christmas Tree Association was established and began regularly putting a Christmas tree in the Allendale station square. Toilets were installed in March 1917.

=== Great Depression ===
The Wall Street Crash of 1929 and the Great Depression adversely affected Allendale. Residents were unable to pay for their homes, and some stood abandoned along Allendale Avenue. In 1931, the Erie Railroad moved its headquarters from Jersey City to Cleveland, Ohio; many of its workers moved with it. The village, however, worked through its Garden Club to keep the plants and atmosphere around the depot in good shape. The depot saw some upgrades in 1932 as well, repairing and adding on to some of the depot; more work was done in 1939.

In 1938, during the elimination of some grade crossings in Allendale, the telephone poles around the station and tracks were moved. At the beginning of the next year, a joint project of the Erie, the Works Progress Administration and the New Jersey Public Utilities Commissioners built new overpasses to replace the grade crossings and a pedestrian underpass at the Allendale station to replace the closed grade crossings at West Allendale and Park avenues.

=== Since 1949 ===
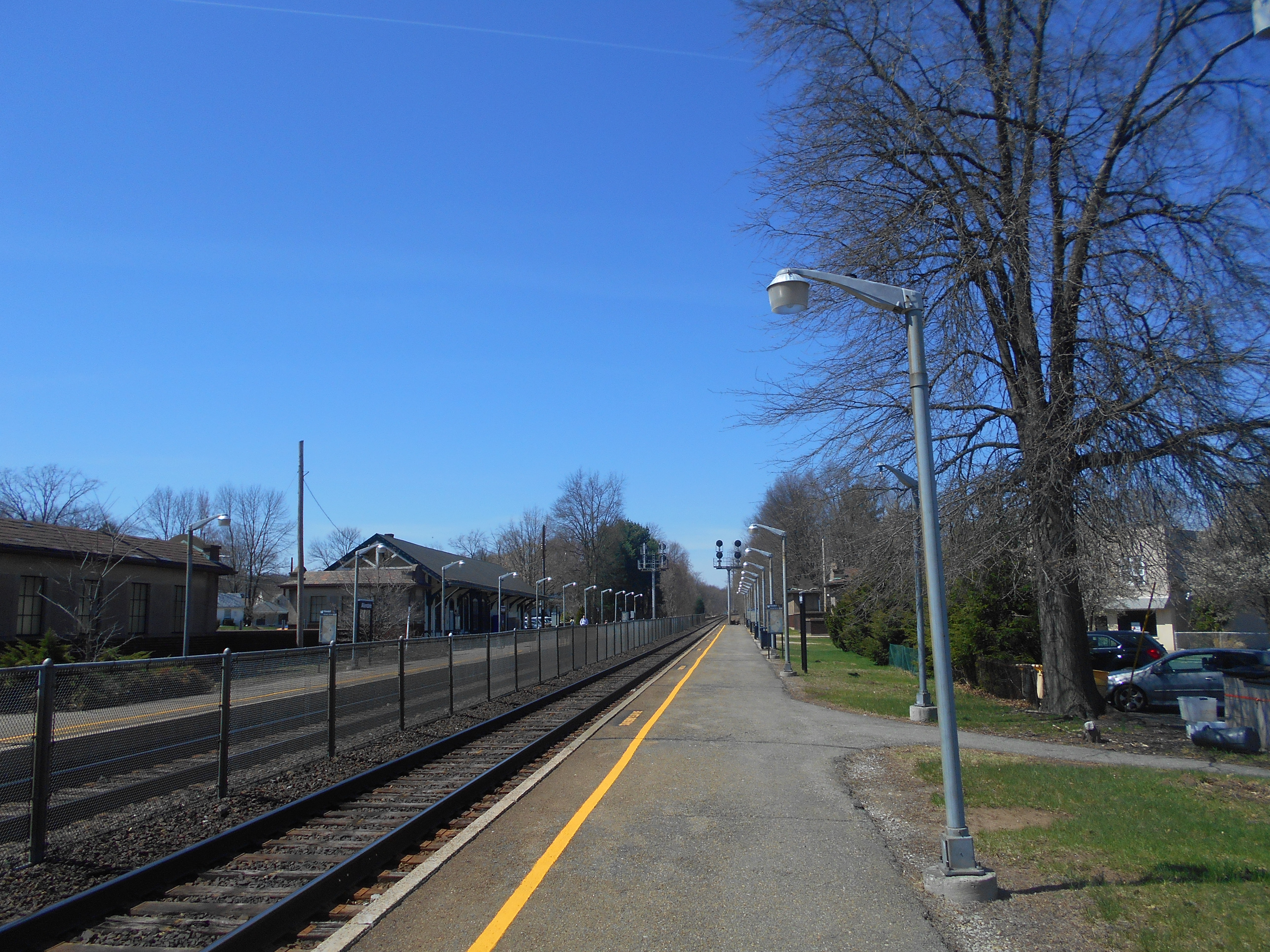
The outbound platform at Allendale station in 2014. The station depot is located on the left

In 1949, the borough purchased the land around the depot from the railroad; the purchase closed a year later and parking lots were built. The Allendale Garden Club re-landscaped the grounds in conjunction with the borough. In 1960 the Erie merged with the Delaware, Lackawanna and Western Railroad to create the Erie-Lackawanna Railroad; the merged company was unable to compete and, like many other Northeastern railroads, was combined into the federally owned Conrail in the mid-1970s.

In 1982, the station came under the control of New Jersey Transit (NJT), the public agency which had taken over commuter rail in the state from Conrail. That year, the depot was renovated heavily along with other stations in the state; the goal was to encourage the borough to take over operating and maintaining the station building. NJT installed new structural support beams on the west side of the depot, creating a new foundation for the depot, replacing walls, floors and gutters. The exterior was stuccoed. However, the unused service windows and general unkemptness persisted afterward. Five years later, NJT installed new low-level platforms at the depot, replacing the sidewalks and curbs and reseeding the lawns.

== Layout ==
This station has two tracks, each with a low-level side platform.

Allendale station provides three permit parking lots; the first, located around the depot, has 77 spaces that are permit-based during the day. There are also two lots on the east side of the tracks of Allendale Avenue. The second lot has 43 permit-based parking spaces, with free evening parking and weekend parking. The third lot has 138 spaces for both daily and permit parking. Permits are managed by the borough of Allendale. There are also two ticket vending machines, both located on the side of the depot facing the inbound platform.

== Bibliography ==
- Grant, H. Roger (October 1996). Erie Lackawanna: The Death of an American Railroad, 1938-1992. Palo Alto, California: Stanford University Press. ISBN 9780804727983.
- Van Valen, James M. (1900). History of Bergen County, New Jersey. New York, New York: New Jersey Publishing and Engraving Company.
- Wardell, Patricia Webb (1994). Allendale: Background of a Borough. Allendale, New Jersey: Allendale Historical Society. Archived from the original on August 16, 2017.
