= Mahwah station =

NJ Transit and Metro-North Railroad station

Mahwah
- The 1913 station building at Mahwah is visible on the left in July 2026

General information
- Location: North Railroad Avenue & East Ramapo Avenue; Mahwah, New Jersey
- Coordinates: 41°05′39″N 74°08′48″W
- Owner: New Jersey Transit
- Line: NJT Main Line
- Platforms: 2 side platforms
- Tracks: 2
- Connections: Short Line Bus: 17

Construction
- Parking: 86 spaces, 1 accessible space
- Accessible: No

Other information
- Station code: 2325 (Erie Railroad)
- Fare zone: 14

History
- Opened: October 19, 1848
- Former names: Wanamaker's

Passengers
- 2025: 119 (average weekday)
- Rank: 115 of 153

Services
Preceding station	NJ Transit	Following station
Suffern Terminus	Main Line	Ramsey Route 17 toward Hoboken
Suffern Terminus	Bergen County Line weekdays	Ramsey Route 17 toward Hoboken
Preceding station	Metro-North Railroad	Following station
Suffern toward Port Jervis	Port Jervis Line limited service	Ramsey Route 17 toward Hoboken
Former services
Preceding station	Erie Railroad	Following station
Suffern toward Chicago	Main Line	Ramsey toward Jersey City
Location

Mahwah station is a NJ Transit train station located in Mahwah, New Jersey served by the Main Line, Bergen County Line and a limited service served by Metro-North Railroad's Port Jervis Line.

== History ==
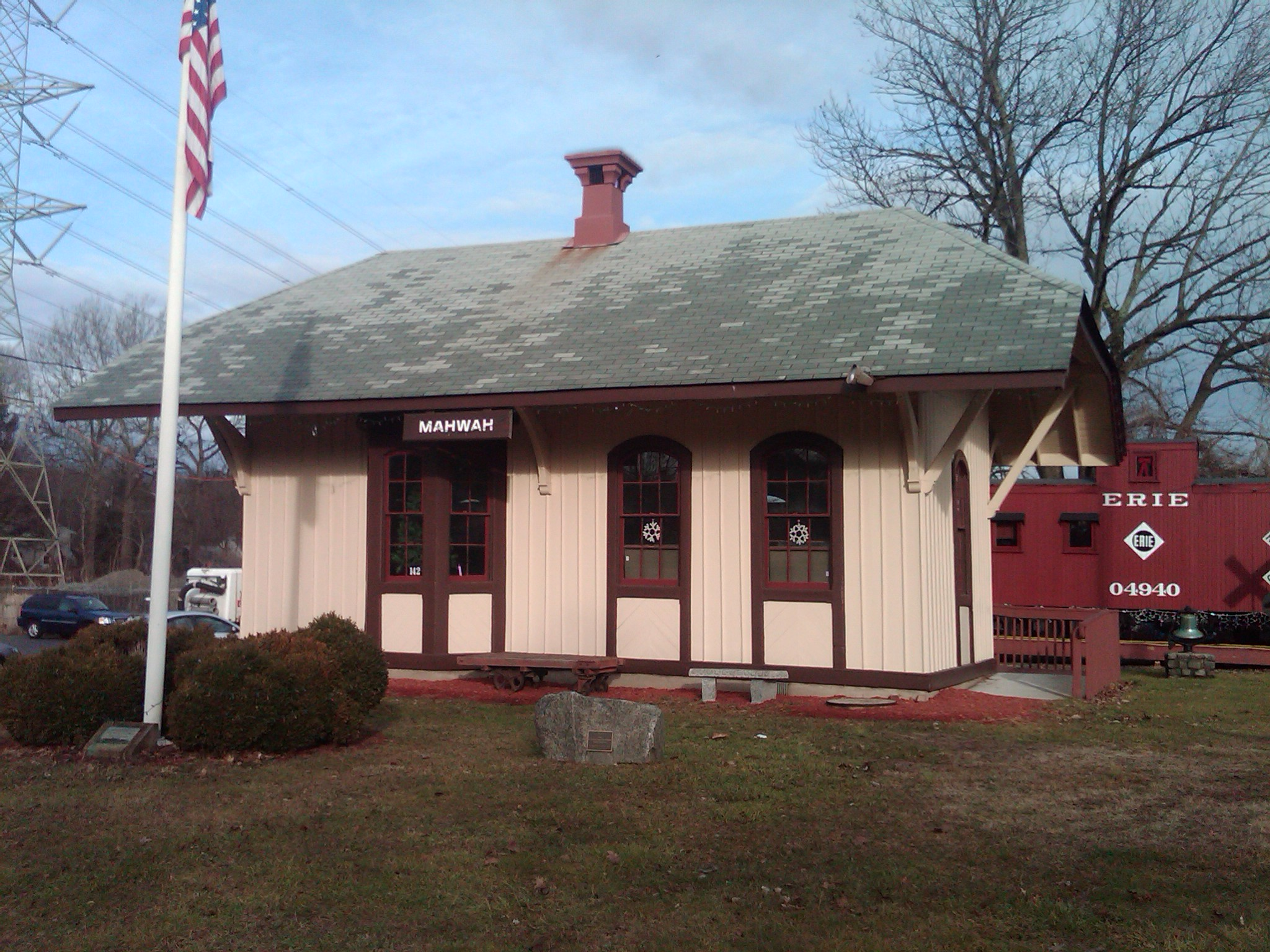
The 1871 depot, now a museum

The beginning of railroad service in Mahwah dates to the 1840s with the Paterson and Ramapo Railroad, which had its charter approved on March 10, 1841, by the state of New Jersey. The railroad was extended through Mahwah in 1848, and while Mahwah was designated as a station, it was only a flag stop: passengers desiring to ride would need to notify the station agent, who would then flag down a passing train to stop. Even after the Erie Railroad leased the Paterson and Ramapo in 1852, there was no initial change to service at Mahwah, and it was not until citizens of Mahwah persuaded the railroad that there was enough passenger and freight traffic for a depot that one was constructed in 1871. The land for the new depot was donated by Albert Winter, a local citizen.

The new station depot made it easier for those who would have to travel to Suffern, Oakland or Ramsey to ship their products along the Erie Railroad. In 1872, the land on a hillside nearby was bought by Ezra Miller, a local inventor, who created Oweno, a farm estate which is now part of Cragmere Park. The mansion at Oweno burned down in 1899, which elicited calls for a fire department in Mahwah, which did not exist at the time. That same year, Alfred B. Darling, who owned the Fifth Avenue Hotel in New York City established a stock farm in the area, which would lead to the creation of the hamlet of Darlington. The station also served as a place for people to escape the heat in urban areas during the summer season.

In 1904, the Erie Railroad re-developed the area of and around the depot. The crossing of East Ramapo Avenue next to the depot was changed from at-grade to a new railroad bridge to the south, and the original two track alignment was widened to four tracks. Freight trains would use the inside tracks. A new depot was also constructed in 1904, with the original 1871 depot being moved to fresh land called Depot Park, saving it from demolition. In designing Depot Square Park involved the extension of East Ramapo Avenue to Franklin Turnpike and a new connection with Miller Road. The square within the four roads became the park.

In 1908, electrical crossing gates were installed in Mahwah, as Rockland Electric came in and powered up the municipality. The new electrical gates would be managed by a man who was working in the gatehouse that used to serve as the watchman's shanty. The 1904 depot only lasted over a decade, as in 1914, the station burned due to a fire that was left untouched. Mahwah still did not have a fire company in the 16 years following the burning of Oweno, Local residents had been talking about organizing one and getting a fire engine, but that ended up not occurring. A new depot was constructed by the Erie Railroad in 1915, an irregular shape design with a wood and stucco design. The roof was created out of asbestos shingles.

In 1967, the Mahwah Historical Society acquired the 1871 depot and began to restore the structure. In order to do this, the station was moved 200 feet (61 m) from its site to a spot across from Winter's Pond. The depot required repairing the roof, installing new glass, repairing doors and chimney. Special molding was inserted around the depot, and the flooring required replacement. The depot was completed on September 22, 1968. In 1970, the society acquired a caboose once used by the Erie that was constructed in 1910. The Erie donated ties and rails in return for payment of the track crews and the caboose was moved by crane into its new spot.

The 1915 station house underwent renovations in 2016.

In March 2023, NJ Transit announced plans to revitalize the station with roof repairs, retaining wall and electrical work.

== Station layout and services ==
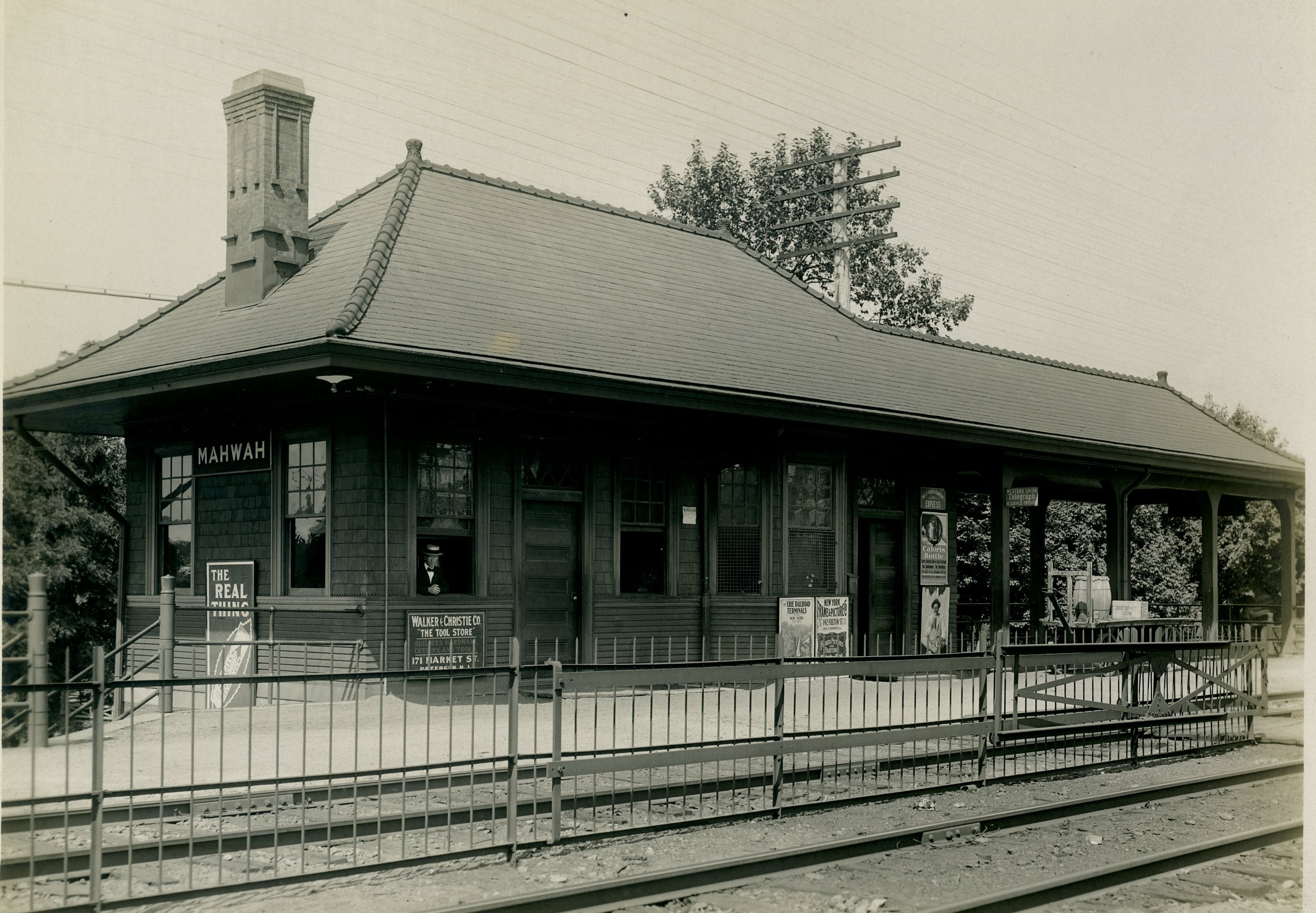
The 1904-built station depot in Mahwah

The station has two tracks, each with a low-level side platform. The station has ticket vending machines. Only one bus connection is available, the Short Line Bus 17. Parking is also provided at Mahwah with two lots. The first lot is located on North Railroad Avenue, owned by the township. These 34 spaces are paid for by permit only and no parking is allowed in the overnight hours. The second lot is located at Ramapo Avenue and South Railroad Avenue, with 75 spaces, one of which is handicap accessible. The lot is also permit only and closed at overnight hours.

== Bibliography ==
- Greene, Carol Wehran (February 2014). Images of America: Mahwah. Mount Pleasant, South Carolina: Arcadia Publishing. ISBN 9781467120319.
- Yanosey, Robert (2006). Erie Railroad Facilities (In Color). Vol. 1: New Jersey. Scotch Plains, New Jersey: Morning Sun Books Inc. ISBN 1582481830.
