= Suffern station =

NJ Transit and Metro-North Railroad station

Suffern
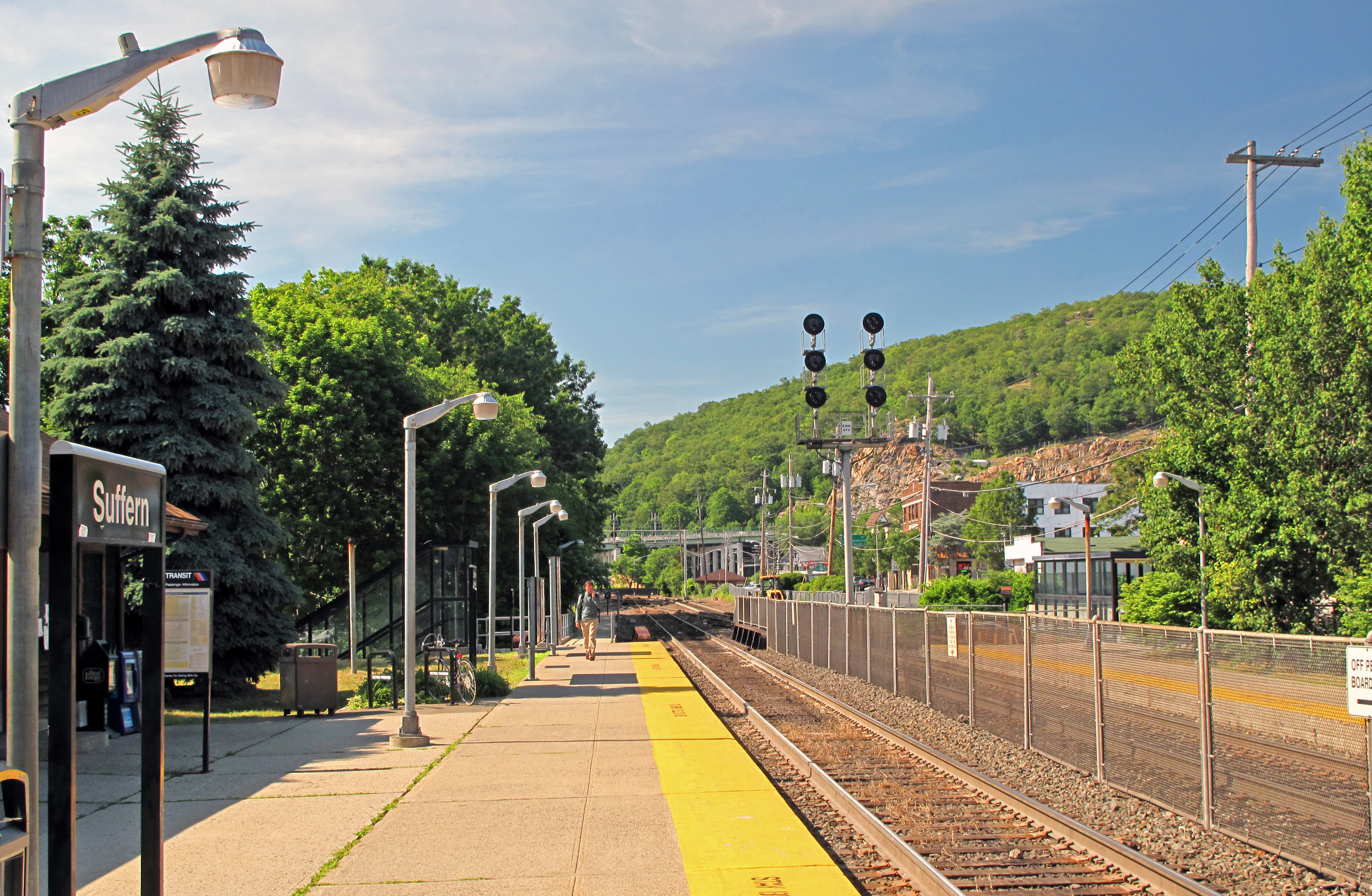
- The station at Suffern, looking north along the tracks toward Nordkop Mountain.

General information
- Location: 2 Ramapo Avenue; Suffern, New York
- Coordinates: 41°06′50″N 74°09′14″W
- Owner: New Jersey Transit
- Platforms: 2 side platforms
- Tracks: 2
- Connections: Transport of Rockland: 59, 93, Monsey Loop 3, Tappan ZEExpress; Short Line Bus: 17M/MD/SF

Construction
- Parking: 366 spaces
- Accessible: No

Other information
- Station code: 2501 (Erie Railroad)
- Fare zone: 14

History
- Opened: June 30, 1841
- Rebuilt: 1887 1941

Passengers
- 2025: 448 (average weekday)
- Rank: 63 of 153

Services
Preceding station	NJ Transit	Following station
Terminus	Main Line	Mahwah toward Hoboken
Terminus	Bergen County Line weekdays	Mahwah toward Hoboken
Preceding station	Metro-North Railroad	Following station
Sloatsburg toward Port Jervis	Port Jervis Line	Ramsey Route 17 toward Hoboken
Sloatsburg toward Port Jervis	Port Jervis Line	Mahwah (limited service) toward Hoboken
Former services
Preceding station	Erie Railroad	Following station
Hillburn toward Chicago	Main Line	Mahwah toward Jersey City
Terminus	Piermont Branch	Tallmans toward Sparkill
Terminus	Piermont Branch	Dater's Crossing Flag stop toward Sparkill
Location

Suffern station is a railroad station in the village of Suffern. The station, located on Ramapo Avenue in Suffern, services trains of New Jersey Transit's Main Line and Metro-North Railroad's Port Jervis Line. Suffern station serves as the terminal for Main Line trains, as trains continue north into Hillburn Yard. It is the only Main Line station in New York, and the next Main Line station, located in New Jersey, is Mahwah. The next Port Jervis Line station to the north is Sloatsburg. The station consists of two low-level side platforms for trains in both directions, neither of which are handicap accessible for the Americans with Disabilities Act of 1990.

Railroad service in Suffern began with the construction of the New York and Erie Railroad in 1841 on land owned by the family of local settler John Suffern of Antrim, Ireland. As part of the generosity, the station at New Antrim was named Suffern in their honor. Regular passenger service in the area began on September 23, 1841 between Goshen and Piermont. Railroad service through Suffern changed on October 19, 1848 when the Paterson and Ramapo Railroad opened for passenger service, resulting in the standing Suffern station becoming part of a branch of the railroad instead of the main line. A new station was built in 1862 to help serve the two lines better. This was replaced on March 9, 1887 between the junction of the Erie Railroad main line and the Piermont Branch. The railroad replaced this station on New Year's Day of 1941 with the current structure.

== History ==
=== Construction and opening (1835–1841) ===
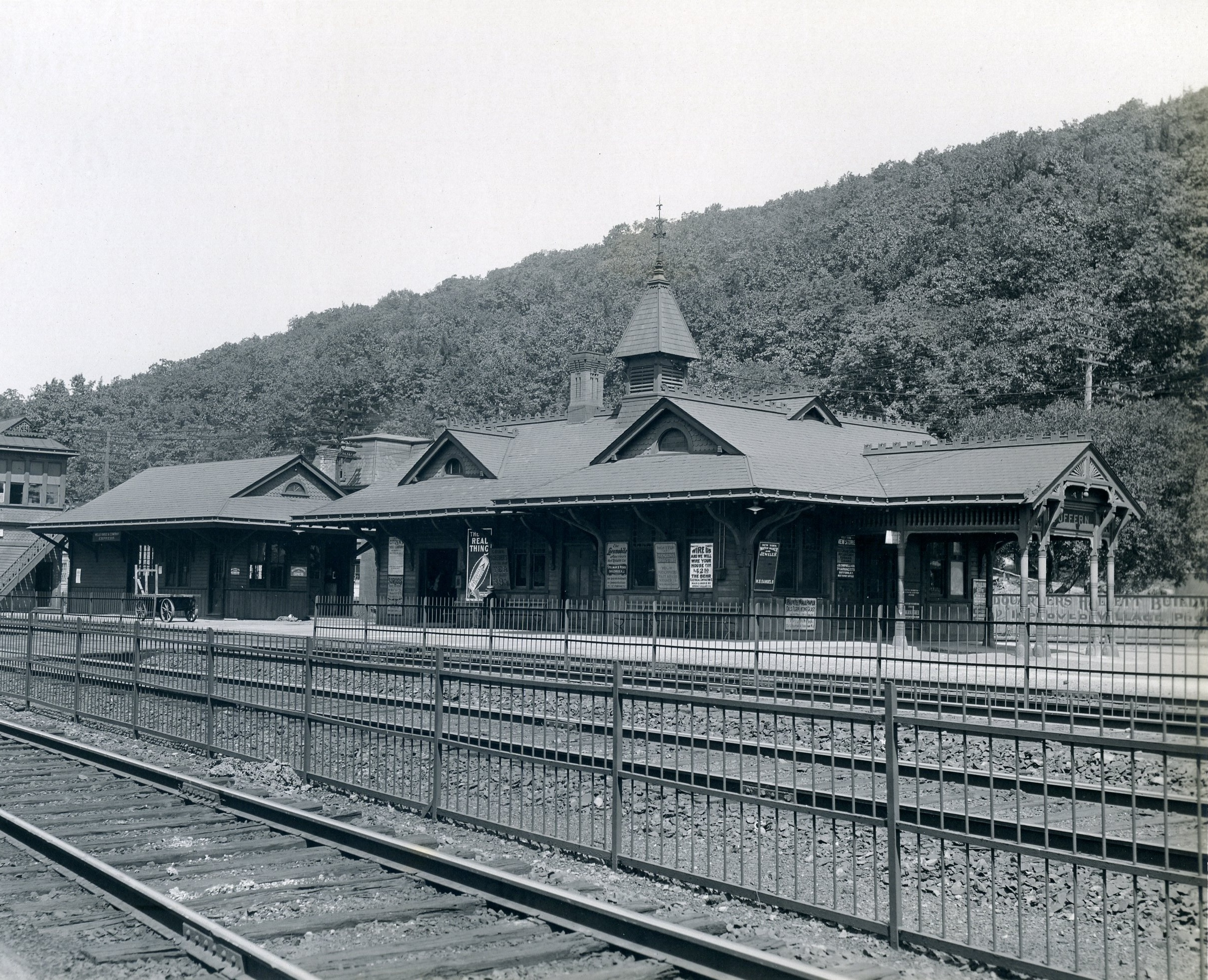
The 1887-built Suffern station, c. 1907–1912, with SF Tower nearby

The construction of a railroad through the town of Ramapo and village of Suffern date to the incorporation of the New York and Lake Erie Railroad, a proposed line from Piermont in Rockland County to Dunkirk in Chautauqua County in November 1831. After several years of delays in funding, including gaining the interest and financial influence of Eleazar Lord in 1832, survey work for the new line began in 1834, with a report in January 1835 finalizing the line. Despite New York City being the better terminal for a railroad, Lord demanded that the railroad end in Piermont, 24 miles (39 km) to the northwest. The New York and Harlem Railroad also offered to build a branch to meet a rail ferry from Piermont to connect the two railroads for a direct New York City connection at the cost of $90,000 (1834 USD) and Lord declined.

Construction of the railroad began with a groundbreaking ceremony on November 7, 1835 at Deposit in Delaware County. Lord was not present at the ceremony due to disagreements with John Gore King, the President, about a route through Orange County via Newburgh instead of Piermont.

However, a panic came on December 16, 1835 when the Great Fire of New York broke out, resulting in the elimination of funding for the railroad. Many people who paid subscriptions for the new railroad lost their wealth and numerous banks collapsed. As a result, the people in charge offered two engineers, Andrew Talcott and Edwin Johnson, to re-survey the railroad because of their confidence the New York State Legislature would help back the railroad. This optimism was short-lived as the finances were continuing to struggle and politicians in Albany were growing opposed to the railroad. The counties along the proposed railroad, save for Rockland and Orange, sent letters to their politicians to support the railroad. Governor of New York William Marcy also attempted to help the cause by saying that any decision should be done with the matter of public good and encouraged his colleagues to reconsider their views. As a result, both houses of the Legislature and the Governor signed a bill helping fund the railroad.

However, the funding of $600,000 (1836 USD) would only come if the railroad spent $1.3 million in return. Already reeling financially, King tried to help raise new funds for the railroad and could not get outside financing from banks in the United Kingdom. As a result, Lord returned to the project in 1836. Lord proposed that the state match the railroad with a loan of $100,000. As a result, the requirement would be that the railroad be built 10 miles (16 km) in each direction from Dunkirk and Piermont. The officials, who preferred Lord's investment over King, who did not and attempted to censure a liaison for Lord, removed King from his post and made Lord President.

Back in control, Lord immediately let contracts for the construction of the two 10-mile (16 km) railroad segments. He also asked that the railroad start letting out contracts to extend the railroad to Goshen in Orange County and soon after, Middletown, 45 miles (72 km) from Piermont.

Construction of the railroad resumed in 1838, reinvigorating interest in a forlorn project. By Fall 1838, the construction of a railroad dock in Piermont began and track had been built to Sparkill had been installed. By the Summer of 1839, the contracts for construction to Goshen and Middletown were approved. As Lord and subscribers continued to help fund the railroad, more positivity resulted in further construction. By the end of 1840, the entire line had been funded save for the section between Deposit and Binghamton, where serious challenges awaited.

However, New York City was upset that the railroad being built for its benefit, continued to have no influence in the direct benefits. Locals made things tough for Lord, accusing him and his colleagues of defrauding investors and having corrupt agreements with Rockland and Orange County investors. Lord, knowing the issues with such accusations, sent an official protest to Albany in December 1840, resulting in an investigation, where the New York State Assembly's Committee on Railroads noted that no corruption or illegal acts had occurred. Lord, feeling he had succeeded in his mission, resigned as President on May 28, 1841. Before his resignation became official, Lord asked the Board of Trustees to reimburse the original stockholders for their massive financial losses in the 1835 fire.

With construction mostly complete to Goshen, a celebratory first ride was held on June 30, 1841. James Bowen, who replaced Lord as President, Henry Pierson, the Vice President, other executives and Board of Trustees members, came from the Reade Street pier on the Hudson River on a ferryboat to Piermont, where the train ride would begin. The original locomotive for the railroad, Rockland, took them and some reporters through the area at 10 miles per hour (16 km/h). Despite the grand ceremony and gala, the railroad announced that regular passenger and freight service would begin on September 23, 1841. The village of New Antrim, 32 miles (51 km) from New York City, received a station on the new railroad, and as part of it, the municipality and station gained the name of Suffern, named after the first settler in the area, John Suffern of Antrim, Ireland. The new name was made as a gift to the family as Elizabeth Suffern had been a financier of the railroad and Judge Edward Suffern, her son, helped provide the right-of-way for the railroad on family property. The railroad built the station in Suffern on Orange Avenue near Wayne Avenue. This station was a single side platform station at the base of the nearby Nordkop Mountain, with a wooden depot.

=== Paterson and Ramapo Railroad and new stations ===
The New York and Erie Railroad slowly opened extensions as time passed. Service came to Middletown on July 1, 1843; to Otisville on November 1, 1846; to Port Jervis on December 1, 1847; Binghamton at the end of 1848; and Dunkirk on May 14, 1851.

== Station layout ==
The station has two tracks, each with a low-level side platform. Suffern is the only station used by New Jersey Transit in New York (aside from New York Penn Station) that does not have Metro North-styled signage trackside, instead employing NJT's black and white signs.

== Bibliography ==
- Hungerford, Edward (1946). Men of Erie: A Story of Human Effort. New York, New York: Random House.
- Long, Craig H. (February 28, 2011). Images of America: Suffern. Mount Pleasant, South Carolina: Arcadia Publishing. ISBN 9780738573519.
- Mott, Edward Harold (1899). Between the Ocean and the Lakes: The Story of Erie. New York, New York: John S. Collins.
