= Westervelt–Ackerson House =

Historic house in New Jersey, United States

- U.S. National Register of Historic Places
- New Jersey Register of Historic Places
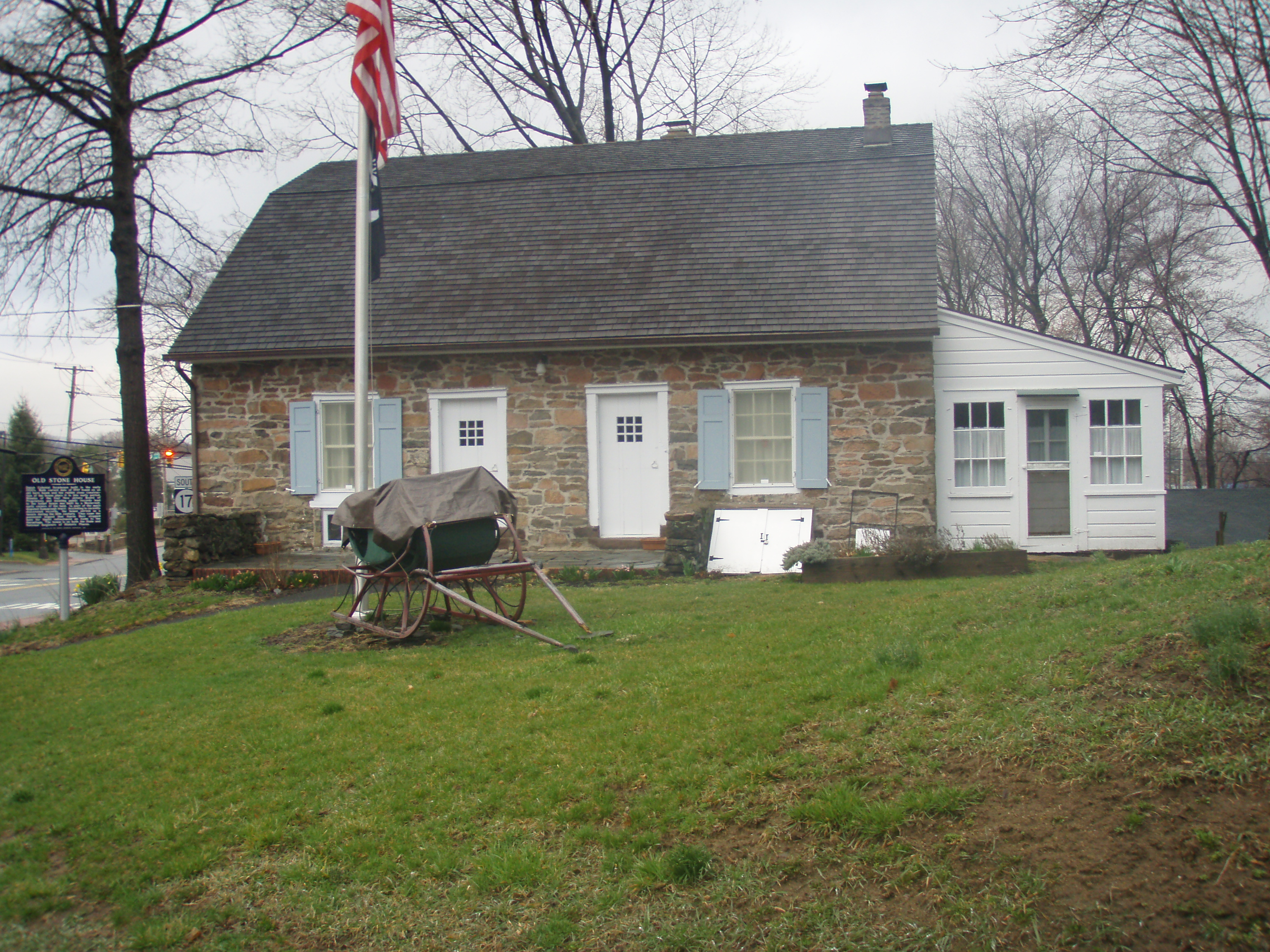

- Location within Bergen County, New Jersey
- Location: 538 Island Road, Ramsey, New Jersey
- Coordinates: 41°4′25″N 74°8′39″W
- Area: 118 acres (48 ha)
- NRHP reference No.: 77000846
- NJRHP No.: 636

Significant dates
- Added to NRHP: July 20, 1977
- Designated NJRHP: June 18, 1976

The Westervelt–Ackerson House is located in Ramsey, in Bergen County, New Jersey, United States. The house was added to the National Register of Historic Places on July 20, 1977.

== Early history ==
The Westervelt–Ackerson house, also known as The Old Stone House, is currently believed to have been constructed in the early to mid-1700s. Corroborating evidence has been found on the grounds themselves, an old barn beam bears the date 1747 and the stone construction of the structure also supports this. The house was built as a Dutch Colonial farmhouse, its materials were Rubble, stone, clay mortar, chopped straw and hogs hair.

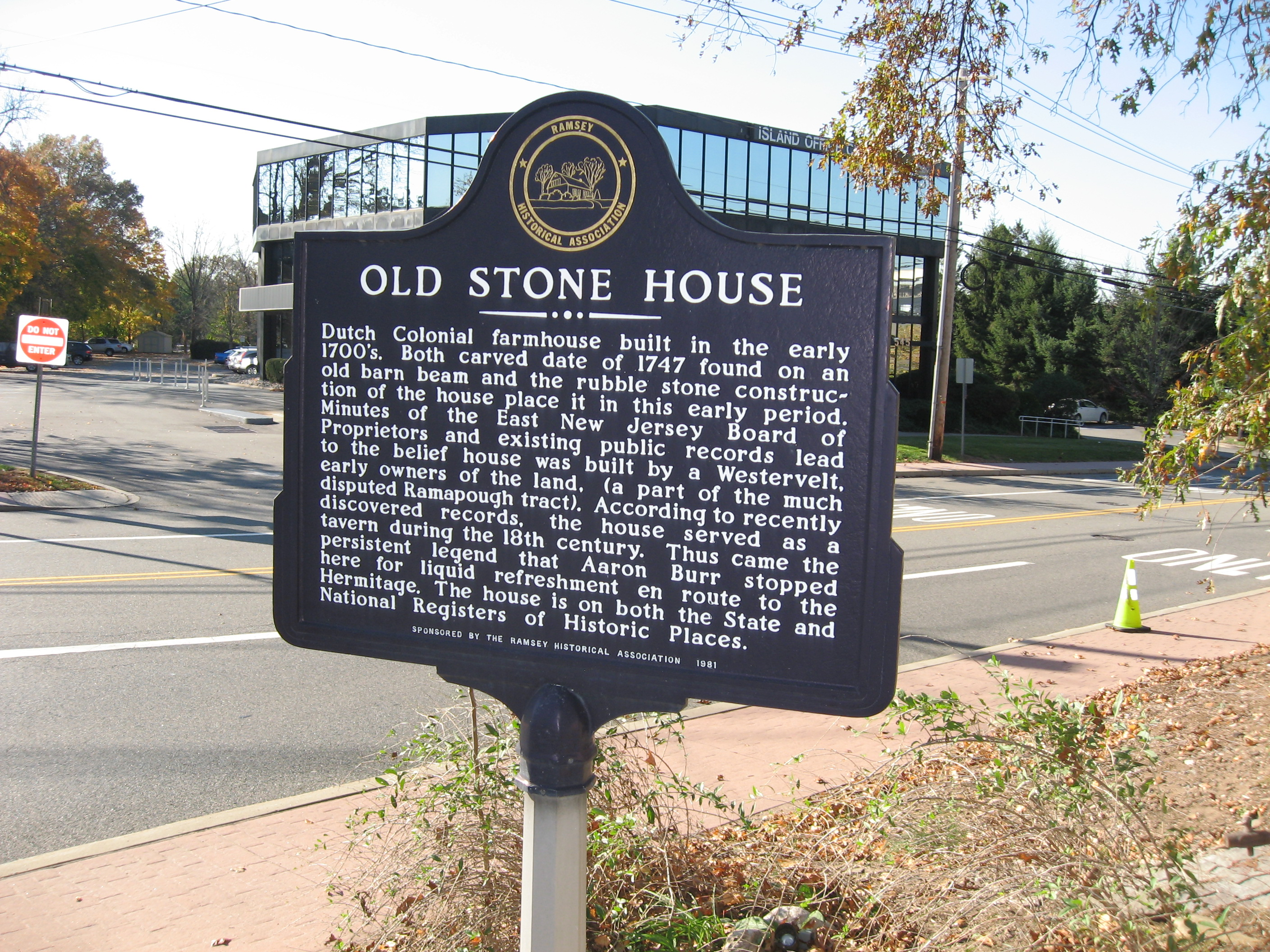
The Old Stone House historical marker

== Uses throughout the years ==
The Old Stone House's uses have been varied throughout the years. Originally it was built as a residence, but after its inhabitants departed it went through several transformations. It served some time as a stagecoach stop, where teams of horses were changed. Later in its life it was believed to have been a tavern. One undocumented but frequently told tale is that Aaron Burr stopped for the night for drink and sleep before he continued on to the Hermitage. In the Early 1950s the house and property were bought by the New Jersey Department of Transportation, with the intent to demolish the house in order to facilitate the construction of an overpass over Route 17. The State was convinced to spare the house by numerous petitions from groups including the Ramsey Women's Club.

== In film ==
In 2000, the "Stone by Stone" docudrama of the Old Stone House's history was recognized by the National Trust for Historic Preservation as a "Save America's treasures project."

== See also ==
- National Register of Historic Places listings in Bergen County, New Jersey
