= Paterson and Ramapo Railroad =

Overview
- Locale: Paterson, New Jersey to Suffern, New York
- Dates of operation: 1848–1852
- Successor: New York and Erie & Western Railroad

Technical
- Track gauge: 4 ft 8 1/2 in (1,435 mm) standard gauge

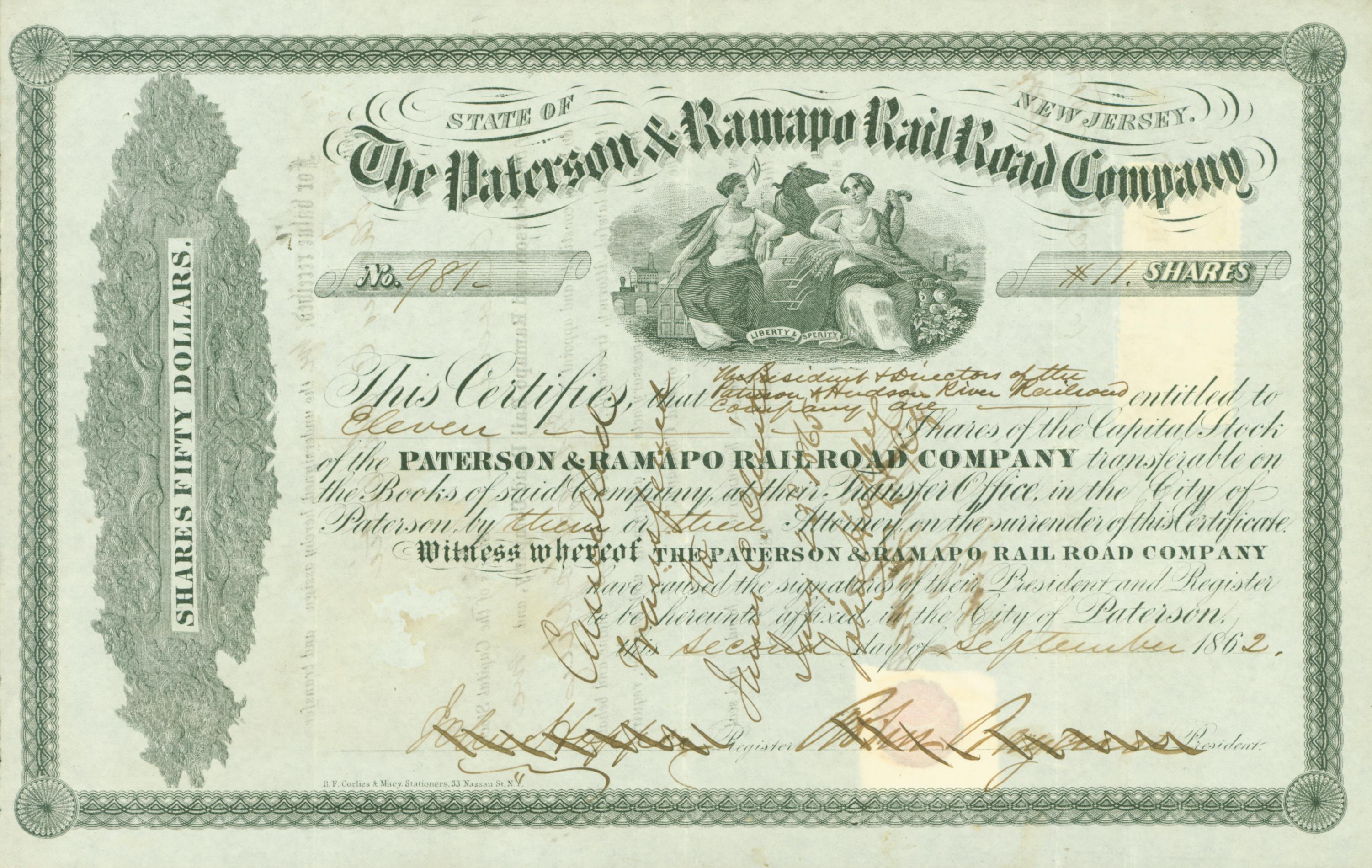
Share of the Paterson and Ramapo Rail Road Company, issued 2. September 1862

The Paterson and Ramapo Railroad was a railroad that operated mostly in New Jersey, connecting the city of and Paterson, New Jersey with Suffern, New York, just across the state line. The railroad was chartered in 1841 and construction began in 1847. It was created to form a connection between the Paterson and Hudson River Railroad, one of the earliest railroads in the United States, and the Erie Railroad in Suffern. The two Paterson railroads provided a shorter route from Suffern to New York City than did the New York and Erie Railroad.

The road served freight customers from the beginning, notably cotton mills in Ho-Ho-Kus, New Jersey. Several other factories, including a paper mill, were built due to the railroad.

The railroad opened in fall, 1849. The steam locomotives to operate on the line were ordered from Rogers Locomotive and Machine Works in Paterson.

In 1852, the New York and Erie Railroad leased the track rights of the P&HR and P&R and made their lines the new New York and Erie Railroad mainline. It added a third rail to make a 6 ft (1,829 mm) track as well.
