= Waldwick =

Waldwick may refer to the following:

== Places ==
United States

- Waldwick, New Jersey
  - Waldwick High School
  - Waldwick (NJT station)
  - Waldwick Public School District
- Waldwick, Wisconsin, a town
  - Waldwick (community), Wisconsin, an unincorporated community

== See also ==
- Waldwic in Hale County, Alabama
