= Erie Railroad Signal Tower, Waldwick Yard =

- U.S. National Register of Historic Places
- New Jersey Register of Historic Places
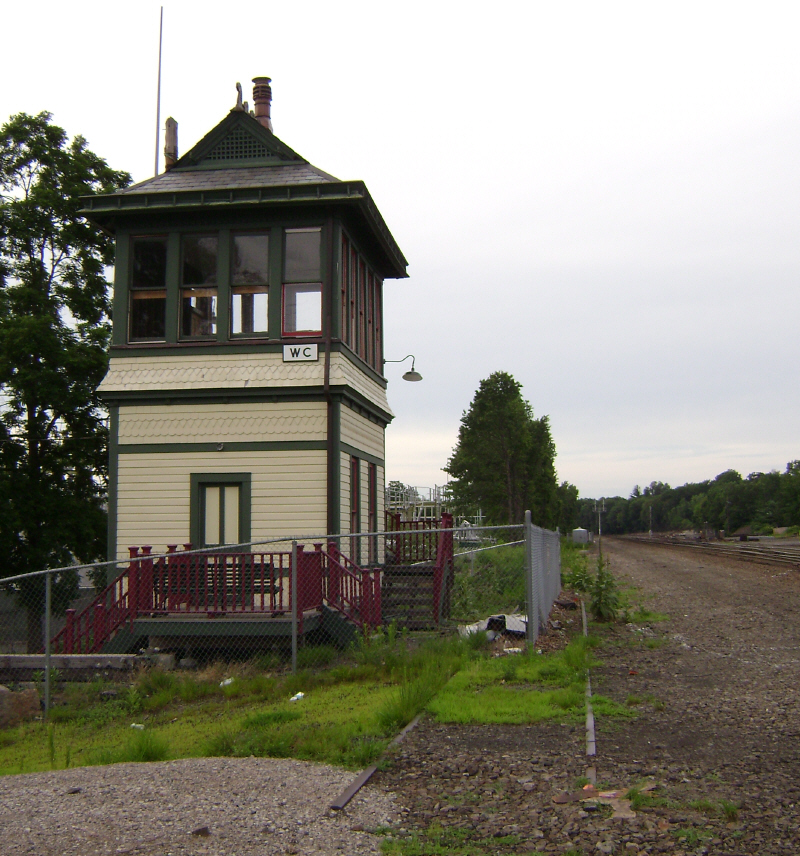

- Location within Bergen County, New Jersey Location within New Jersey Location within the United States
- Location: Northeast end of Bohnert Place, West side of Railroad Tracks, Waldwick, New Jersey
- Coordinates: 41°0′55″N 74°7′29″W
- Area: 0.1 acres (0.040 ha)
- Built: 1886
- Architectural style: Queen Anne
- NRHP reference No.: 87000847
- NJRHP No.: 714

Significant dates
- Added to NRHP: December 23, 1987
- Designated NJRHP: April 16, 1987

Erie Railroad Signal Tower, Waldwick Yard is located in Waldwick, Bergen County, New Jersey, United States. The tower was built in 1886 and was added to the National Register of Historic Places on December 23, 1987.

== Background ==
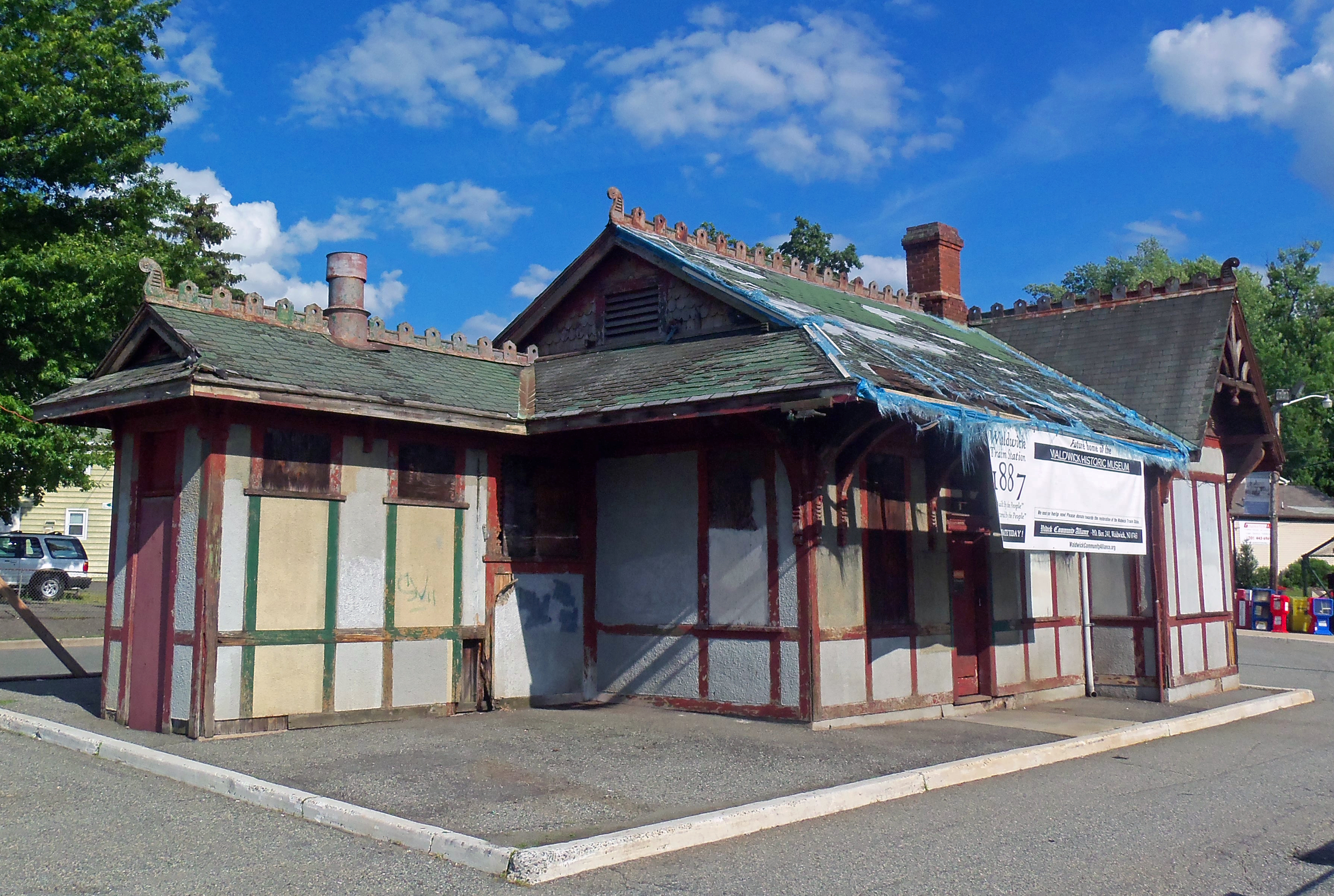
The original Waldwick station was built c. 1887.

Constructed in 1848, the Paterson and Ramapo Railroad through Waldwick created a connection between the Erie Railroad at Suffern, New York to Paterson, where it linked with the Paterson and Hudson River Railroad to the terminal and ferry in Jersey City. A station at Waldwick was established in 1887. The yard around the depot was expanded in 1890.

The building was abandoned by NJ Transit in 1986. The Waldwick Historical Society refurbished it during the early 2000s and in 2016 they completed the project.

== See also ==
- National Register of Historic Places listings in Bergen County, New Jersey
- Timeline of Jersey City area railroads
- Newark Branch
- Bergen County Line
