= Newark Branch =

Map

The Newark Branch was a branch of the Erie Railroad in New Jersey, United States, running between Jersey City and Paterson and passing through the Broadway Section in North Newark, the origin of its name. Inaugurated in the 1870s, the line was last used for passenger service on September 30, 1966, but continues to be used for freight service on a portion of its length.

== History ==
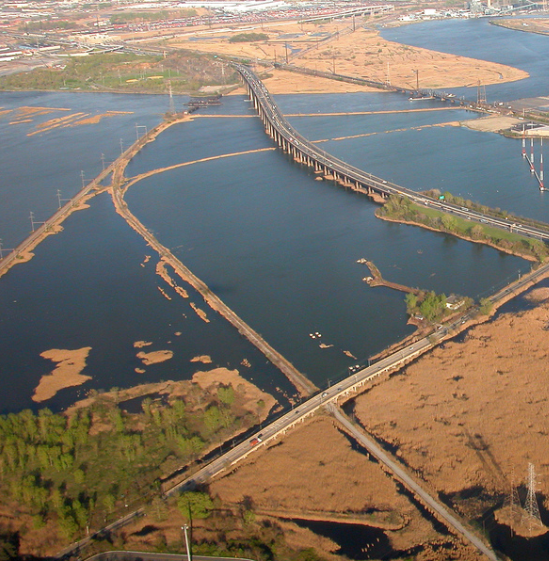
The Newark Branch (center) crossed the Jersey Meadows and converged with the NY&GL (left) nearby the DB Draw

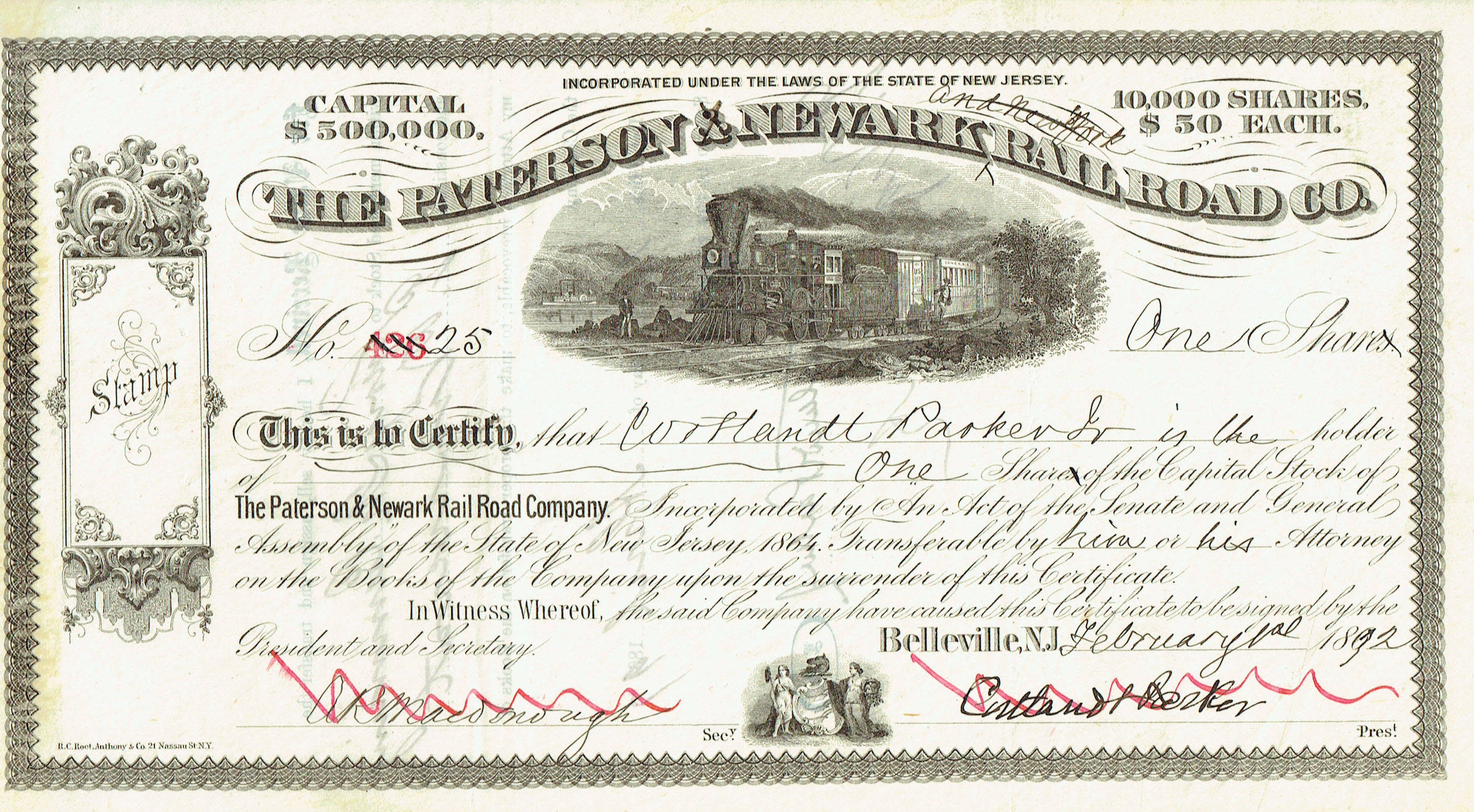
Share of the Paterson, Newark & New York Rail Road Company, issued 1 February 1892

The Paterson and Newark Railroad, a subsidiary of the Erie Railroad, was founded in 1864 and by 1869 had developed a 10.8 miles (17.4 km) right-of way (ROW) along the western banks of the Passaic between the two cities for which it was named. The line was conceived as a connection between Newark and Paterson, where a transfer was possible to Erie's Main Line southbound service to the Hudson Waterfront and ferries across the Hudson River to New York or northbound to New York State and the Midwest. Service began by 1870 but was hindered by unresolved issues with landowners opposed to the seizure of their riverfront property.

Originally a crossing of the Lower Passaic River was planned so trains from Newark could travel east using the New Jersey Railroad bridge, ROW, and terminal at Exchange Place in Jersey City. In 1871, construction began on a new alignment from Newark to Jersey City. The company was re-organized in 1872 and renamed the Paterson, Newark, and New York Railroad when a crossing was developed at the site of NX Bridge. Eventually trackage from the river crossing converged with the New York and Greenwoood Lake Railway, which crossed the Passaic to the north over the WR Draw. From that junction in the Kearny Meadows, the two lines continued east over the Hackensack River on the DB Draw to the Long Dock Tunnel through Bergen Hill, terminating at Erie's Pavonia Terminal.

== Service ==
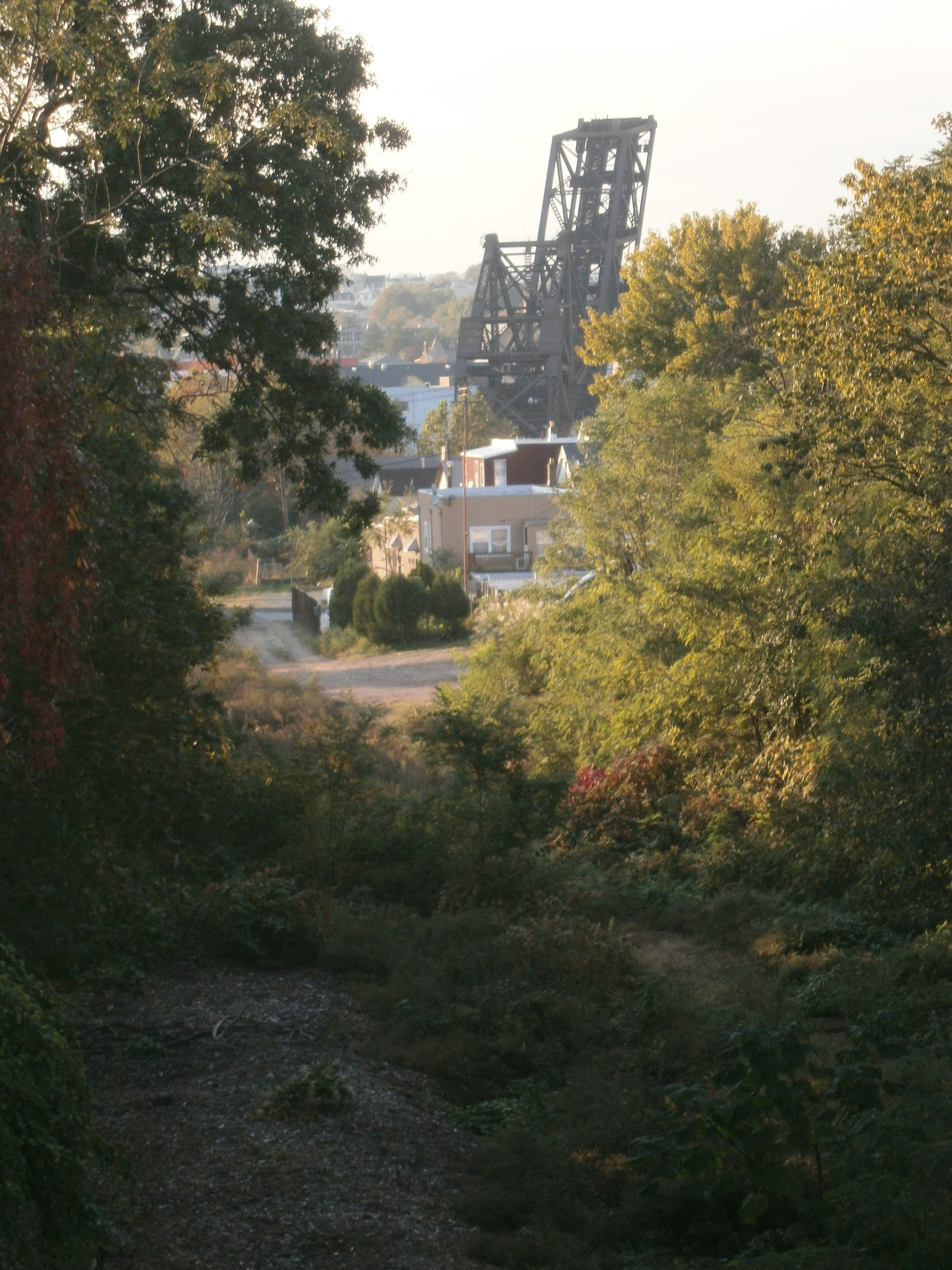
Looking west towards the NX Bridge from the right of way of the Newark Branch at the border of Kearny and East Newark

Passenger service on the line became known as the Newark Branch. From Pavonia Terminal, and later Hoboken Terminal, service ran west to Harrison and Kearny. After crossing the Passaic into Newark, it ran west of and parallel to the river to Belleville, Nutley, Clifton and Paterson with some continuing service to Glen Rock, Ridgewood, Ho-Ho-Kus, and Waldwick Like the Bergen County Line, the Newark Branch was a branch of the Main Line, both with service extending north to Waldwick laying over at nearby Waldwick Yard. Commuter operations on the Newark Branch were discontinued in October 1966.

== Status and re-use study ==
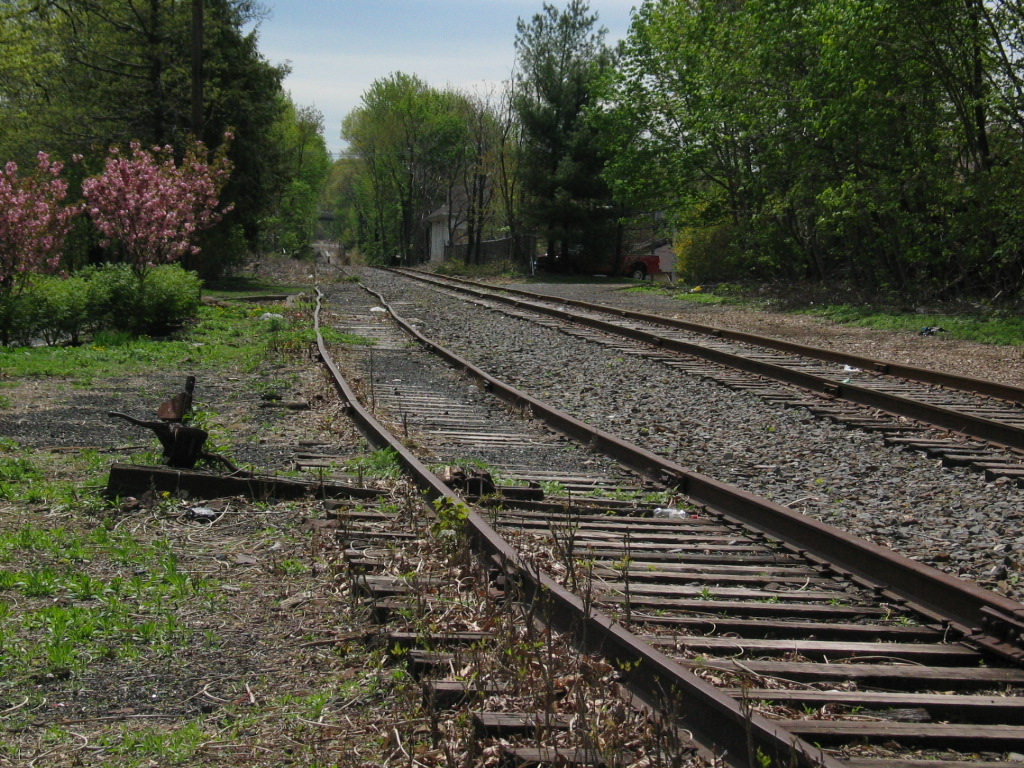
Newark Industrial in Nutley

By the 1960s, only one of the two tracks was in a suitable condition, The line became part of Conrail and later Norfolk Southern Railway. (NS). In 1977 the line was severed when the NX Bridge over the Passaic River was taken out of service and left in the open position. By 2002 the line east of the bridge was out of service. That was due to the loss of the last shipper on that portion of the branch, SparTech Poly-Com.

A portion of the line along the west bank of the Passaic River, known as the Newark Industrial Track, is still used to serve one customer in Clifton, Van Ness Plastics.

In 2020, the North Jersey Transportation Planning Authority, in conjunction with the Passaic County Planning Board, produced the Paterson–Newark Transit Market Study report, which examined the potential of restoring passenger service on the line.

== See also ==
- Timeline of Jersey City area railroads
- List of bridges, tunnels, and cuts in Hudson County, New Jersey
