= Albert Smith House =

Albert Smith House may refer to:

- Albert Smith House (Waldwick, New Jersey), listed on the National Register of Historic Places in Bergen County, New Jersey
- Albert Smith House (Salt Lake City, Utah), listed on the National Register of Historic Places in Salt Lake County, Utah
