= NX Bridge =

NX Bridge Annie Bridge
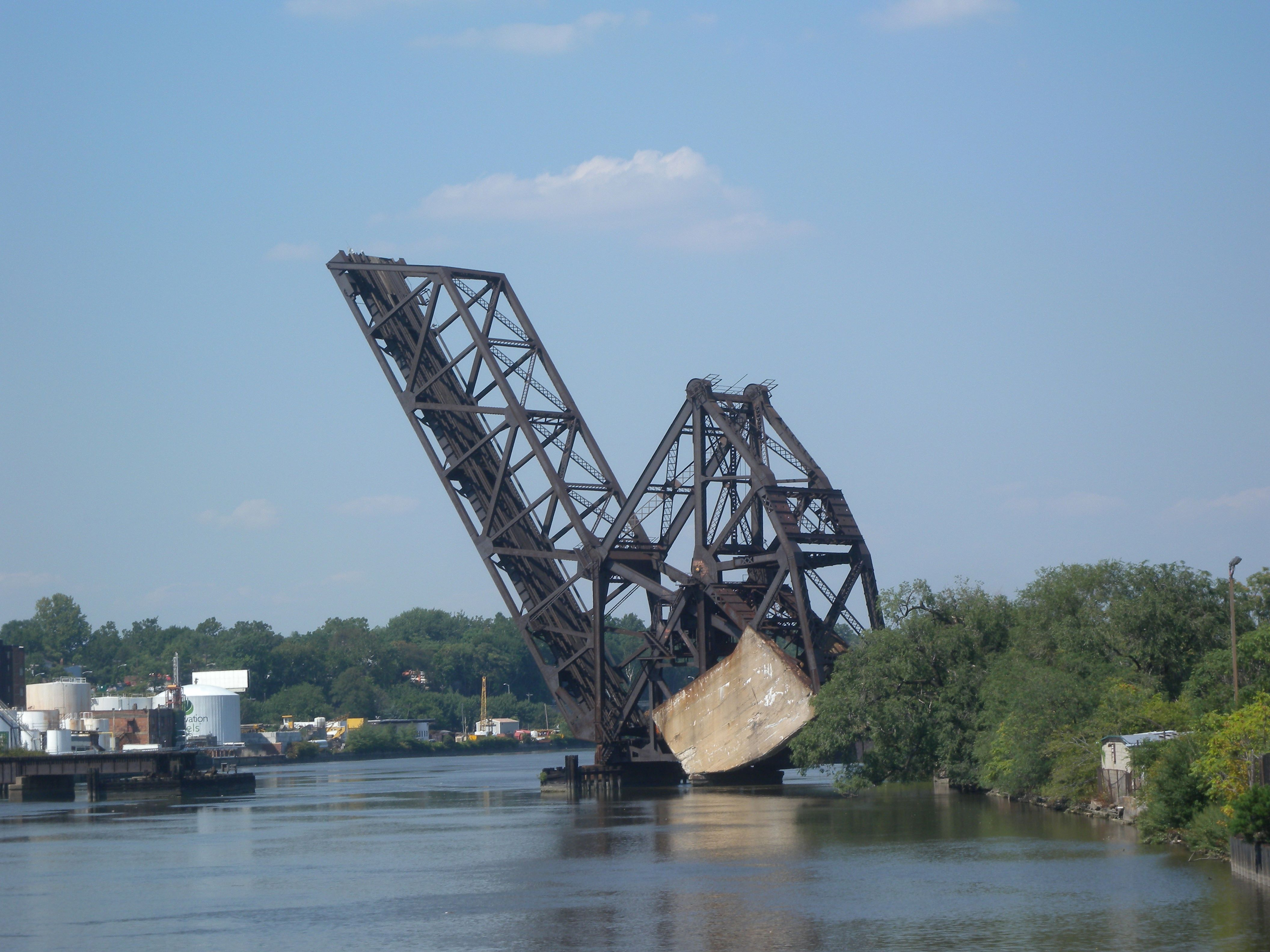
- Coordinates: 40°45′16″N 74°09′51″W
- Carries: Newark Branch (until 1977)
- Crosses: Passaic River
- Locale: Newark and Kearny; Northeastern New Jersey
- Other name(s): Bridge 8.04; Conrail 4th Avenue Bridge; The Annie Bridge
- Owner: Norfolk Southern

Characteristics
- Design: Bascule bridge
- No. of spans: 1
- Clearance above: 12 feet (3.7 m)

History
- Opened: 1922
- Closed: 1977

The NX Draw (sometimes colloquially known the "Annie Bridge") is an out-of-service railroad bridge on the Passaic River between Newark and Kearny, New Jersey. It is the 13th bridge from the river's mouth at Newark Bay and is 6.5 miles (10.5 km) upstream from it. The bascule bridge (sometimes called a jackknife bridge), built by the Erie Railroad and once part of its Newark Branch, has been abandoned in the raised position.

== History ==
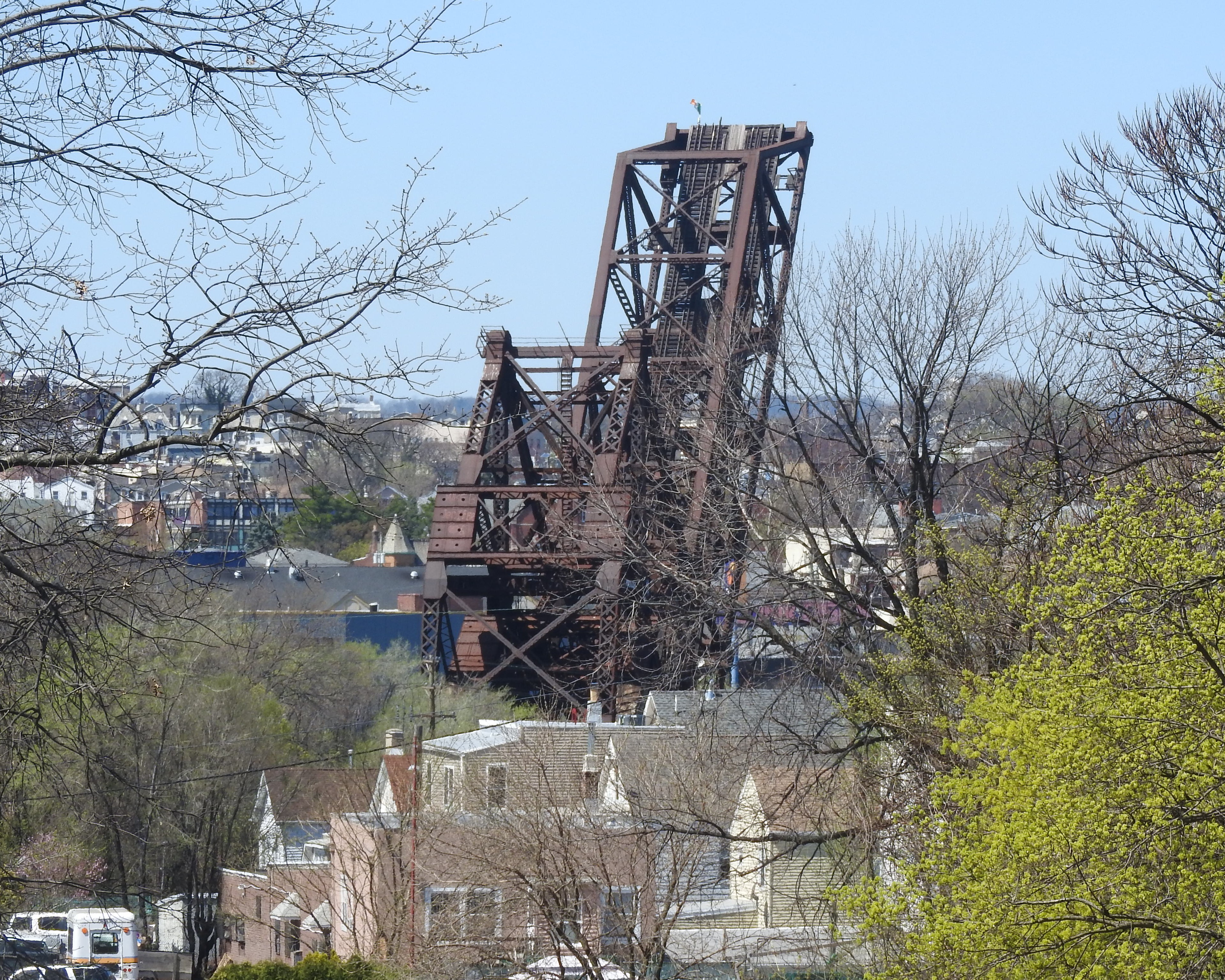
From Kearny Avenue and the Newark Branch, on the boundary of Kearny and the Clark Thread Company Historic District in East Newark

The lower 17 miles (27 km) of the 90-mile (140 km) long Passaic River downstream of the Dundee Dam is tidally influenced and navigable. Rail service across the river was generally oriented to bringing passengers and freight from the points west over the Hackensack Meadows to Bergen Hill, where tunnels and cuts provided access to rail terminals on the Hudson River. The NX is the third bridge to cross the river at its location, the first having been built in 1871.

=== Post Erie era ===
The bridge was built as a double-track structure, but after the elimination of commuter train service it was changed to have only a single track in service. Freight train service continued through the creation of Conrail in 1976, but the bridge was taken out of service by Conrail in November 1977. It has been locked in the raised (open) position ever since. The bridge is located within the North Jersey Shared Assets Area and is assigned to Norfolk Southern Railway. Conrail continued to serve both sides of the branch with local freight train service until 2002, when the eastern side of the branch was removed from active service, partly due to the loss of the last shipper on the branch, SparTech Poly-Com. A three-track trestle bridge over Passaic Avenue, just east of the NX bridge was removed in the mid-2000s to increase roadway clearance. On the west bank of the Passaic River, the Newark Industrial Track is still an active freight line serving several industries in the Newark area.

In 1982, the bridge was used in the filming of the movie Annie. It was left in its open position during the filming, though the structure itself was painted black, and the rails were painted silver. It has since become nicknamed the "Annie Bridge". Since the filming, the bridge has received no maintenance.

== See also ==
- Timeline of Jersey City area railroads
- List of crossings of the Lower Passaic River
- List of bridges, tunnels, and cuts in Hudson County, New Jersey
- List of bridges documented by the Historic American Engineering Record in New Jersey
