= Dave Fiore =

American football player (born 1974)

Doug Fiore
No. 74
- Position: Guard

Personal information
- Born: August 10, 1974 (age 52); Waldwick, New Jersey, U.S.
- Listed height: 6 ft 4 in (1.93 m)
- Listed weight: 293 lb (133 kg)

Career information
- High school: Waldwick
- College: Hofstra (1992–1995)
- NFL draft: 1996: undrafted

Career history
- San Francisco 49ers (1996); New York Jets (1996); San Francisco 49ers (1997–2002); Washington Redskins (2003)

Awards and highlights
- First-team I-AA All-American (1995); Hofstra Pride No. 74 retired
- Stats at Pro Football Reference

David Allan Fiore (born August 10, 1974) is an American former professional football player who was a guard in the National Football League (NFL) for the San Francisco 49ers and the Washington Redskins. He played college football for the Hofstra Flying Dutchmen.

== Early life ==
Fiore grew up in Waldwick, New Jersey and played high school football at Waldwick High School.
