= Waldwick Public School District =

School district in Bergen County, New Jersey, US

Address
- 155 Summit Avenue Waldwick, Bergen County, New Jersey, 07463; United States
- Coordinates: 41.015741°N 74.108783°W

District information
- Grades: PreK to 12
- Superintendent: Paul Casarico
- Business administrator: John Griffin
- Schools: 4

Students and staff
- Enrollment: 1,630 (as of 2020–21)
- Faculty: 141.3 FTEs
- Student–teacher ratio: 11.5:1

Other information
- District Factor Group: GH
- Website: www.waldwickschools.org
Ind.	Per pupil	District spending	Rank (*)	K-12 average	%± vs. average
1A	Total Spending	$19,050	32	$18,891	0.8%
1	Budgetary Cost	14,941	33	14,783	1.1%
2	Classroom Instruction	9,310	40	8,763	6.2%
6	Support Services	2,022	24	2,392	−15.5%
8	Administrative Cost	1,693	27	1,485	14.0%
10	Operations & Maintenance	1,452	16	1,783	−18.6%
13	Extracurricular Activities	440	27	268	64.2%
16	Median Teacher Salary	65,055	37	64,043
Data from NJDoE 2014 Taxpayers' Guide to Education Spending. *Of K-12 districts with up to 1,800 students. Lowest spending=1; Highest=49

The Waldwick Public School District is a comprehensive community public school district that serves students in pre-kindergarten through twelfth grade from Waldwick, in Bergen County, in the U.S. state of New Jersey.

As of the 2020–21 school year, the district, comprising four schools, had an enrollment of 1,630 students and 141.3 classroom teachers (on an FTE basis), for a student–teacher ratio of 11.5:1.

The district is classified by the New Jersey Department of Education as being in District Factor Group "GH", the third-highest of eight groupings. District Factor Groups organize districts statewide to allow comparison by common socioeconomic characteristics of the local districts. From lowest socioeconomic status to highest, the categories are A, B, CD, DE, FG, GH, I and J.

== Awards and recognition ==
During the 2009–10 school year, Julia A. Traphagen School was awarded the National Blue Ribbon School Award of Excellence by the United States Department of Education, the highest award an American school can receive. It was the only school in Bergen County that year out of ten schools honored statewide and the first Bergen County elementary school to receive the honor in six years.

== Schools ==
Schools in the district (with 2020–21 enrollment data from the National Center for Education Statistics) are:

Elementary schools

- Crescent School with 344 students in grades K–5
  - Brian R. Cannici, principal
- Julia A. Traphagen School with 425 students in grades PreK–5
  - Robert T. Sileo, principal

Middle school

- Waldwick Middle School with 367 students in grades 6–8
  - Michael J. Meyers, principal

High school

- Waldwick High School with 460 students in grades 9–12
  - Kevin Carroll, principal

== Administration ==
Core members of the district's administration are:

- Paul Casarico, superintendent
- John Griffin, business administrator and board secretary

== Board of education ==
The district's board of education is comprised of seven members who set policy and oversee the fiscal and educational operation of the district through its administration. As a Type II school district, the board's trustees are elected directly by voters to serve three-year terms of office on a staggered basis, with either two or three seats up for election each year held (since 2012) as part of the November general election. The board appoints a superintendent to oversee the district's day-to-day operations and a business administrator to supervise the business functions of the district.
