= Waldwick, New Jersey =

Borough in Bergen County, New Jersey, US

- Borough
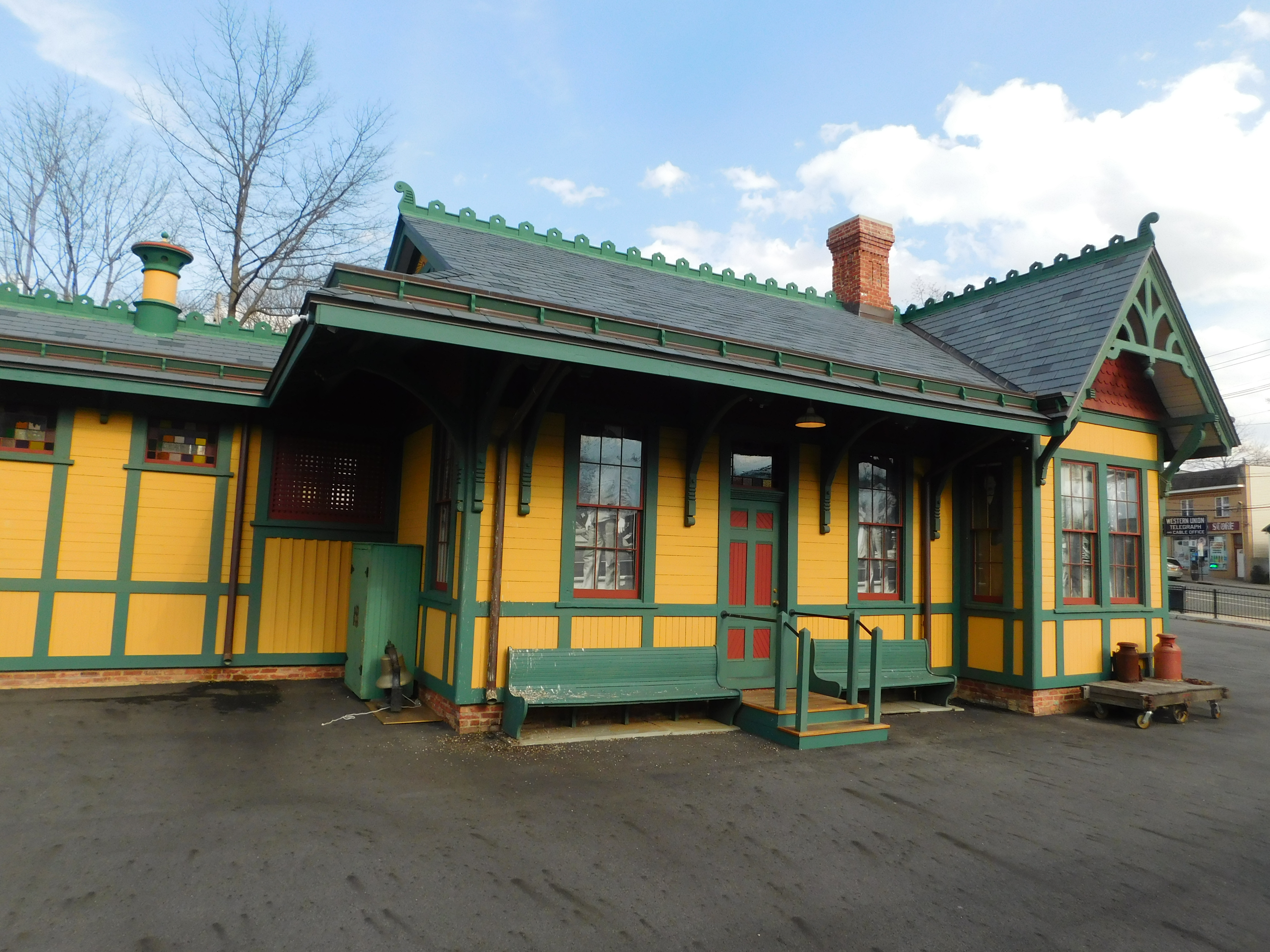
- Waldwick station in April 2018

- Seal
- Nickname: "The Light in the Woods"
- Motto: "The light in the woods"
- Location of Waldwick in Bergen County highlighted in red (left). Inset map: Location of Bergen County in New Jersey highlighted in orange (right).

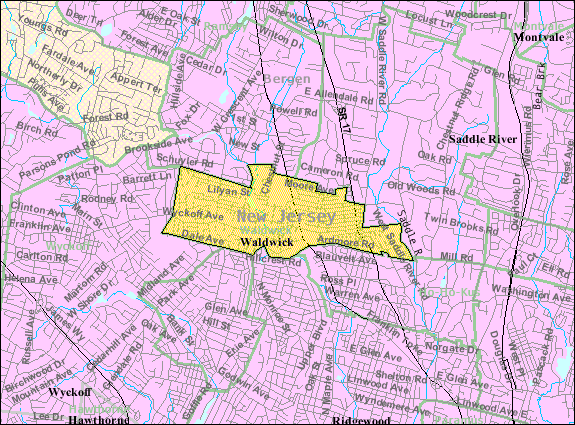
- Census Bureau map of Waldwick, New Jersey Interactive map of Waldwick, New Jersey

- Location in Bergen County Location in New Jersey Location in the United States
- Coordinates: 41.013367°N 74.125217°W
- Country: United States
- State: New Jersey
- County: Bergen
- Incorporated: April 1, 1919

Government
  - Type: Borough
  - Body: Borough Council
  - Mayor: Thomas A. Giordano (R, term ends December 31, 2023)
  - Administrator: Patrick C. Wherry
  - Municipal clerk: Kelley Halewicz

Area
  - Total: 2.07 sq mi (5.35 km^{2})
  - Land: 2.05 sq mi (5.30 km^{2})
  - Water: 0.019 sq mi (0.05 km^{2}) 0.97%
  - Rank: 408th of 565 in state 48th of 70 in county
- Elevation: 223 ft (68 m)

Population (2020)
  - Total: 10,058
  - Estimate (2023): 10,105
  - Rank: 243rd of 565 in state 39th of 70 in county
  - Density: 4,915.9/sq mi (1,898.0/km^{2})
  - Rank: 116th of 565 in state 30th of 70 in county
- Time zone: UTC−05:00 (EST)
  - Summer (DST): UTC−04:00 (Eastern (EDT))
- ZIP Code: 07463
- Area code: 201
- FIPS code: 3400376400
- GNIS feature ID: 0885429
- Website: www.waldwicknj.gov

Waldwick (/ˈwɔːldwɪk/) is a borough in Bergen County, in the U.S. state of New Jersey. As of the 2020 United States census, the borough's population was 10,058, an increase of 433 (+4.5%) from the 2010 census count of 9,625, which in turn reflected an increase of three people (+0.0%) from the 9,622 counted in the 2000 census.

== History ==
Originally inhabited during the pre-Columbian era by the Lenape Native American tribe, the region surrounding Waldwick was first explored by Europeans when a Dutch trading expedition landed near there in 1610. With the creation of the Nieuw Amsterdam colony in 1624, the present site of the borough became a Dutch possession along with the rest of northeastern New Jersey. During the period from 1624 to 1664 it was sparsely developed by Dutch settlers, mainly for agricultural purposes. With the annexation of Nieuw Amsterdam by the English in 1664 came a nearly instant increase in immigration to the region and the development of several settlements in and around the present borders of the borough.

In the mid-19th century, Waldwick and the surrounding area constituted a small settlement within Franklin Township, an area that encompassed much of northwestern Bergen County. The area's population grew significantly after the Erie Railroad established a train station. On January 1, 1886, Orvil Township was formed from portions of Hohokus Township and Washington Township. The "Boroughitis" phenomenon that swept through Bergen County, in which 26 boroughs were formed in the county in 1894 alone, hit Orvil Township particularly hard, resulting in the formation of five new boroughs created from the nascent township, including Montvale and Woodcliff (now Woodcliff Lake) on August 31, 1894, Allendale on November 10, 1894, Saddle River on November 20, 1894, and Upper Saddle River formed on November 22, 1894. On April 7, 1919, a council of citizens voted to incorporate as the borough of "Waldwick", from the remaining portions of Orvil Township. With the creation of the borough of Waldwick, Orvil Township was dissolved.

Various derivations of the borough's name have been offered, including one that "Waldwick" is Old English, from "wald" (forest) and "wick" (settlement or place). According to The History of Bergen County written in 1900 by James M. Van Valen, the name Waldwick comes from a Saxon language word meaning "beautiful grove" though other sources show a related meaning of "village in a grove".

=== Historic places ===
Waldwick is home to the following historic places listed on the National Register of Historic Places:

- Erie Railroad Signal Tower, Waldwick Yard – Northeast end of Bonhert Place, west side of railroad tracks (listed 1983). Built in 1848 for the Erie Railroad.
- Albert Smith House – 289 Wyckoff Avenue, built in 1750
- Waldwick Railroad Station – Hewson Avenue and Prospect Streets (listed 1978). The station opened in 1886 as a station along the Erie Railroad.
- White Tenant House – 16 White's Lane (listed 1983, now demolished)

== Geography ==
According to the United States Census Bureau, the borough had a total area of 2.07 square miles (5.35 km^{2}), including 2.05 square miles (5.30 km^{2}) of land and 0.02 square miles (0.05 km^{2}) of water (0.97%).

The borough is surrounded by the Bergen County municipalities of Allendale, Ho-Ho-Kus, Midland Park, Ridgewood, Saddle River and Wyckoff.

The Ho-Ho-Kus Brook flows through the center of the borough in a roughly southward direction.

== Demographics ==
Historical population
| Census | Pop. | Note | %± |
|---|---|---|---|
| 1900 | 1,207 | | — |
| 1910 | 970 | * | −19.6% |
| 1920 | 1,296 | | 33.6% |
| 1930 | 1,728 | | 33.3% |
| 1940 | 2,475 | | 43.2% |
| 1950 | 3,963 | | 60.1% |
| 1960 | 10,495 | | 164.8% |
| 1970 | 12,313 | | 17.3% |
| 1980 | 10,802 | | −12.3% |
| 1990 | 9,757 | | −9.7% |
| 2000 | 9,622 | | −1.4% |
| 2010 | 9,625 | | 0.0% |
| 2020 | 10,058 | | 4.5% |
| 2023 (est.) | 10,105 | ▲ | 0.5% |
Population sources: 1900–1920 1900–1910; 1910–1930 1900–2020; 2000 2010 2020 * = Lost territory in previous decade.

=== Racial and ethnic composition ===
Waldwick borough, New Jersey – Racial and ethnic composition Note: the US Census treats Hispanic/Latino as an ethnic category. This table excludes Latinos from the racial categories and assigns them to a separate category. Hispanics/Latinos may be of any race.
| Race / Ethnicity (NH = Non-Hispanic) | Pop 2000 | Pop 2010 | Pop 2020 | % 2000 | % 2010 | % 2020 |
|---|---|---|---|---|---|---|
| White alone (NH) | 8,545 | 8,122 | 7,701 | 88.81% | 84.38% | 76.57% |
| Black or African American alone (NH) | 57 | 74 | 126 | 0.59% | 0.77% | 1.25% |
| Native American or Alaska Native alone (NH) | 3 | 9 | 6 | 0.03% | 0.09% | 0.06% |
| Asian alone (NH) | 434 | 478 | 640 | 4.51% | 4.97% | 6.36% |
| Native Hawaiian or Pacific Islander alone (NH) | 0 | 0 | 0 | 0.00% | 0.00% | 0.00% |
| Other race alone (NH) | 7 | 8 | 31 | 0.07% | 0.08% | 0.31% |
| Mixed race or Multiracial (NH) | 65 | 104 | 239 | 0.68% | 1.08% | 2.38% |
| Hispanic or Latino (any race) | 511 | 830 | 1,315 | 5.31% | 8.62% | 13.07% |
| Total | 9,622 | 9,625 | 10,058 | 100.00% | 100.00% | 100.00% |

=== 2020 census ===
As of the 2020 census, Waldwick had a population of 10,058. The median age was 40.7 years. 23.6% of residents were under the age of 18 and 16.2% of residents were 65 years of age or older. For every 100 females there were 98.0 males, and for every 100 females age 18 and over there were 94.4 males age 18 and over.

100.0% of residents lived in urban areas, while 0.0% lived in rural areas.

There were 3,577 households in Waldwick, of which 37.2% had children under the age of 18 living in them. Of all households, 64.6% were married-couple households, 10.9% were households with a male householder and no spouse or partner present, and 21.0% were households with a female householder and no spouse or partner present. About 18.3% of all households were made up of individuals and 10.2% had someone living alone who was 65 years of age or older.

There were 3,691 housing units, of which 3.1% were vacant. The homeowner vacancy rate was 0.9% and the rental vacancy rate was 5.1%.

=== 2010 census ===
The 2010 United States census counted 9,625 people, 3,420 households, and 2,681 families in the borough. The population density was 4,656.8 per square mile (1,798.0/km^{2}). There were 3,537 housing units at an average density of 1,711.3 per square mile (660.7/km^{2}). The racial makeup was 90.63% (8,723) White, 1.08% (104) Black or African American, 0.11% (11) Native American, 4.99% (480) Asian, 0.00% (0) Pacific Islander, 1.76% (169) from other races, and 1.43% (138) from two or more races. Hispanic or Latino of any race were 8.62% (830) of the population.

Of the 3,420 households, 37.4% had children under the age of 18; 66.1% were married couples living together; 9.1% had a female householder with no husband present and 21.6% were non-families. Of all households, 18.5% were made up of individuals and 10.0% had someone living alone who was 65 years of age or older. The average household size was 2.81 and the average family size was 3.20.

25.2% of the population were under the age of 18, 6.2% from 18 to 24, 25.3% from 25 to 44, 28.7% from 45 to 64, and 14.5% who were 65 years of age or older. The median age was 41.2 years. For every 100 females, the population had 97.8 males. For every 100 females ages 18 and older there were 93.9 males.

The Census Bureau's 2006–2010 American Community Survey showed that (in 2010 inflation-adjusted dollars) median household income was $95,774 (with a margin of error of +/− $7,836) and the median family income was $104,335 (+/− $12,466). Males had a median income of $66,838 (+/− $8,541) versus $57,137 (+/− $6,800) for females. The per capita income for the borough was $41,689 (+/− $3,047). About 2.8% of families and 3.5% of the population were below the poverty line, including 5.2% of those under age 18 and 5.1% of those age 65 or over.

Same-sex couples headed 16 households in 2010, an increase from the 10 counted in 2000.

=== 2000 census ===
As of the 2000 United States census there were 9,622 people, 3,428 households, and 2,677 families residing in the borough. The population density was 4,616.2 inhabitants per square mile (1,782.3/km^{2}). There were 3,495 housing units at an average density of 1,676.8 per square mile (647.4/km^{2}). The racial makeup of the borough was 92.68% White, 0.59% African American, 0.04% Native American, 4.52% Asian, 1.31% from other races, and 0.85% from two or more races. Hispanic or Latino of any race were 5.31% of the population.

There were 3,428 households, out of which 36.3% had children under the age of 18 living with them, 67.5% were married couples living together, 7.8% had a female householder with no husband present, and 21.9% were non-families. 18.7% of all households were made up of individuals, and 10.6% had someone living alone who was 65 years of age or older. The average household size was 2.81 and the average family size was 3.22.

In the borough the population was spread out, with 25.5% under the age of 18, 5.3% from 18 to 24, 31.5% from 25 to 44, 22.5% from 45 to 64, and 15.2% who were 65 years of age or older. The median age was 38 years. For every 100 females, there were 94.8 males. For every 100 females age 18 and over, there were 92.0 males.

The median income for a household in the borough was $75,532, and the median income for a family was $82,208. Males had a median income of $60,671 versus $37,145 for females. The per capita income for the borough was $30,733. About 1.3% of families and 2.1% of the population were below the poverty line, including 1.7% of those under age 18 and 3.0% of those age 65 or over.

== Government ==
=== Local government ===
Waldwick is governed under the borough form of New Jersey municipal government, which is used in 218 municipalities (of the 564) statewide, making it the most common form of government in New Jersey. The governing body is comprised of a mayor and a borough council, with all positions elected at-large on a partisan basis as part of the November general election. A mayor is elected directly by the voters to a four-year term of office. The borough council includes six members elected to serve three-year terms on a staggered basis, with two seats coming up for election each year in a three-year cycle. The borough form of government used by Waldwick is a "weak mayor / strong council" government in which council members act as the legislative body with the mayor presiding at meetings and voting only in the event of a tie. The mayor can veto ordinances subject to an override by a two-thirds majority vote of the council. The mayor makes committee and liaison assignments for council members, and most appointments are made by the mayor with the advice and consent of the council.

As of 2023, the mayor of Waldwick is Republican Thomas A. Giordano, whose term of office ends December 31, 2023. Members of the borough council (with party affiliation and term-end year listed in parentheses) are Council President Paul Schatz (R, 2023), Kathleen E. Cericola (R, 2024), Michael F. Ritchie Jr. (R, 2024), Don Sciolaro (R, 2025), Theresa Sherman (R, 2023) and Michele S. Weber (R, 2025).

=== Federal, state and county representation ===
Waldwick is located in the 5th Congressional District and is part of New Jersey's 39th state legislative district.

For the 119th United States Congress, New Jersey's 5th congressional district is represented by Josh Gottheimer (D, Wyckoff). New Jersey is represented in the United States Senate by Democrats Cory Booker (Newark, term ends 2027) and Andy Kim (Moorestown, term ends 2031).

For the 2026–2027 session, the 39th legislative district of the New Jersey Legislature is represented in the State Senate by Holly Schepisi (R, River Vale) and in the General Assembly by Robert Auth (R, Old Tappan) and John V. Azzariti (R, Saddle River).

Bergen County is governed by a directly elected County Executive, with legislative functions performed by a Board of County Commissioners comprised of seven members who are elected at-large to three-year terms in partisan elections on a staggered basis, with either two or three seats coming up for election each November; a Chairman and Vice Chairman are selected from among its seven members at a reorganization meeting held every January. As of 2025, the county executive is James J. Tedesco III (D, Paramus), whose four-year term of office ends December 31, 2026.

Bergen County's Commissioners are Chair Mary J. Amoroso (D, Mahwah, 2025), Vice Chair Steven A. Tanelli (D, North Arlington, 2027), Chair Pro Tem Joan Voss (D, Fort Lee, 2026), Rafael Marte (D, Bergenfield, 2026), Germaine M. Ortiz (D, Emerson, 2025), Thomas J. Sullivan Jr. (D, Montvale, 2025) and Tracy Silna Zur (D, Franklin Lakes, 2027).

Bergen County's elected constitutional officials are Clerk John S. Hogan (D, Northvale, 2026), Sheriff Anthony Cureton (D, Englewood, 2027) and Surrogate Michael R. Dressler (D, Cresskill, 2026).

=== Politics ===
As of March 2011, there were a total of 6,277 registered voters in Waldwick, of which 1,429 (22.8% vs. 31.7% countywide) were registered as Democrats, 1,617 (25.8% vs. 21.1%) were registered as Republicans and 3,227 (51.4% vs. 47.1%) were registered as Unaffiliated. There were 4 voters registered as Libertarians or Greens. Among the borough's 2010 Census population, 65.2% (vs. 57.1% in Bergen County) were registered to vote, including 87.2% of those ages 18 and over (vs. 73.7% countywide).

Gubernatorial election results for Waldwick
| Year | Republican | | Democratic | | Third party(ies) | |
| Year | No. | % | No. | % | No. | % |
|---|---|---|---|---|---|---|
| 2025 | 2,308 | 49.12% | 2,378 | 50.61% | 13 | 0.28% |
| 2021 | 2,125 | 53.11% | 1,853 | 46.31% | 23 | 0.57% |
| 2017 | 1,391 | 48.00% | 1,432 | 49.41% | 75 | 2.59% |
| 2013 | 2,018 | 65.73% | 1,010 | 32.90% | 42 | 1.37% |
| 2009 | 1,883 | 53.99% | 1,376 | 39.45% | 229 | 6.57% |
| 2005 | 1,612 | 49.78% | 1,541 | 47.59% | 85 | 2.63% |

In the 2016 presidential election, Republican Donald Trump received 2,746 votes (51.9% vs. 41.1% countywide), ahead of Democrat Hillary Clinton with 2,311 votes (43.6% vs. 54.2%) and other candidates with 239 votes (4.5% vs. 4.6%), among the 5,357 ballots cast by the borough's 6,880 registered voters, for a turnout of 77.9% (vs. 72.5% in Bergen County). In the 2012 presidential election, Republican Mitt Romney received 2,606 votes (53.6% vs. 43.5% countywide), ahead of Democrat Barack Obama with 2,169 votes (44.6% vs. 54.8%) and other candidates with 50 votes (1.0% vs. 0.9%), among the 4,861 ballots cast by the borough's 6,543 registered voters, for a turnout of 74.3% (vs. 70.4% in Bergen County). In the 2008 presidential election, Republican John McCain received 2,800 votes (53.4% vs. 44.5% countywide), ahead of Democrat Barack Obama with 2,353 votes (44.9% vs. 53.9%) and other candidates with 51 votes (1.0% vs. 0.8%), among the 5,239 ballots cast by the borough's 6,529 registered voters, for a turnout of 80.2% (vs. 76.8% in Bergen County). In the 2004 presidential election, Republican George W. Bush received 2,891 votes (56.9% vs. 47.2% countywide), ahead of Democrat John Kerry with 2,141 votes (42.1% vs. 51.7%) and other candidates with 33 votes (0.6% vs. 0.7%), among the 5,084 ballots cast by the borough's 6,281 registered voters, for a turnout of 80.9% (vs. 76.9% in the whole county).

United States presidential election results for Waldwick 2024 2020 2016 2012 2008 2004
| Year | Republican | | Democratic | | Third party(ies) | |
| Year | No. | % | No. | % | No. | % |
|---|---|---|---|---|---|---|
| 2024 | 3,033 | 51.44% | 2,773 | 47.03% | 90 | 1.53% |
| 2020 | 2,965 | 47.69% | 3,161 | 50.84% | 91 | 1.46% |
| 2016 | 2,746 | 51.85% | 2,311 | 43.64% | 239 | 4.51% |
| 2012 | 2,606 | 54.01% | 2,169 | 44.95% | 50 | 1.04% |
| 2008 | 2,800 | 53.80% | 2,353 | 45.22% | 51 | 0.98% |
| 2004 | 2,891 | 57.08% | 2,141 | 42.27% | 33 | 0.65% |

In the 2013 gubernatorial election, Republican Chris Christie received 65.7% of the vote (2,018 cast), ahead of Democrat Barbara Buono with 32.9% (1,010 votes), and other candidates with 1.4% (42 votes), among the 3,110 ballots cast by the borough's 6,356 registered voters (40 ballots were spoiled), for a turnout of 48.9%. In the 2009 gubernatorial election, Republican Chris Christie received 1,883 votes (53.6% vs. 45.8% countywide), ahead of Democrat Jon Corzine with 1,376 votes (39.1% vs. 48.0%), Independent Chris Daggett with 208 votes (5.9% vs. 4.7%) and other candidates with 21 votes (0.6% vs. 0.5%), among the 3,515 ballots cast by the borough's 6,404 registered voters, yielding a 54.9% turnout (vs. 50.0% in the county).

United States Senate election results for Waldwick1
| Year | Republican | | Democratic | | Third party(ies) | |
| Year | No. | % | No. | % | No. | % |
|---|---|---|---|---|---|---|
| 2024 | 2,854 | 50.99% | 2,670 | 47.70% | 73 | 1.30% |
| 2018 | 2,114 | 52.92% | 1,732 | 43.35% | 149 | 3.73% |
| 2012 | 2,268 | 51.77% | 2,036 | 46.47% | 77 | 1.76% |
| 2006 | 1,777 | 54.66% | 1,432 | 44.05% | 42 | 1.29% |

United States Senate election results for Waldwick2
| Year | Republican | | Democratic | | Third party(ies) | |
| Year | No. | % | No. | % | No. | % |
|---|---|---|---|---|---|---|
| 2020 | 2,922 | 47.88% | 3,079 | 50.45% | 102 | 1.67% |
| 2014 | 1,530 | 50.45% | 1,451 | 47.84% | 52 | 1.71% |
| 2013 | 1,016 | 53.76% | 858 | 45.40% | 16 | 0.85% |
| 2008 | 2,450 | 52.03% | 2,201 | 46.74% | 58 | 1.23% |

== Education ==
Students in pre-kindergarten through twelfth grade are educated in the Waldwick Public School District. As of the 2020–21 school year, the district, comprised of four schools, had an enrollment of 1,630 students and 141.3 classroom teachers (on an FTE basis), for a student–teacher ratio of 11.5:1. Schools in the district (with 2020–21 enrollment data from the National Center for Education Statistics) are Crescent School with 344 students in grades K–5, Julia A. Traphagen School with 425 students in grades Pre-K–5, Waldwick Middle School with 367 students in grades 6–8 and Waldwick High School with 460 students in grades 9–12.

During the 2009–10 school year, Julia A. Traphagen School was awarded the Blue Ribbon School Award of Excellence by the United States Department of Education, the highest award an American school can receive. It was the only school in Bergen County that year out of ten schools honored statewide and the first Bergen County elementary school to receive the honor in six years.

Public school students from the borough, and all of Bergen County, are eligible to attend the secondary education programs offered by the Bergen County Technical Schools, which include the Bergen County Academies in Hackensack, and the Bergen Tech campus in Teterboro or Paramus. The district offers programs on a shared-time or full-time basis, with admission based on a selective application process and tuition covered by the student's home school district.

In addition, Waldwick is home of the Waldwick Seventh-day Adventist School; The Village School, a Montessori school for children though 8th grade; and The Forum School, which is an alternative school established in 1954 for students who are developmentally disabled. Pre-school programs are also offered at Rainbow Corners day school, at the Methodist Church, Building Blocks Child Center at Christ Community Church (across from the high school), Building Blocks and at Saddle Acres School.

== Transportation ==
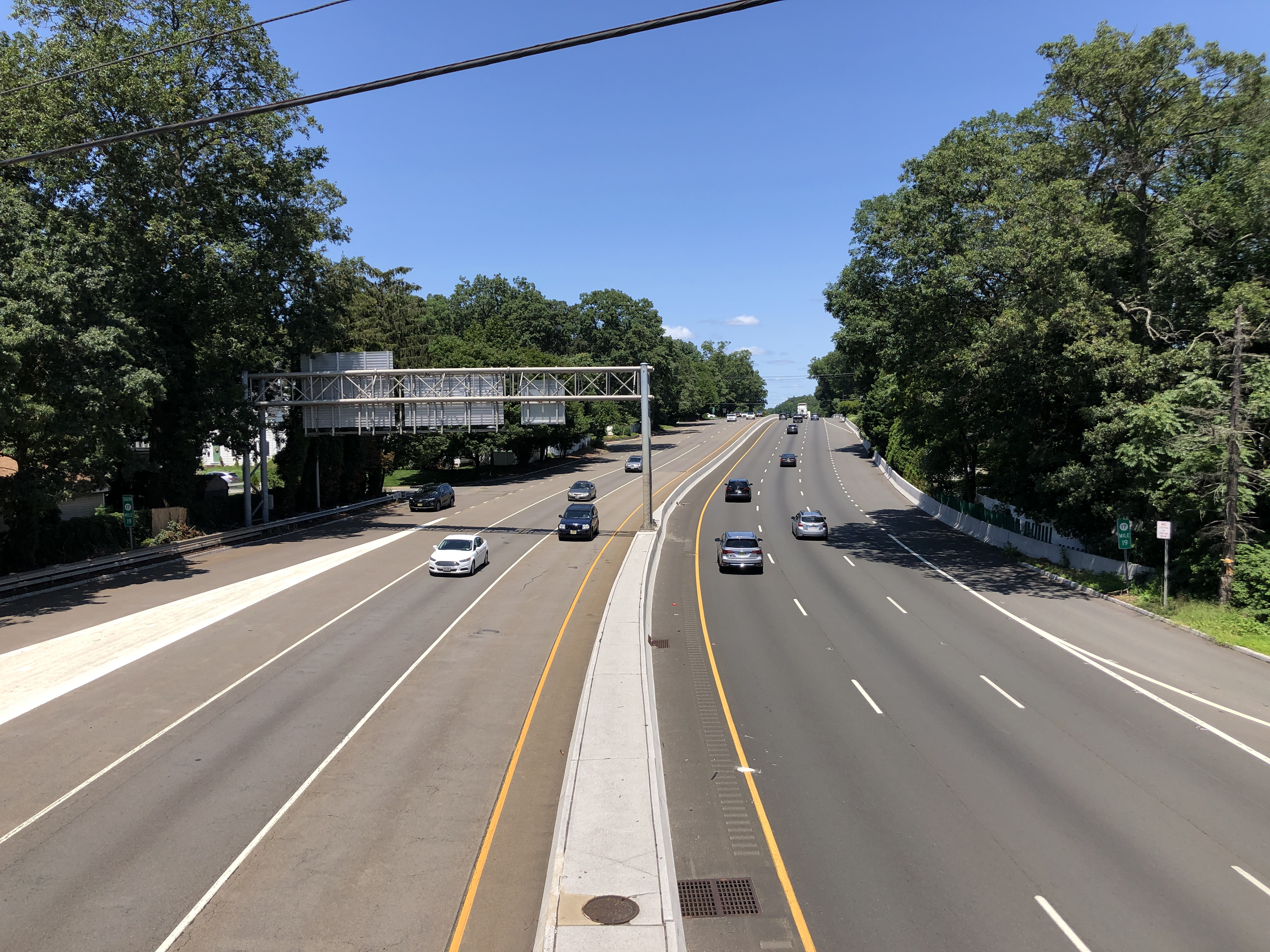
Route 17 northbound in Waldwick

=== Roads and highways ===
As of May 2010, the borough had a total of 36.30 miles (58.42 km) of roadways, of which 31.86 miles (51.27 km) were maintained by the municipality, 3.77 miles (6.07 km) by Bergen County and 0.67 miles (1.08 km) by the New Jersey Department of Transportation.

Roadways travelling through Waldwick include Route 17, County Route 502 and County Route 507.

=== Public transportation ===
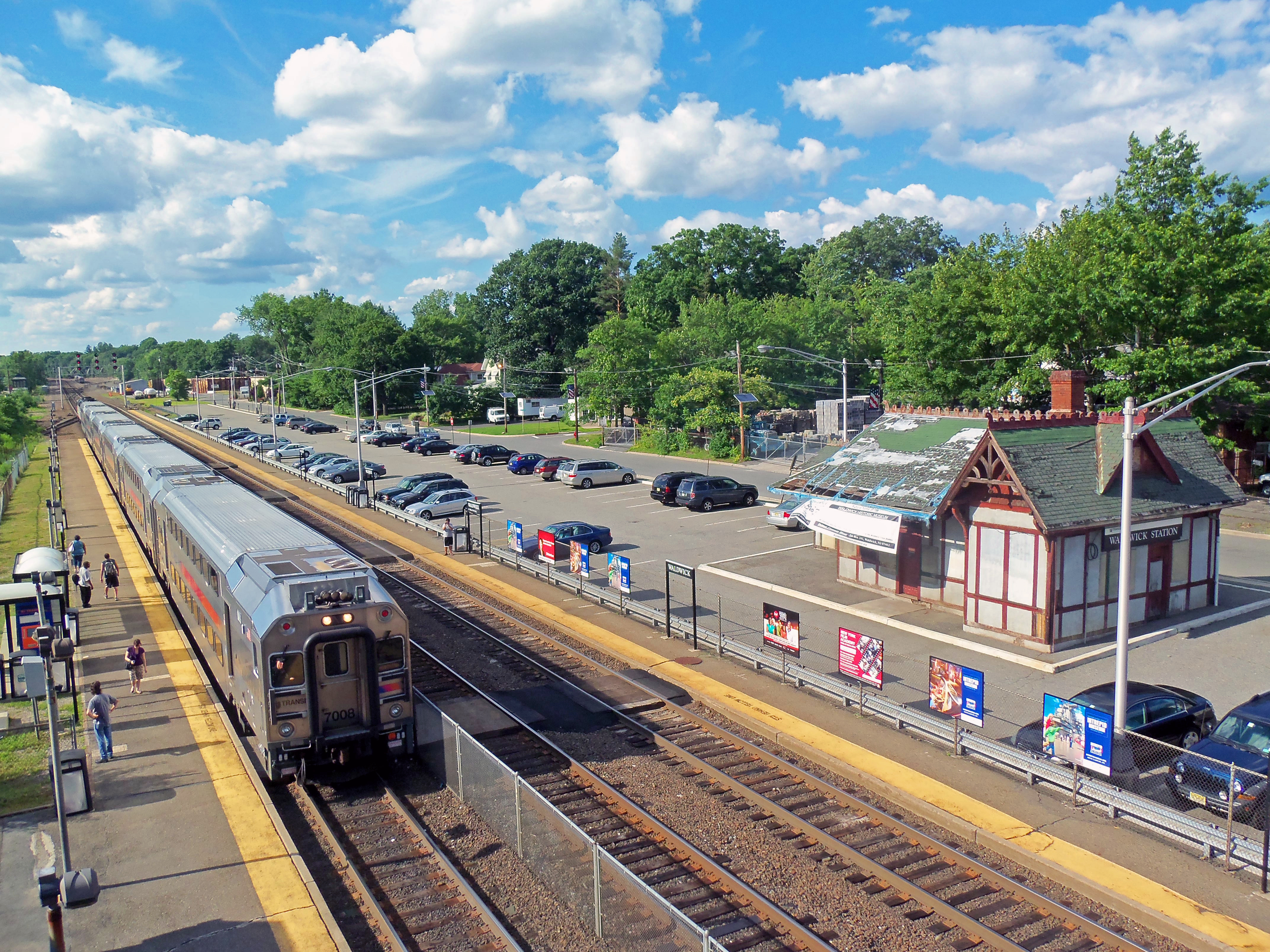
Waldwick Station

Waldwick is served by NJ Transit at the Waldwick train station, located at the intersection of West Prospect Street, Lafayette Place and Hewson Avenue. The station is served by both the Bergen County Line and Main Line, which run north–south to Hoboken Terminal with connections via the Secaucus Junction transfer station to New York Penn Station and to other NJ Transit rail service. Connections are available at the Hoboken Terminal to other NJ Transit rail lines, the PATH train at the Hoboken PATH station, New York Waterways ferry service to the World Financial Center and other destinations along with Hudson-Bergen Light Rail service.

Bus service between Waldwick and the Port Authority Bus Terminal in Midtown Manhattan is available via Short Line.

== Awards ==
=== Safest Small Town in America ===
In 2017, Waldwick was ranked the "Safest Small Town in America". This title was awarded based on 2015 FBI crime statistic data on the number of violent crimes per 1,000 residents. The rankings were done by LendEDU, a company known for its studies. By their definition, a small town has a population of over 5,000 yet under 10,000. At the time of the ranking, Waldwick had 9,997 residents.

== Notable people ==
People who were born in, residents of, or otherwise closely associated with Waldwick include:

- Jim Alexander (born 1935), documentary photographer, photojournalist and activist
- Enzo Amore (born 1986), professional wrestler formerly under contract with WWE
- Martha Byrne (born 1969), actress who performed on Broadway as a child in Annie and as an adult in the role of Lily Walsh in As the World Turns
- Jay Dittamo (born 1959), drummer, percussionist and music producer
- Warren Farrell (born 1943), educator, gender equality activist and author
- Dave Fiore (born 1974), former pro football player
- Joe Harasymiak (born 1986), defensive coordinator for the Rutgers football team.
- Frank Herbert (1931–2018), former member of the New Jersey Senate and the Bergen County Board of Chosen Freeholders whose first elective race was a loss running for the Waldwick Borough Council
- Jack Hewson (1924–2012), professional basketball player who played for the Boston Celtics during the 1947–1948 season
- Charles Kinsey (1773–1849), Congressman
- Jerry Palmieri (born 1958), football strength and conditioning coach, most recently on Tom Coughlin's staff for the New York Giants
- Brunilda Ruiz (1936–2019), ballet dancer with the Joffrey Ballet
- Allison Smith (born 1969), actress

== Sources ==
- Municipal Incorporations of the State of New Jersey (according to Counties) prepared by the Division of Local Government, Department of the Treasury (New Jersey); December 1, 1958.
- Clayton, W. Woodford; and Nelson, William. History of Bergen and Passaic Counties, New Jersey, with Biographical Sketches of Many of its Pioneers and Prominent Men., Philadelphia: Everts and Peck, 1882.
- Harvey, Cornelius Burnham (ed.), Genealogical History of Hudson and Bergen Counties, New Jersey. New York: New Jersey Genealogical Publishing Co., 1900.
- Van Valen, James M. History of Bergen County, New Jersey. New York: New Jersey Publishing and Engraving Co., 1900.
- Westervelt, Frances A. (Frances Augusta), 1858–1942, History of Bergen County, New Jersey, 1630–1923, Lewis Historical Publishing Company, 1923.
