= Albert Smith House (Waldwick, New Jersey) =

Historic house in New Jersey, United States

- U.S. National Register of Historic Places
- New Jersey Register of Historic Places
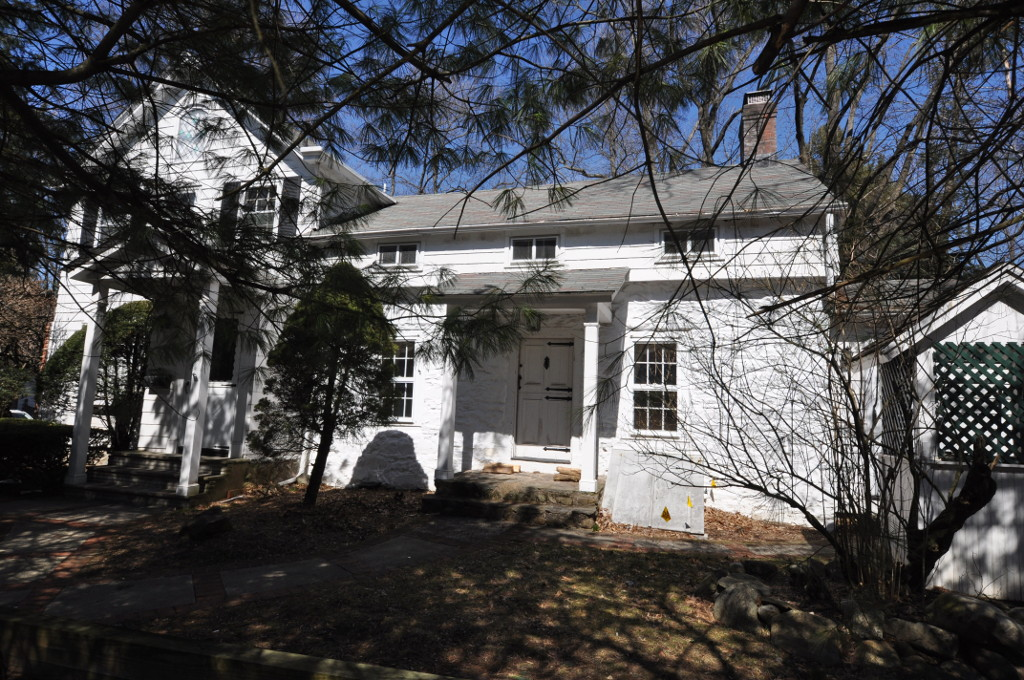

- Location within Bergen County, New Jersey Location within New Jersey Location within the United States
- Location: 289 Wycoff Avenue, Waldwick, New Jersey
- Coordinates: 41°1′17″N 74°6′19″W
- Area: 1.5 acres (0.61 ha)
- Built: 1750
- MPS: Stone Houses of Bergen County TR
- NRHP reference No.: 83004870
- NJRHP No.: 715

Significant dates
- Added to NRHP: January 10, 1983
- Designated NJRHP: October 3, 1980

The Albert Smith House in or near Waldwick, Bergen County, New Jersey, United States, was built in 1750. It was listed on the National Register of Historic Places in 1983. The property is listed in the National Register's database as being located in both Bergen County, New Jersey and Allegany County, New York, which must be an error as Allegany County is far away, bordering Pennsylvania not New Jersey.

== See also ==
- National Register of Historic Places listings in Bergen County, New Jersey
