= Waldwick High School =

High school in Bergen County, New Jersey, US

Location
- 155 Wyckoff Avenue; Waldwick, Bergen County, New Jersey 07463; United States; 41.010985°N 74.133066°W

Information
- Type: Public high school
- Established: 1963 / Renovated 2023
- School district: Waldwick Public School District
- NCES School ID: 341686000888
- Principal: Kevin Carroll
- Faculty: 46.6 FTEs
- Grades: 9-12
- Enrollment: 434 (as of 2024–25)
- Student to teacher ratio: 9.3:1
- Colors: Navy blue Columbia blue and white
- Athletics conference: North Jersey Interscholastic Conference
- Team name: Warriors
- Newspaper: The Echo
- Website: whs.waldwickschools.org

Waldwick High School is a four-year comprehensive public high school that serves students in ninth through twelfth grade from Waldwick, in Bergen County, in the U.S. state of New Jersey, operating as part of the Waldwick Public School District.

The school complex serves Waldwick students grades six though twelve; the district's middle school was constructed in the 1990s on the campus of the Waldwick High School building.

As of the 2024–25 school year, the school had an enrollment of 434 students and 46.6 classroom teachers (on an FTE basis), for a student–teacher ratio of 9.3:1. There were 7 students (1.6% of enrollment) eligible for free lunch and 1 (0.2% of students) eligible for reduced-cost lunch.

== History ==
Voters approved a referendum in June 1961 by a better than ten-to-one margin to provide for a $2.6 million bond covering the costs of construction. Until the high school opened, Waldwick students had been enrolled at Midland Park High School as part of a sending/receiving relationship that led to overcrowding at the Midland Park school. Through the late 1950s, students from Waldwick had attended Ramsey High School, which faced capacity issues, forcing the shift to Midland Park.

The school was designed to accommodate 1,500 students in grades eight through twelve and was completed in 1963. The school opened with students in grades nine and ten, as students who had already been enrolled at Midland Park High School in previous years completed their education there. The first class of students graduated from Waldwick High School in 1966. The "Kids, Kids, Kids" preschool program was established in the 1970s, in which high school juniors and seniors work with preschoolers three days each week as part of an elective program for students that is available for a fee to the public.

The school had been accredited by the Middle States Association of Colleges and Schools Commission on Elementary and Secondary Schools from 1969 until 2011, when the school's accreditation status was removed.

== Awards, recognition and rankings ==
The school was the 73rd-ranked public high school in New Jersey out of 339 schools statewide in New Jersey Monthly magazine's September 2014 cover story on the state's "Top Public High Schools", using a new ranking methodology. The school had been ranked 54th in the state of 328 schools in 2012, after being ranked 68th in 2010 out of 322 schools listed. The magazine ranked the school 93rd in 2008 out of 316 schools. The school was ranked 96th in the magazine's September 2006 issue, which surveyed 316 schools across the state. Schooldigger.com ranked the school 161st out of 381 public high schools statewide in its 2011 rankings (a decrease of 59 positions from the 2010 ranking) which were based on the combined percentage of students classified as proficient or above proficient on the mathematics (79.3%) and language arts literacy (95.9%) components of the High School Proficiency Assessment (HSPA).

== Extracurricular activities ==
The school offers a wide range of extracurricular activities that all students have a chance to join. Drama Club allows students to participate in different musicals and perform them in a series of three shows for one weekend in the spring. In March 2017, Waldwick High School students performed in The Addams Family. Because the school is connected to the Waldwick Middle School, students have a chance to help younger students improve their acting and musical skills.

The school has a science, technology, engineering and mathematics (STEM) team where students visit other high schools and compete in these topics.

The school also has many ways for the students to get involved. There are a total of 22+ clubs to get involved with overseeing a wide variety of interests. Some have been around for many years, such as Photography Club, and some have been recently made, such as the Mind Over Matter club, which was created last school year, 2021-2022.

=== Athletics ===
The Waldwick High School Warriors participate in the North Jersey Interscholastic Conference, which is comprised of small-enrollment schools in Bergen, Hudson, Morris and Passaic counties, and was established following a reorganization of sports leagues in Northern New Jersey by the New Jersey State Interscholastic Athletic Association (NJSIAA). Prior to the realignment that took effect in the fall of 2010, Waldwick was a member of the smaller Bergen-Passaic Scholastic League (BPSL). With 308 students in grades 10-12, the school was classified by the NJSIAA for the 2019–20 school year as Group I for most athletic competition purposes, which included schools with an enrollment of 75 to 476 students in that grade range. The school's co-op football team with Midland Park High School was classified by the NJSIAA as Group II North for football for 2024–2026, which included schools with 484 to 683 students.

Interscholastic athletic programs offered include: Varsity Cross Country, Varsity Golf, Junior Varsity Golf, Varsity Football, Junior Varsity Football, Freshman Football, Boys Varsity Soccer, Boys Junior Varsity Soccer, Boys Freshman Soccer, Girls Varsity Soccer, Girls Junior Varsity Soccer, Girls Freshman Soccer, Girls Varsity Volleyball, Girls Junior Varsity Volleyball, Girls Freshman Volleyball, Girls Varsity Tennis, Varsity Wrestling, Boys Varsity Basketball, Boys Junior Varsity Basketball, Boys Freshman Basketball, Girls Varsity Basketball, Girls Junior Varsity Basketball, Girls Freshman Basketball, Boys & Girls Winter Track, Varsity Baseball, Junior Varsity Baseball, Freshman Baseball, Varsity Softball, Junior Varsity Softball, Girls Lacrosse, Boys Varsity Lacrosse, Boys Junior Varsity Lacrosse, Freshman Softball, Boys Varsity Track, Girls Varsity Track and Boys Varsity Tennis.

The school participates as the host school / lead agency in a joint cooperative football (expiring in June 2028) and boys wrestling team with Midland Park High School, participates in an ice hockey team together with Hawthorne High School, with Lakeland Regional High School as host (June 2028) and in boys / girls swimming with New Milford High School as host (June 2028).

The football team finished the 1988 season with a 9-2 record after winning the NJSIAA North I Group I state sectional title with a 26-7 win against Cresskill High School in the championship game.

The boys' wrestling team won the North I Group I state sectional championship in 1988 and 1992.

The 1995 boys' soccer team finished the season with a 24-0 record after winning the Group I state title that year, defeating Arthur P. Schalick High School in the championship game and winning the Bergen County Tournament by a score of 2-1 against Ridgewood High School in the tournament final. The team has won multiple North I, Group I state sectional championships, including in the 2006 fall season with a 1–0 victory over local rival Midland Park High School in the tournament final. In more recent history, the boys soccer time has been to the Group 1 state championship 3 times in the past 5 years, taking home the trophy twice in both 2024 and 2021. (Runner up in 2022)

The boys' basketball team won the North I, Group I state sectional championship in 2000 with a 62–49 win against Henry P. Becton Regional High School.

== Administration ==
The principal is Kevin Carroll. His administration team includes two assistant principals.

== Notable alumni ==
- Enzo Amore (born 1986), former professional wrestler in the WWE
- Dave Fiore (born 1974), offensive lineman for the San Francisco 49ers and the Washington Redskins
- Joe Harasymiak (born 1986, class of 2004), head coach for the UMass Minutemen football team
