= Ho-Ho-Kus station =

NJ Transit rail station

Ho-Ho-Kus
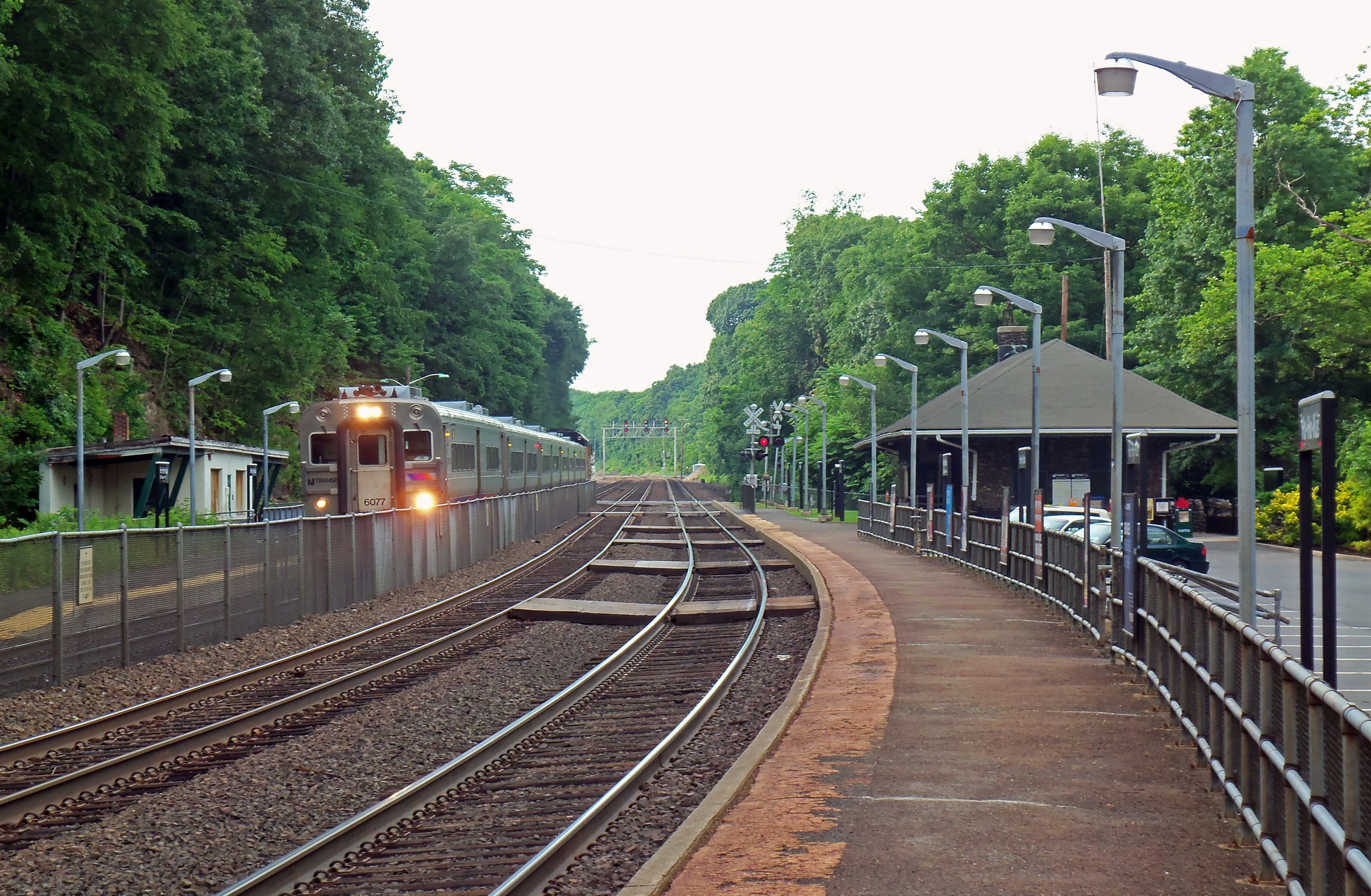
- A train arriving in Ho-Ho-Kus on its way towards Hoboken Terminal in 2011. The station depot is visible on the right side.

General information
- Location: 1st Street at Brookside Avenue, Ho-Ho-Kus, New Jersey
- Coordinates: 40.9974°N 74.1133°W
- Owner: NJ Transit
- Platforms: 2 side platforms
- Tracks: 3

Construction
- Parking: Yes
- Cycle facilities: Yes
- Accessible: No

Other information
- Station code: 2317 (Erie Railroad)
- Fare zone: 10

History
- Opened: October 19, 1848
- Rebuilt: 1860, 1886, 1908

Passengers
- 2025: 308 (average weekday)
- Rank: 84 of 153

Services
Preceding station	NJ Transit	Following station
Waldwick toward Suffern	Main Line	Ridgewood toward Hoboken
Waldwick toward Suffern	Bergen County Line	Ridgewood toward Hoboken
Former services
Preceding station	Erie Railroad	Following station
Waldwick toward Chicago	Main Line	Ridgewood toward Jersey City
Location

Ho-Ho-Kus is a NJ Transit station served by the Bergen County Line and Main Line. The station is located in Ho-Ho-Kus, New Jersey, at Brookside Avenue and 1st Street, across the bridge on Warren Avenue from Franklin Turnpike.

== History ==
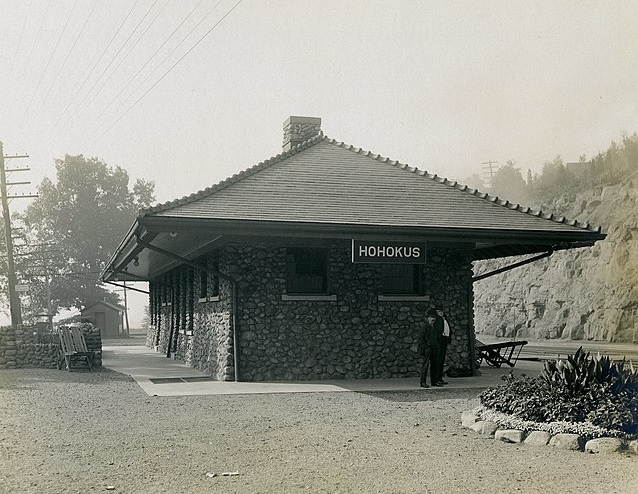
Hohokus station construction made use of river stones, seen here shortly after its opening in 1908.

The station's current westbound structure was constructed in 1908 with river stones and a tile roof. This replaced facilities built in 1886 that burned. The first station, built in 1860, had also burned down several years after construction. The eastbound side was an irregularly shaped waiting shed built in 1909.

== Station layout ==
This station has three tracks, the outer two of which are served by low-level side platforms.
