= Waldwick station =

NJ Transit rail station

Waldwick
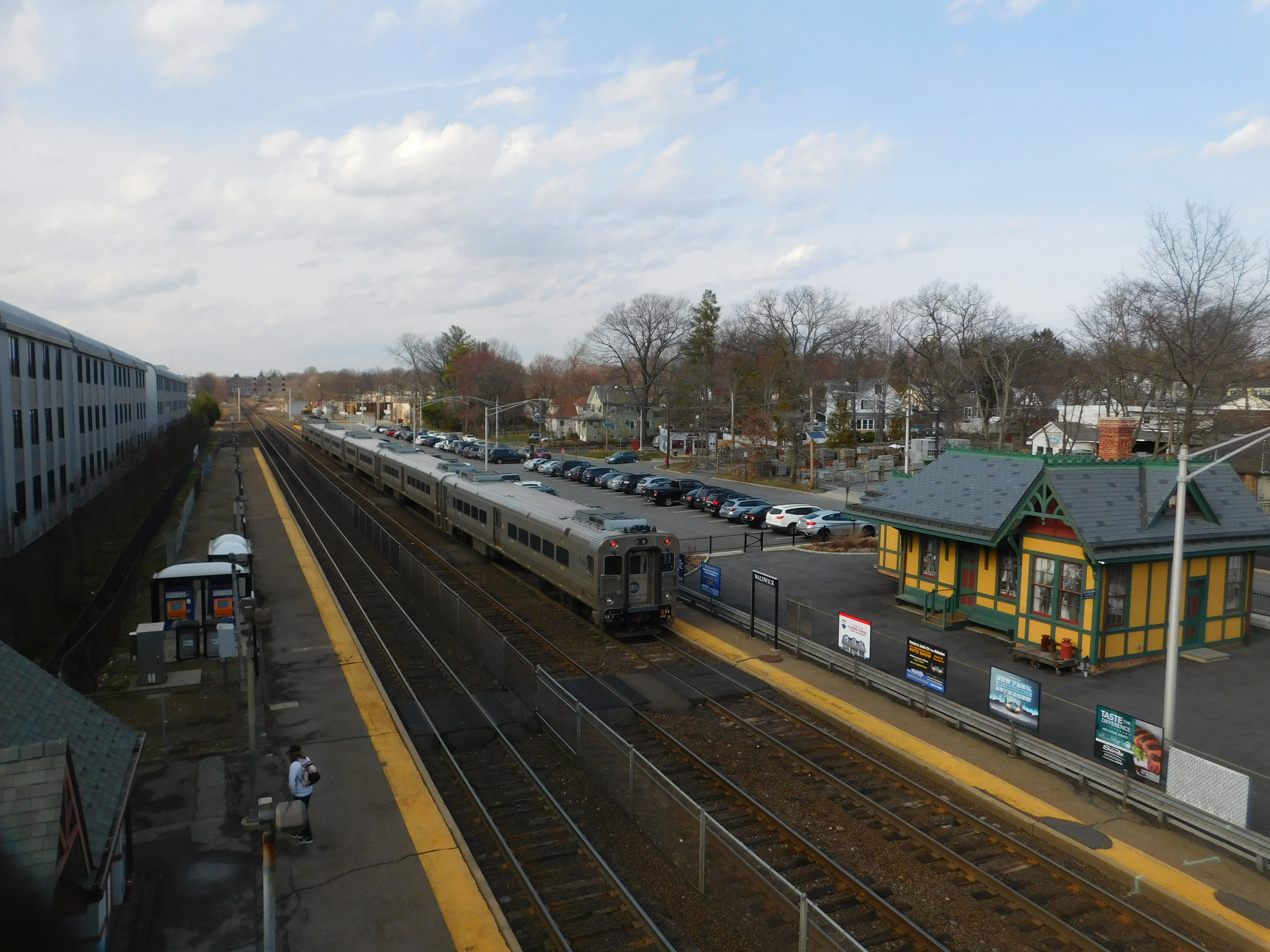
- Waldwick station from pedestrian bridge at south end. Original depot at right with a transit-oriented development on the left.

General information
- Location: West Prospect Street at Hewson Avenue, Waldwick, New Jersey
- Coordinates: 41.0122°N 74.1230°W
- Owner: New Jersey Transit
- Platforms: 2 side platforms
- Tracks: 3

Construction
- Parking: Yes
- Accessible: No

Other information
- Station code: 2319 (Erie Railroad)
- Fare zone: 10

History
- Opened: 1886

Passengers
- 2025: 313 (average weekday)
- Rank: 82 of 153

Services
Preceding station	NJ Transit	Following station
Allendale toward Suffern	Main Line	Ho-Ho-Kus toward Hoboken
Allendale weekdays toward Suffern	Bergen County Line	Ho-Ho-Kus toward Hoboken
Former services
Preceding station	Erie Railroad	Following station
Allendale toward Chicago	Main Line	Ho-Ho-Kus toward Jersey City
- Waldwick Railroad Station
- U.S. National Register of Historic Places
- New Jersey Register of Historic Places
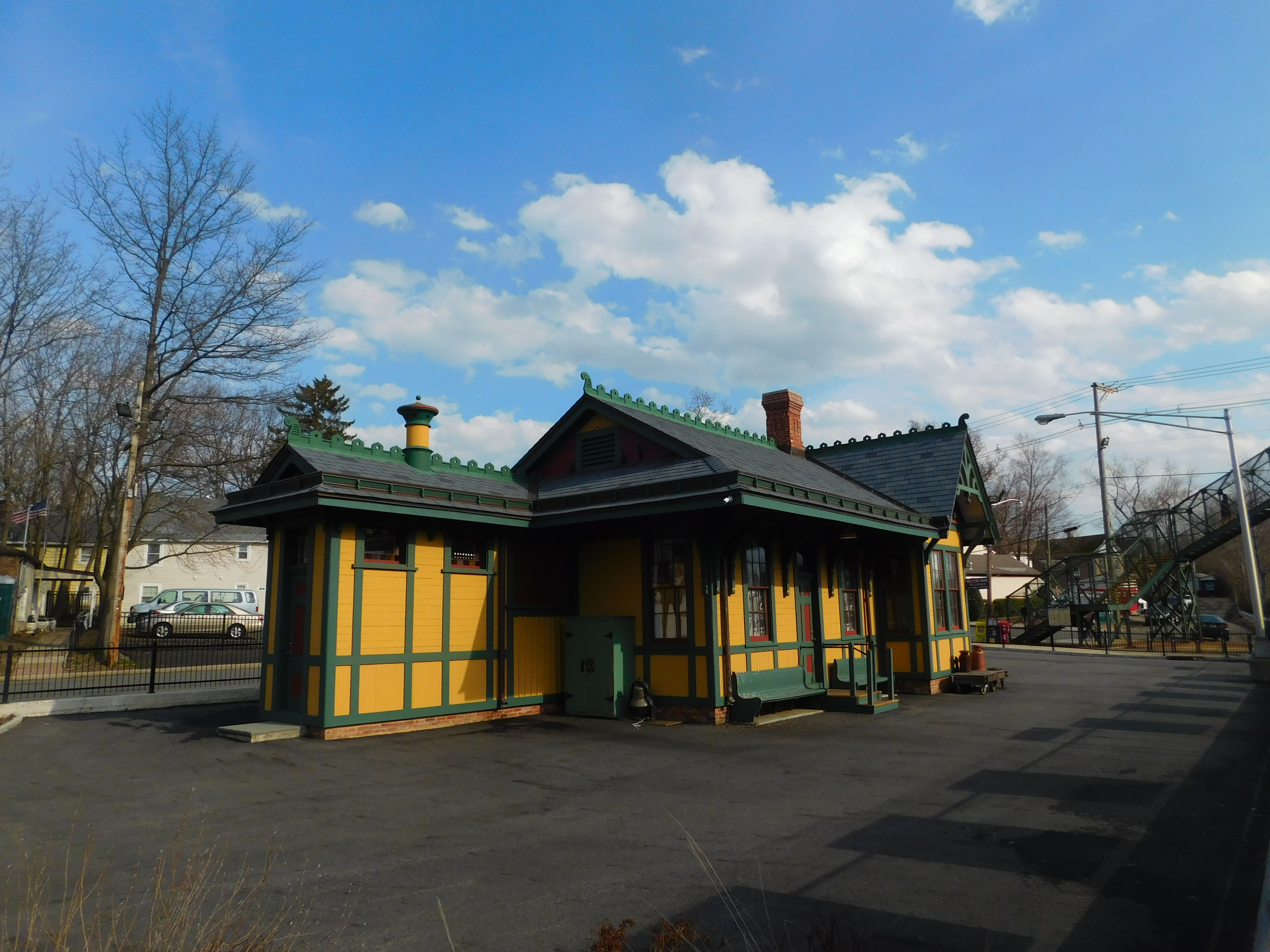
- The Waldwick station depot, post-restoration, in April 2018.
- Location: Hewson Avenue and Prospect Street, Waldwick, New Jersey
- Coordinates: 41°0′44″N 74°7′26″W
- Area: 0.2 acres (0.08 ha)
- Built: 1886
- NRHP reference No.: 78001742
- NJRHP No.: 716

Significant dates
- Added to NRHP: February 23, 1978
- Designated NJRHP: August 27, 1977
Location

Waldwick is a commuter rail station operated by New Jersey Transit in the borough of Waldwick, Bergen County, New Jersey, United States located at the intersection of West Prospect Street and Hewson Avenue. It is served by the Main Line and the Bergen County Line; some trains of both originate and terminate at the station. The station has three tracks, the outer two of which are served by low-level side platforms, which are connected by a pedestrian bridge at their southern ends. The multiple-track yard Waldwick Yard is located at the north end of the station. The historic Erie Railroad Signal Tower is between them.

This station did not open along with the rest of the Paterson and Ramapo Railroad on October 19, 1848. The Erie Railroad, which took over that railroad, established a stop at Waldwick c. 1886 and a wooden station depot was built on the east side of the tracks. The historic original station house has been listed in the state and federal registers of historic places since 1978 and is part of the Operating Passenger Railroad Stations Thematic Resource. The Waldwick Community Alliance has leased the building for 25 years until 2034. After years of being in disrepair, it was restored and now houses the Waldwick Museum of Local History.

== History ==
=== Establishment ===
The Paterson and Ramapo Railroad started service on October 19, 1848, though no station was built in the area of Hohokus Township that constitutes modern-day Waldwick. Stops were established at Allendale and the eponymous Hohokus for passenger and freight from Jersey City and vice versa.

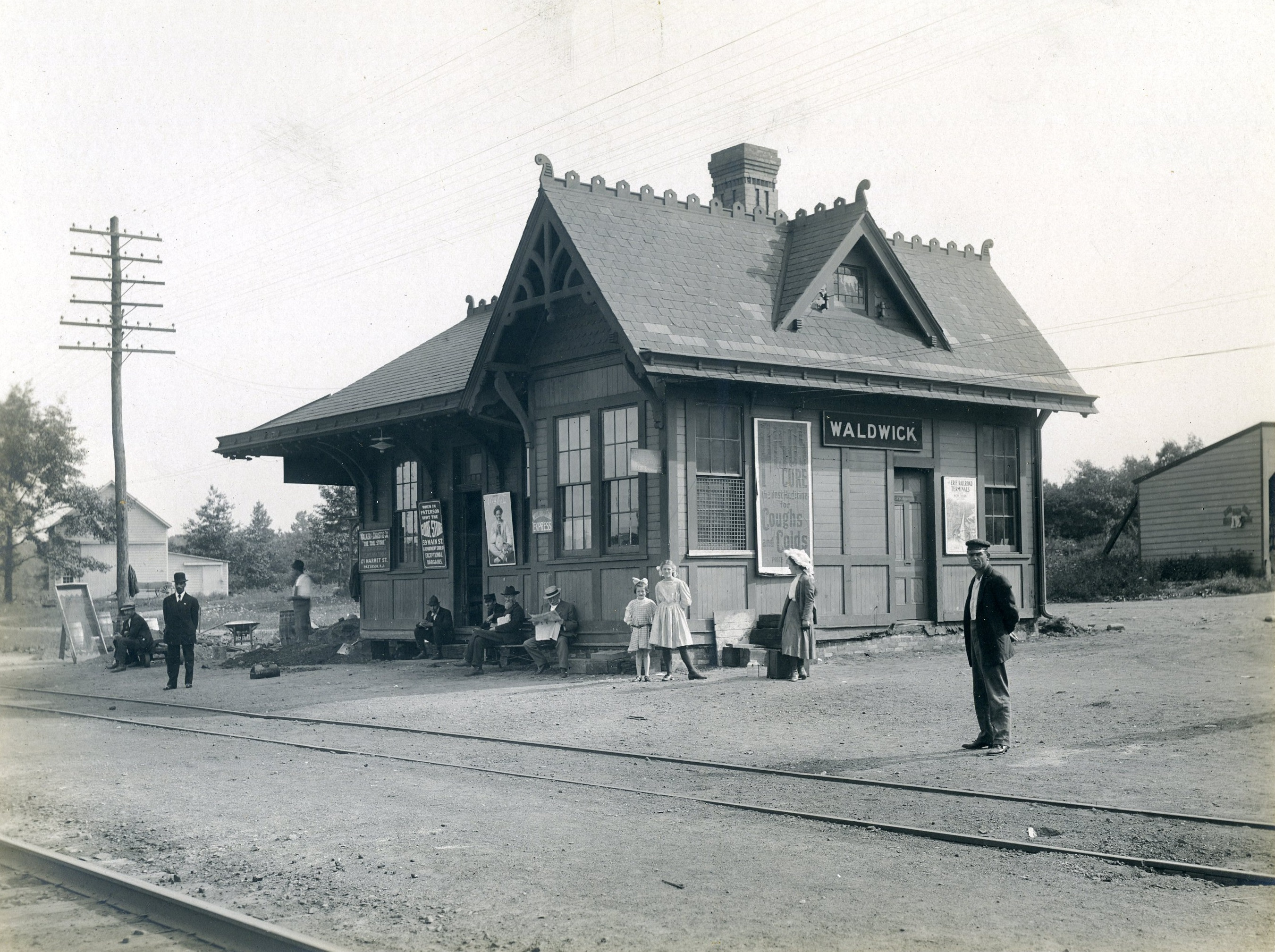
Waldwick station, c. 1907–1912

The establishment of Orvil Township, New Jersey (named after local resident Orvil Victor) in the late 1880s helped pushed the interest of the Erie Railroad to build a station between Allendale and Hohokus. Farmers requested that the railroad provide trains for them to transport their products more quickly. Peter Bogert, a local farmer, donated some of his land along the tracks Orvil Township and residents offered to pay for a new station in 1886. Victor was chair of a committee to decide what the name of the new stop would be, which decided on the name "Waldwick" after originally choosing "Waldweck".

The architect Augustus Mordecai of the Erie Railroad was chosen to design the station. Mordecai designed a depot of mixed architectures, combining Stick style and Queen Anne styles. The depots were Stick with the Queen Anne exception being corbeled chimneys, square window borders and shingled gable ends. Mordecai would use this style at other stops, including Suffern, New York and Palisades Park. The depot at Waldwick was a one-and-a-half-story structure with five different rooms. This includes a 24-by-17.5-foot (7.3 m × 5.3 m) waiting room for passengers, the baggage room and 10.5-by-25.2-foot (3.2 m × 7.7 m) ticket office, a storage room and a coal facility that combined for 18 by 6.5 feet (5.5 m × 2.0 m) of the structure. The waiting room and ticket office contained cast-iron stoves for heating. The outside was batten wood with stucco.

With the establishment of the station, the railroad agreed that a rail yard would be completed by 1887. However, local investors from both New York City and Passaic County, New Jersey invested in a 200-acre (81 ha) piece of land next to the tracks at Waldwick in 1889. With the property abutting the tracks, 5 acres (2.0 ha) would be offered to the Erie Railroad to build a yard, replacing a previous proposal at Ridgewood. This would be the terminal for all local trains, in effect replacing the yard in Paterson, necessitating the construction of a new station in the city. With the new yard, more express trains would stop at Paterson with Ridgewood and Waldwick having upgraded facilities. With the yard and increased trains, speculators would be selling out cut out pieces of purchased lands for country homes.

=== 1887 accident ===
On July 21, 1887, a deadly train accident occurred at the curve just south of Waldwick station. With local laborers putting ballast on the railroad, a delayed express train from Chicago entered the area an hour behind schedule. Around 7:15 a.m., the train reached the workers, who were unaware the train was running late. The train crashed into the laborers, killing at least 11 workers instantaneously. The train came to a stop and began to reverse. The crew and passengers looked at the wounded and deceased bodies all over the track. There were also several laborers running around in a disoriented manner. Several bodies were mangled, with dismembered parts all over the track right-of-way. 15 bodies were counted by passengers as laying on the track.

After 15 minutes, the train continued on its way east to Hohokus. After the accident, the deceased workers were taken to Hohokus while the injured were taken to St. Joseph's Hospital in Paterson. Blame was immediately placed on the foreman for the ballast crew for not getting his crew out of danger of the oncoming express train. Later investigation stated that there 16 men in the crew that was on the tracks at the time of the accident. The engineer noted to the press at Jersey City that he blew his whistle to alarm the herded ballast workers and attempted to stop the train from hitting them. However, the engineer admitted that there was little he could do to stop the incident.

=== Proposals for replacement ===
==== 1958 ====
In August 1958, the borough of Waldwick appealed to the Erie Railroad to demolish their station depot and replace it with a modern structure on the west side of the tracks. The station, considered a local eyesore by Mayor Robert Denver, would be replaced by extra parking for commuters. The railroad stated in a letter that they would not rebuild the station depot in Waldwick, but was open to using some of its land for a parking area, involving a lease of the property to the borough.

At a meeting of the Erie Railroad with delegates from the Waldwick Planning and Zoning Boards, along with the Taxpayer's Association on October 11, 1958, Denver proposed construction of a new station at Waldwick. As part of this, the 1887 depot, freight house, and two of the four tracks would be removed from the station. J.R. Ebert, the superintendent for the railroad, stated that he would ask his superiors about the borough's proposal. He also wrote to the borough would get a high priority if they agreed to it. If upper management agreed, the new depot would be built for freight trains, the railroad would lease some of the property for municipal parking.

At a meeting with the Waldwick Planning Board on October 14, George Sondergaard told attendees that the railroad would reconsider their August decision. Sondergaard stated that the railroad would consider building a new depot similar to the one at Ho-Ho-Kus if Waldwick borough was to demolish the current depot. Sondergaard added that the railroad was actively considering tearing down the freight house in Waldwick and two of its tracks, along with a railroad spur to a local lumberyard.

Denver, wanting a new station, pushed local societies to push for the relocation or removal of the original depot to no success. Also, the rest of the Waldwick Borough Council for 1958 seemed disinterested in his proposal. Denver stated that he would press the 1959 Council to be more interested in his proposal and that either the railroad or the borough would have to demolish the depot.

==== 1970s proposal ====
A new proposal for replacing the Erie depot in Waldwick came in 1973. The borough and the New Jersey Department of Transportation began working on plans to replace the station for a new structure and a new parking lot. As part of this proposal, the depot would be razed and replaced with a 150 parking space lot on the Hewson Avenue side of the tracks. A new station depot would be built on the inbound side of the tracks to replace the original structure. This new depot, built of brick material, would contain a 30-by-20-foot (9.1 m × 6.1 m) waiting room, a ticket office and a new restroom. The depot would also have a picture window and aluminum doors looking towards the tracks. A new 400 by 10 feet (121.9 m × 3.0 m) platform would be constructed for the new structure, replacing a flood-prone existing platform. The new parking lot on Hewson Avenue would have concrete curbs and guide rail to protect commuter vehicles.

The Department of Transportation requested that the borough turn Hewson Avenue into a one-way street in order to help traffic flow for the new parking lot. The Waldwick Borough Council approved such a design change. Robert Ryan, a member of the Council, stated that the Department of Transportation budgeted $500,000 (1973 USD) for the station replacement. Ryan noted that the state requested a letter of intention before it would take any actions, including putting out bids for such a job.

Eugene DelGuidice, the ticket agent at Waldwick station, noted that the new station would make things easier for commuters, who had to cross the tracks to get the tickets in the morning then cross back to catch their trains. Councilman Ted Bell also noted that the gravel parking lot would be extended and replaced with new pavement, resulting in commuters not parking on side streets. This new parking lot would be maintained by the borough and avea small fee to cover maintenance and expenses. The new station would be finished by the autumn of 1974.

Vocal opposition to demolition of the depot was almost immediate. By early October 1973, local residents immediately stated their interest to the local press that they would push for making the Waldwick station depot a historic site.

However, legal issues resulted in the project being delayed into the autumn of 1975. As part of the project, land for the new station and ticket office would need land the Erie Lackawanna Railroad leased to a local lumber yard. The lack of ability to acquire the necessary land resulted in a much smaller depot having to be designed. The smaller depot would no longer require a ticket agent. In October 1975, local press noted that the station's parking lot would be replaced in a range of 30–45 days with the depot demolished and replaced by a heated shelter in six to nine months. The borough of Waldwick also set aside $33,000 for the new parking meters and to light the new parking lot. Mayor Ralph Cook stated that the borough had no interest in preserving the depot unless a local group was willing to move the structure to another location.

The project continued to be delayed into 1976 and by January 1977, the Department of Transportation set a deadline to have the old station depot moved or it would be razed. Terry Karschner, the historian curator for the New Jersey Department of Environmental Protection, stated that he was trying to find someone who wanted the depot. The Jaycees branch in Waldwick noted that they should move the station. Borough residents were split on the project, some hailing for a new modern parking lot and depot, some concerned about losing a piece of the borough's history. Eugene DelGuidice noted that the depot was still clean, maintained and almost everything was original.

The Department of Transportation set the deadline for January 31 to have a proposal to move the depot in hand. The organization had a handshake agreement with Conrail over the proposal and Mayor John Cassetta noted that the borough would have to sign an agreement for maintenance purposes of the new parking lot. However, the Department of Transportation stated that construction of the lot would likely not begin until March 1977 until agreements and bids were certified. Local groups had been unable to that point find no money to move the station to a new location, if one was provided. The Waldwick Borough Council continue to express no interest in saving the depot, despite Cassetta's efforts to talk to the concerned citizens.

At a meeting on February 1, 1977, the Waldwick Borough Council received a letter from the Department of Transportation demanding the station be moved, noting it interfered with a plan to raise the surface level of the ground in the area and installing new surface drainage pipe. At that meeting, James Cleary, offered to move the depot at his cost to a property he owned on Franklin Turnpike (CR 507). Cleary, a local real estate agent, would pay for the project and connect it to an office building he owned. Frank McKenna, a councilman, noted that the range for moving it would cost $50,000–$100,000 based on estimates and that wires and limbs would need to be removed for the move. Cassetta stated that the borough would also get a grant for $75,000 for the improved drainage and with higher levels of traffic expected, the improvements would be necessary.

==== Preservation ====
On February 16, a group of 30 local residents agreed unanimously to find a way to preserve the station depot. As part of the vote, a new local nonprofit society would be formed and chaired by Kay Williams of Waldwick Place. While they obtained an extension to March 15 from the Department of Transportation, the members stated that they would face a battle to come up with a plan in under a month with no financing. Williams stated that the best solution would be to raise money and use the model in Mahwah, turning the depot into a museum. Most of the people at the meeting disagreed with Cleary's proposal to move the station to Franklin Turnpike.

Members Jeanne Robinson and John Gallacher noted that they found four places at the current station where the depot could be moved to in a copy of the plans from the Department of Transportation. Gallacher stated that he would like to know if the station really needed the 175 parking spaces proposed as part of the lot.

At a work session on March 1, Williams pled to the Borough Council to give them a shot at preserving the depot, having raised $1,000 in a couple weeks for the rescue of the depot. She stated that the preservation group would not threaten the construction of the new parking lot and that the Waldwick Historical Society would take control of the depot, maintaining it without use of taxpayer funds. Williams also stated that she received a letter from Robert Innocenzi of the Department of Transportation stating that they would arrange a meeting with Conrail and the Waldwick Borough Council before March 15 so they could make arrangements. Cassetta asked the Borough Clerk William Longson to call Innocenzi on March 2, adding that the deadline may need an extension.

Conrail stated on March 10 that they would be interested in leasing the depot to the Waldwick Historical Society, depending on the price. Conrail wanted a fair market price for their lease, which led to concerns that it might be too high for the Historical Society to afford. Gallacher stated that the decisions made by Conrail scared the Society and the Borough Council. Cassetta backed up Gallacher's concerns, but Davis Deane of Conrail stated that they had a federal obligation to operate on a profit and the depot would be an issue to that motive. After arguments from Gallacher and Williams, Deane agreed to send a lease proposal to higher officials and tell Cassetta about the proposed cost. Deane also noted that he wanted to get the Department of Transportation's desire to start construction kept in mind for any proposal.

Cassetta reported Conrail's proposal on March 21. As part of granting a lease for the station depot, it could not be designated a historic site because it would prevent demolition of the structure. This new lease would be for one year at a rate of $600. On top of the rent, the Waldwick Historical Society would have to pay taxes to the state of New Jersey of $482 annually and provide liability insurance for personal injury and property damage insurance.

In April 1977, Kay Williams noted that efforts had begun to get Waldwick station on the National Register of Historic Places and the New Jersey Register of Historic Places. The New Jersey State Historical Sites Division sent a letter to Conrail that they would have until May 6, 1977 to challenge the nomination and a copy was sent to the borough. At the same time, the members of the Waldwick Historical Society and Borough Council objected to the lease Conrail proposed in late March officially through a letter by their counsel. Both parties protested Conrail's inclusion of a clause that could terminate the lease with 30 days notice. Williams also stated that the Waldwick Historical Society had found an old deed that the depot would return to the Victor family or its heirs if it were to no longer be used for railroad purposes.

Governor of New Jersey Brendan Byrne signed a new transit bill on June 30, 1977 that included $475,000 for the long delayed project at Waldwick station, having the platforms repaired, a new shelter built and the parking lot expanded. Cassetta told the press that Department of Transportation was negotiating with Conrail to move parking on the north side of the station. As part of the negotiations, the Department of Transportation would lease all the property from Conrail except for the station depot, in order to ensure preservation. Conrail came into an agreement in late July 1977 for the construction of the new parking lot occur around the station depot. Gallacher stated that the Waldwick Historical Society expected a designation of being a historic place within two weeks of a meeting on July 27.

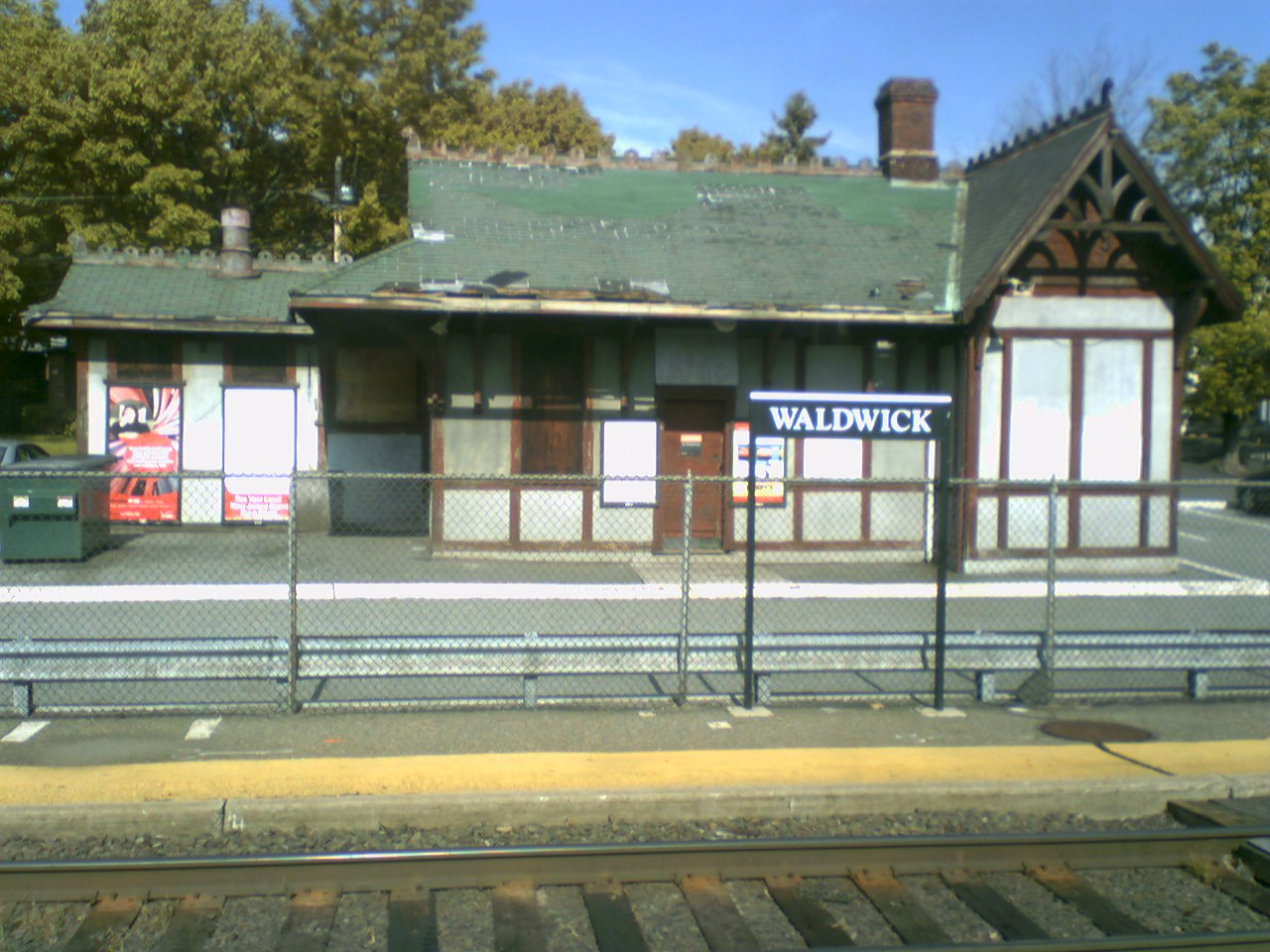
Waldwick station in June 2007, before restoration efforts

In early September 1977, the Waldwick station depot gained approval from the Office of Historic Preservation to list it on the New Jersey Register of Historic Places. However, notice came in late March 1978 that the depot was added to the National Register of Historic Places in a letter to Conrail. At that time, Williams announced that the construction of the long-delayed parking lot would begin April 24, 1978 and be finished by May 20.

In April 1986, NJ Transit eliminated the last workers to use the Waldwick station depot for any purpose. Ten engineers who were assigned to Waldwick Yard for their work would have their base station moved to Hoboken Terminal.

=== Restoration and community development ===
With the station in disrepair in 2005, a new community group named the Waldwick Community Alliance offered to NJ Transit to take part in its Community Revitalization Plan, involving all business owners in the municipality. This would include maintaining and updating their properties. However, NJ Transit declined the request.

On August 13, 2008, NJ Transit announced that the 1887 station depot would be leased to the Waldwick Community Alliance for $1 per year through 2033. As part of the restoration effort, NJ Transit would take out six parking spaces and relocate them in the lot, as well as adjust the entry and exit locations to the parking lot. The entire leased space would be 8,545 square feet (793.9 m^{2}) and all restoration work would be paid for by Waldwick Community Alliance.

The Alliance planned to start restoration work in the Spring of 2010. However, the plans were interrupted in a paperwork requirement to the New Jersey Department of Community Affairs and State Historic Preservation Office to send all their plans so they could approve it. The Department of Community Affairs required plans be sent to focus on the internal utilities of the station, which would cost upwards of $30,000 if they hired HQW Architects in Newton to put the entire list together. The approvals already cost the Alliance $17,000 to get NJ Transit on board in 2009. It was also stated that the roof and sill plate were to be replaced and the building would be raised from the ground level.

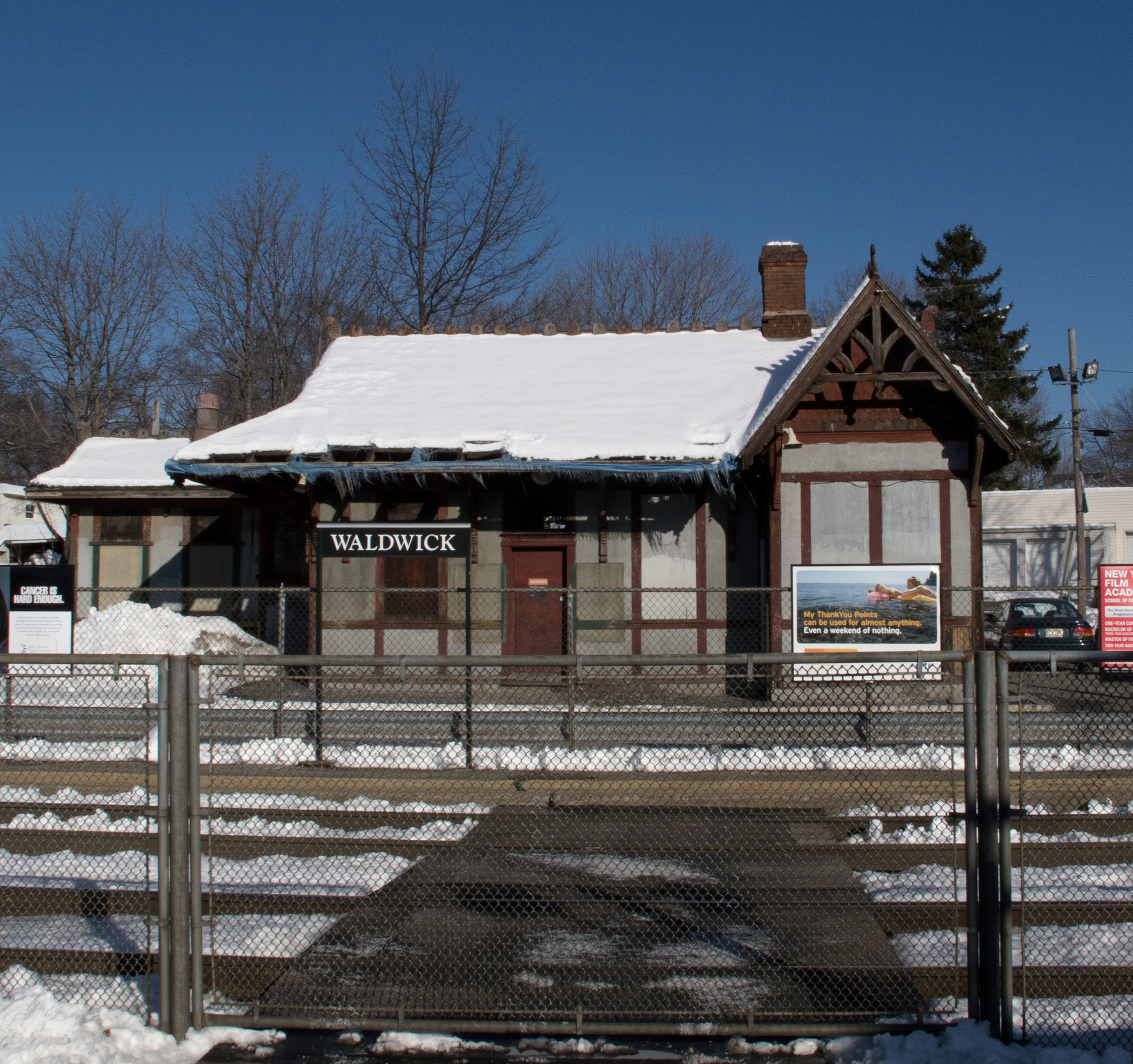
Waldwick station in 2011

After heavy fundraising efforts and acquiring grants, construction on the new roof and sill plate began October 2011. As part of the grants, all construction required using modern versions of 1887 materials and crafting. The roof work was done by October 2013, when project funding shifted to the next phase. However, due to problems with the contractor who did the first phase of work, the Waldwick Community Alliance required finding a new contractor to work on the project. On October 4, 2013, the community group acquired bids from several engineering firms to start the next part and reduced it to two possibilities. However, there were concerns about the bids being higher than expected. As part of the second phase, the station would have all its windows restored, doors replaced, painting and fresh utilities. Also, the station would receive new drainage, fencing, stairs and a ramp compliant with the Americans with Disabilities Act of 1990. However, due to the high bids, the Waldwick Community Alliance stated that they would have to consider reducing the scope of the second phase if costs could not come down.

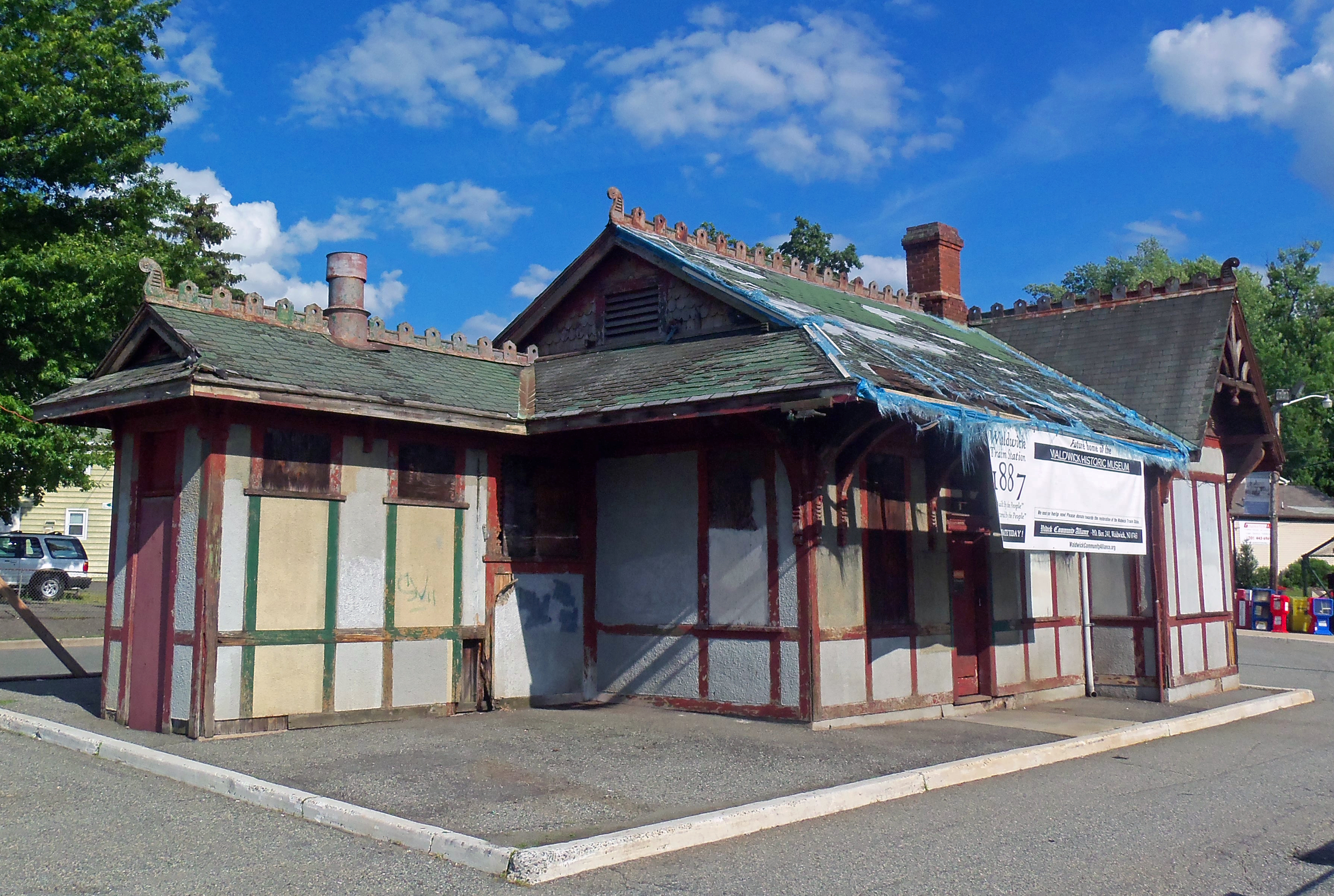
Waldwick station undergoing restoration in July 2011

On May 22, 2016, the borough of Waldwick marked the completion of the restoration project. A ribbon cutting ceremony and musical performances were done before speakers began discussing the long project. Doug Cowie, the Vice President of the Waldwick Community Alliance cited Kay Williams' actions in 1977 and 1978 for saving the depot for them to restore after Conrail's demolition attempt. Williams' daughter, Joani Williams Wortmann also spoke about her mother's actions and thanked the Alliance for continuing her efforts.

In June 2015, the borough of Waldwick approved a new housing development named Waldwick Station on the site of the former DeMartini Coal and Lumber Company, which abutted the tracks on the west side on West Prospect Street. The new project would provide $479,000 in new tax revenue for the municipality. It would include 1,676 square feet (155.7 m^{2}) of retail space next to the station for residents and commuters alike. There would be 111 apartments in all, broken up to into studio, one-bedroom and two bedroom apartments. 10 percent of these apartments would meet affordable housing requirements. The lower level of the structure would serve as a parking garage.

Construction began in July 2016 with the destruction of the former lumber yard. After swift construction due to a mild winter, Russo Development and Terminal Construction, operators of the new development, suggested it would begin leasing in the autumn of 2017. The new development opened on November 22, 2017.

== Station layout and services ==
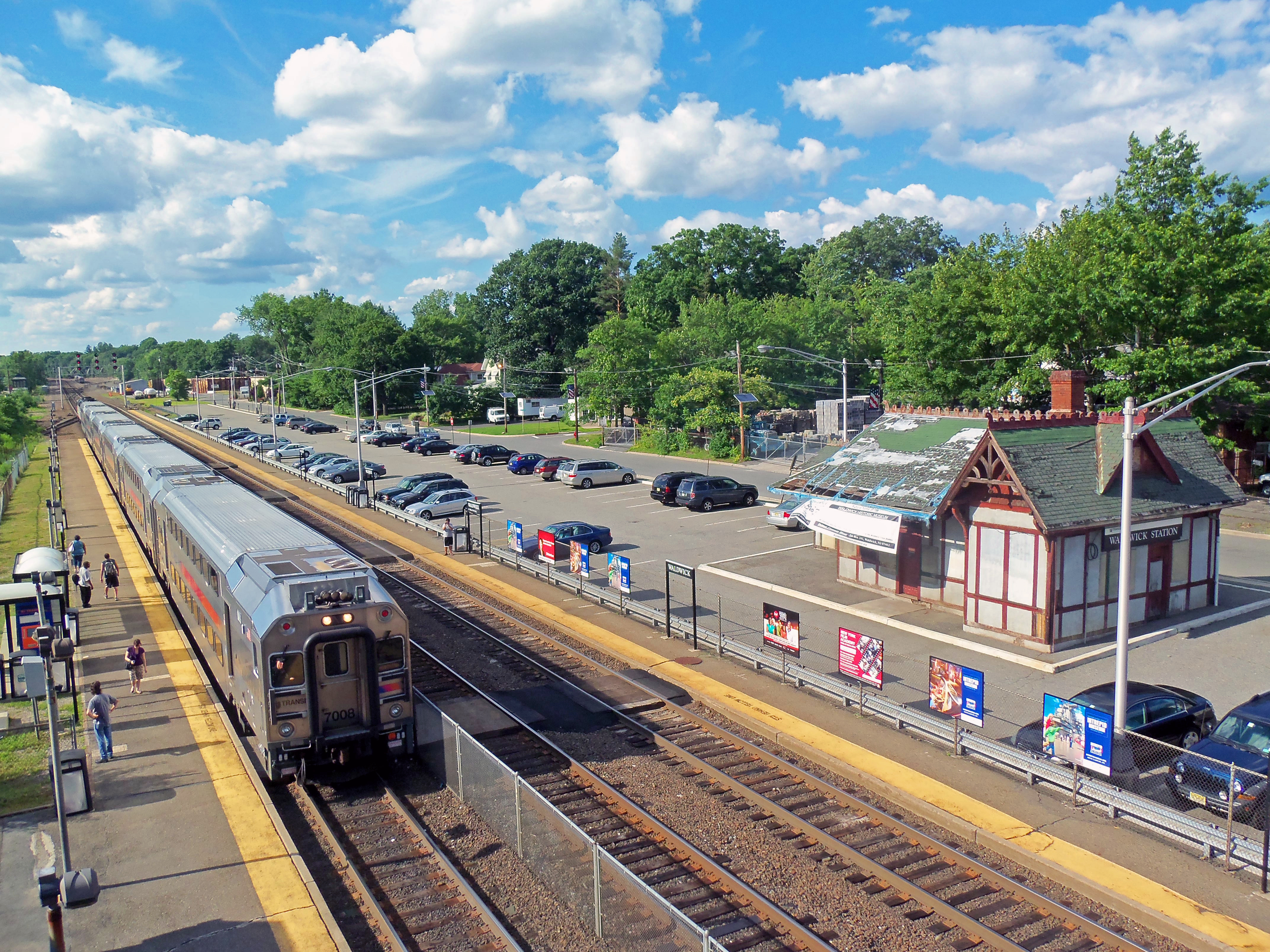
A train departs Waldwick station in July 2011 as seen from the pedestrian bridge

Waldwick station contains three tracks, containing two low-level side platforms. West Prospect Street, cut by the tracks, connects the station via a steel-frame pedestrian bridge. The station and the bridge are both not accessible for handicapped persons. The station depot is on the east side of the bridge while a passenger shelter on the west side. Waldwick station has three separate parking areas, but only one full lot. The main lot, located at the junction of West Prospect Street and Hewson Avenue, contains 153 regular spaces and two handicap accessible spaces. The parking lot is owned by NJ Transit but operated by the borough of Waldwick. During the week, the lot is permit only, but free at nights and weekends. The second set of spaces is street parking on Hewson Avenue, containing 28 spaces and daily parking during the week. The last 14 spaces are on Maple Avenue and Wagner Street adjacent to the Hoboken-bound tracks, requiring a daily parking fee during the week and free on weekends.

Waldwick, like its neighboring stations at Ho-Ho-Kus, Allendale and Ramsey, has no connecting bus services available at the station. The station is located in fare zone 10 with Ho-Ho-Kus.

== See also ==
- Erie Railroad Signal Tower, Waldwick Yard
- List of New Jersey Transit stations
- Operating Passenger Railroad Stations Thematic Resource (New Jersey)
- National Register of Historic Places listings in Bergen County, New Jersey

== Bibliography ==
- Trautwine, John C. (1900). "Journal of the Association of Engineering Societies - Volume XXIV, January to June, 1900". Journal of the Association of Engineering Societies. XXIV. The Board of Managers of the Association of Engineering Societies.
