= North Jersey Rapid Transit Company =

The North Jersey Rapid Transit Company was an Interurban railway that operated between Suffern, New York and Paterson, New Jersey. It was headquartered in Ho-Ho-Kus. Most of the right-of-way is now a PSE&G utility corridor.

== History ==
The line was constructed between 1908 and 1910 from East Paterson to Ho-Ho-Kus, and it was extended to Suffern in 1911.

On July 21, 1911, cars 12 and 20 collided head-on due to faulty signals, killing trackman John Frotaillo, motorman William Hutchinson on his last day of work, and superintendent Francis J Pilgrim who had convinced him to work one more day.

In 1925, a competing bus line opened, and in 1926, unable to pay its power bills, the NJRT was taken over by the Public Service Corporation and extended to the P.S. terminal in downtown Paterson. The final trains ran on December 31, 1928, and it was demolished the following year, with the rails being sold to Russia.

== Route ==
The NJRT ran largely parallel to the Erie Railroad, which is now the Bergen County Line.

Mileage	Station	Crossing (flag stop)	Switch
15.2	Suffern	Main Street- Lafayette Avenue	
14.9		Oliver Street-Hospital	
14.6		State Line, N.Y.-N.J.	
14.2		Fox Lane	
14.1		Christie Avenue	
13.7	Mahwah	Miller Road	
13.3		Cragmere-Franklin Turnpike	
13.1		Airmont Road	
12.7			No.8
12.2		Spring Street	
11.5		Island Road	
11.3		Chestnut Street	
11.0	Ramsey	Main Street	
10.0			No.7
9.5		Crescent Avenue	
9.0	Allendale	Allendale Avenue-Maple Street	
8.7			Erie R.R. interchange
8.4		Chestnut Street	
7.6	Waldwick	Prospect Street	No.6
7.5		Franklin Turnpike	
6.6		Saddle River Road	
6.1	Ho-Ho-Kus	Franklin Turnpike, NJRT HQ	No.5
5.6		Harrison Avenue	
5.4		Meadowbrook Avenue	
5.2		Linwood Avenue	
5.0		Overbrook Road	
4.8	Ridgewood	Ridgewood Avenue	No.4
4.5		Spring Avenue	
4.1		Grove Street	
3.8		Prospect Street	No.3
3.5		Ackerman Avenue	
3.1	Glen Rock	Hamilton Avenue	No.2
2.5		Harristown Road	
2.0			No.1
1.2	Fairlawn	Fairlawn Avenue	
1.0		Berdan Avenue	
0.6		Morlot Avenue	
0.3		Willow Street	
0.0	East Paterson	Broadway-River Road	Hudson River Line
2.5	Paterson	Main Street	P.S. Terminal

== Rolling stock ==
The NJRT ran a fleet of eight cars built by Jewett Car Company, numbered with even numbers from 10 to 24. In addition, number 8 was the Work Car. These ran on 600 volts direct current, and a bank of incandescent lamps lowered the voltage to 100 to operate a third-rail contact for the block signals and crossing gates.
