= Glen Rock–Main Line station =

NJ Transit rail station

Glen Rock Main Line
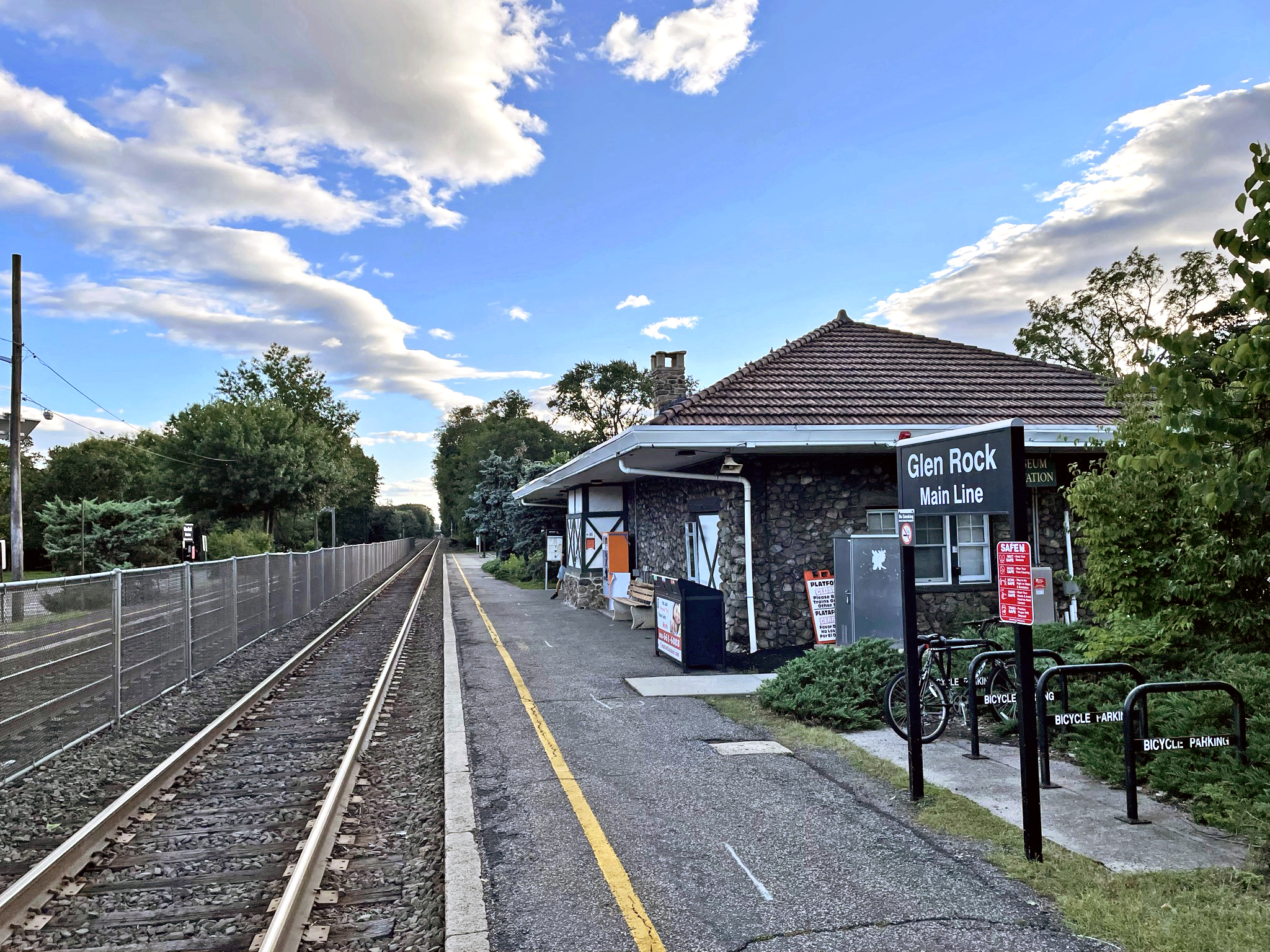
- Glen Rock–Main Line station facing southbound

General information
- Location: Rock Road at Main Street, Glen Rock, Bergen County, New Jersey 07452
- Coordinates: 40.9623°N 74.1337°W
- Owner: New Jersey Transit
- Platforms: 2 side platforms
- Tracks: 2

Construction
- Parking: 190 spaces

Other information
- Station code: 2311 (Erie Railroad)
- Fare zone: 8

History
- Opened: October 19, 1848
- Rebuilt: November 1905
- Former names: Rock Road

Passengers
- 2025: 227 (average weekday)
- Rank: 97 of 153

Services
Preceding station	NJ Transit	Following station
Ridgewood toward Suffern	Main Line	Hawthorne toward Hoboken
Former services
Preceding station	Erie Railroad	Following station
Ridgewood Terminus	Main Line local stops	Ferndale toward Jersey City
Location

Glen Rock–Main Line is an active commuter railroad station in the borough of Glen Rock, Bergen County, New Jersey. One of two stations in the borough, Glen Rock's name disambiguates it from the Glen Rock–Boro Hall station on NJ Transit's Bergen County Line. Located at the Main Street junction on Rock Road (County Route 134), this station serves trains of NJ Transit's Main Line between Hoboken Terminal and Suffern station. Glen Rock–Main Line station consists of two asphalt low-level side platforms and a standing station depot built by the Erie Railroad on the inbound platform.

== History ==
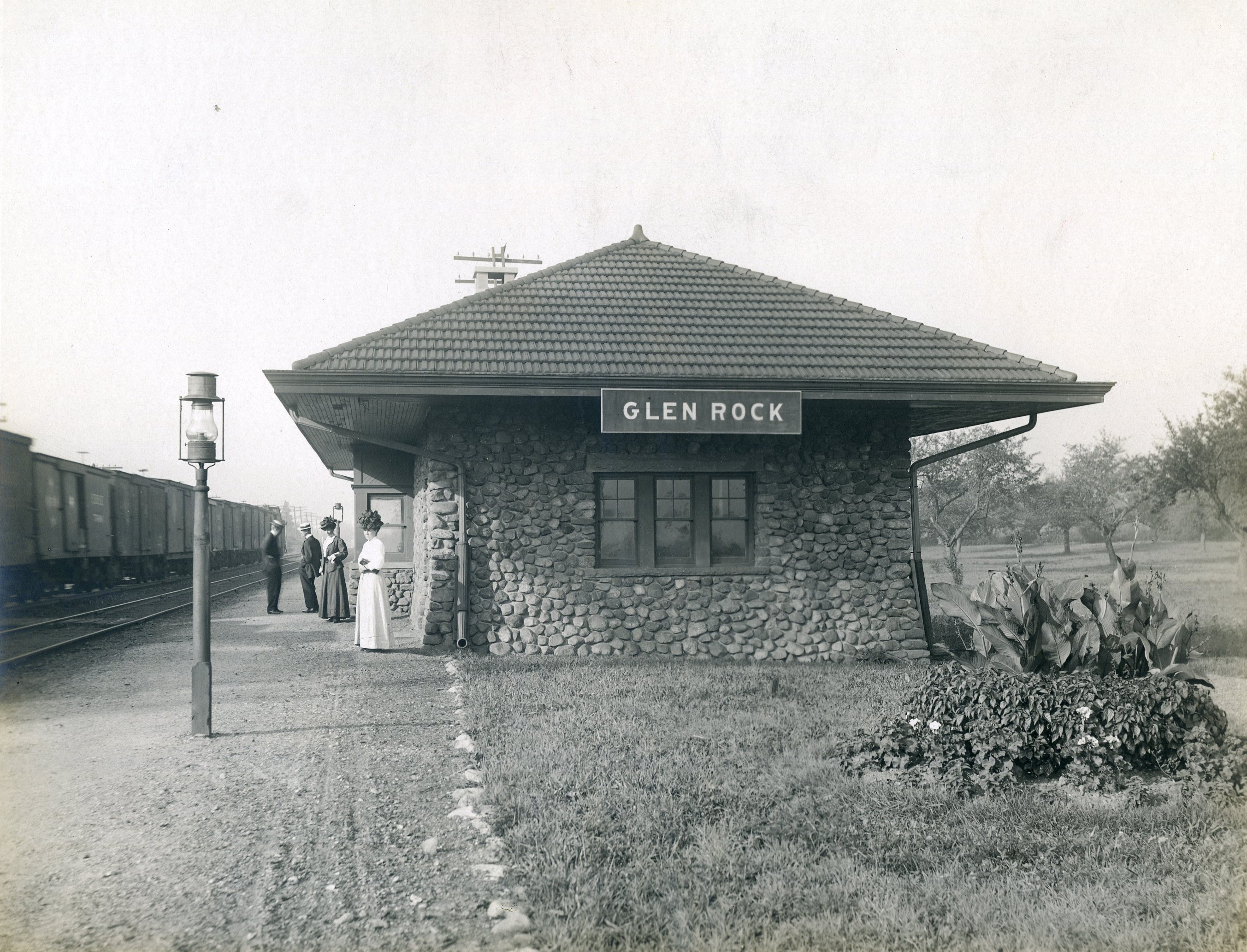
Glen Rock–Main Line station, c. 1907–1912

Service at Glen Rock–Main Line began on October 19, 1848, with the opening of the Paterson and Ramapo Railroad, which connected the Erie Railroad at Suffern to the Paterson and Hudson River Railroad in Paterson. At that time, the station was known as Rock Road. The Erie Railroad, who took control of the Paterson and Ramapo, also opened a second station in Glen Rock, known as Ferndale in 1894.

Located at Ferndale Avenue south of the Rock Road station, a railroad terminal was built at Ferndale and served as the yard for the Newark Branch of the Erie in 1902. The Erie discontinued that in 1903 when they finished the yard in Waldwick. The current station depot was finished in November 1905.

== Station layout ==
The station has two tracks, each with a low-level side platform. The station is not compliant with the Americans with Disabilities Act of 1990.
