= Plauderville station =

NJ Transit rail station

Plauderville
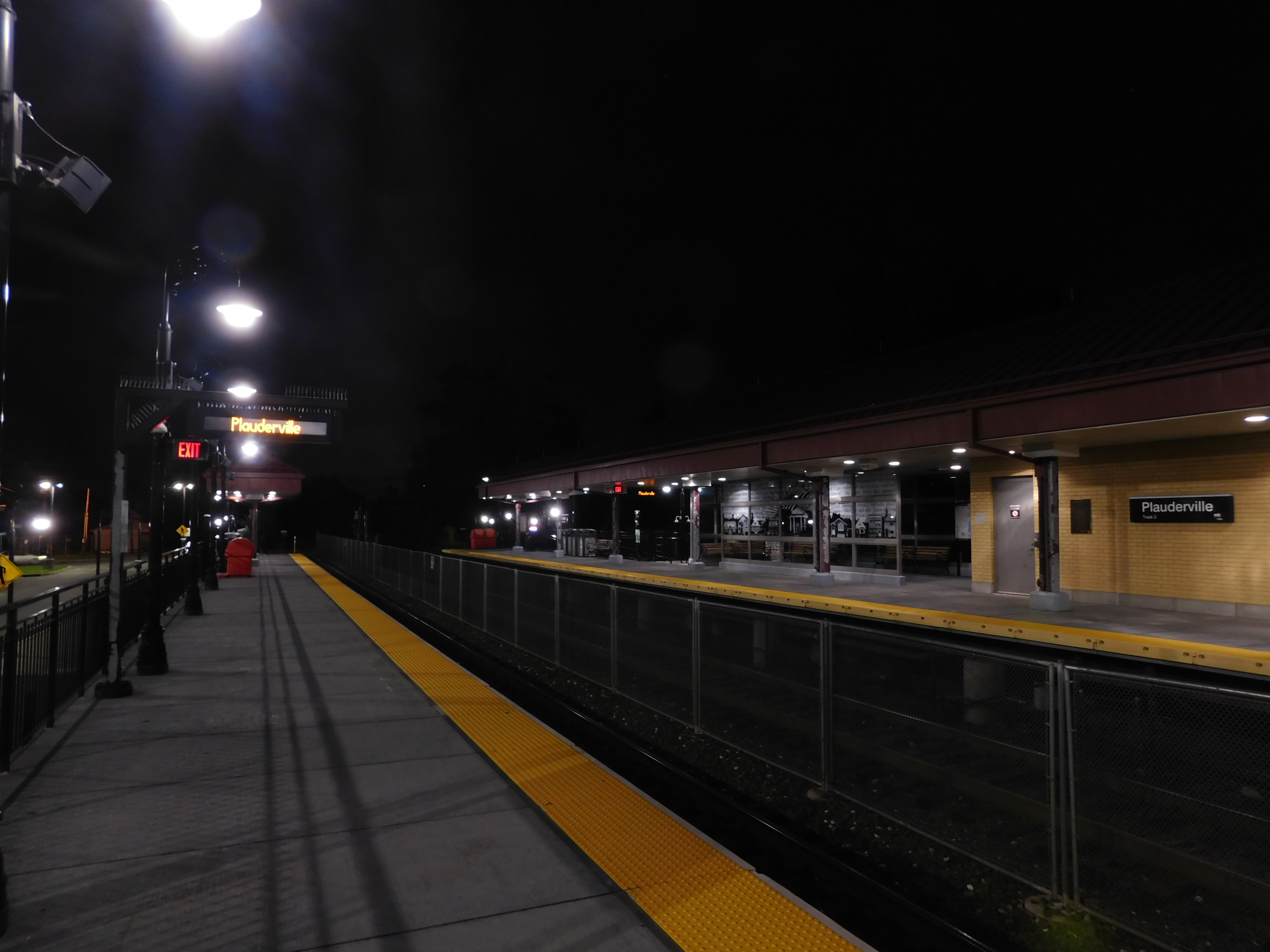
- Plauderville station in August 2023.

General information
- Location: Midland Avenue and Outwater Lane, Garfield, New Jersey 07026
- Coordinates: 40.8870°N 74.1025°W
- Owner: New Jersey Transit
- Platforms: 2 side platforms
- Tracks: 2
- Connections: NJT Bus: 160 and 758

Construction
- Accessible: Yes

Other information
- Station code: 2119 (Erie Railroad)
- Fare zone: 5

History
- Rebuilt: December 1911; August 20, 2009–October 10, 2011
- Electrified: Not electrified

Passengers
- 2025: 400 (average weekday)
- Rank: 71 of 153

Services
Preceding station	NJ Transit	Following station
Broadway toward Suffern	Bergen County Line	Garfield toward Hoboken
Former services
Preceding station	Erie Railroad	Following station
Fair Lawn toward Ridgewood	Bergen County Railroad	Garfield toward Jersey City
Location

Plauderville is a NJ Transit train station located in Garfield, New Jersey, United States, served by the Bergen County Line. The station is in the north side of the city on Midland Avenue between Plauderville Avenue and Outwater Lane. The station is a full-service station as of April 2012, and has high-level platforms making the station accessible for people with disabilities.

Starting in 2009, with money from the American Recovery and Reinvestment Act, New Jersey Transit received funds to construct high-level platforms at Plauderville on the south side of Midland Avenue. Trains used the low-level platform until October 10, 2011, when trains were moved to the completed high-level platforms. The new high-level platform station was constructed by Anselmi & DeCicco, Inc. of Maplewood, New Jersey.

== History ==
In 1995, NJ Transit presented announced plans for a new railroad station on Midland Avenue and Outwater Lane which is now the Plauderville station. In 2002, a woman died by suicide, laying down on the tracks less than half a mile from the station.

=== High-level platforms ===
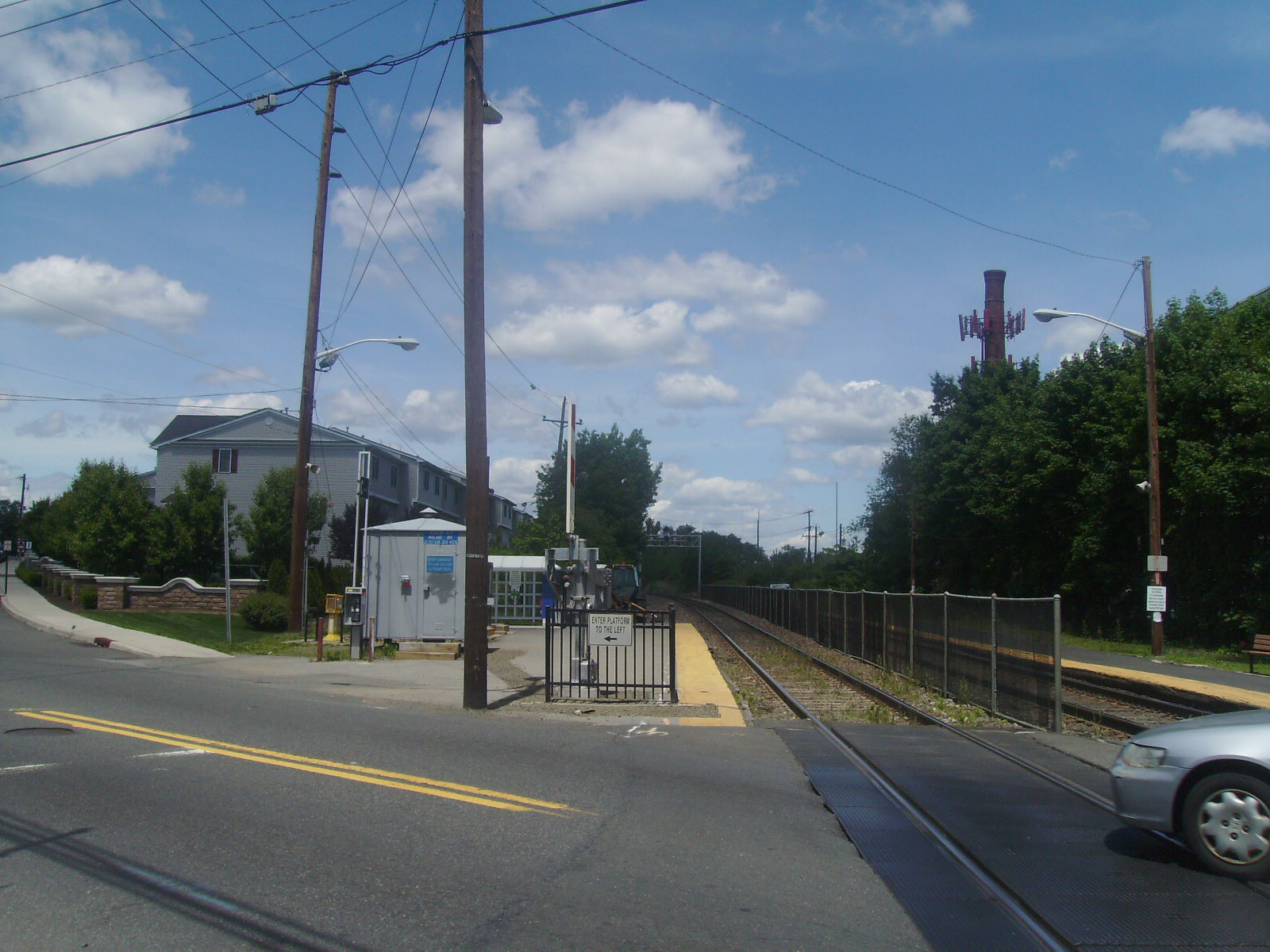
The former station platform in Plauderville, in use until October 10, 2011

As part of the passage of the American Recovery and Reinvestment Act, New Jersey Transit received funding for new high-level platforms at Plauderville station. These new high-level platforms would build a new station for persons with disabilities, under the Americans with Disabilities Act of 1990. The cost of the project was $16 million (2009 USD). On August 12, 2009, a $7.9 million contract for the construction was given to Anselmi and DeCicco Inc. with improvements including new 450-foot (140 m) long side platforms that also have glass paneling for history of Garfield. The city manager of Garfield, Tom Duch, said the station may include a statue of the late president James Garfield, who the city is named after.

Prior to the opening of the new structure on October 11, 2011, Plauderville's platforms were located slightly uptrack from where they are now, straddling the border between Garfield and its neighbor Saddle Brook. There was a shelter on the platform for trains headed to Hoboken Terminal along with the station's ticket vending machines, and the platforms were low-level and offered zero accessibility for people with disabilities.

The first revenue train to receive commuters using the new high-level platforms (on October 10, 2011) was the 5:43 am Hoboken-bound train (originating in Port Jervis). Use of the low-level platform on the northern side of Midland Avenue was immediately discontinued.

Prior to the completion of the reconstruction at Plauderville, Garfield was not fully served by NJ Transit. Although Plauderville was utilized by a fair number of commuters in the area, judging by the station featuring parking for over 250 cars, it and its Passaic Street counterpart saw service only during peak travel times; trains departing for Hoboken Terminal would begin bypassing both stations in the early afternoon, despite outbound service being available all day. After the new station at Plauderville was completed, NJ Transit added more Hoboken-bound service in the evening and at night.

On September 21, 2012, the station's crossing with Outwater Lane received a new safety system for people trying to cross tracks. Part of a pilot program, new electronic signs were installed that state "Danger, Another Train Coming" on all four portions of the crossing. Audio recordings repeat the same message. The system cost $83,000.

== Station layout ==
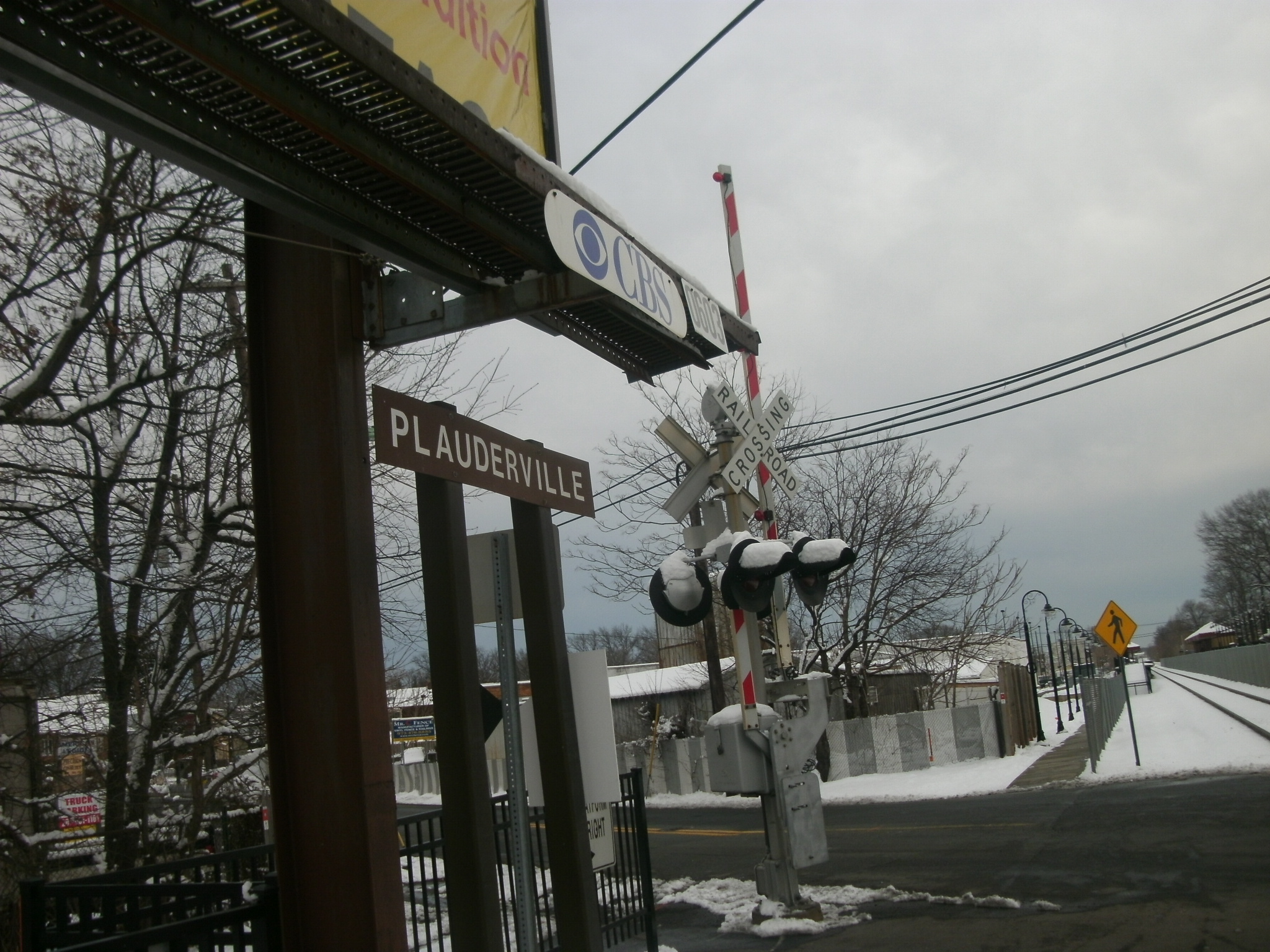
Old form of New Jersey Transit rail station signage is visible on the former Plauderville station's outbound platform

The station has two tracks, each with a high-level side platform.

The current Plauderville station is located on a plot of land that spans from Outwater Lane at Henrietta Street to Midland Avenue at Plauderville Avenue in Garfield. The station has 259 parking spaces divided among three different free parking lots owned by New Jersey Transit. The first and largest lot is next to the station's Suffern-bound platform and contains 224 parking spaces, seven of which are accessible for disabled (limited mobility) persons. The second is located on Midland Avenue and Hartman Street with 21 extra spaces, but these are not accessible for people with disabilities. The final parking lot is located on Outwater Lane at the Henrietta Road junction, containing 14 non-disabled accessible parking spaces and situated behind the Hoboken-bound platform.

Pedestrian street access is available on both Outwater Lane and Midland Avenue, with the platform ending near the grade crossing where the original platform was. Plauderville's one ticket machine is on the Hoboken-bound side of the tracks, placed in a weather-protected seating area with a glass painting from a local artist serving as its window, and also has an overhang that spans more of the platform than the small overhang on the outbound side.

== See also ==
- Ridgewood station (New Jersey)
