= Garfield station (disambiguation) =

- Garfield railway station, a regional railway station in Victoria, Australia
- Garfield station (NJ Transit), an NJ Transit station in Garfield, New Jersey, United States.
- Garfield station (CTA Green Line), a Chicago "L" station in Washington Park, Chicago, Illinois, United States
- Garfield station (CTA Red Line), a Chicago "L" station in Fuller Park, Chicago, Illinois, United States
- Garfield Avenue station, a light rail station in Jersey City, New Jersey, United States
