= Rutherford station =

NJ Transit rail station

Rutherford
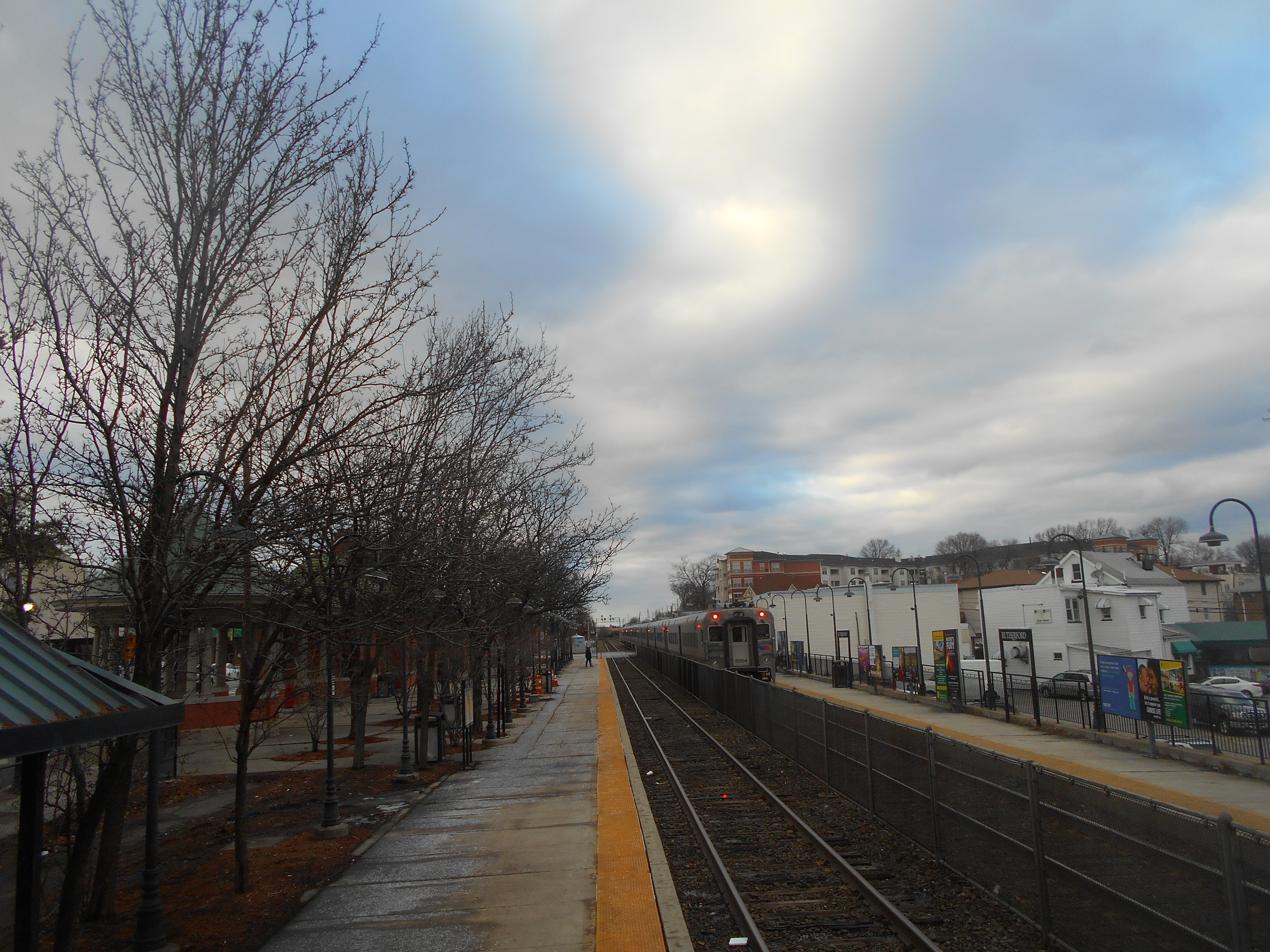
- Rutherford station from the Hoboken Terminal-bound mini high-level platform in January 2015.

General information
- Location: Park Avenue, Orient Way, Union Avenue, and Erie Avenue; Rutherford, New Jersey
- Owner: New Jersey Transit
- Platforms: 2 side platforms
- Tracks: 2
- Connections: NJT Bus: 76 and 190

Construction
- Parking: 136 spaces
- Cycle facilities: Yes; bicycle racks
- Accessible: yes

Other information
- Station code: 2105 (Erie Railroad)
- Fare zone: 3

History
- Opened: December 4, 1833
- Rebuilt: c. 1862, 1897

Passengers
- 2025: 671 (average weekday)
- Rank: 43 of 153

Services
| Preceding station | NJ Transit | Following station |
|---|---|---|
| Wesmont toward Suffern | Bergen County Line | Secaucus Junction toward Hoboken |
Former services
| Preceding station | Erie Railroad | Following station |
|---|---|---|
| Passaic toward Chicago | Main Line | Jersey City Terminus |
| Carlton Hill toward Ridgewood | Main Line local stops | Jersey City Terminus |
| Garfield toward Ridgewood | Bergen County Railroad | Jersey City Terminus |
- Rutherford Station
- U.S. National Register of Historic Places
- New Jersey Register of Historic Places
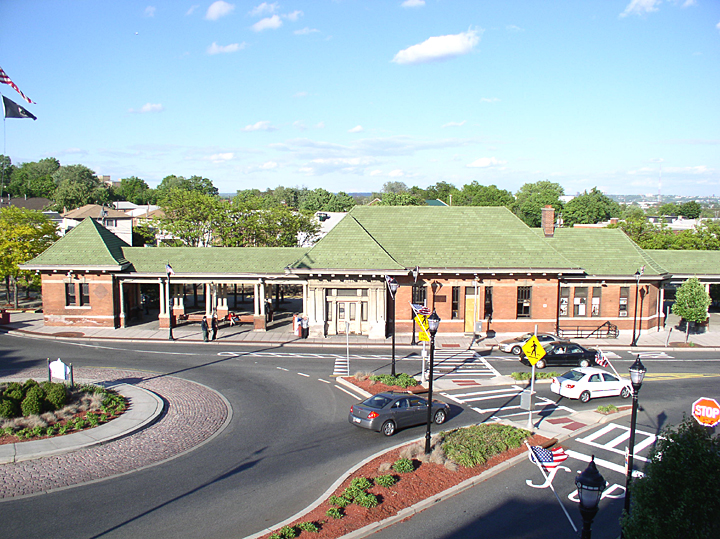
- Rutherford Station building taken from Station Square in Rutherford.
- Location: Station Square; Rutherford, New Jersey, USA
- Coordinates: 40°49′42″N 74°6′6″W
- Area: 0.5 acres (0.2 ha)
- Built: 1898
- Architect: Charles W. Buchholz
- Architectural style: Renaissance, Queen Anne
- MPS: Operating Passenger Railroad Stations TR
- NRHP reference No.: 84002584
- NJRHP No.: 667

Significant dates
- Added to NRHP: June 22, 1984
- Designated NJRHP: March 17, 1984
Location

Rutherford station is an active commuter railroad station in the boroughs of Rutherford and East Rutherford, Bergen County, New Jersey. Due to its location, the inbound platform is within Rutherford limits (along East Erie Avenue and Station Square), while the outbound platform is in East Rutherford (at Park and Union Avenues). Rutherford station services trains of NJ Transit's Bergen County Line from Suffern, New York or Waldwick, New Jersey to Hoboken Terminal in Hoboken, New Jersey. Some trains continue north to Port Jervis, New York via Metro-North Railroad's Port Jervis Line. Rutherford station consists of two low-level side platforms with two small high-level platforms at the south end.

Railroad service began with the extension of the Paterson and Hudson River Railroad through Union Township in 1833 from Passaic in Acquackanonk Township to Boiling Springs. The station and service opened on December 4, 1833 between Paterson and Boiling Springs. The station depot was replaced on three different occasions, once in 1852, once in 1862 and once in 1897 with the current station depot, built by the Erie Railroad. The station would be renamed Rutherford–East Rutherford. NJ Transit had Rutherford station added to the National Register of Historic Places in June 1984 as part of the Operating Passenger Railroad Stations Thematic Resource.

== History ==
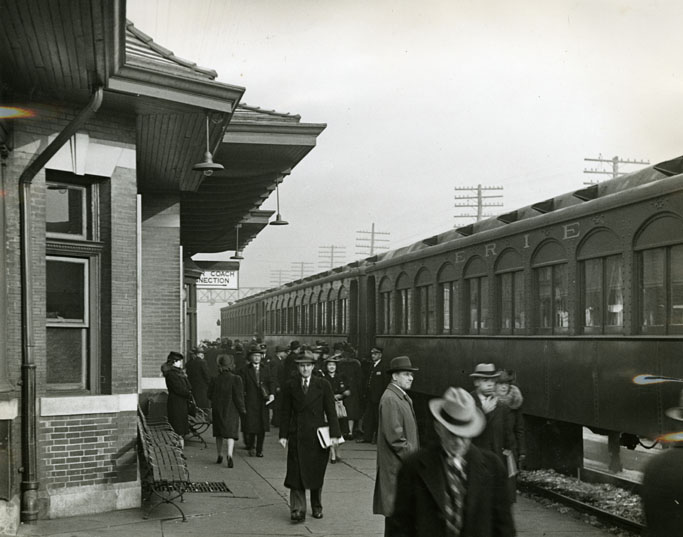
Erie Railroad passengers at Rutherford station, circa 1940

The Paterson and Hudson River Railroad was constructed through Union Township in 1833 (still mostly farmland at this point), and a station was constructed adjacent to the "Boiling Springs" (actually cold, but so named due to its turbulent flow). The service on the railroad line was initially passenger coaches pulled by horses, with the driver having a seat in the coach. The railroad soon switched to locomotive-hauled, purchasing two locomotives built in Baltimore, Maryland. The introduction of the locomotive service helped spur building construction and development in the area around Boiling Springs. The increased demand led the railroad to build a new station and ticket office as they bought land in the area to speculate on future development. The Erie Railroad which acquired the P&HR constructed a depot that was triangular in design made out of brick. The station depot was replaced in 1862. This structure in turn was replaced by the current construction of 1897. Around this time, the boroughs of Rutherford and East Rutherford were carved out from Union Township, choosing the railroad tracks as the mutual border.

The station building has been listed in the New Jersey Register of Historic Places and National Register of Historic Places since 1984 and is part of the Operating Passenger Railroad Stations Thematic Resource.

=== Restoration ===
A two phase restoration project was started by New Jersey Transit in May 2008. The first phase to restore the outside of the building cost $1.4 million and was completed in June 2009. The second phase of the project was to restore the interior and cost $1.9 million. The second phase was completed on October 25, 2010.

== Station layout ==
The station has two tracks, each with a low-level side platform.

== See also ==
- List of New Jersey Transit stations
- National Register of Historic Places listings in Bergen County, New Jersey

== Bibliography ==
- Lucas, Walter Arndt (1944). From the Hills to the Hudson: A History of the Paterson and Hudson River Rail Road and its Associates, the Paterson and Ramapo, and the Union Railroads. New York, New York: The Cornwall Press. hdl:2027/uc1.b4536228.
- Van Valen, James M. (1900). History of Bergen County, New Jersey. New York, New York: New Jersey Publishing and Engraving Company.
