= Garfield station (NJ Transit) =

NJ Transit rail station

Garfield
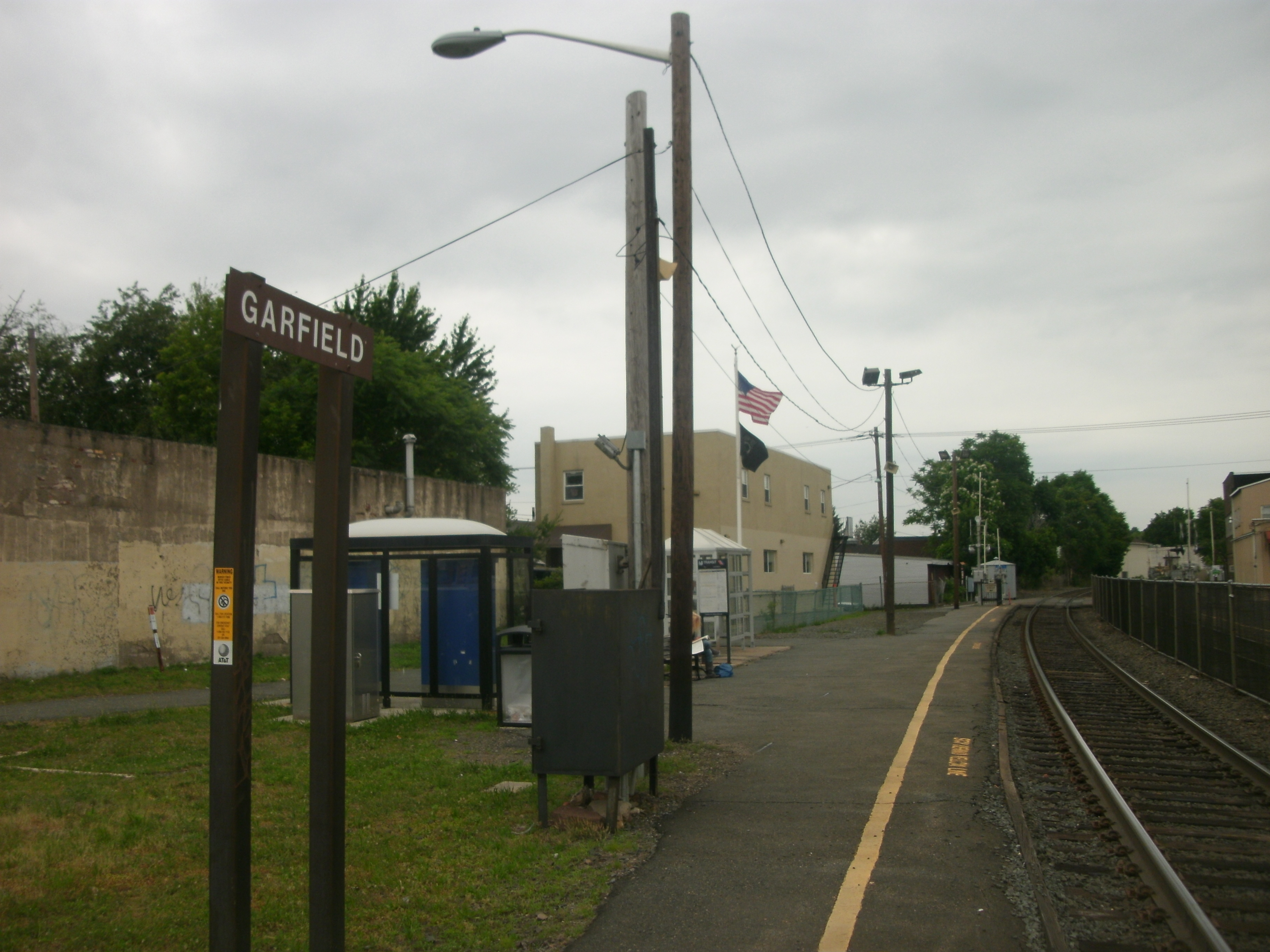
- Garfield station as seen in June 2011 facing northward from the inbound platform.

General information
- Location: Midland Avenue and Passaic Street, Garfield, New Jersey 07026
- Coordinates: 40.8664°N 74.1054°W
- Owner: New Jersey Transit
- Platforms: 2 low-level side platforms
- Tracks: 2
- Connections: NJT Bus: 160, 161, 702, 707, 709, and 758

Other information
- Station code: 2113 (Erie Railroad)
- Fare zone: 4

History
- Opened: October 1, 1881

Key dates
- June 18, 1973: Station depot burns

Passengers
- 2025: 103 (average weekday)
- Rank: 118 of 153

Services
Preceding station	NJ Transit	Following station
Plauderville toward Suffern	Bergen County Line	Wesmont toward Hoboken
Former services
Preceding station	Erie Railroad	Following station
Plauderville toward Ridgewood	Bergen County Railroad	Rutherford toward Jersey City
Location

Garfield station is an active commuter railroad station in the city of Garfield, Bergen County, New Jersey. Located at the north end of a bridge over Midland Avenue (County Route 67), the station services trains of NJ Transit's Bergen County Line between Suffern station in Suffern, New York and Waldwick station in Waldwick, New Jersey to Hoboken Terminal on the west side of the Hudson River. Garfield station consists of two asphalt low-level side platforms. It is one of two stations in Garfield on the Bergen County Line, with Plauderville at Outwater Lane. Garfield station is devoid of any parking for cars.

Garfield station began with the construction of the Bergen County Shortcut between Rutherford–East Rutherford station and Ridgewood station. That line opened on October 1, 1881. The station depot was a small one-story wooden frame station on the inbound tracks. It burned down in a fire on June 18, 1973.

== History ==
Until somewhat recently, both stations in Garfield were relatively bare bones in structure. However, in 2011, Plauderville, the other station in Garfield, received a major upgrade by means of new high level handicap-accessible platforms. Coupled with its much greater amount of parking in comparison to Garfield Station, it receives higher ridership.

The station depot at Garfield burned down in 1973.

== Station layout ==
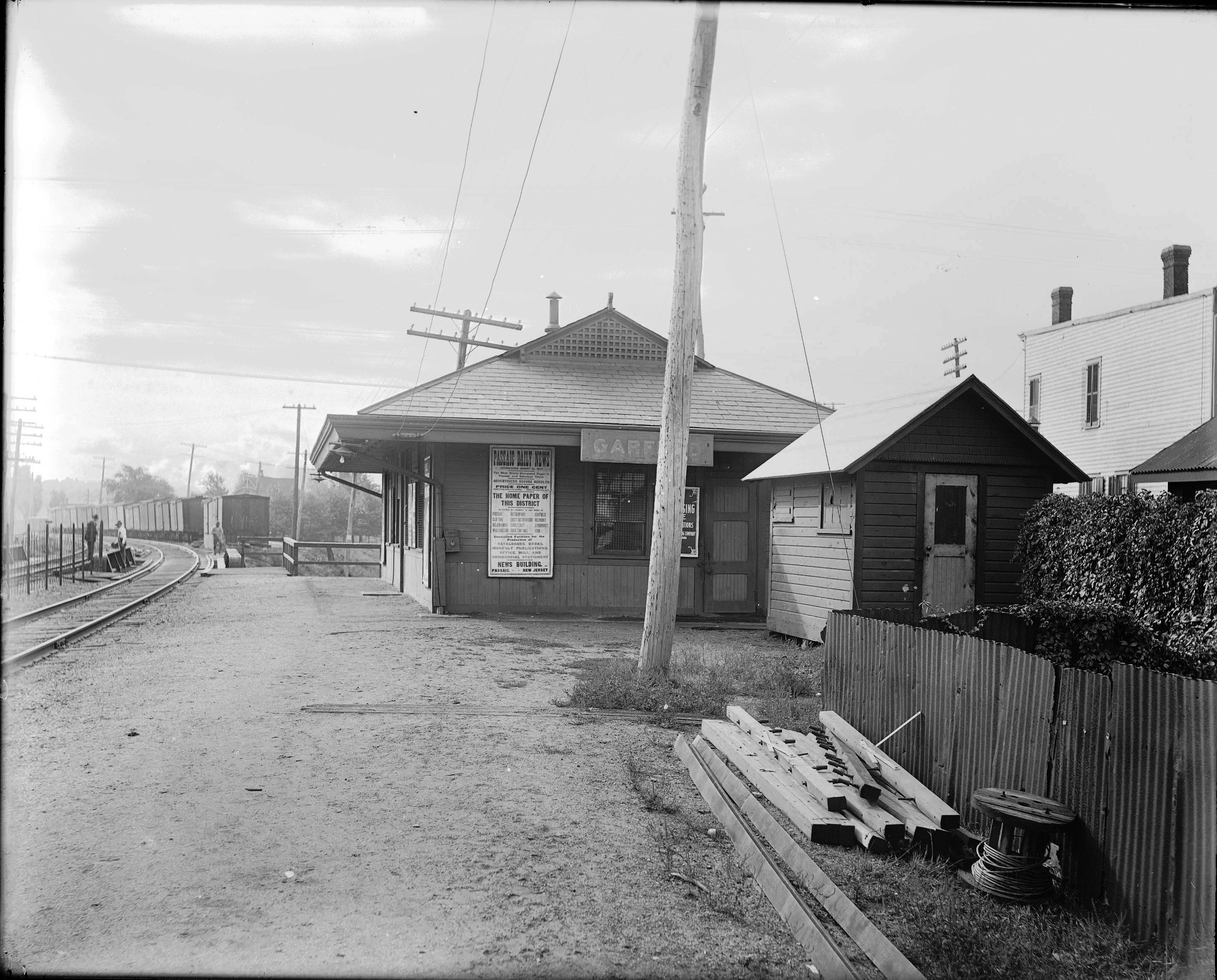
The former station depot at Garfield, c. 1907–1912

The station has two tracks, each with a low-level side platform.

Parking is also very limited, as there are only bicycle racks on the Hoboken-bound platform and no street automobile parking. Pedestrian access is available via two staircases on Passaic Street, and at grade level on Somerset Street which runs near the end of the platforms.

== Bibliography ==
- Poor, Henry Varnum (1884). Poor's Manual of Railroads. Pittsburgh, Pennsylvania: H.V. & H.W. Poor.
