= Broadway station (NJ Transit) =

NJ Transit rail station

Broadway
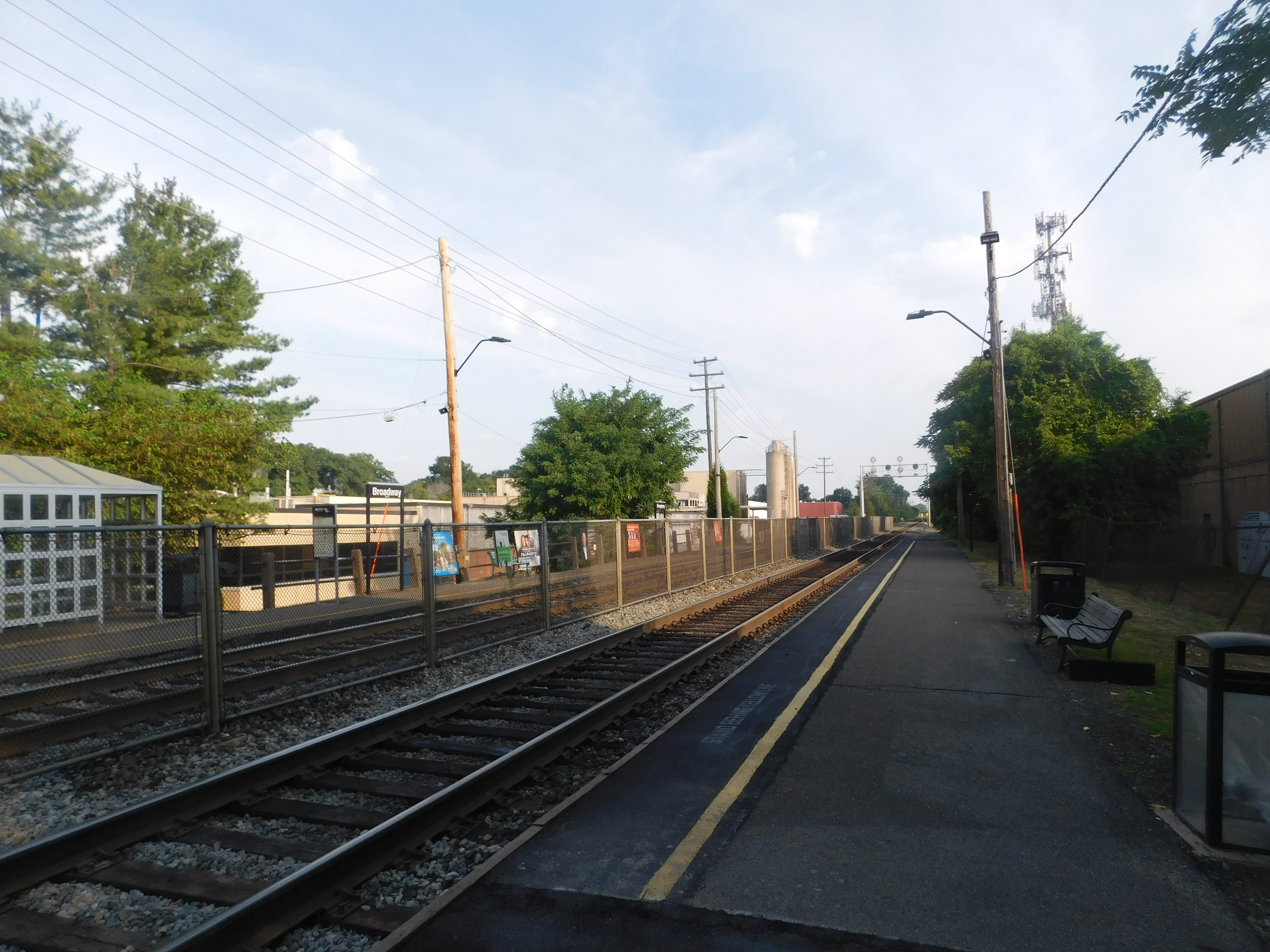
- The station at Broadway seen from the Suffern-bound platform in August 2025.

General information
- Location: Route 4 at East 55th Street, Fair Lawn, New Jersey
- Coordinates: 40.9223°N 74.1152°W
- Owner: NJ Transit
- Platforms: 2 side platforms
- Tracks: 2
- Connections: NJ Transit Bus: 144, 160, 770

Other information
- Station code: 2123 (Erie Railroad)
- Fare zone: 6

History
- Opened: October 1, 1881
- Rebuilt: 1934
- Former names: Warren Point

Key dates
- November 17, 1933: Station depot burns

Passengers
- 2025: 210 (average weekday)
- Rank: 101 of 153

Services
Preceding station	NJ Transit	Following station
Radburn toward Suffern	Bergen County Line	Plauderville toward Hoboken
Former services
Preceding station	Erie Railroad	Following station
Radburn toward Ridgewood	Bergen County Railroad	Plauderville toward Jersey City
Location

Broadway (also known as Broadway–Fair Lawn) is an NJ Transit train station served by the Bergen County Line located in Fair Lawn, in Bergen County, New Jersey, United States. It is one of two NJ Transit train stations in Fair Lawn, the other being Radburn. The station is located on an overpass above Route 4, which is known as Broadway in Elmwood Park and Fair Lawn.

== History ==
In early April 1932, Councilman Thomas Knott made a suggestion to the Fair Lawn Borough Council rename the station from Warren Point to a new name. The idea was supported by the council that they would approve the proposal at their next meeting. However, there was immediate opposition to the renaming proposal. The Fair Lawn Civic Association held a meeting at Visentin's Country Club on Saddle River Road on May 3 and several speakers voiced their opposition to the proposal. One presented a petition to continue the use of Warren Point as the name of the station and that they should be at the next council meeting to continue their protest. The same member also accused Fair Lawn Postmaster, Charles Challice, of trying to getting the name of the post office changed and that the proposal with the Borough Council would help his cause. The official reason was stated that the name "Warren Point" was there before the name "Fair Lawn".

Knott made a public comment to the Bergen Evening Record on May 7 about the comments made at the Fair Lawn Civic Association meeting. He denied that there was any collusion on removing the Warren Point name from the station, stating that his proposal was to stop sectionalism in the borough. Knott also denied the involvement of Charles Challice in the decision making. Knott stated that he never discussed anything with Chalice before his proposal at a Borough Council meeting. The Fair Lawn Civic Association noted that Knott wrote to the Erie Railroad to request the station be renamed. At the Borough Council meeting on June 14, they announced that the Erie Railroad responded to Knott's letter. The railroad requested the Borough Council reconsider their proposal to rename the station.

On the morning of November 17, 1933, an overheated stove left unattended set the depot at Warren Point aflame at 5:30 a.m.. The single-alarm fire was settled by the Warren Point Fire Company until the blaze re-strengthened around 10:00 a.m. while waiting for a second fire company. The second blaze totaled the depot, causing about $1,000 in damage. The railroad rebuilt the station in the winter of 1934, partially using insurance from the burned depot. At a cost of $2,200, the new station would be 14 by 18 feet (4.3 m × 5.5 m) in size with fireproof materials used in the construction.

=== Route 4 overpass (1940–1947) ===
In January 1940, Fair Lawn Police Chief Michael Vanore stated that the Erie should be asked to move the 1934-built depot away from its location on Route 4 and Rosalie Street. Vanore stated that the location of the depot was at a bottleneck point Route 4 near the bridge the railroad used to cross the road. On top of that, with no dedicated parking, vehicles waiting for commuters would park on the road, causing hazardous congestion. The neighboring municipality of East Paterson opposed to the moving of the depot. Councilman Mario Augusta wrote to the railroad to make their opposition official, stating that the station depot being moved would result in it making harder for residents of East Paterson's Rosemont neighborhood to reach the station.

A year later, Chief Vanore made a similar request that the Borough Council outlaw parking on Route 4 eastbound for 150 feet (46 m) west of Turnbridge Road. Vanore stated that if they would not eliminate on the street parking, that moving the depot would be necessary. In May 1941, the New Jersey State Highway Commissioner, E. Donald Sterner, requested $175,000 (1941 USD) in federal funding to rectify the bottleneck on Route 4 at the station. The Morning Call of Paterson noted that the width of Route 4 shrunk from 97 feet (30 m) to 40 feet (12 m) when crossing under the railroad. Accidents dating back to 1931 caused at least two fatalities, including an accident in which someone burned to death in their vehicle on March 24, 1931. Vanore stated that their statistics did not include the minor accidents and collisions that went unreported. Vanore stated that he would prefer an island be built in the center of Route 4 to Arcola Circle so that they could slow the speed of traffic and limit turns.

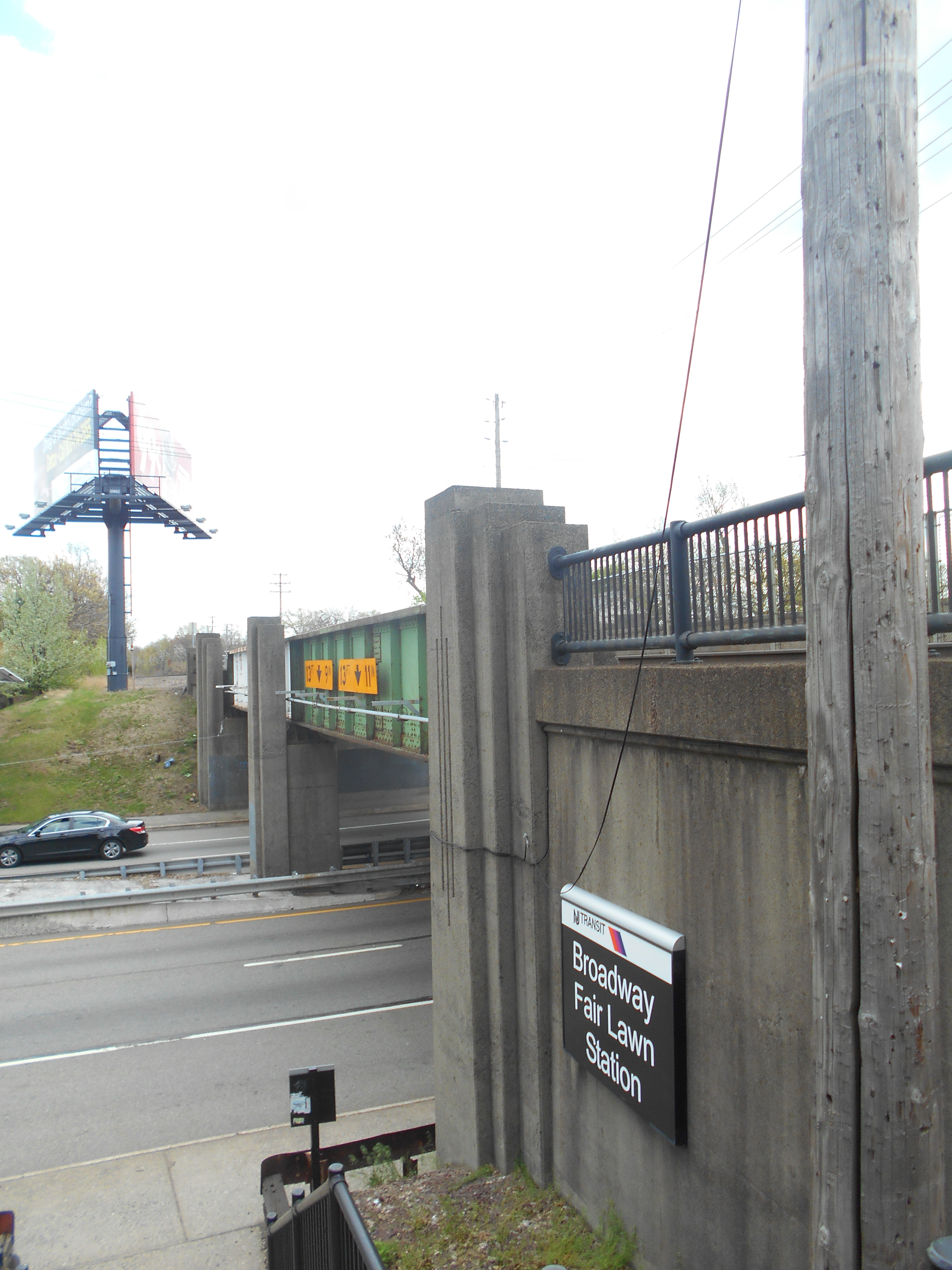
The Bergen County Shortcut bridge over Route 4

In September 1941, the Fair Lawn Borough Council announced that after consultation with the New Jersey State Highway Department that they would ban angle parking and u-turns on Route 4. The State Highway Department also rejected a system of traffic lights on Route 4 due to the lack of cross streets in Fair Lawn.

On August 31, 1945, Governor of New Jersey Walter E. Edge announced that the State Highway Commissioner, Spencer Miller Jr., could put out an advertisement for bids on widening Route 4 at the Warren Point station. The project would be funded at $230,000 out of a $4.295 million public works expenditure. Work would begin when the War Production Board would eliminate the outlaw of construction projects over $100,000, which was expected in September. On October 3, Miller Jr. announced that the Ell Dorer Contracting Company of Irvington would receive the contract with a bid of $187,782.

Construction of the widening began in August 1946. Construction involved building a temporary wooden bridge to the east of the existing bridge to maintain train schedules on the Bergen County Shortcut. By July 1947, the bridge was nearly complete, with the full concrete and steel bridge put together designed by the Erie Railroad.

=== Recent history ===
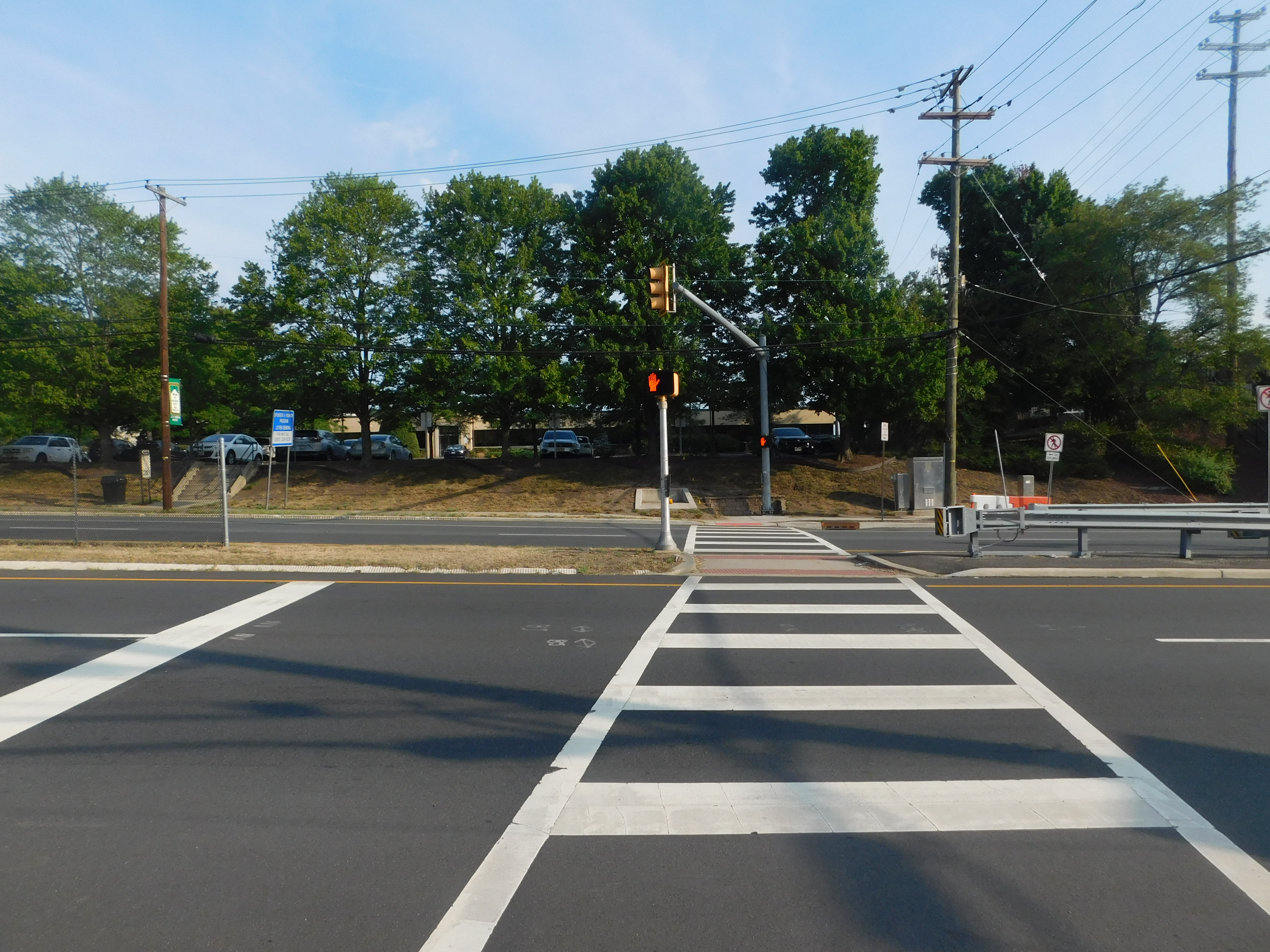
The crossing of Route 4 installed in 2015, seen in August 2025

In 2008, a group of local store owners asked the New Jersey Department of Transportation (NJDOT) to improve Route 4 at Broadway station due to concerns about accidents and pedestrian strikes. Their original proposal was a traffic light at the pedestrian crossing. NJDOT first reduced the 40-mile-per-hour (64 km/h) speed limit down to 35 miles per hour (56 km/h) and repainted the intersection. They also installed a flashing pedestrian crossing sign to alert drivers in 2011, which led to several accidents. In 2012, Broadway Improvement Corporation, the group of store owners, got a grant for $300,000 to try a different strategy for improving pedestrian crossings from East 55th Street.

In 2015, NJDOT installed a new system to maintain pedestrian safety at the station. This new system would involve new traffic lights being installed that were synced with ones further down Route 4, relocation of the pedestrian crosswalk and pedestrian control of the crosswalk lights. The new system would allow 30 seconds to cross Route 4.

== Station layout ==
The station has two tracks, each with a low-level side platform. No parking for the station is available in Fair Lawn. An 80-space permit parking lot is available across Broadway at East 55th Street in Elmwood Park. The station is accessible on foot from Broadway and Rosalie Street, the latter of which dead ends at the Suffern-bound (northbound) platform, and from Broadway using two separate staircases. The Hoboken-bound (southbound) platform has a ticket machine and a shelter.

== Bibliography ==
- Poor, Henry Varnum (1884). Poor's Manual of Railroads. Pittsburgh, Pennsylvania: H.V. & H.W. Poor.
