= Wesmont station (NJ Transit) =

NJ Transit rail station

Wesmont
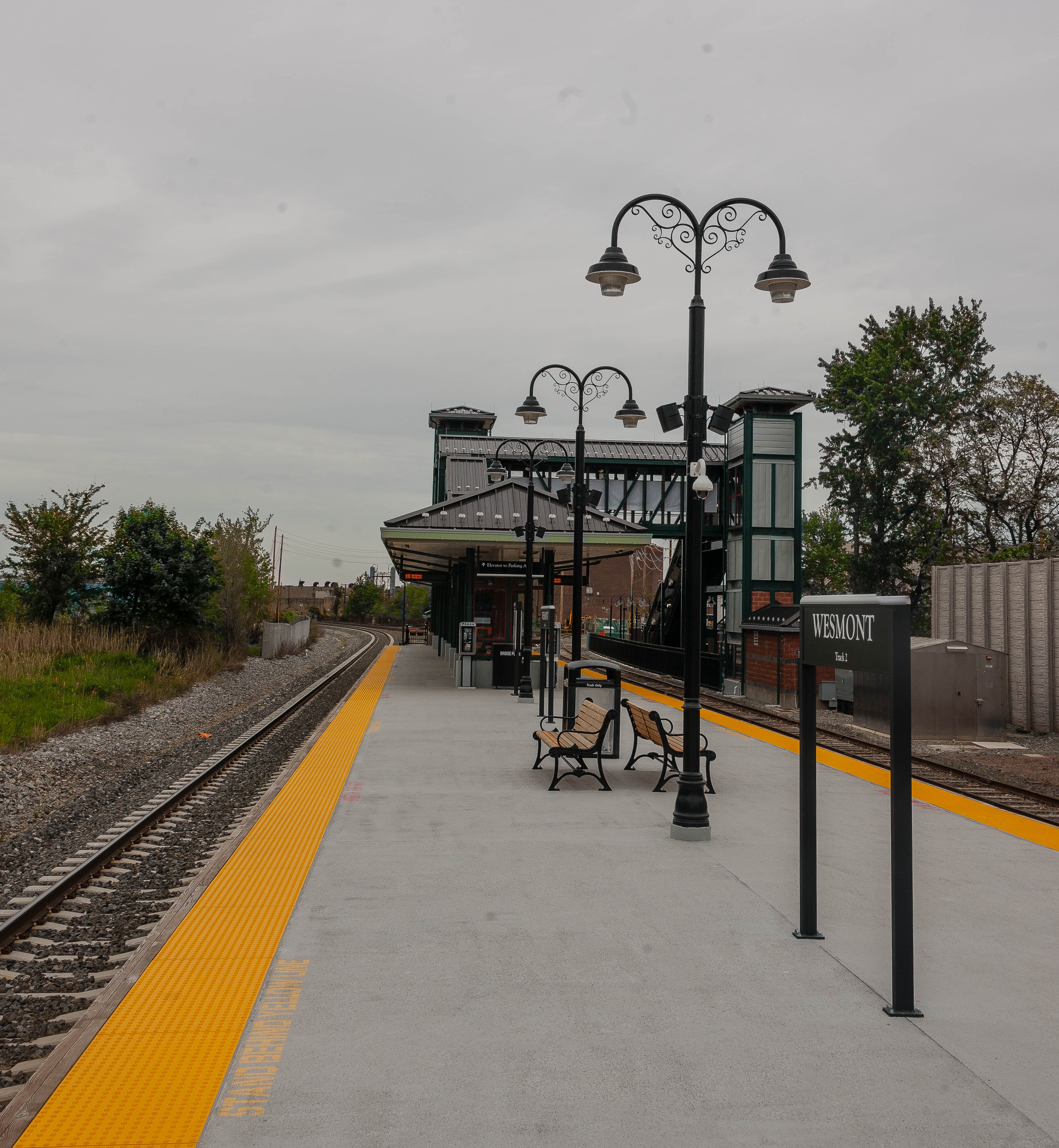
- Wesmont station shortly after its May 2016 opening

General information
- Location: Highland Avenue and Johnson Drive, Wood-Ridge, New Jersey
- Coordinates: 40.8553°N 74.0969°W
- Platforms: 1 island platform
- Tracks: 2

Construction
- Parking: 28 spaces (temporary); 215 spaces (planned)
- Accessible: yes

Other information
- Fare zone: 4

History
- Opened: May 15, 2016

Passengers
- 2025: 266 (average weekday)
- Rank: 91 of 153

Services
Preceding station	NJ Transit	Following station
Garfield toward Suffern	Bergen County Line	Rutherford toward Hoboken
Location

Wesmont is a commuter rail station on the New Jersey Transit (NJT) Bergen County Line, located in Wood-Ridge, New Jersey, positioned between Garfield and Rutherford stations and two stops away from Secaucus Junction. Wesmont opened on May 15, 2016, as part of the $400 million Wesmont Station development project, surrounding a former Curtiss-Wright aircraft engine factory. The station is the newest in the NJ Transit Rail Operations network, in terms of being considered "newly built", as of 2026, but the nearby Lyndhurst station received major renovations before reopening in 2025, leading to the closure of the adjacent Kingsland rail station. The station and tracks are located along Wood-Ridge's boundary with neighboring Wallington, although the platform can only be reached from Wood-Ridge. Wesmont is one of two rail stations in Wood-Ridge; the Pascack Valley Line serves the older Wood-Ridge station.

== History ==
NJT announced plans for the station on June 11, 2008, with the overall re-development of the 70-acre (28 ha) site expected to include over 700 housing units, 130,000 square feet (12,000 m^{2}) of retail and office space, a middle school and a community center. Construction was scheduled to begin in 2009, with the station originally due to open in 2011. However, PCB contamination of the land required extensive environmental cleanup, after previous work for asbestos removal.

The first residential apartments opened on February 14, 2012, and the train station had its official groundbreaking on March 11, 2014. The station quietly opened on May 15, 2016, without a formal ceremony.

The station cost $18 million to build, with $6 million from NJ Transit and $12 million from Somerset Development. The station was built by Anselmi & DeCicco, Inc. of Maplewood, New Jersey and has a 216-space parking lot, but only a 28-space temporary lot was available at the station's opening. Pedestrian and cycle routes are being developed to improve station access from nearby residential areas.

== Station layout ==
The station has one high-level island platform connected to the street by a walkway over the northbound track.

== See also ==
- List of NJ Transit stations
