= Radburn station =

NJ Transit rail station

Radburn
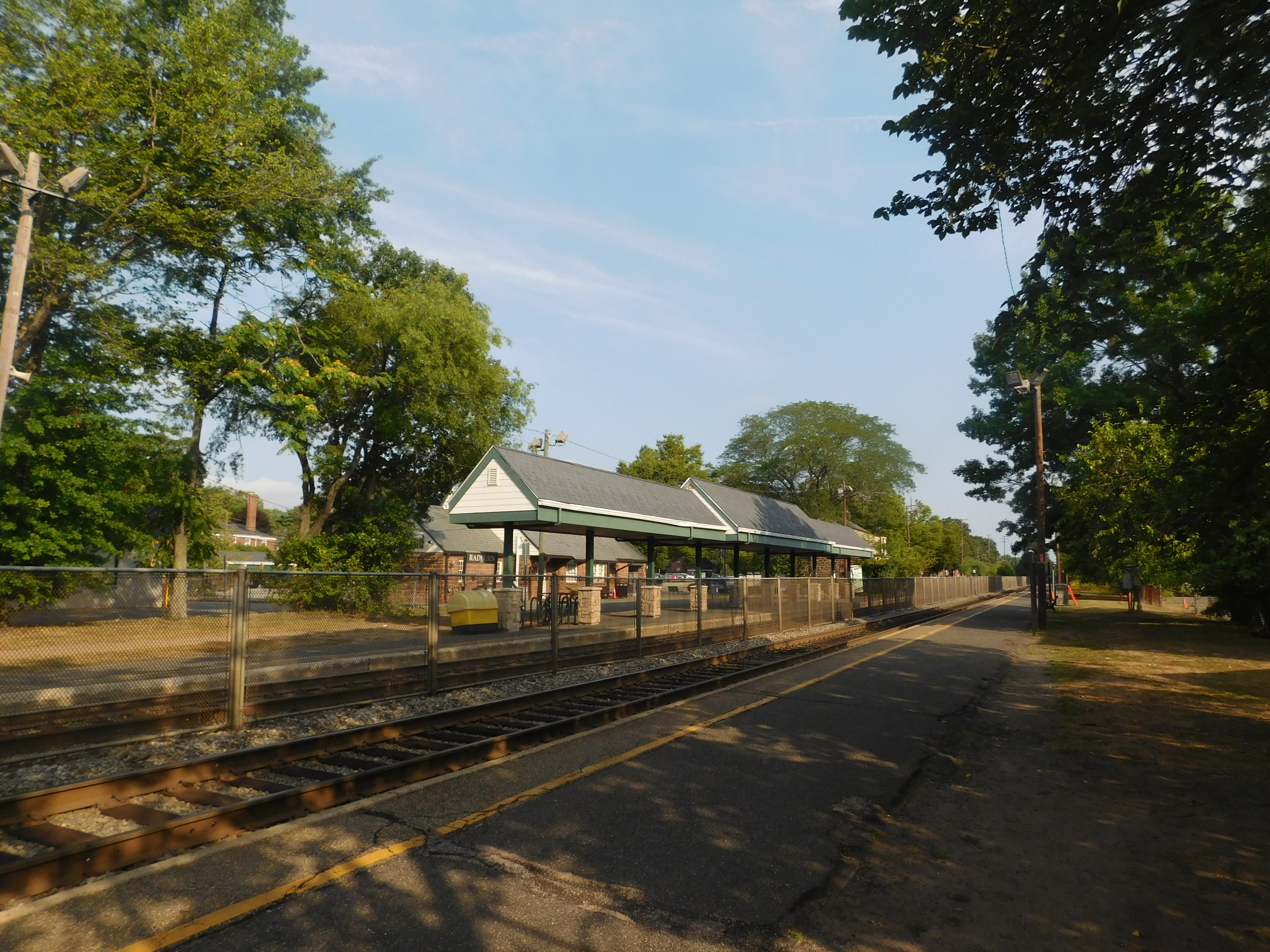
- Radburn station platforms in August 2025, seen from the outbound direction.

General information
- Location: Pollitt Drive at Fair Lawn Avenue (CR 76), Fair Lawn, New Jersey
- Coordinates: 40.9396°N 74.1217°W
- Owner: New Jersey Transit
- Platforms: 2 side platforms
- Tracks: 2
- Connections: NJT Bus: 145 and 171

Other information
- Fare zone: 6

History
- Opened: October 1, 1881
- Rebuilt: April–October 1929

Passengers
- 2025: 866 (average weekday)
- Rank: 34 of 153

Services
Preceding station	NJ Transit	Following station
Glen Rock–Boro Hall toward Suffern	Bergen County Line	Broadway toward Hoboken
Former services
Preceding station	Erie Railroad	Following station
Glen Rock-Bergen Line toward Ridgewood	Bergen County Railroad	Fair Lawn toward Jersey City
- Radburn-Fair Lawn Station
- U.S. National Register of Historic Places
- New Jersey Register of Historic Places
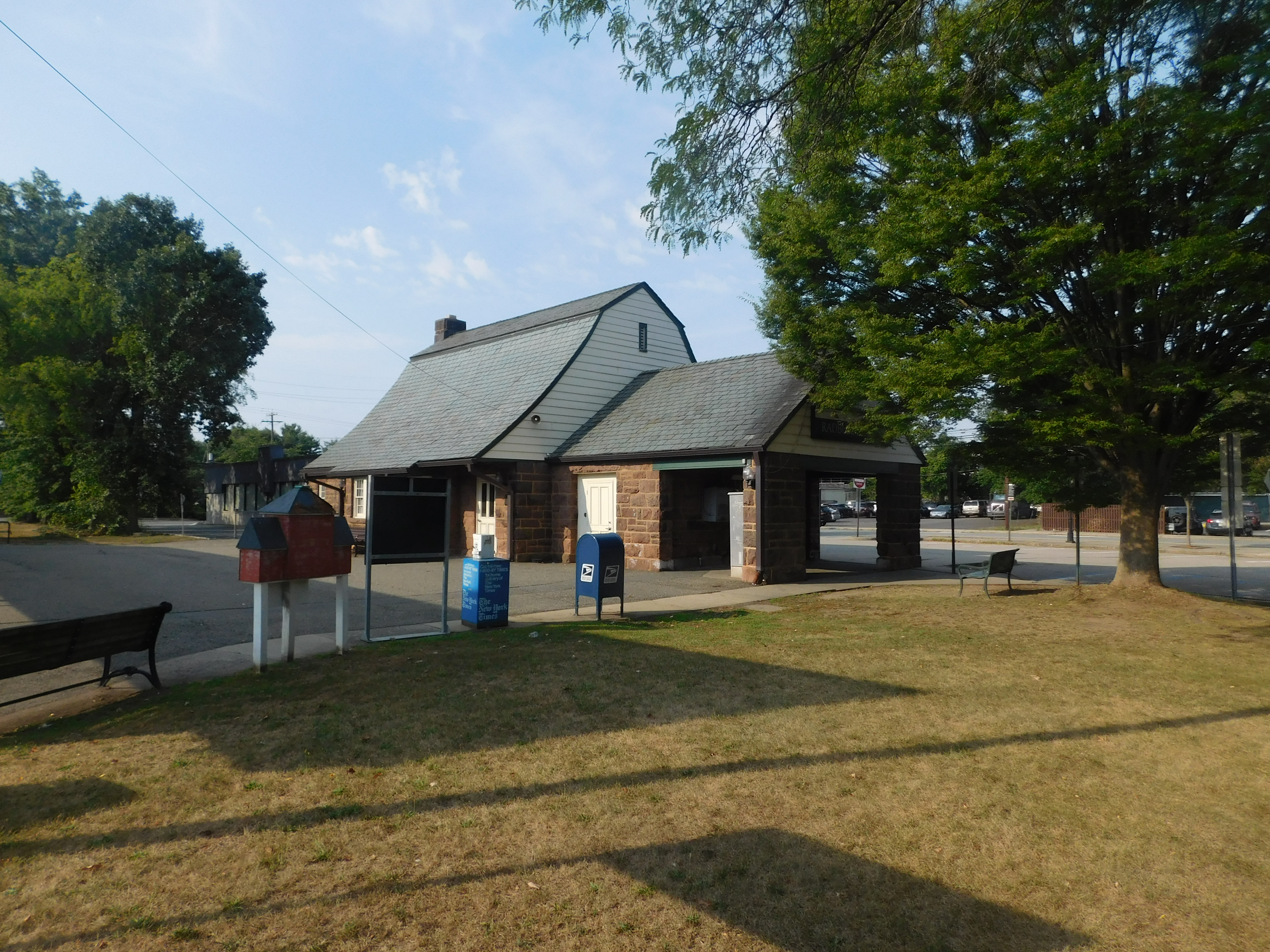
- The station depot at Radburn in August 2025.
- Location: Pollitt Drive, Fair Lawn, New Jersey
- Coordinates: 40°56′22″N 74°7′19″W
- Area: 0.3 acres (0.1 ha)
- Built: 1929
- Architect: Clarence S. Stein
- Architectural style: Dutch Colonial Revival
- MPS: Operating Passenger Railroad Stations TR
- NRHP reference No.: 84002580
- NJRHP No.: 483

Significant dates
- Added to NRHP: June 22, 1984
- Designated NJRHP: March 17, 1984
Location

Radburn is a New Jersey Transit train station in the Dutch Colonial Revival style, served by the Bergen County Line. It is on Fair Lawn Avenue in the Radburn section of Fair Lawn, in Bergen County, New Jersey, United States. It is one of two New Jersey Transit train stations in Fair Lawn, the other being Broadway.

The station was designed and built in 1929 by Clarence Stein, as part of the Radburn development. It has been listed in the state and federal Registers of Historic Places since 1984 and is part of the Operating Passenger Railroad Stations Thematic Resource.

== History ==
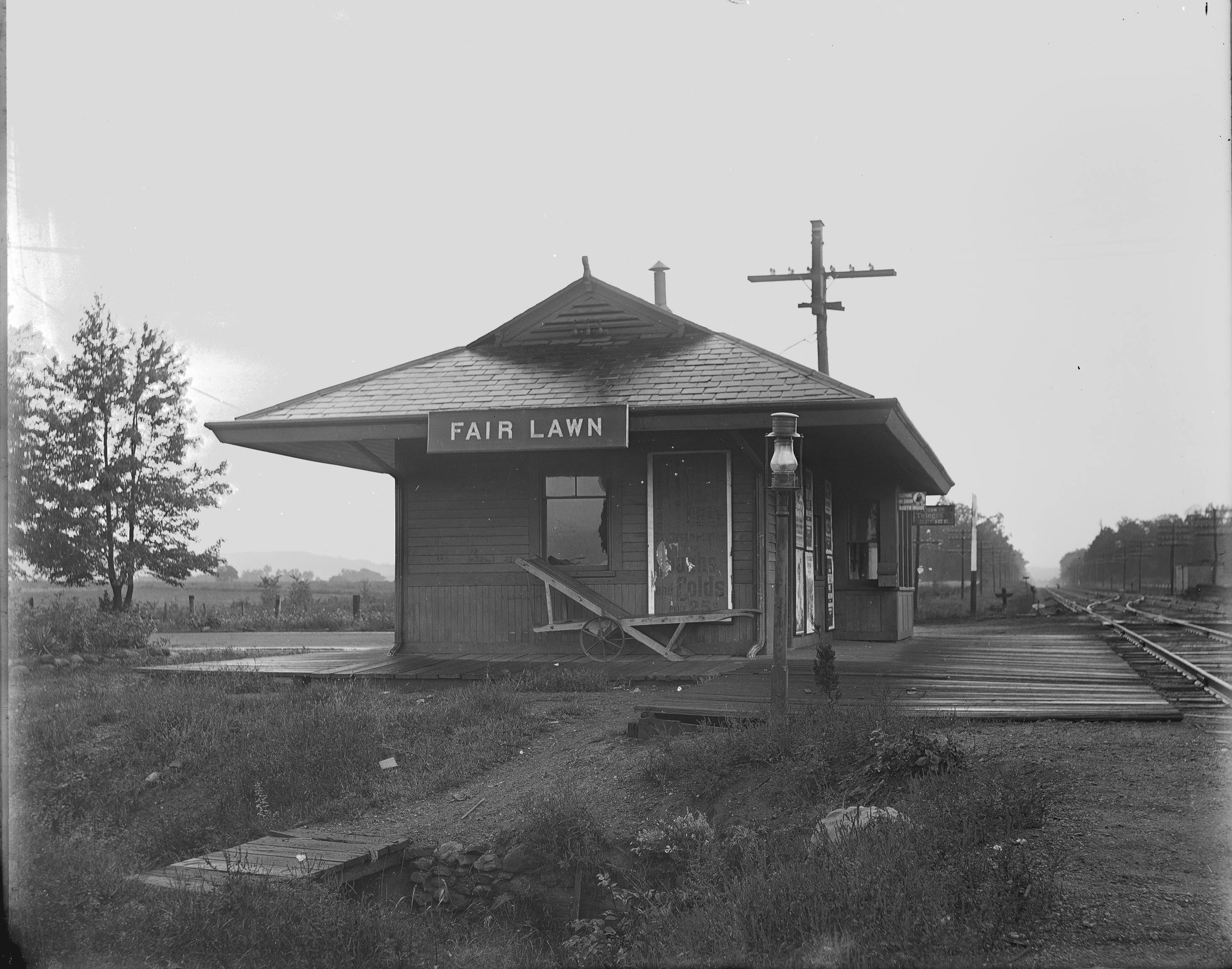
The former station depot at Radburn, when the station was known as Fair Lawn

The location of the Radburn development was considered beneficial because of its location on the Erie Railroad with connections to Jersey City, Newark and Manhattan. The designers of the development saw the benefit of a suburban railroad station for planning throughout the New York Metropolitan Area. In July 1928, they proposed the Fairlawn Station Square with a depot that cost $60,000 (1928 USD) and would serve those who would be in the neighborhood after construction of the first 200 homers. The new depot would serve Suffern to the north and Hoboken to the southeast along with connections in the area.

A new railroad depot was constructed on the Bergen County Railroad in 1929. The depot replaced a wooden freight depot that served the area. This new station was designed by Clarence Stein in a Dutch Colonial Revival to keep the idea of modern and efficient and in a similar style of the Radburn neighborhood. The new Radburn station had three sections: a central area that contained the 640-foot (200 m) waiting room and ticket office. This new pavilion contained a sloping and overhanging roof. This south wing of the depot contained the restrooms, and the north wing contained the office of the track supervisor, the baggage room and a porch for customers. The depot had a sandstone design with 14-foot (4.3 m) vaulted ceilings with a slate roof and clapboarding siding.

== Station layout ==
The station has two tracks, each with a low-level side platform. It is staffed with a station agent on weekday mornings.

== See also ==
- List of New Jersey Transit stations
- National Register of Historic Places listings in Bergen County, New Jersey

== Bibliography ==
- Clayton, W. Woodford (1882). History of Bergen and Passaic Counties, New Jersey: With Biographical Sketches of Many of Its Pioneers and Prominent Men. Philadelphia, Pennsylvania: Everts & Peck.
- Poor, Henry Varnum (1884). Poor's Manual of Railroads. Pittsburgh, Pennsylvania: H.V. & H.W. Poor.
