= Glen Rock–Boro Hall station =

NJ Transit rail station

Glen Rock Boro Hall
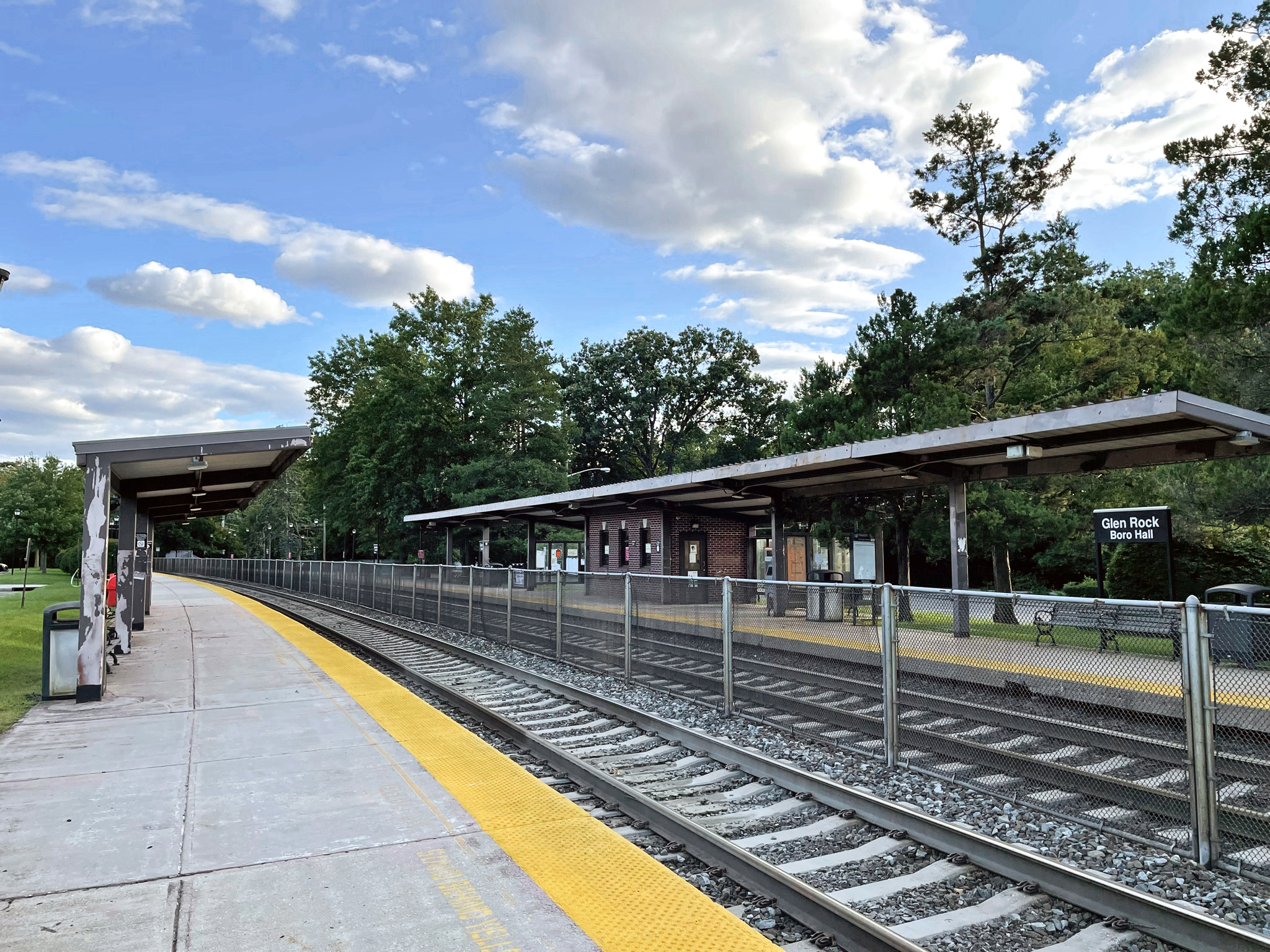
- Glen Rock–Boro Hall station facing southbound towards Radburn station

General information
- Location: Rock Road (CR 134) at Harding Plaza, Glen Rock, New Jersey
- Coordinates: 40.9614°N 74.1292°W
- Owner: New Jersey Transit
- Platforms: 2 side platforms
- Tracks: 2
- Connections: NJT Bus: 164, 175 (at adjacent bus station); 746 (on Maple Avenue)

Other information
- Fare zone: 8

History
- Opened: October 1, 1881
- Former names: Paramus (1881–1891)

Passengers
- 2025: 437 (average weekday)
- Rank: 66 of 153

Services
Preceding station	NJ Transit	Following station
Ridgewood toward Suffern	Bergen County Line	Radburn toward Hoboken
Former services
Preceding station	Erie Railroad	Following station
Ridgewood Terminus	Bergen County Railroad	Radburn toward Jersey City
Location

Glen Rock–Boro Hall is one of two railroad stations operated by New Jersey Transit in the borough of Glen Rock, Bergen County, New Jersey, United States on the Bergen County Line. Its name comes from the fact that the Glen Rock Municipal Building is located immediately east of the station, and to differentiate it from the Glen Rock–Main Line station, which lies two blocks west on Rock Road (County Route 134).

== History ==
The station opened on October 1, 1881 as Paramus. The station was renamed in 1891.

== Station layout ==
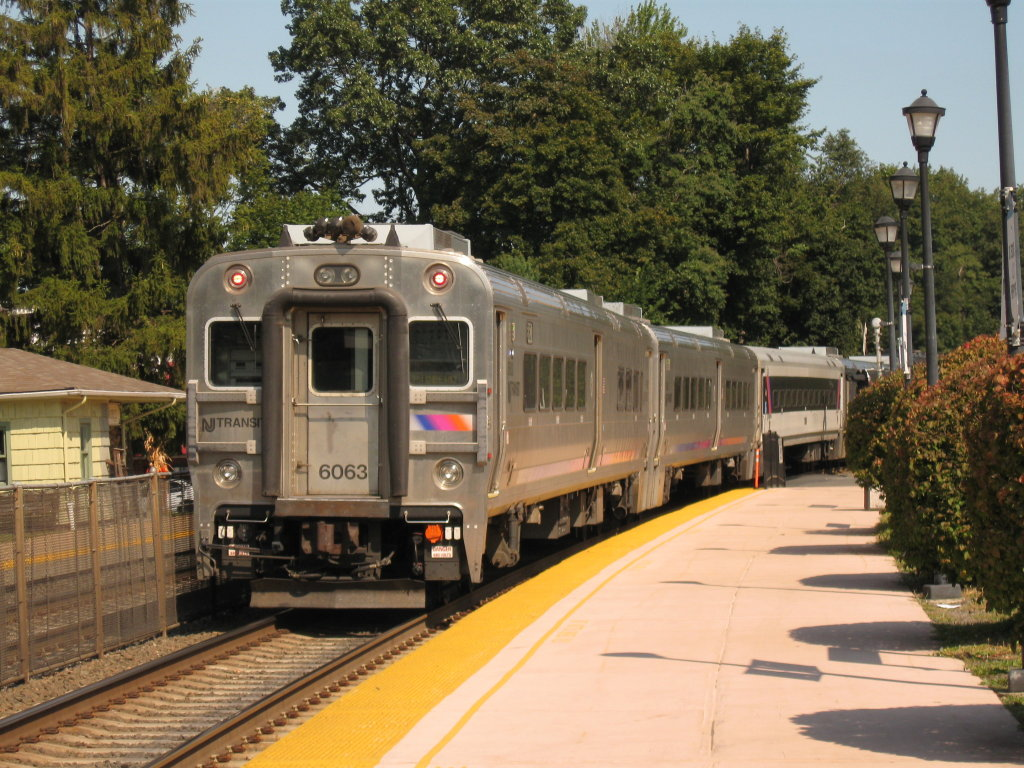
Train no. 1253 departing Glen Rock–Boro Hall station

The station has two tracks, each with a low-level side platform. Although the platforms are not high-level, Glen Rock–Boro Hall is handicap accessible via use of two ramps, one on either side of the platform.

Pedestrian access to both platforms is available along Rock Road, and from a pedestrian underpass on Maple Avenue and the entrance to the station's parking lot on Glen Avenue. Paid parking is available by use of a ticket machine system; previously the borough employed parking meters.

The Glen Rock–Boro Hall station is located two blocks east from the Glen Rock–Main Line station.

== Bibliography ==
- Poor, Henry Varnum (1884). Poor's Manual of Railroads. Pittsburgh, Pennsylvania: H.V. & H.W. Poor.
