= Bergen County Line =

Commuter rail line in New Jersey

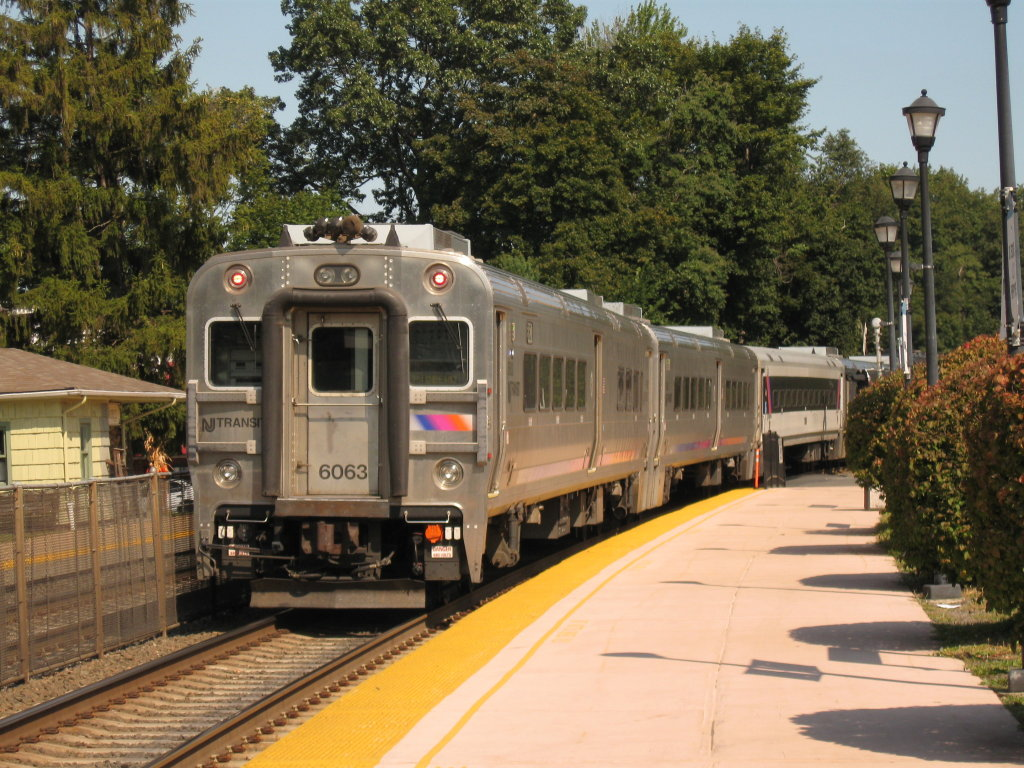
- Train #1253 departs Glen Rock–Boro Hall.

Overview
- Owner: New Jersey Transit (Hoboken Terminal to Suffern); Norfolk Southern Railway (Suffern to Port Jervis, leased to and maintained by Metro-North Railroad)
- Locale: Northern New Jersey
- Termini: Hoboken Terminal; Waldwick or Suffern
- Stations: 12 (to Waldwick); 17 (service to Suffern)

Service
- Type: Commuter rail
- System: New Jersey Transit Rail Operations; Metro-North Railroad
- Operator: New Jersey Transit
- Rolling stock: F40PH-3C/GP40PH-2/ALP-45DP/PL42AC locomotives Comet V/Multilevel coaches
- Daily ridership: 17,300 (Q1, FY 2025) (Note: Includes ridership from Main Line)

Technical
- Line length: 30.5 mi (49.1 km)
- Track gauge: 4 ft 8 1/2 in (1,435 mm) standard gauge

The Bergen County Line is a commuter rail line and service owned and operated by New Jersey Transit in the U.S. state of New Jersey. The line is a branch of the Main Line and the line loops off the Main Line between the Meadowlands and Glen Rock, with trains continuing in either direction along the Main Line. It is colored on NJT system maps in grey, and its symbol is a cattail, which are commonly found in the Meadowlands where the line runs.

Some trains of Metro-North Railroad's Port Jervis Line also operate over the line. The Norfolk Southern Railway provides freight service along the line via trackage rights.

As on the Main Line, trains are powered by diesel locomotives or the dual mode ALP-45DP locomotives operating as a push-pull, consisting of Comet V or MultiLevel coaches while some trains may also use Comet IIM or IV cars on rare occasions too.

== History ==
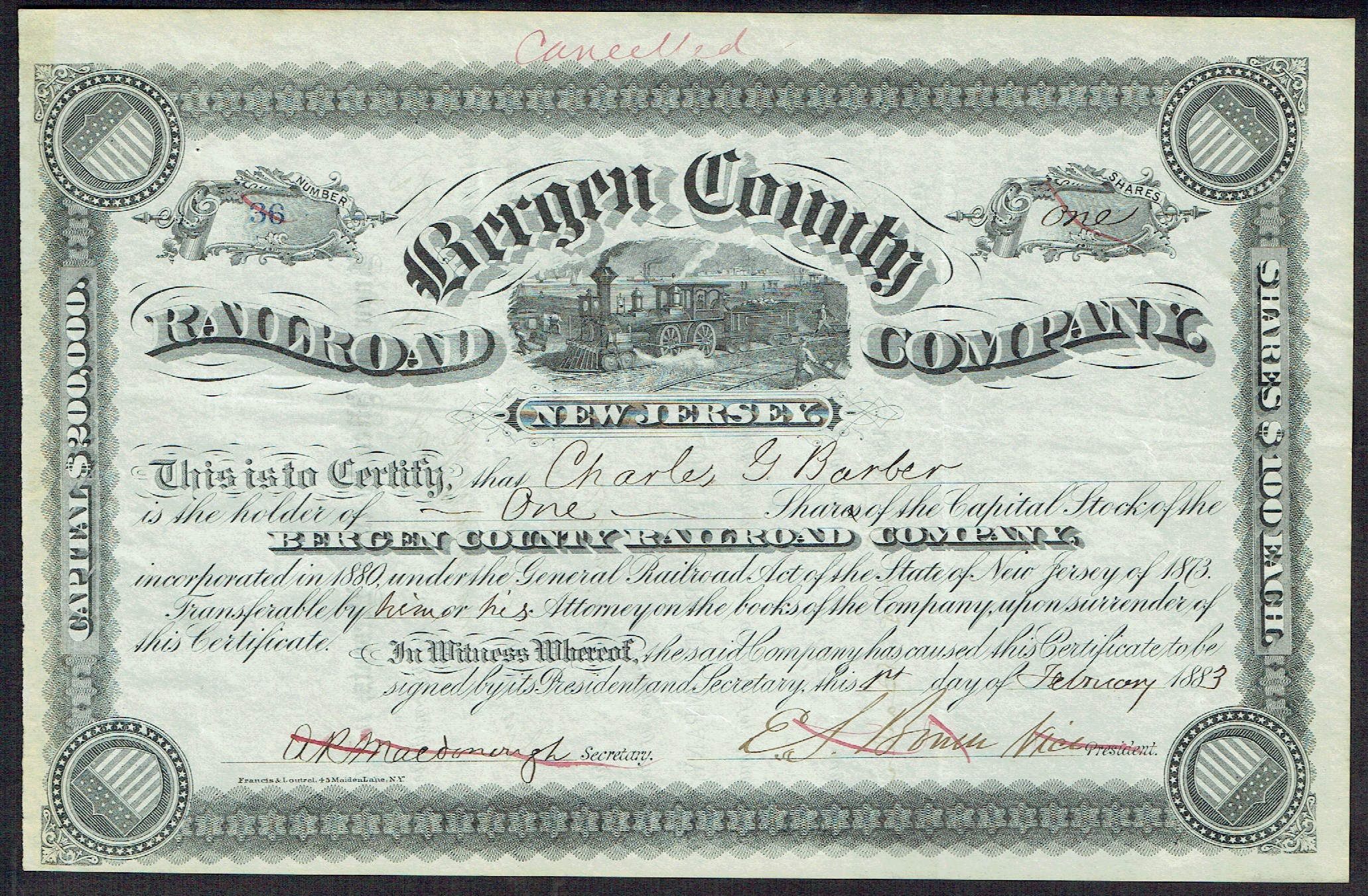
Share of the Bergen County Railroad Company, issued 1 February 1883

From a point in Secaucus, just south of the Hackensack River bridge near the former Harmon Cove station, to a point in East Rutherford north of the Rutherford station, the Bergen County Line uses the former Erie Railroad Main Line. This portion was opened in 1833 by the Paterson and Hudson River Railroad and leased by the New York and Erie Rail Road in 1852. The rest of the line, from East Rutherford north to Glen Rock, opened in 1881 as the Bergen County Railroad.

Until the late 1950s, the main function of the Erie's Bergen County Cutoff was as a freight (and long-distance express) bypass of the at-grade Main Line through Passaic. Commuter service was relatively minor. In 1963 the Lackawanna Boonton Branch up to Paterson (with a small portion of the Erie's Newark Branch) became the new Erie-Lackawanna Main Line. This was caused by the abandonment of the Main Line section through downtown Passaic and construction of Interstate 80 using the old Boonton Branch right-of-way in Paterson. The old Main Line east of Rutherford was now exclusively part of the Bergen County Line.

Prior to the opening of Secaucus Junction in 2003, Bergen County Line trains used a longer stretch of the old Erie Main Line in Secaucus, extending south to Croxton Yard and a merge with the former Lackawanna Boonton Branch. A curving track was built between the HX Drawbridge at Hackensack River and the Main Line west of Secaucus Junction to allow Bergen County Line trains to use the new station.

=== Secaucus train collision ===
On February 9, 1996, a Bergen County Line train collided with a Main Line train, killing 3 people and injuring 162. It was the New York City area and New Jersey's worst train accident since the 1958 Newark Bay rail accident when at least 48 people died.

=== 2007 Ridgewood Junction derailment ===
On February 21, 2007, a Bergen County Line train suffered a minor derailment after passing over an improperly repaired switch at Ridgewood Junction.

== Description ==
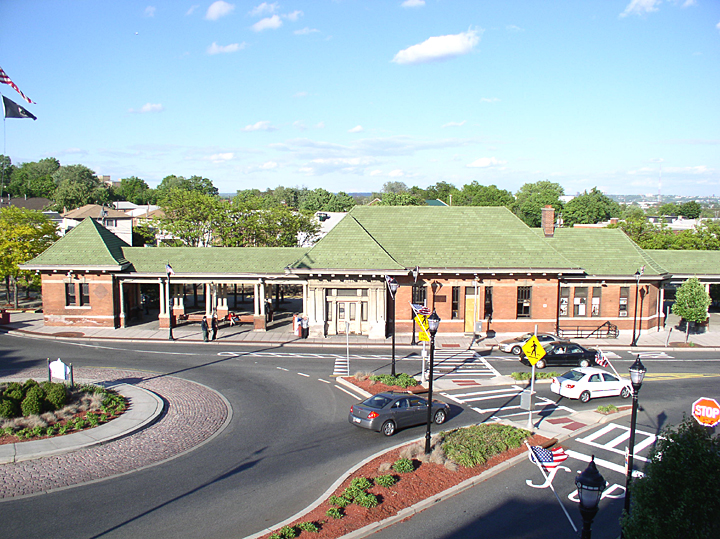
Rutherford station

West of Secaucus Junction, the Bergen County Line tracks diverge from the Main Line over a new right-of-way opened on December 15, 2003, connecting the Main Line with the Bergen County Line. During this stretch and traveling westbound, the Hackensack River is to the left, while warehouse and manufacturing facilities on Meadowlands Parkway are to the right. A former station, Harmon Cove, was located nearby along the old Erie right-of-way and served the nearby community between 1978 and 2003.

Soon the train joins the old Erie Main Line right-of-way and crosses the Hackensack over HX Bridge, a two-track bascule draw. For the next two miles, the train crosses the Meadowlands, under the New Jersey Turnpike western spur with the Meadowlands Sports Complex in East Rutherford visible in the distance to the right. Here, the track parallels Berrys Creek and eventually crosses it just before passing below Route 3.

Beyond Route 3, the landscape changes to industrial. Office buildings line the side of the track, some serviced by sidings. The Pascack Valley Line soon splits off to the right at Pascack Junction, and the train then crosses Route 17 and approaches the Rutherford station.

For a half-mile the train passes residences on either side, then swings right, abandoning the old Erie Main Line at 40.836°N 74.1042°W, and passes through industrial areas with several grade crossings. Soon, the tracks form the border of Carlstadt and Wallington. Presently the train passes Wood-Ridge and South Hackensack before reaching the Wesmont station, which opened on May 15, 2016. The train then swings left, crossing the Saddle River, and then right, into Garfield reaching the Garfield station.

The train continues northward through Garfield, passing homes, businesses, and Dahnerts Lake County Park before reaching the Plauderville station at Midland Avenue, the border between Garfield and neighboring Saddle Brook. Shortly after passing beneath U.S. Highway 46 the track becomes the border of Saddle Brook and Elmwood Park, once again crossing Midland Avenue. Interstate 80 passes above the train, which then crosses the Garden State Parkway. The Broadway station in Fair Lawn straddles a border formed by the track and Route 4.

In Fair Lawn, the line is paralleled by Plaza Road, named for Radburn Plaza, the commercial area serving the Radburn development for which the borough's more northerly station is named. The line crosses below Route 208 before reaching Radburn. Beyond the station, the train passes housing to the right and industry to the left, with a spur to the former location of an old local Nabisco plant. Next is the Glen Rock–Boro Hall station, which like its Main Line counterpart, is on Rock Road. The lines merge a short distance north of this point at Ridgewood Junction. The trains will continue north to either Waldwick or Suffern, and some peak trains will terminate at Ridgewood, which is the first station after the two lines join.

== Stations ==
State	Zone	Location	Station	Mile (km)	Date opened	Date closed	Line services			Connections
State	Zone	Location	Station	Mile (km)	Date opened	Date closed	BC	ML	PJ	Connections
NJ	1	Hoboken	Hoboken Terminal	0.0 (0.0)	1903		●	●	●	NJ Transit Rail: Gladstone, Main Line, Meadowlands, Montclair–Boonton, Morristown, Pascack Valley, and Raritan Valley Lines; Hudson-Bergen Light Rail: 8th Street-Hoboken, Hoboken-Tonnelle lines PATH: HOB-WTC, HOB-33, JSQ-33 (via HOB); NJ Transit Bus: 22, 23, 63, 64, 68, 85, 87, 89, 126; New York Waterway to Battery Park City
NJ	1	Secaucus	Secaucus Junction	3.5 (5.6)	December 15, 2003		●	●	●	NJ Transit Rail (upper level): Gladstone, Montclair–Boonton, Morristown, Northeast Corridor, North Jersey Coast, and Raritan Valley lines NJ Transit Rail (lower level): Main, Meadowlands and Pascack Valley lines NJ Transit Bus: 2, 78, 129, 329, 353
NJ	3	Secaucus	Harmon Cove		June 26, 1978	August 4, 2003				
NJ	3	Rutherford	Rutherford	8.4 (13.5)	December 4, 1833		●			NJ Transit Bus: 76, 190
NJ	4	Wood-Ridge	Wesmont	10.4 (16.7)	May 15, 2016		●			
NJ	4	Garfield	Garfield	11.3 (18.2)	October 1, 1881		●			NJ Transit Bus: 160, 161, 702, 707, 709, 758
NJ	4	Garfield	Spring Tank		October 1, 1881		●			Former station at Belmont Avenue in Garfield.
NJ	5	Garfield	Plauderville	12.7 (20.4)			●			NJ Transit Bus: 160, 758
NJ	6	Fair Lawn	Broadway	15.3 (24.6)	October 1, 1881		●			NJ Transit Bus: 144, 166, 770
NJ	6	Fair Lawn	Radburn	16.5 (26.6)	October 1, 1881		●			NJ Transit Bus: 145, 171
NJ	8	Glen Rock	Glen Rock–Boro Hall	18.2 (29.3)	October 1, 1881		●			NJ Transit Bus: 164, 175, 746
NJ	9	Ridgewood	Ridgewood	20.9 (33.6)	October 19, 1848		●	●		NJ Transit Bus: 163, 164, 175, 722, 746, 752
NJ	10	Ho-Ho-Kus	Ho-Ho-Kus	22.1 (35.6)	October 19, 1848		●	●		
NJ	10	Waldwick	Waldwick	23.2 (37.3)	1886		●	●		
NJ	11	Allendale	Allendale	24.6 (39.6)	October 19, 1848		●	●		
NJ	12	Ramsey	Ramsey	26.5 (42.6)	October 19, 1848		●	●		
NJ	13	Ramsey	Ramsey Route 17	27.9 (44.9)	August 22, 2004		●	●	●	
NJ	14	Mahwah	Mahwah	29.1 (46.8)	October 19, 1848		●	●	●	Short Line Bus: 17
NY	14	Suffern	Suffern	30.5 (49.1)	June 30, 1841		●	●	●	Transport of Rockland: 59, 93, Monsey Loop 3, Hudson Link; Short Line Bus: 17M/MD/SF

== Bibliography ==
- Clayton, W. Woodford (1882). History of Bergen and Passaic Counties, New Jersey: With Biographical Sketches of Many of Its Pioneers and Prominent Men. Philadelphia, Pennsylvania: Everts & Peck.
- Lucas, Walter Arndt (1944). From the Hills to the Hudson: A History of the Paterson and Hudson River Rail Road and its Associates, the Paterson and Ramapo, and the Union Railroads. New York, New York: The Cornwall Press. hdl:2027/uc1.b4536228.
- Mott, Edward Harold (1899). Between the Ocean and the Lakes: The Story of Erie. New York, New York: John S. Collins.
- Poor, Henry Varnum (1884). Poor's Manual of Railroads. Pittsburgh, Pennsylvania: H.V. & H.W. Poor.
- Van Valen, James M. (1900). History of Bergen County, New Jersey. New York, New York: New Jersey Publishing and Engraving Company.
- Wardell, Patricia Webb (1994). Allendale: Background of a Borough. Allendale, New Jersey: Allendale Historical Society. Archived from the original on August 16, 2017.
- Citizens Semi-Centennial Association (1916). Ridgewood, Bergen County, New Jersey, Past and Present. Ridgewood, New Jersey: Citizens Semi-Centennial Association.
