= Ridgewood station =

Railroad station in New Jersey, U.S.

Ridgewood
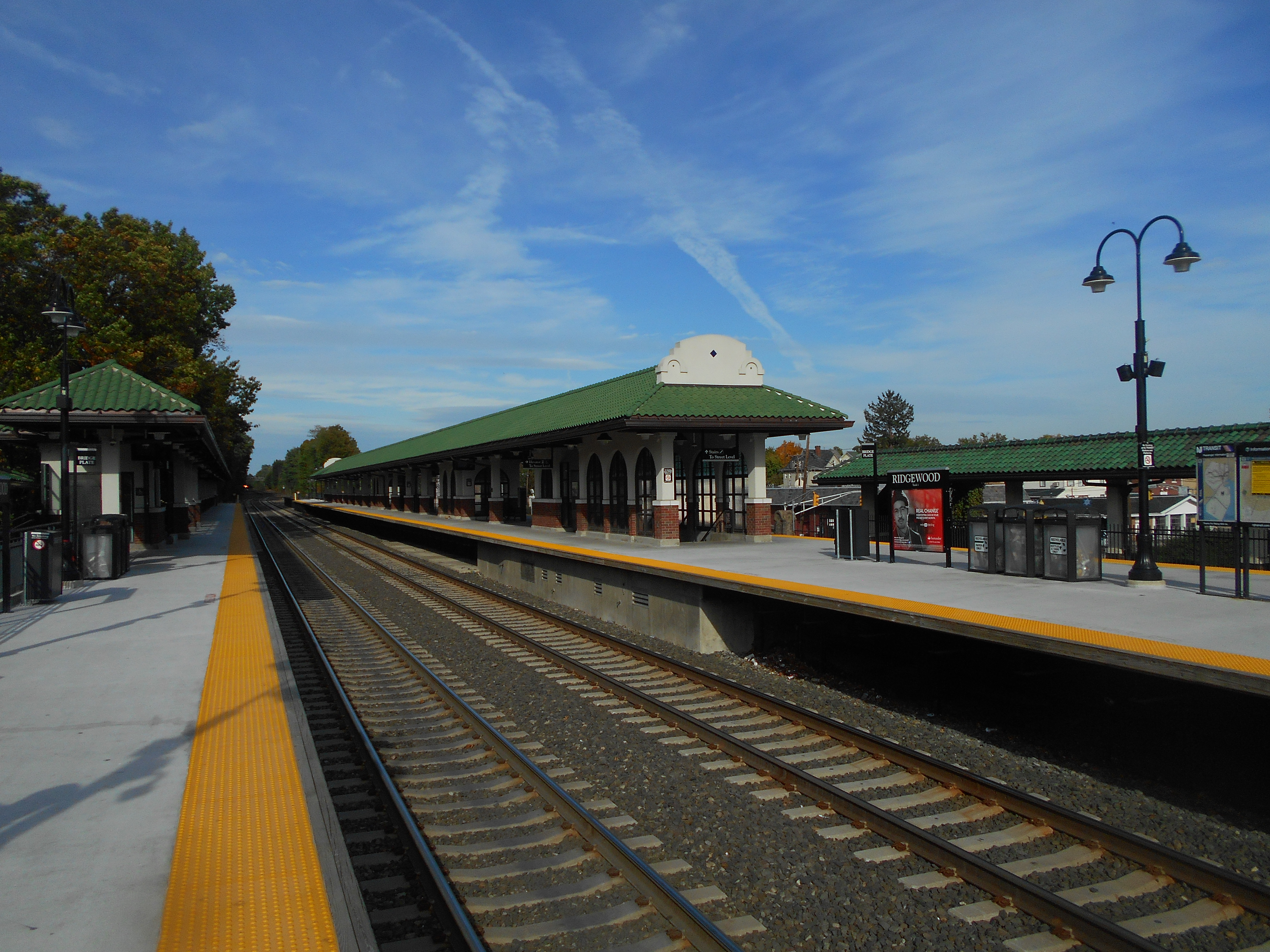
- Ridgewood station in October 2014 from the Hoboken-bound platform.

General information
- Coordinates: 40.9807°N 74.1205°W
- Owner: New Jersey Transit
- Platforms: 1 side platform, 1 island platform
- Tracks: 3
- Connections: NJT Bus 163, 164, 175, 722, 746, 752 (all connections two blocks away at Van Neste Square; several of those routes have connections at the station on Godwin Avenue)

Construction
- Parking: Yes
- Cycle facilities: Yes
- Accessible: yes

Other information
- Station code: 2315 (Erie Railroad)
- Fare zone: 9

History
- Opened: October 19, 1848
- Rebuilt: 1859; August 1915–November 28, 1916; February 2009–September 2011
- Former names: Godwinville (1848–1866)

Passengers
- 2025: 1,228 (average weekday)
- Rank: 26 of 153

Services
Preceding station	NJ Transit	Following station
Ho-Ho-Kus toward Suffern	Main Line	Glen Rock–Main Line toward Hoboken
Ho-Ho-Kus toward Suffern	Bergen County Line	Glen Rock–Boro Hall toward Hoboken
Former services
Preceding station	Erie Railroad	Following station
Ho-Ho-Kus toward Chicago	Main Line	Paterson toward Jersey City
through to Main Line	Main Line local stops	Glen Rock toward Jersey City
Terminus	Bergen County Railroad	Glen Rock-Bergen Line toward Jersey City
- Ridgewood Station
- U.S. National Register of Historic Places
- New Jersey Register of Historic Places
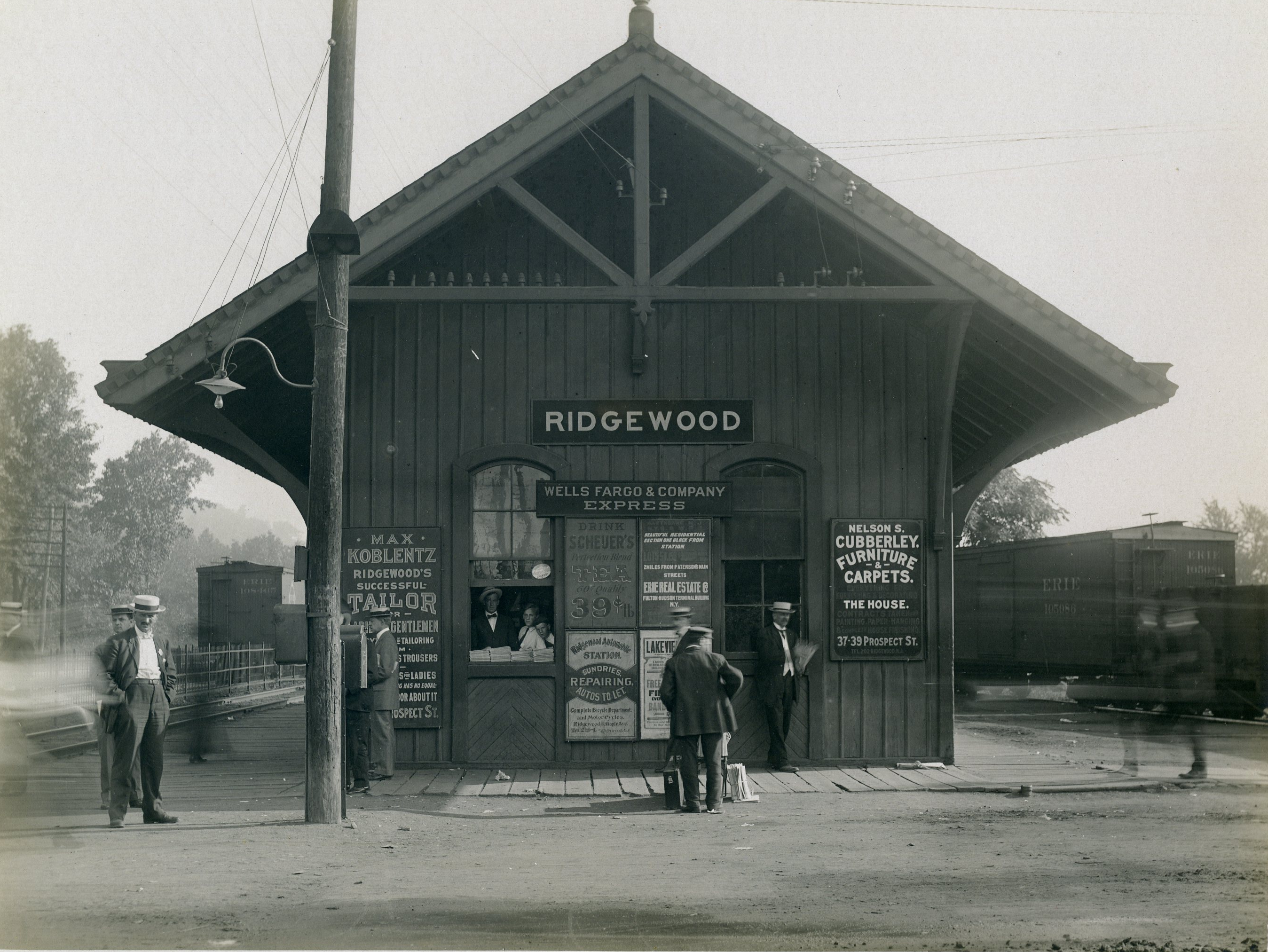
- The former Ridgewood station prior to reconstruction.
- Location: Garber Square, Ridgewood, New Jersey
- Coordinates: 40°58′51″N 74°7′16″W
- Area: 5.5 acres (2.2 ha)
- Built: 1916
- Architects: Drinker, W.W.; Howard, Frank A.
- Architectural style: Mission/Spanish Revival
- MPS: Operating Passenger Railroad Stations TR
- NRHP reference No.: 84002582
- NJRHP No.: 647

Significant dates
- Added to NRHP: June 22, 1984
- Designated NJRHP: March 17, 1984
Location

Ridgewood is a railroad station operated by New Jersey Transit in the village of Ridgewood, Bergen County, New Jersey, United States. A major transfer station, Ridgewood has two high-level platforms (one side platform and one island platform) for the Main Line and Bergen County Line.

== History ==
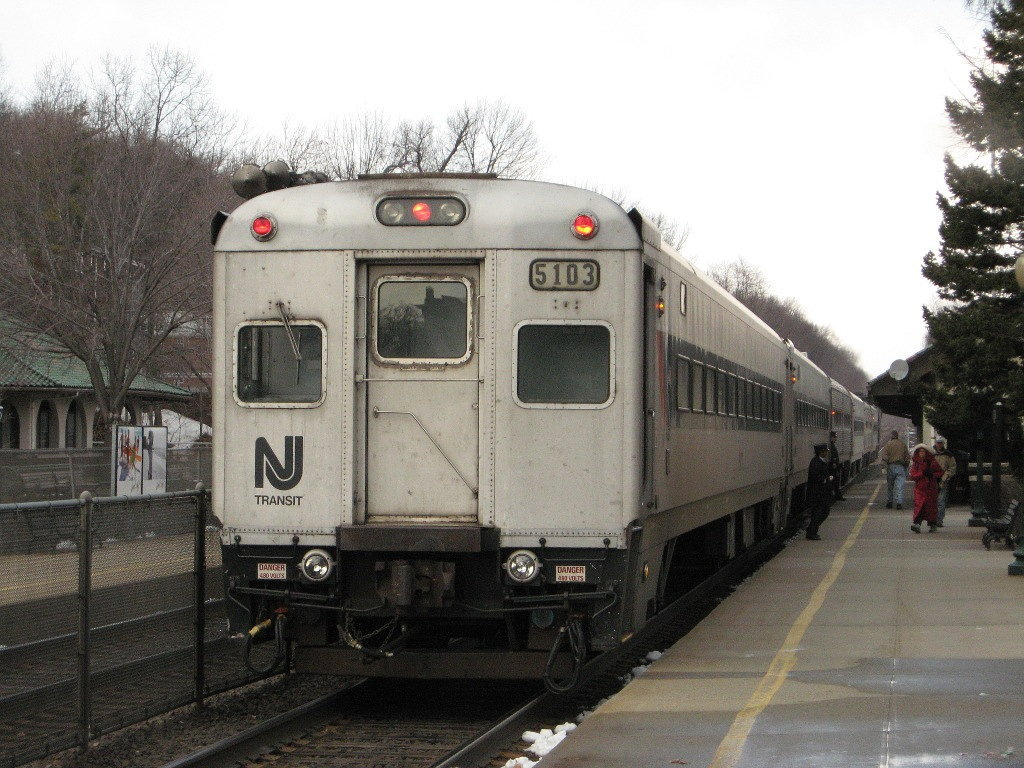
Train #75 stops at Ridgewood bound for Port Jervis before construction of the high-level platforms began

Service to the area known as Godwinville began on October 19, 1848, with the opening of the Paterson and Ramapo Railroad, a railroad connecting the Paterson and Hudson River Railroad at Paterson to the New York, Lake Erie and Western Railroad at Suffern. A new station was built in 1856, then in 1859. However, in August 1915, the Erie Railroad, now in control, started construction on a new pair of ornate station depots at Ridgewood, both of which opened on November 28, 1916.

The Erie Railroad built Ridgewood station in 1916 as a grade-separated elevated station. It has been listed in the New Jersey Register of Historic Places and National Register of Historic Places since 1984 and is part of the Operating Passenger Railroad Stations Thematic Resource.

Until the 1960s, the station served passengers heading to Binghamton and other cities, en route to Chicago or Buffalo. The Erie Limited and the Lake Cities served passengers heading toward Chicago. The station received eastbound passengers from the Atlantic Express. In final years of long-distance service, after the Erie's merger with the Lackawanna Railroad, unnamed trains ran to Binghamton, where passengers could switch to the Phoebe Snow after a layover. The discontinuing of the Phoebe Snow (1966) and the Atlantic Express (1965) marked the end of long-distance passenger service through Ridgewood.

Ridgewood station underwent a major renovation project between 2009 and 2011 to make the station compliant with the Americans with Disabilities Act of 1990. As part of the project, high-level platforms were installed and the side platform on Track 1 was demolished to allow for the installation of an island platform that would serve Tracks 1 and 3, and replace Track 3's side platform, which was fenced off. Ramps were installed on both platforms and elevators were installed to carry passengers from the platforms to the floor of the underpass on Franklin Avenue.

== Station layout ==
The station currently features two platforms, one side platform for service to Hoboken, and an island platform for service to points north. The two platforms are mostly high-level, while one low-level platform is no longer in use. Underpasses beneath the tracks and beneath a bridge on Franklin Avenue connect the two platforms.

== See also ==
- List of New Jersey Transit stations
- National Register of Historic Places listings in Bergen County, New Jersey

== Bibliography ==
- Van Valen, James M. (1900). History of Bergen County, New Jersey. New York, New York: New Jersey Publishing and Engraving Company.
- Citizens Semi-Centennial Association (1916). Ridgewood, Bergen County, New Jersey, Past and Present. Ridgewood, New Jersey: Citizens Semi-Centennial Association.
