= 2025 Southport shooting =

Mass shooting in North Carolina, U.S.

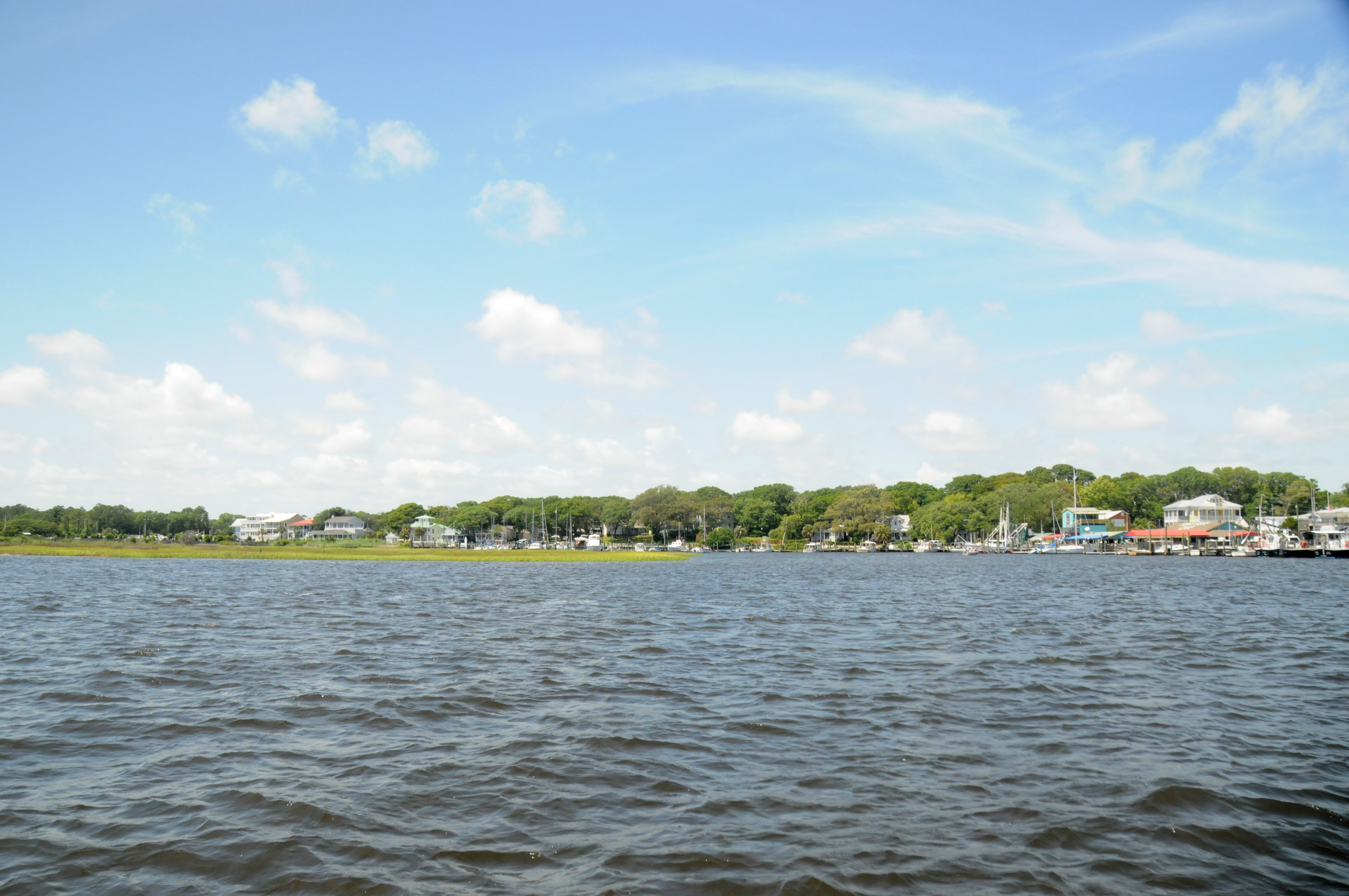
- The Intra Coastal Waterway in 2015, where the shooting occurred
- 1 Location of bar 2 Location of arrest
- Location: 33°54′56.5″N 78°1′22.3″W; American Fish Company; Southport, North Carolina, U.S.
- Date: September 27, 2025 c. 9:30 p.m. (EDT)
- Attack type: Mass shooting; mass murder
- Weapons: .300 Blackout short-barrelled SIG Sauer MCX Rattler rifle with suppressor; .45-caliber Kimber M1911 semi-automatic pistol (unused); .40-caliber Glock 27 semi-automatic pistol (unused; left in car); .380-caliber semi-automatic pistol (unused)
- Deaths: 3
- Injuries: 6
- Accused: Nigel Edge
- Charges: First-degree murder (x3); Attempted first-degree murder (x2); Assault with a deadly weapon with the intent to kill or inflict serious injury (x2); Discharging a firearm into an occupied property

On September 27, 2025, a mass shooting occurred at the American Fish Company in Southport, North Carolina, United States. A person is believed to have opened fire from a boat in the Intracoastal Waterway at the bar before speeding away. Three people were killed and an additional six were injured.

== Background ==
The American Fish Company is located within the Yacht Basin, a formerly operational harbor. Since then, however, the area has been converted into an entertainment district for the city with multiple eateries, a boat rental company, a tour company, and a seafood market located in the neighborhood.

The Yacht Basin is a major driver of tourism in the area, with over 850,000 visits over the 12 months leading up to the attack, according to compiled data. The city of Southport has also been used as a setting in the films Safe Haven and I Know What You Did Last Summer as well as the television series Dawson's Creek.

== Shooting ==
At around 9:30 p.m., a person on a boat coming up Cape Fear River opened fire on the American Fish Company bar during a concert, after anchoring at the bar. The person killed three people and injured six others before unanchoring and fleeing on the boat west up the Intracoastal Waterway.

Approximately four minutes after the first calls to police had come in, and a minute after the shooter had fled, the first officer arrived on the scene. Responding officers provided tourniquets and administered CPR to the victims. Seven minutes after the first call, emergency medical services and fire units were cleared to attend to the victims. A minute later, the United States Coast Guard was contacted and information about the suspect was relayed to them. First responders triaged the victims, including one victim who was suffering cardiac arrest, as police officers secured the scene.

Shortly after 10 p.m., the Coast Guard observed a person who matched the description of the shooter loading a boat at a public boat ramp in Oak Island to the west. The Coast Guard detained the suspect before handing them over to local police.

== Victims ==
Three people were killed and six others were injured, including one critically. Two of the victims were killed by shots to the head. Among the victims were vacationers from out of town.

The slain victims were identified as 64-year-old Joy Rogers of Southport, 36-year-old Solomon Banjo of Charlottesville, Virginia, and 56-year-old Michael Durbin of Galena, Ohio. Rogers and her husband were at the American Fish Company when shots were fired.

The injured victims included three residents of nearby Oak Island, one victim from Afton, Virginia, one victim from Amityville, New York, and one victim from Wheaton, Illinois. On October 3, the last injured victim was released from the hospital.

== Investigation ==
Assistant District Attorney Jenna Earley alleged that the shooting was originally planned to occur the day before as a boater found the suspect, Nigel Edge, with his boat anchored at American Fish Company with the lights off on that day.

Earley also alleged that Edge was found with a .380-caliber handgun in his waistband. Officials searched Edge's 2013 Nissan Xterra, which he was using to remove his boat from the water, and his 22 ft (6.7 m) Sea Hunt boat where they recovered more weaponry and items of interest; a .45-caliber Kimber M1911 semi-automatic pistol, a .40-caliber Glock 27 semi-automatic pistol, multiple rounds of handgun and rifle magazines and ammunition, an SD card, a self-published book, and a .300 Blackout short-barreled SIG Sauer MCX Rattler rifle. North Carolina State Bureau of Investigation director Roger "Chip" Hawley said that over 20 agents responded to the attack and elicited a confession from Edge.

Search warrants enacted at Edge's home in Oak Island in October recovered four more firearms (a Remington 700 rifle, a Colt revolver, a Ruger Gunsite Scout rifle, and a CMMG pistol with a suppressor), two iPhones, and a Lenovo V15 laptop. Officials also conducted a search warrant on Edge's Facebook data.

== Accused ==
The Southport Police Department arrested and charged 40-year-old Nigel Max Edge of Oak Island, after custody was passed to them by the Oak Island Police Department. Edge was imprisoned at Brunswick County Detention Center following his arrest.

Southport police chief Todd Coring described the attack as "highly premeditated" and said that the suspect acted alone. According to court records, Edge changed his name from Sean William Debevoise in 2023. Edge was born on October 23, 1984, in Suffern, New York, raised in nearby New City, New York, and graduated from Clarkstown High School North in 2003. Coring reported that Edge was a "self-described" combat veteran who served in the Marines from September 2003 to June 2009 and suffered from post-traumatic stress disorder. Edge obtained multiple awards during his service, including a Purple Heart, Marine Corps Good Conduct Medal, Combat Action Ribbon for Iraq and an Iraq Campaign Medal with two bronze stars.

In 2009, Edge filed for divorce from his wife. Ten years before the shooting, Edge confronted his former wife and accused her of hiring his platoon to kill him and claimed that they had shot him and then buried him and urinated on him. Edge also asked her if she remembered them being "sex trafficked" while they were in high school together and told her that his parents were not his real parents and instead that they had kidnapped him. In 2012, Edge escorted country music singer Kellie Pickler to the CMT Music Awards with his service dog Rusty while dressed in a Marine uniform. In February 2025, Edge filed a lawsuit against Pickler, in which he alleged she had poisoned his drink in an attempt to kill him, but he only survived because he didn't drink it.

In 2017, Star-News wrote a story about Edge, then known as Debevoise, in which they described him as a former Marine sniper who was shot four times in Iraq during the raid of an Al Zaidan warehouse on May 16, 2006. Edge also self-published a book in 2020 on Amazon titled Headshot: Betrayal of a Nation (Truth Hurts). In the book, Edge wrote that he had been shot four times, including one bullet in his head that partially pierced his brain and another which paralyzed his left leg, as a result of friendly fire.

In May 2025, Edge confronted a former classmate and friend at his workplace and accused him of stealing his identity. The former classmate and friend then filed a request for a protective order, in which he wrote that Edge "always has a pistol on him, on high doses of medications that cause defendant to be anxious." [sic] Edge then filed a lawsuit against his former wife, his former classmate and friend, an ex-girlfriend, and a former Marine from his first deployment to Iraq in which he claimed they were part of a conspiracy to sex traffic and kill him, or to make him die by suicide.

Oak Island police chief Charlie Morris said that Edge was known to police as someone who frequented the piers and that Edge had filed multiple lawsuits against the town of Oak Island and the police department over the years. Edge had also sued doctors and a health center, in the belief that they had forged his lab tests to cause "emotional distress" to him and lead him to die by suicide. In court documents, Edge also alleged that he was the victim of a "civil conspiracy" and had been trafficked by the LGBTQ community as "a weapon of mass destruction". The local district attorney, Jon David, stated that Edge had previous "minor contacts" with law enforcement before the attack, but nothing that would indicate that he was a risk of conducting such an attack.

About three weeks after the shooting, Edge filed a handwritten notice of appeal in response to a federal judge dismissing a civil rights lawsuit he had filed against the Federal Bureau of Investigation, the Department of Justice, multiple local law enforcement agencies, and a veteran's charity. In his appeal, he simply wrote: "Recent events, 'Self defense' against 'White Supremacist Pedophiles' directly related to this case." [sic]

== Legal proceedings ==
Nigel Edge was held without bond and appeared in court via video two days after the shooting and charged with three counts of first-degree murder, five counts of attempted first-degree murder and assault with deadly weapon with intent to kill or inflicting serious injury. The murder charges carry a maximum penalty of life in prison without possibility of parole, or the death penalty while the other charges carry a maximum penalty of over 41 years in an adult detention correctional facility. Although the last time a person was executed in North Carolina was nearly 20 years ago, district attorney Jon David said that his office was seeking "maximum justice" in the case and did not rule out pursuing the death penalty.

Edge had been scheduled to appear in court on October 13 for a hearing, but the appearance was postponed until the following month after his attorney was unable to attend due to a schedule conflict and successfully petitioned for a delay. A disposition hearing for Edge was scheduled for November 13. On that date, a joint motion was filed to continue the case on January 8, 2026. On January 8, a county judge's indictments against Edge for three counts of first-degree murder, two counts of attempted first-degree murder, two counts of assault with a deadly weapon with the intent to kill or inflict serious injury, and one count of discharging a firearm into an occupied property were filed.

Edge appeared in court for a Rule 24 hearing on February 6, a mandatory pretrial conference in capital cases in which the court determines if the state will seek the death penalty. He was seen walking with a limp and had a brace on his left leg. Edge's defense filed a motion in which they requested that Edge undergo a third competency evaluation before the court made "a decision of this magnitude". David said his office was surprised by the motion as he believed there was enough notice ahead of the hearing, but did not object to another evaluation. Edge had been evaluated twice before the hearing, and a doctor said he was "unlikely to regain competence"–in the state of North Carolina someone cannot be sentenced to death if they are mentally incompetent. On April 7, Edge was found not competent enough to stand trial and he was ordered by superior court judge Jason Disbrow to be sent to Cherry Hospital in Goldsboro after the state's mental health expert determined that Edge's competency could be "restored to capacity through appropriate treatment, including medication and counseling".

In April and July, Edge filed inmate grievances. In the second filing, Edge requested new legal representation, alleging that he was being intentionally neglected and denied medical care. Edge wrote: "I’m being denied obvious and simple care and my organs started to shut down to induce a heart attack. You are trying to murder me. I would prefer not to be a martyr for such a obvious malfunction of the system" [sic] and "This entire situation was caused by intentional negligence-incopetence, I have served honorably, and advised by you to take actions against my own will. This is imature and embarrassing the American people, forcing a previous handicapped victim to defend himself against his own will because the system failed and then torture him again". [sic]

On October 7, David announced following a Rule 24 hearing in the Brunswick County Superior Court that the state had made an "initial determination" to pursue the death penalty against Edge, but that it was "not a final decision". At the time of the announcement, Edge had not had his capacity restored, but David argued that Edge's inability to proceed with the trial and Edge's sanity at the time of the alleged crime were separate questions, and that he had been shown no evidence that Edge was insane at the time of the shooting. David said that his office had considered Edge's military service, traumatic brain injury, and history of severe mental illness before coming to the decision about the death penalty.

== Aftermath ==
The American Fish Company and Frying Pan, another local restaurant, closed until October 31 as a result of the attack, with initially limited hours upon reopening. Local businesses, non-profits, and places of worship made efforts to support the victims and survivors of the attack. A local nonprofit, Southport Cares, raised $242,237.26 in donations and distributed $232,595.82 to the 34 families and wounded patrons and employees who were affected by the shooting. The nonprofit also covered bank expenses and PayPal fees that were accrued during distribution. This number later rose to $346,223.35 with 77% of the funds immediately going to victims and their families and the remaining percentage going into a reserve for ongoing support for the victims. The Billy Graham Rapid Response Team sent eight chaplains to support residents of Southport and a vigil, which was attended by over 1,000 people, was hosted at Southport Baptist Church on September 28. Additional police officers from across Brunswick County were brought in to support security efforts.

On November 20, four officers of the Boiling Spring Lakes Police Department and a Southport Police Department officer received the Medal of Valor, the highest award offered to a police officer, for their quick response to the shooting and the aid they provided the victims. Southport police chief Todd Coring and Boiling Springs Lake police chief Kevin Smith said that the five officers entered the building, not knowing if there was still an active shooter, and applied tourniquets and gave CPR to the victims. Additionally, Smith gave his four officers Meritorious Service Awards and Coring gave their public information officer a Meritorious Service Award for effectively warning the public about the shooting. Later, on December 9, Coring awarded Smith with a Meritorious Service Award for his department's support in the aftermath of the shooting.

In May 2026, Brunswick County's 911 communications team was named the North Carolina National Emergency Number Association Communications Team of the Year for their response to the shooting at the North Carolina Public Safety Communications Conference in Wilmington. Officials said that the work of the communications team was vital to first responders' response in the aftermath of the shooting.

== Reactions ==
On September 28, North Carolina governor Josh Stein also visited Southport where he joined local law enforcement and leaders. Stein called for mental health reform and expressed support for a red flag gun law in a press conference after the shooting, stating, "There are people in our community who people know are a risk. A risk to others, a risk to themselves and they should not have firearms."

North Carolina House speaker Destin Hall criticized Stein just ahead of his press conference in Southport for not signing House Bill 307, "Iryna's Law", immediately after receiving it. The crime bill, which was created in response to a fatal August 2025 stabbing in Charlotte of a Ukrainian refugee, included a provision which would require Stein to endorse the resumption of executions in North Carolina, did not include red flag gun law measures, made it more likely for people to be imprisoned or institutionalized when accused of a crime, and did not provide funding for anti-crime mental health care. On October 3, Stein signed the crime bill, stating that the August 2025 stabbing and Southport shooting had raised safety concerns state-wide. However, Stein said after he signed the bill that there would not be a resumption of executions during his tenure as governor.

Southport mayor Rich Alt and local aldermen demanded that state and federal lawmakers pass legislation to improve and expand mental health services across the country. Some aldermen also supported the creation of red flag gun laws. Southport police chief Todd Coring praised the response of his officers, stating that they had arrived on scene within minutes of the first 911 call. Coring also urged unity and resilience in the aftermath of the attack and promised an increased police presence in the area where the shooting occurred. Coring's grandfather and father also served as Southport police chief in the past, and he described the shooting as the darkest night of his career and said that "I never would, [in] a million years, would have thought we’d have a shooter here in our waterfront district". Coring said he wasn't ready to give his opinion of red flag gun laws, but he said that it should be debated and that it "does make us angry that there’s only so much that we can do because, you know, then someone will say we’re violating their gun rights".

The day prior to the one-year anniversary of the shooting, local non-profit Southport Cares held a private dedication to support the families and survivors still undergoing treatment and therapy, and raised more than $350,000. On the day of the anniversary, approximately 75 Southport residents, survivors, family members, and first responders gathered together to dedicate four trees at Southport's Taylor Field Park to the victims. Three of the trees were dedicated to the deceased victims of the attack and the fourth was dedicated to the survivors, their families, first responders, and the community at large. After the dedication ceremony, attendees gathered at Southport Baptist Church for a prayer vigil. During the events, Southport mayor Joe Pat Hatem compared the shooting to the March 1942 sinking of the SS John D. Gill by a German U-boat off the North Carolina coast during World War II as an example of the city rallying together after tragedy.

== See also ==
- Crime in North Carolina
- List of mass shootings in the United States in 2025
- 2025 Grand Blanc Township church attack, which occurred 13 hours later
- 2025 Saint Helena Island shooting, another mass shooting at a bar which happened the following month
