= United States Post Office (Suffern, New York) =

- U.S. Post Office
- U.S. National Register of Historic Places
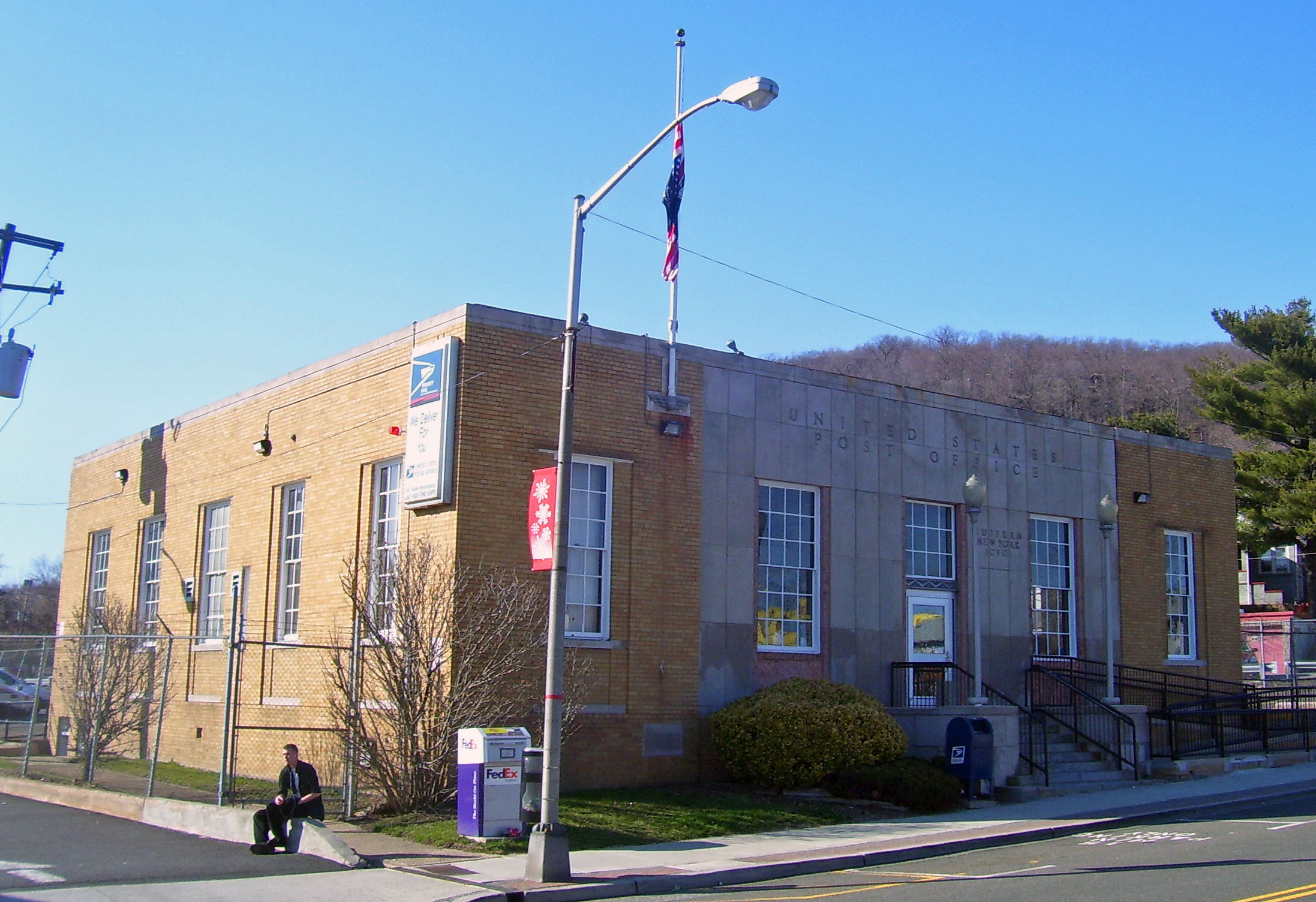
- Front elevation and south profile, 2008

- Location within New York Location within the United States
- Location: Suffern, NY
- Nearest city: Hackensack, NJ
- Coordinates: 41°06′59″N 74°09′07″W
- Area: less than one acre
- Built: 1936
- Architect: Louis Simon
- Architectural style: Colonial Revival, Streamline Moderne
- MPS: US Post Offices in New York State, 1858-1943, TR
- NRHP reference No.: 88002435
- Added to NRHP: May 11, 1989

The U.S. Post Office in Suffern, New York, is located on Chestnut Street between NY 59 and US 202, on the northern edge of the village's downtown business district. It serves the ZIP Code 10901, covering the village of Suffern.

It was built during the New Deal and reflects that era's architectural styles, combining elements of the Colonial Revival style preferred by the Treasury Department for new post offices in the early 20th century with the Streamline Moderne style predominating in the late 1930s. Its interior features a wall relief by Elliot Means, one of the many public artworks commissioned by the Section of Painting and Sculpture. It was added to the National Register of Historic Places in 1989.

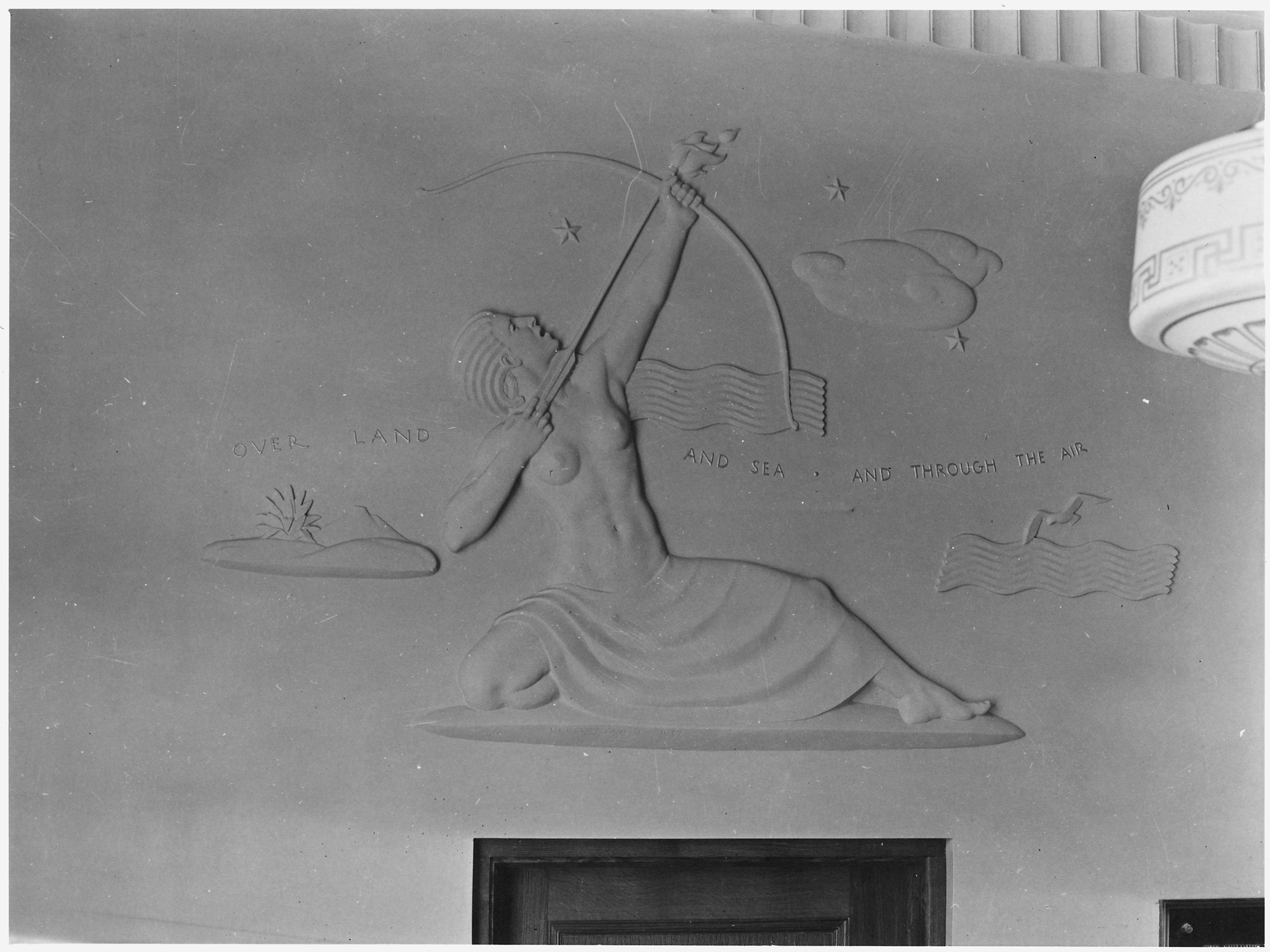
Wall relief by Elliott Means (1937)

== Building ==
The post office is a single-story, five-bay steel frame building with a buff brick exterior. It is square-shaped with a rear wing and flat roof.

The central three bays of the front façade are done in a symmetrical, vertical pattern of scalloped limestone, with some marble trim. Polished aluminum letters attached to the facade above the main entrance identify the building as a post office and its location. Some aluminum lampposts have been added since the building's construction.

Aluminum is also used for the doors and vestibule, leading on to the L-shaped lobby, almost intact from its original design. Ceramic tile is used for the flooring and dado to counter height. Vertical scalloping similar to that in the exterior is used on the plaster ceiling's molded cornice.

On the wall above the entrance to the postmaster's office is "Communication", a relief by sculptor Elliot Means. It depicts a partially clothed woman, surrounded by the moon, clouds, stars, mountains and waves, shooting a bow with flaming arrow.

== History ==
Suffern's first post office was established in 1797 by founding settler John Suffern, but fell into disuse a decade later. A village post office was formally reestablished in 1858 and used several rented spaces over the years. In 1931, the Treasury Department, which was then the Post Office's parent agency, got Congress to appropriate money for a standalone post office building in several New York communities, Suffern included.

The land was purchased for $20,000 in 1935. The next year, the post office was built for $90,000. Treasury Supervising Architect Louis Simon used an austere Colonial Revival design, demonstrated by the building's fenestration, brick facing and multi-paned sash windows. Variations on this basic design can be found in other New York post offices Simon built during this period.

But to a far greater degree than other post offices he built during this period elsewhere in the state, he incorporated more contemporary, Art Deco and Streamline Moderne elements, such as the expansive brick face, the use of aluminum in the transom, the limestone scalloping and the lack of exterior ornamentation or cornice otherwise. Only the post office in the Chemung County village of Waverly, almost an exact copy of Suffern's, uses this many modernistic elements.

Means' relief was added in 1937, and fluorescent lighting was installed in the lobby in 1965. There have been no major changes besides those to the building since it was opened.

== See also ==
- National Register of Historic Places listings in Rockland County, New York
