= Suffern, New York =

- Village
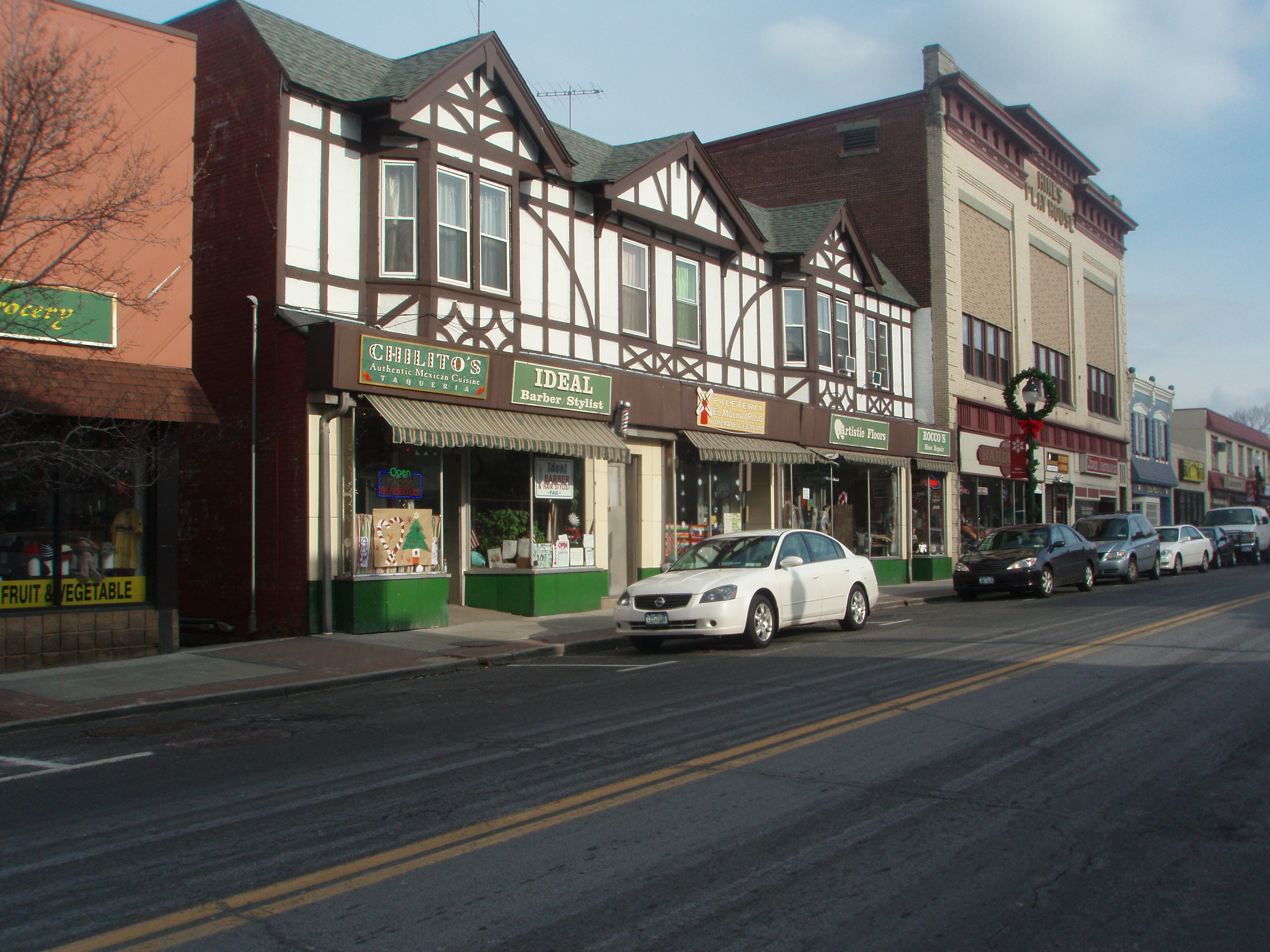
- Downtown Suffern

- Seal

- Location in Rockland County and the state of New York

- Location within the state of New York
- Coordinates: 41°6′43″N 74°8′45″W
- Country: United States
- State: New York
- County: Rockland
- Town: Ramapo
- Settled: 1773
- Incorporated: 1796

Government
  - Mayor: Michael Curley
  - Deputy mayor: Jo Meegan-Corrigan
  - Trustees: Steven Alpert, Angela Denis-Hogue, and Clarke Osborn

Area
  - Total: 2.13 sq mi (5.52 km^{2})
  - Land: 2.10 sq mi (5.43 km^{2})
  - Water: 0.031 sq mi (0.08 km^{2})
- Elevation: 312 ft (95 m)

Population (2020)
  - Total: 11,402
  - Density: 5,455.7/sq mi (2,106.45/km^{2})
- Time zone: UTC-5 (Eastern (EST))
  - Summer (DST): UTC-4 (EDT)
- ZIP Code: 10901
- Area code: 845
- FIPS code: 36-71894
- GNIS feature ID: 2391161
- Website: www.suffernny.gov

Suffern (/ˈsʌfərn/) is a village that was incorporated in 1796 in the town of Ramapo in Rockland County, New York. Located adjacent to the town of Mahwah, New Jersey, Suffern is located 31 miles (50 km) northwest of Manhattan. As of the 2020 census, Suffern's population was 11,402.

== History ==
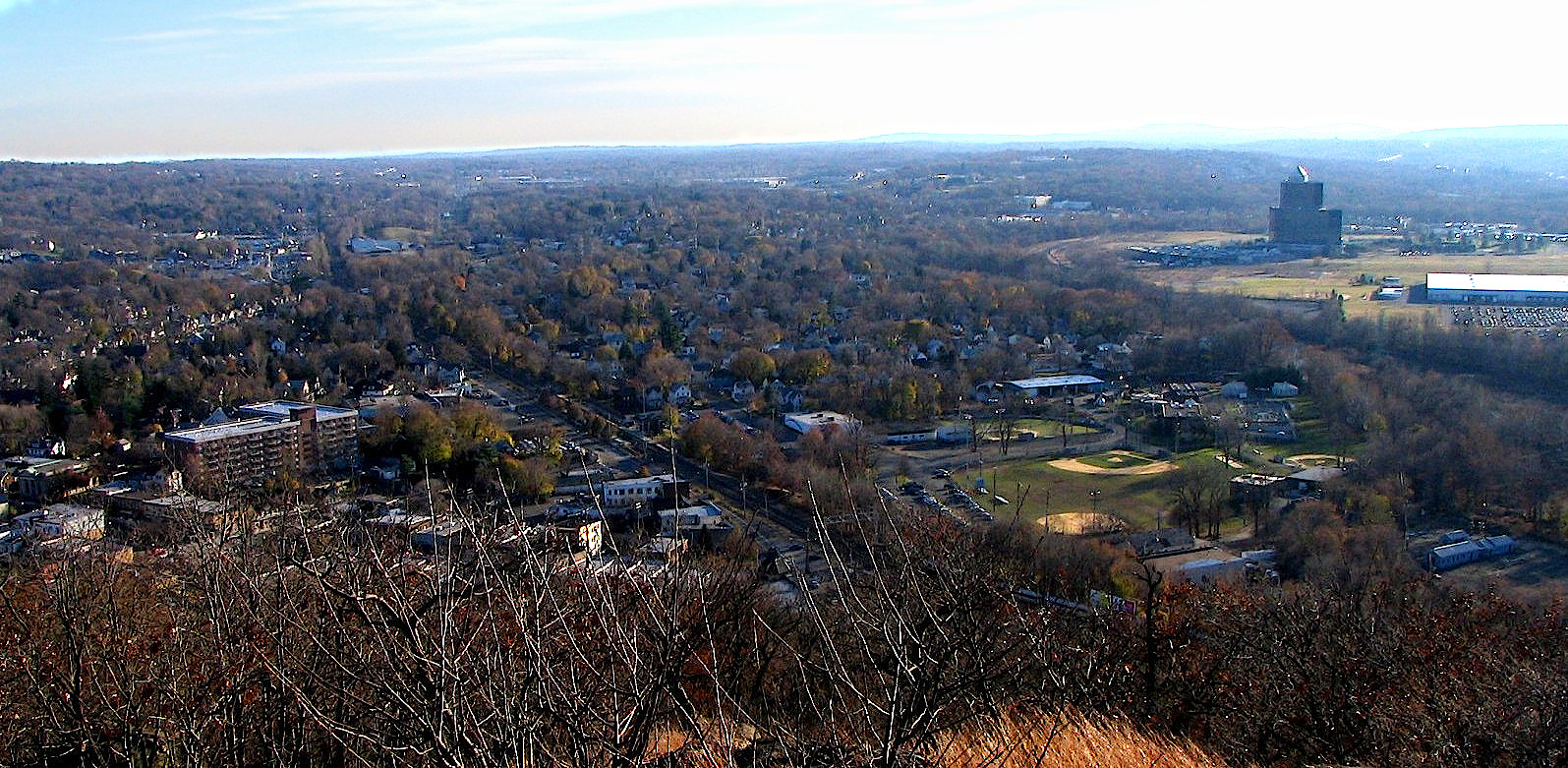
The village of Suffern viewed from the top of Nordkop Mountain

"The Point of the Mountains" or "Sidman's Clove" were names used before the American Revolution to designate the present village of Suffern. The area originally was inhabited by the Ramapough, a tribe of Munsee, who were a division of the Lenape tribe. Upon Sidman's death, this land passed into the hands of his son-in-law, John Smith, who sold it to John Suffern.

The village of Suffern was founded in 1796. John Suffern, first Rockland County judge, 1798–1806, settled near the base of the Ramapo Mountains in 1773, and called the place New Antrim, after his home in County Antrim, Ireland. His French Huguenot ancestors had settled there after fleeing religious persecution in France. New Antrim's location was considered strategically important in the Revolutionary War because it was at an important crossroads near Ramapo Pass. General George Washington and other important military leaders used John Suffern's home as headquarters when they were in the area.

This history has been recognized in the town. Suffern is a stop on the Washington–Rochambeau Revolutionary Route National Historic Trail, under the auspices of the National Park Service. This trail commemorates the route followed by General Washington and the French Comte de Rochambeau as they traveled to the siege of Yorktown, Virginia, which led to victory for the United States in gaining independence.

Rochambeau made encampment with his 5,000 soldiers in Suffern on August 25, 1781, on his way to Yorktown, and again on September 13, 1782, as he retraced his steps to New York. A historical marker on the Washington Avenue side of the Lafayette Theatre identifies this site of "Rochambeau's Encampment 1781–1782". The National Park Service has installed a wayside panel near the gazebo in Suffern to commemorate Rochambeau's encampment in Suffern. At the time of the encampment, this site was directly across the road from village founder John Suffern's home and tavern where the Count de Rochambeau stayed. Based on an 1860 painting of John Suffern's home that showed the well in the side yard, his home would have been in at the area of Licata Insurance. The well is in the basement of the furniture store.

During the war, General George Washington and his regiment made camp in the village several times. Lafayette Avenue, the main street of Suffern, is named in honor of Revolutionary War hero Marie-Joseph Paul Yves Roch Gilbert du Motier, better known as the Marquis de Lafayette.

Other guests who took advantage of Suffern's hospitality included Lieutenant Colonel Aaron Burr, who later became the third Vice President of the United States; General George Clinton, who became the first (and longest-serving) elected Governor of New York, as well as the fourth Vice President of the United States (under both Thomas Jefferson and James Madison); and Alexander Hamilton, first United States Secretary of the Treasury under President Washington.

From Suffern to Monroe was a main route of travel through the western Hudson Highlands. The main road was the Albany Post Road, one of the oldest roads in the state, which served as the stagecoach line between Albany and New York City. Once the Hudson River froze in winter, the Post Road was heavily traveled as an alternate. The 20 miles (32 km) of road through Ramapo Pass was later developed as the Orange Turnpike (now known as Route 17). Tolls were collected from 1800 until 1886 to maintain and improve the road. The New York State Thruway now runs through the pass. The south entrance to the town was garrisoned during the Revolution, with General Washington ordering as many as 400 soldiers to be stationed there at all times.

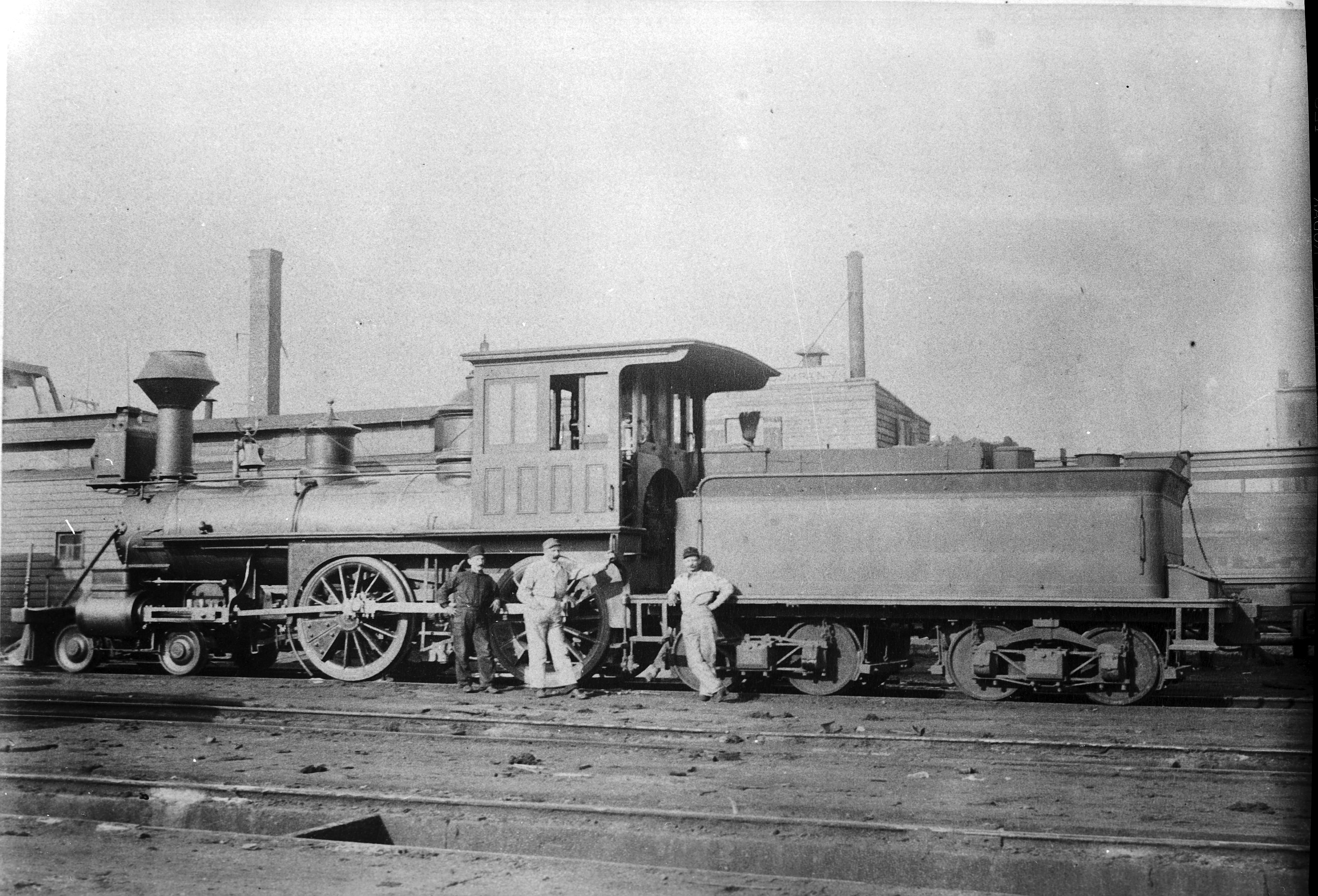
New York, Lake Erie & Western locomotive 171 at Suffern

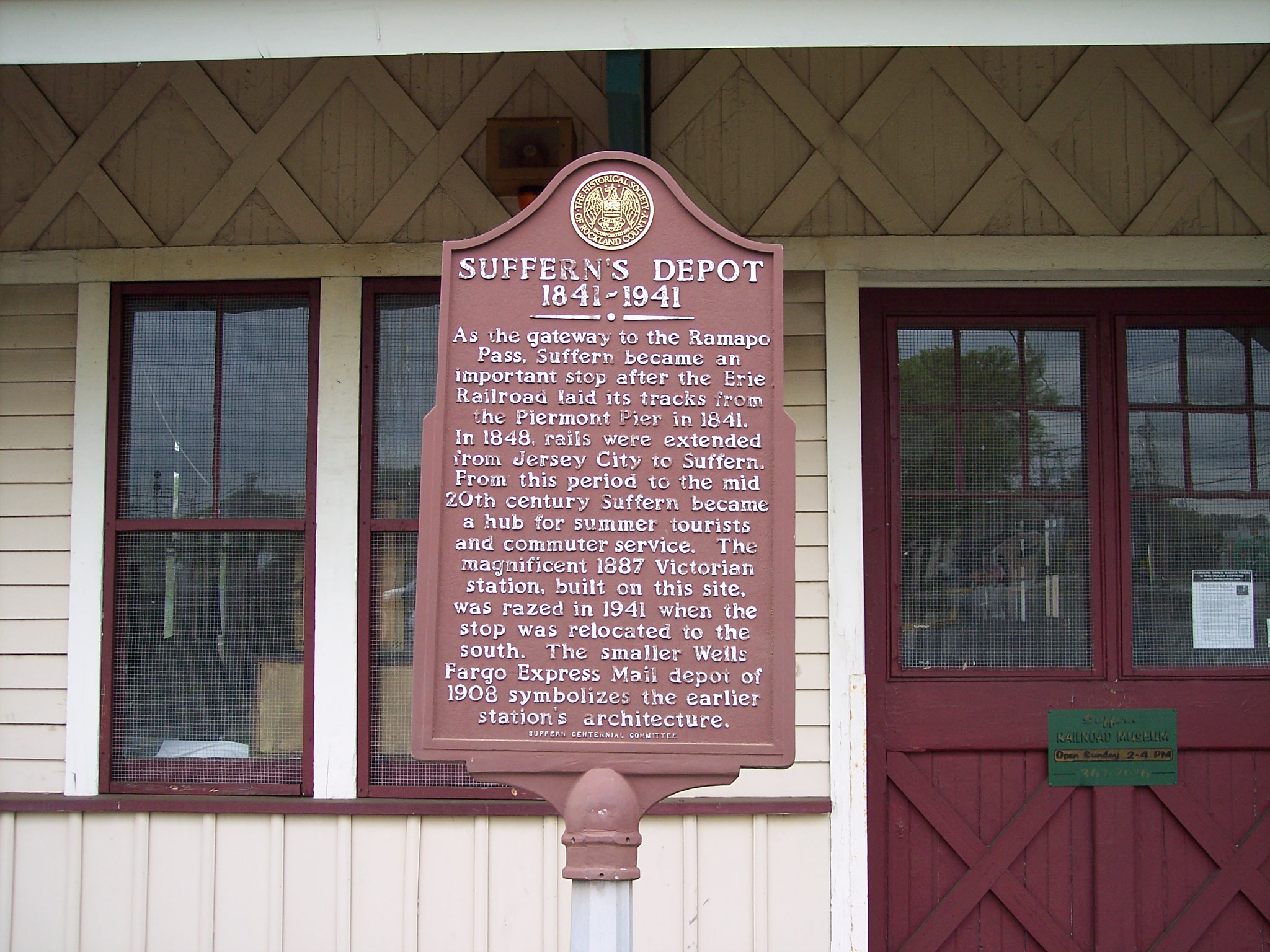
Historic Marker Suffern Rail Station

The first railroad line across Rockland County, the Erie Railroad, was built in 1841 and ran from Piermont to Ramapo. By 1851, the line was extended to Lake Erie, and was considered an engineering marvel. The tracks are now owned by the Norfolk Southern line. In consideration for the right-of-way given it by Judge Edward Suffern, son of founder John, to lay track across his 6 miles (10 km) of land, the Erie Railroad named their depot "Suffern's Station". The village became known as Suffern, not New Antrim, as it had been called by John Suffern.

In 1897, Avon Products, known then as California Perfume Company, built a 3,000-square-foot (280 m^{2}) laboratory in Suffern. By 1971, the lab had been expanded into the 323,000-square-foot (30,000 m^{2}) Avon Suffern Research and Development facility. In late 2005, construction was finished on a state-of-the art, 225,000-square-foot (20,900 m^{2}) facility that would become Avon's global hub for research and development. The new building was constructed on the same site as their previous R&D facility, which was demolished for site parking.

In 2023, Avon was sold to Regeneron Pharmaceuticals to be used for research and development laboratories.

In 1916, what would become New York State Route 59, which reached from Nyack to Spring Valley in 1915, was extended to Suffern and the Ramapo hamlet.

In 1924, the Lafayette Theatre, named for the Revolutionary War hero the Marquis de Lafayette, opened its doors.

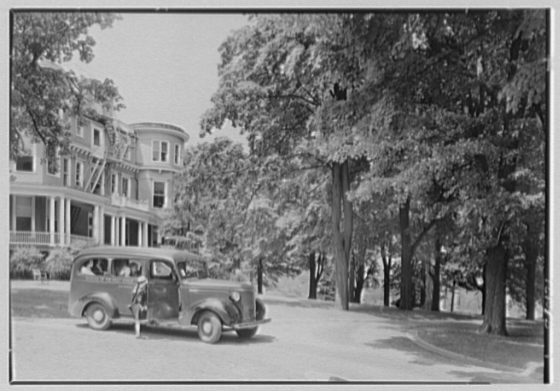
Holy Child School, Suffern, New York

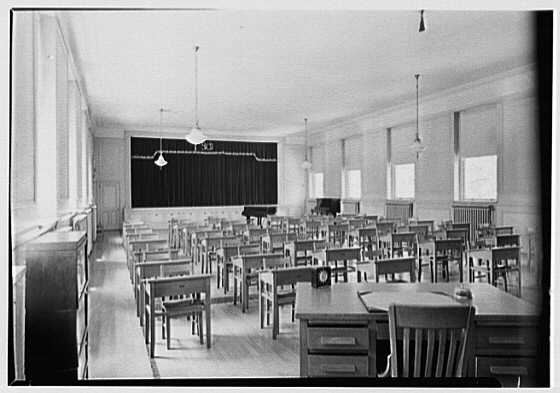
Holy Child School (interior)

In 1972, the Salvation Army's College for Officer Training was moved to a 30-acre (120,000 m^{2}) site in Suffern. This took over the former School of the Holy Child, a Catholic school for girls.

== Geography ==
According to the United States Census Bureau, the village has a total area of 2.1 square miles (5.4 km^{2}), of which 0.04 square miles (0.10 km^{2}), or 1.42%, is water.

Suffern is designated as a gateway to the Hudson River Valley National Heritage Area.

== Demographics ==
Historical population
Census	Pop.	Note	%±
1900	1,619		—
1910	2,663		64.5%
1920	3,154		18.4%
1930	3,757		19.1%
1940	3,768		0.3%
1950	4,010		6.4%
1960	5,094		27.0%
1970	8,273		62.4%
1980	10,794		30.5%
1990	11,055		2.4%
2000	11,006		−0.4%
2010	10,723		−2.6%
2020	11,441		6.7%
1900; 1910, 1920; 1930; 1940, 1950, 1960; 1970, 1980, 1990; 2000

=== 2020 census ===
As of the 2020 census, Suffern had a population of 11,441. The median age was 42.6 years. 19.8% of residents were under the age of 18 and 19.4% of residents were 65 years of age or older. For every 100 females there were 91.7 males, and for every 100 females age 18 and over there were 89.8 males age 18 and over.

100.0% of residents lived in urban areas, while 0.0% lived in rural areas.

There were 4,709 households in Suffern, of which 28.3% had children under the age of 18 living in them. Of all households, 42.1% were married-couple households, 19.7% were households with a male householder and no spouse or partner present, and 32.7% were households with a female householder and no spouse or partner present. About 34.4% of all households were made up of individuals and 16.8% had someone living alone who was 65 years of age or older.

There were 4,949 housing units, of which 4.8% were vacant. The homeowner vacancy rate was 2.5% and the rental vacancy rate was 3.4%.

Racial composition as of the 2020 census
Race	Number	Percentage
White	6,932	60.6%
Black or African American	899	7.9%
American Indian and Alaska Native	113	1.0%
Asian	741	6.5%
Native Hawaiian and Other Pacific Islander	7	0.1%
Some other race	1,546	13.5%
Two or more races	1,203	10.5%
Hispanic or Latino (of any race)	2,850	24.9%

=== 2000 census ===
As of the census of 2000, there were 11,006 people, 4,634 households, and 2,836 families residing in the village. The population density was 5,265.8 inhabitants per square mile (2,033.1/km^{2}). There were 4,762 housing units at an average density of 2,278.4 per square mile (879.7/km^{2}). The racial makeup of the village was 86.83% white, 3.53% African American, 0.26% Native American, 2.83% Asian, 0.09% Pacific Islander, 4.52% from other races, and 1.94% from two or more races. Hispanic or Latino of any race were 12.87% of the population.

There were 4,634 households, out of which 25.2% had children under the age of 18 living with them, 47.6% were married couples living together, 10.2% had a female householder with no husband present, and 38.8% were non-families. 32.5% of all households were made up of individuals, and 12.2% had someone living alone who was 65 years of age or older. The average household size was 2.36 and the average family size was 3.00.

In the village, the population was spread out, with 20.1% under the age of 18, 7.4% from 18 to 24, 32.9% from 25 to 44, 24.7% from 45 to 64, and 14.9% who were 65 years of age or older. The median age was 39 years. For every 100 females, there were 92.1 males. For every 100 females age 18 and over, there were 89.7 males.

The median income for a household in the village was $59,754, and the median income for a family was $74,937. Males had a median income of $46,959 versus $36,093 for females. The per capita income for the village was $29,208. About 3.5% of families and 5.7% of the population were below the poverty line, including 7.6% of those under age 18 and 6.4% of those age 65 or over.

== Economy ==
Novartis had a manufacturing facility in Suffern, employing approximately 525 workers. In January 2014, the company announced closure of this facility by 2017, citing loss of patent exclusivity on Diovan as a major factor in the decision. The facility was engaged in the "production of tablets, capsules, vials and inhalation products".

Avon's Global Research and Development facility is located in Suffern, employing 350 scientists and technicians in developing cosmetics.

== Arts and culture ==
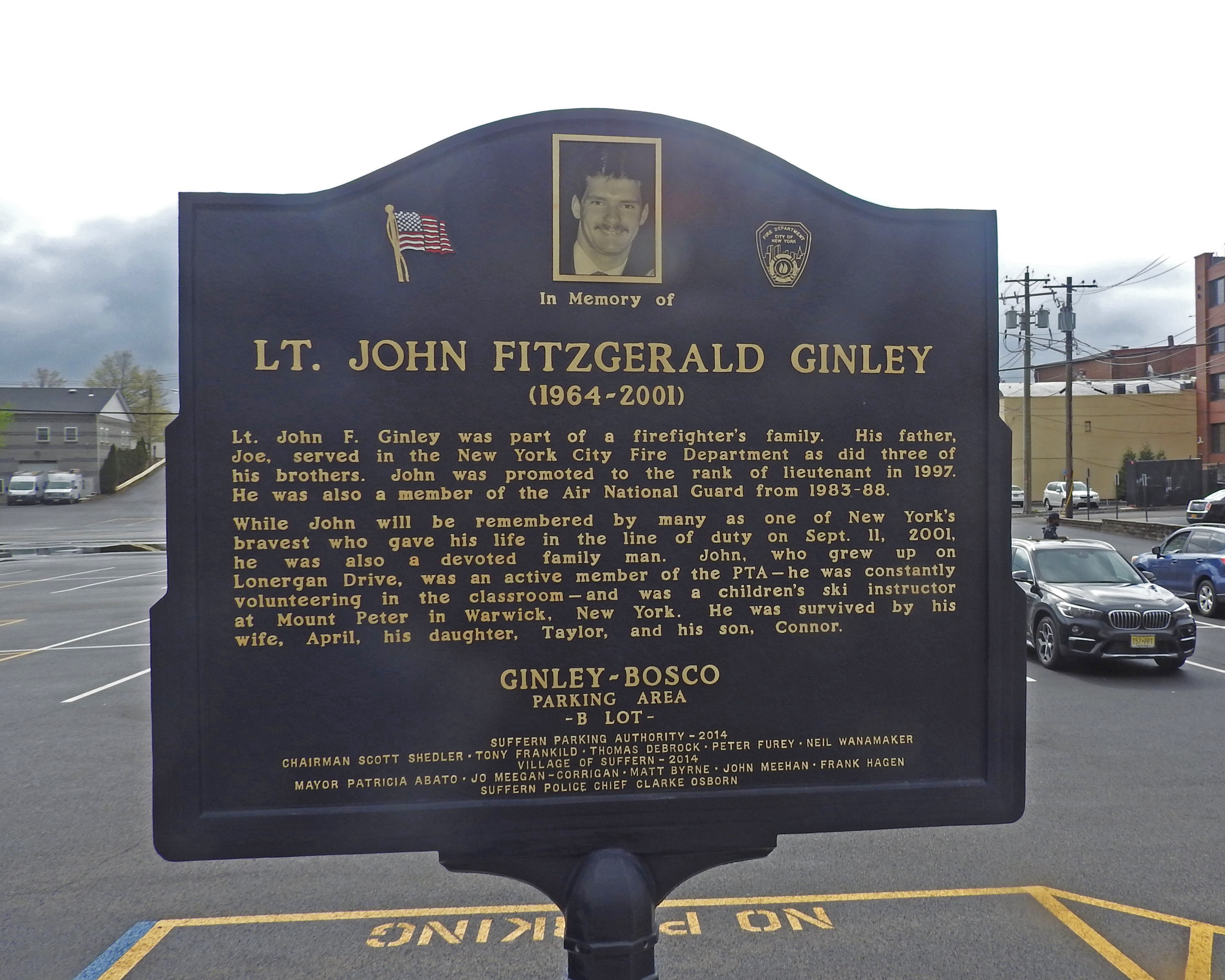
Lt. John Fitzgerald Ginley (1964–2001)

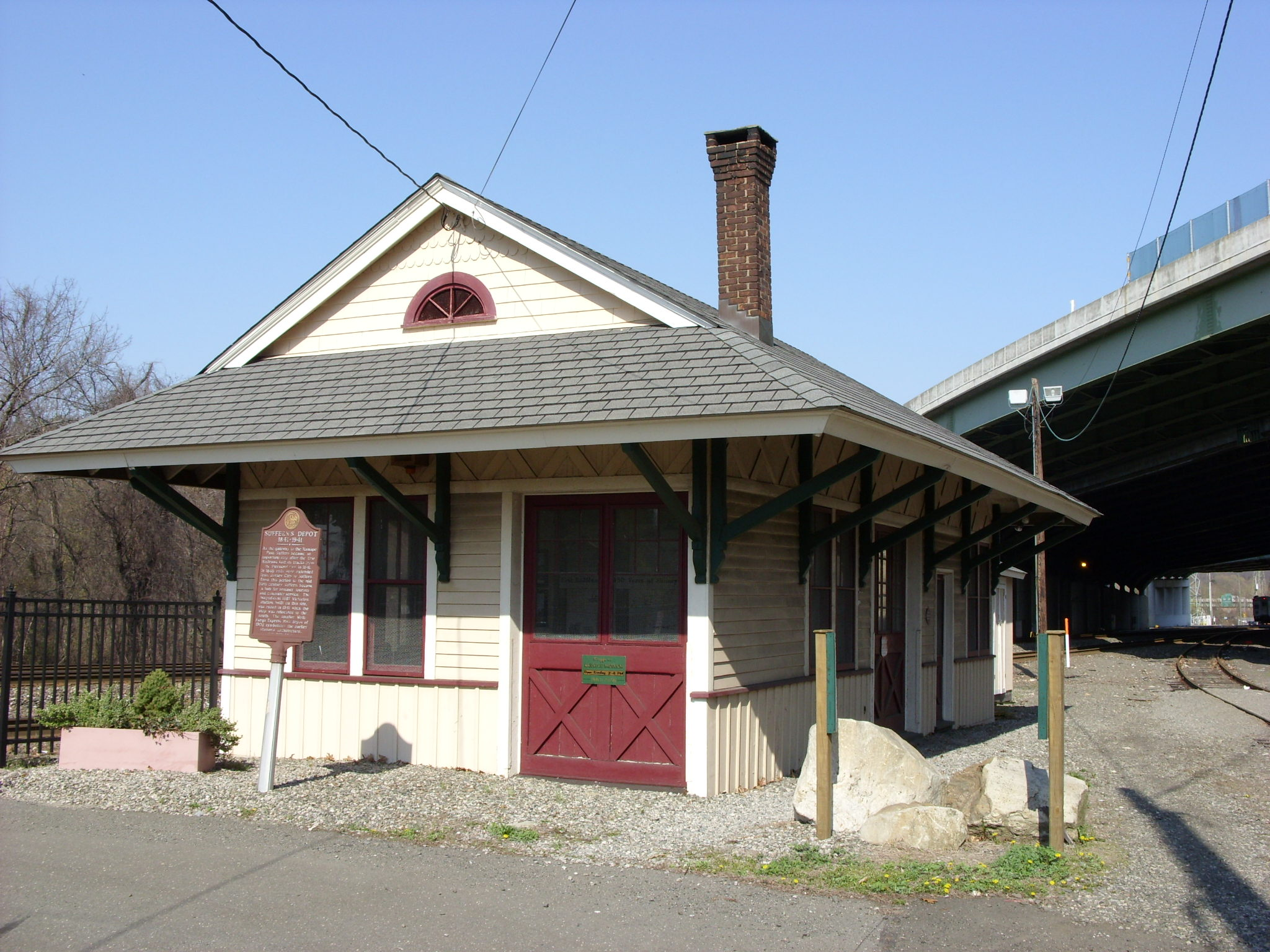
Suffern Piermont Branch Station

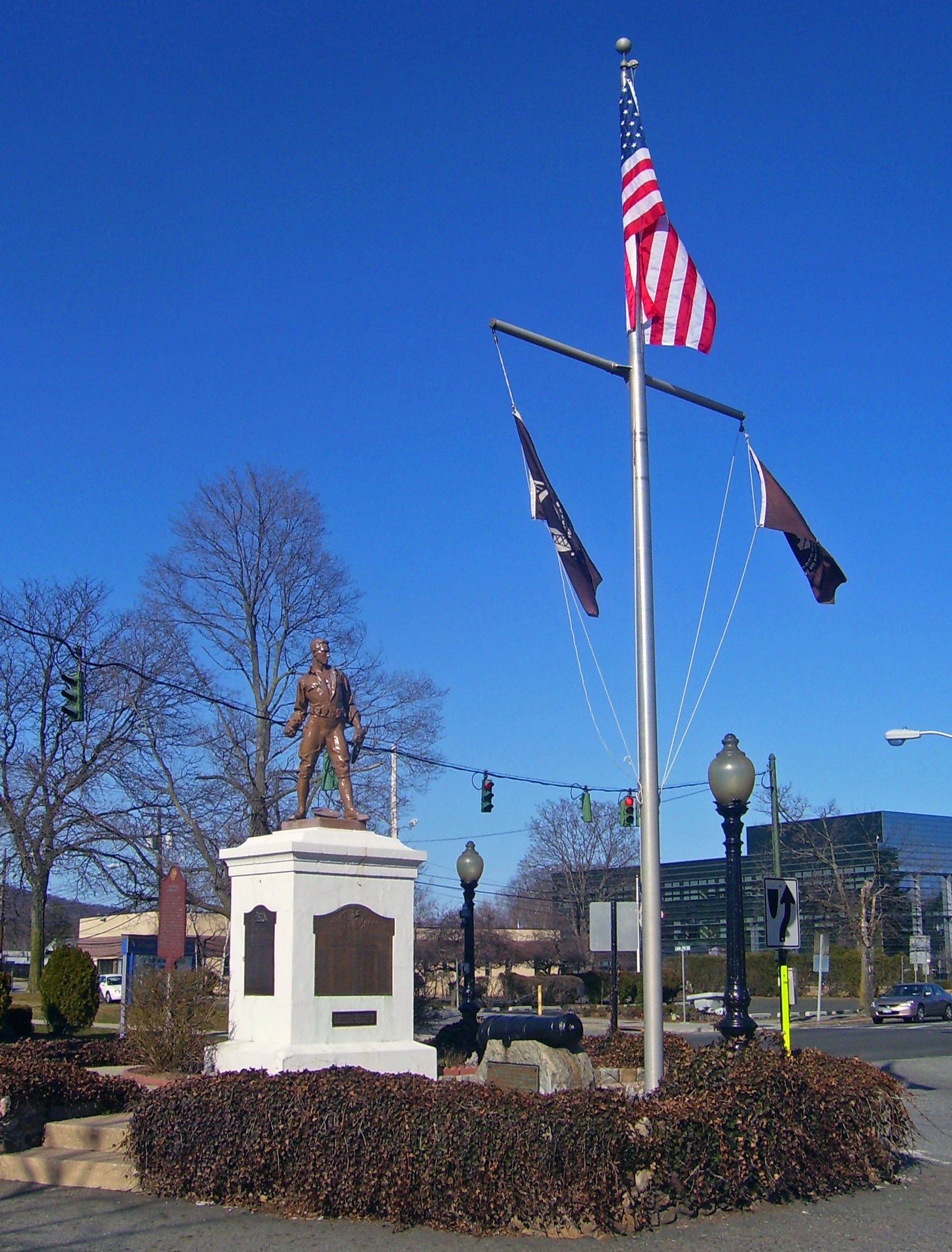
Soldier's Monument at Washington and Lafayette avenues

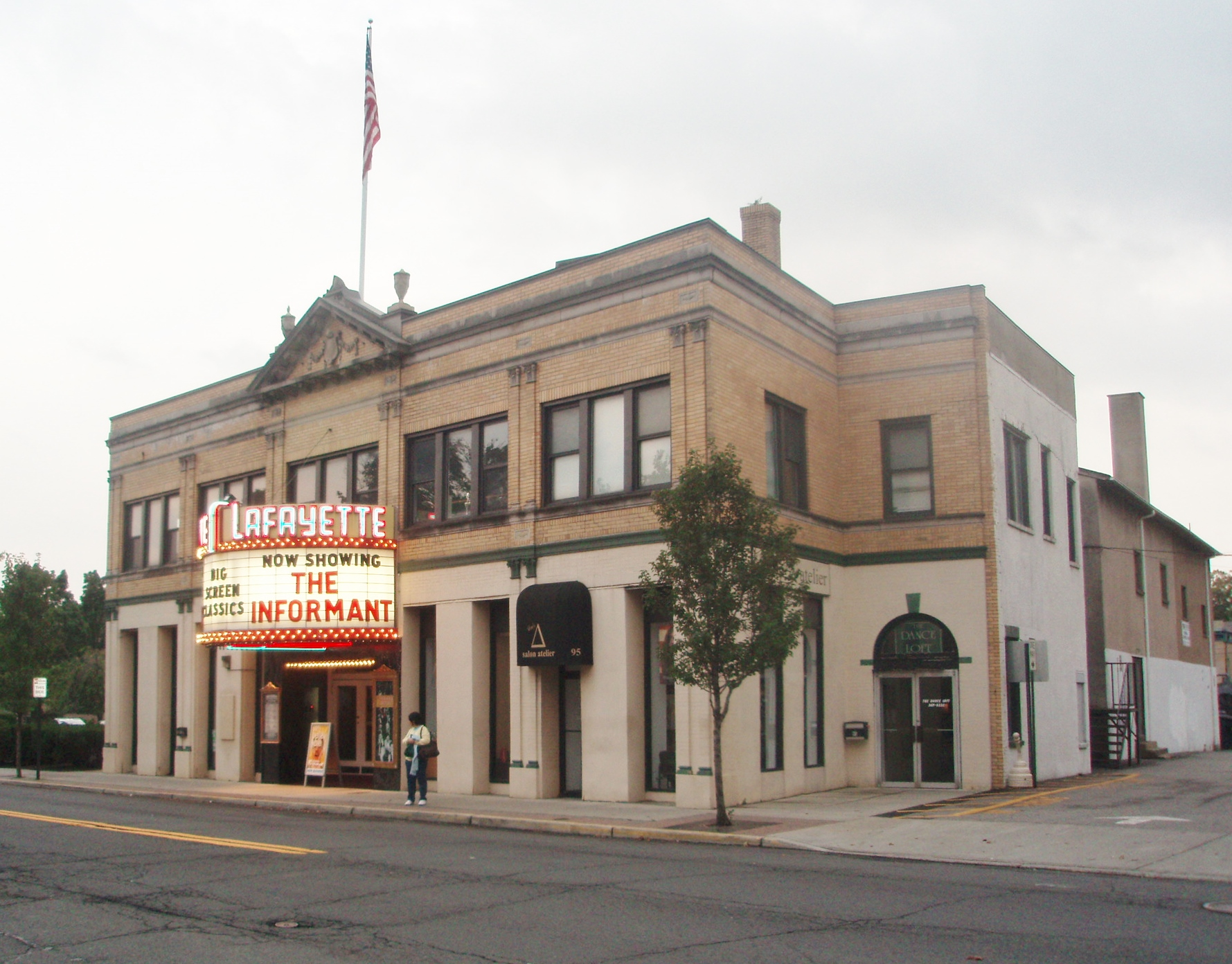
Lafayette Theater exterior

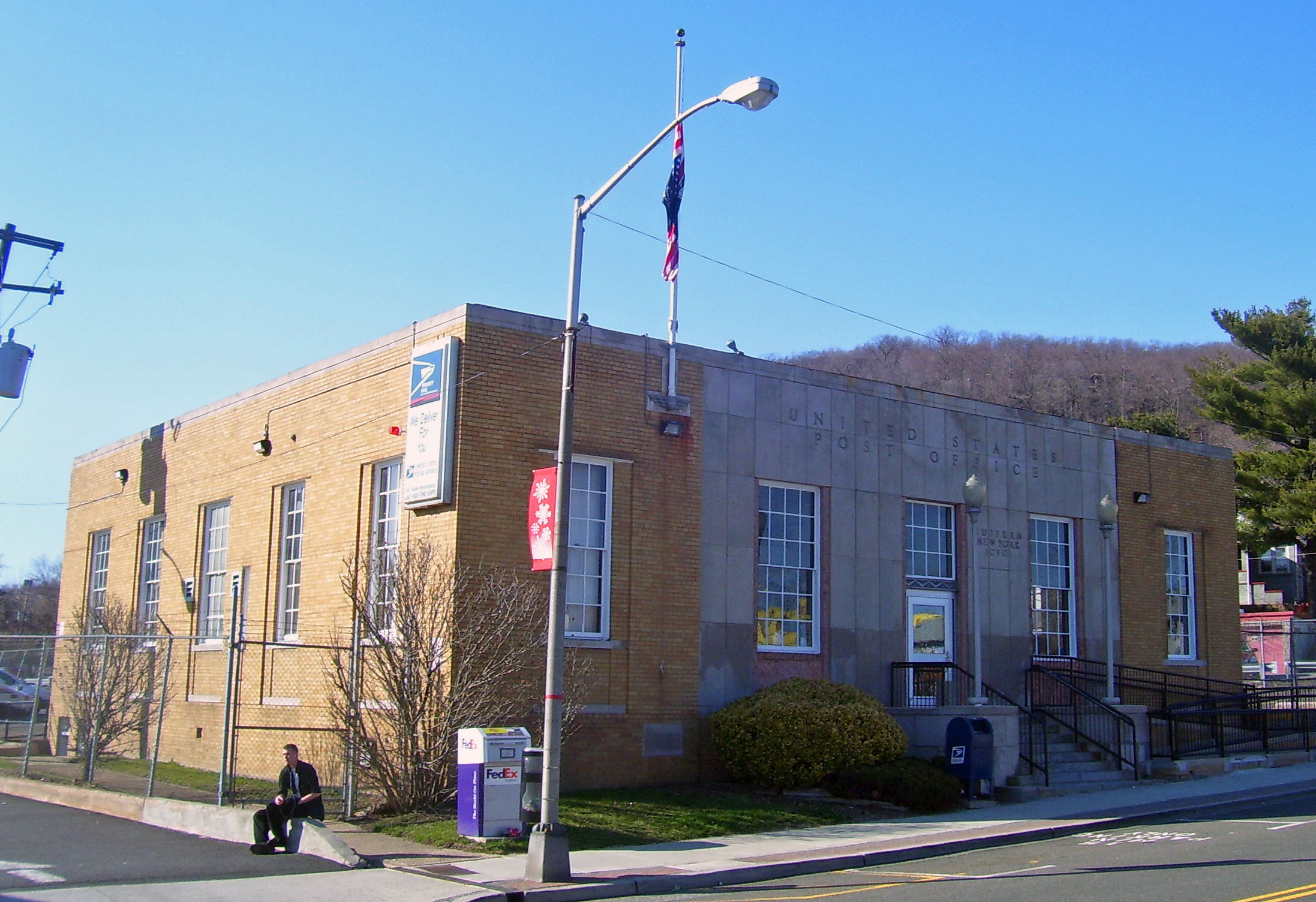
Post office

=== Historical markers ===
- Lt. John Fitzgerald Ginley (1964–2001)
- Rochambeau Encampment, Lafayette and Washington avenues
- Soldier's Monument, also known as Washington Ave. Monument, Washington and Lafayette avenues (NRHP)
- Suffern's Depot, 1 Erie Plaza
- Suffern Grammar School, 41 Wayne Avenue
- Suffern's Sacred Heart Parish, 129 Lafayette Avenue
- Suffern's Tavern site, Washington and Lafayette avenues – Suffern's tavern sheltered many Continental Army officers, including Gen. Washington and Aaron Burr, commander of the troops guarding the Ramapo Pass. Torn down c. 1856.

=== Landmarks and places of interest ===
- Brooklands Park – Lake Road – Site of Brooklands, home of Daniel Carter Beard, a founder of Boy Scouts of America.
- Hudson River Valley National Heritage Area – Suffern is a designated gateway to the HRVNHA.
- Lafayette Theatre – 97 Lafayette Avenue. Rockland's only surviving movie palace, opened in 1924, and having a renovated 1931 Wurlitzer pipe organ installed by the American Theatre Organ Society in 1992.
- Suffern Free Library – 210 Lafayette Avenue. The Ramapo Room contains historical books, clippings and photographs of western Ramapo.
- Suffern Railroad Museum – 1 Erie Plaza
- Suffern Village Museum – 61 Washington Avenue – Exhibits relating to the history of Suffern and the Ramapo area. Includes displays relating to American Indians, original Avon products, nearby iron mines, and Dan Beard, one of the founders of the Boy Scouts of America. Traveling Trunk program is available for classroom use.
- U.S. Post Office – Built during the New Deal, is located on Chestnut Street between NY 59 and US 202, on the northern edge of the village's downtown business district. (NRHP)
- Washington Avenue Soldier's Monument and Triangle – Washington Avenue (NRHP)
- Washington–Rochambeau Revolutionary Route Wayside Panel near gazebo

== Government ==
Suffern's government is headed by a mayor, Michael Curley. The mayor presides over a village board consisting of four trustees. The village is represented in the United States House of Representatives by Mike Lawler. In state government, it is represented by Senator Bill Weber and Assemblyman Karl Brabenec. Suffern is an incorporated village within the town of Ramapo, where Michael Specht serves as town supervisor.

== Education ==
Suffern Middle School is the junior high school of the Suffern Central School District (SCSD), and is located in the village Montebello, adjacent to Suffern. The 1,200 grade 6–8 students educated there hail from Airmont, Suffern, Montebello, Hillburn, Sloatsburg and parts of Monsey.

The village is home to Richard P. Connor Elementary School, also part of SCSD. Viola Elementary School is located in the neighboring CDP of Viola. High school students are zoned to Suffern High School.

In 2013, Cherry Lane Elementary School, located in the neighboring Village of Airmont and part of SCSD, became one of the Blue Ribbon School of Excellence Award winners awarded by the U.S. Department of Education.

Rockland Community College, part of the SUNY system, is located just outside the village limits.

== Media ==
- The Irishman was filmed in Suffern.
- Parts of Manifest were filmed near Soldier's Monument and the Lafayette Theatre.
- Suffern was the fictional setting for Aidan's country house in the HBO TV Show Sex And The City, Season 4, Episode 57, "Sex and the Country"
- Bo Burnham's Eighth Grade was filmed in Suffern.

== Infrastructure ==
=== Transportation ===
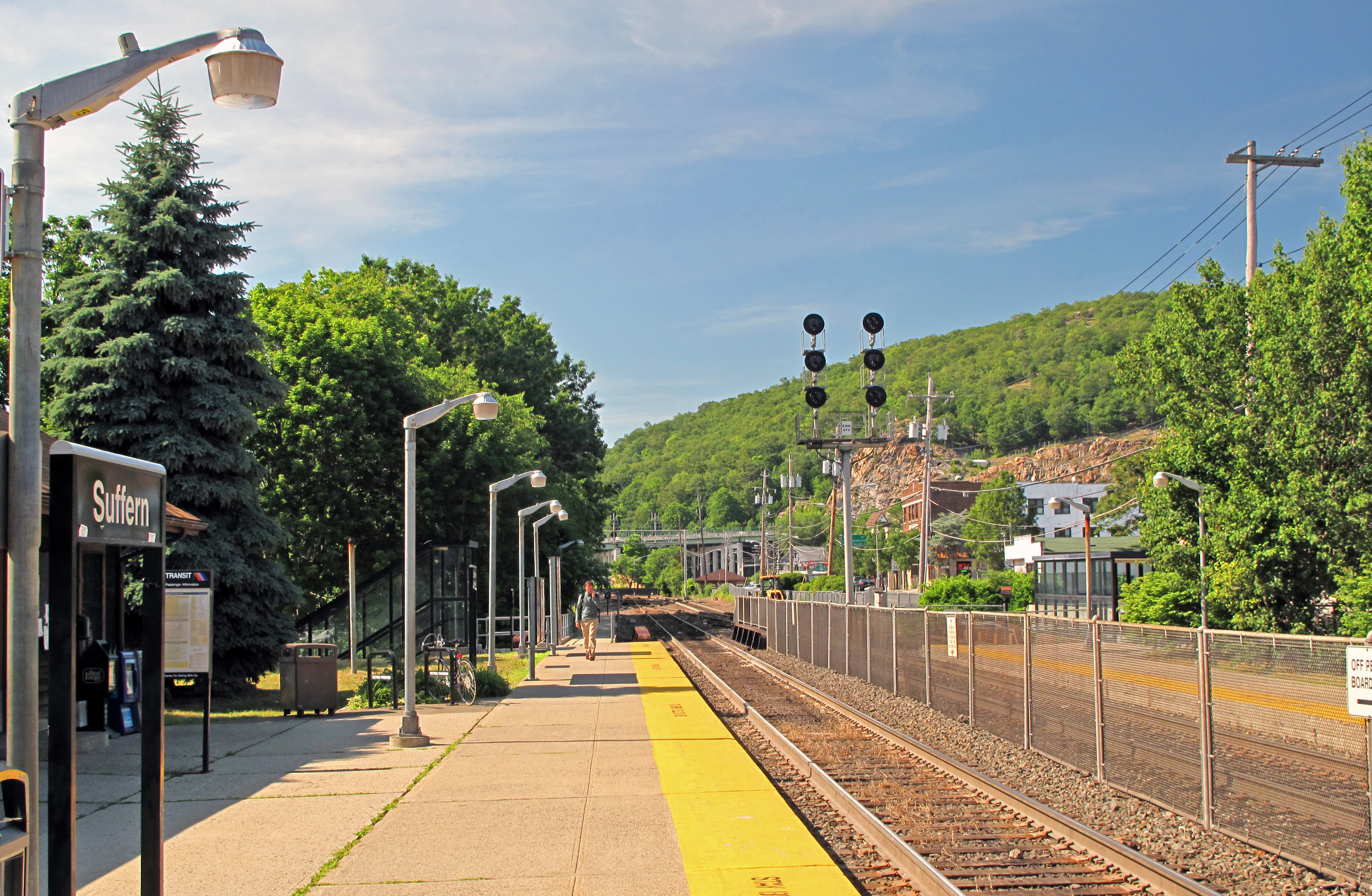
Suffern station

Suffern station serves both local and express trains, operated by New Jersey Transit to Hoboken Terminal with connecting service at Secaucus Junction to New York's Pennsylvania Station. Most New Jersey Transit Main Line trains terminate at Suffern; some Bergen County Line trains also terminate at Suffern; and Metro-North Railroad's Port Jervis Line trains continue into Orange County to Port Jervis. Transport of Rockland buses serve Suffern, as well as Hudson Link buses, and the Bergen County routes of Coach USA ShortLine.

U.S. Route 202, New York State Route 59, Interstate 287, and Interstate 87, also known as the New York State Thruway, go through Suffern.

== Notable people ==
- Nicholas Allard (born 1952), dean and president of Brooklyn Law School
- Christine Andreas (born 1951), singer and two-time Tony-nominated Broadway actress; credits include My Fair Lady, Oklahoma!, and On Your Toes
- Dave Annable (born 1979), actor, best known for playing the role of Justin Walker in ABC's Brothers & Sisters
- Daniel Carter Beard (1850–1941), a founder of Boy Scouts of America
- Jay Beckenstein, of jazz fusion group Spyro Gyra, built his recording studio, BearTracks Studios, in Suffern
- Christina Bianco, actress and viral video star
- Mike Bodker, mayor of Johns Creek, Georgia
- Ralph Borsodi, economist and social critic who moved to Suffern in 1920 and eventually founded the School of Living nearby
- Keith Bulluck, former NFL Pro Bowl middle linebacker
- Chris Caffery, guitarist for Savatage and Trans-Siberian Orchestra, also a solo artist and guest appearances with other bands.
- Otis H. Cutler (1866–1922), businessman and politician
- Will Cunnane, MLB pitcher for the Atlanta Braves, San Diego Padres, Milwaukee Brewers, and Chicago Cubs
- Tim Daly, actor, best known for TV sitcom Wings and TV drama Private Practice
- Tyne Daly, actress, best known for TV dramas Cagney & Lacey and Judging Amy
- Peter Daszak, British zoologist
- Tony DeFrancesco, former MLB interim manager with the Houston Astros
- Nigel Max Edge, former Iraq War veteran and perpetrator in the 2025 Southport shooting
- Charles E. Gannon, author and game designer
- Ryan Grant, former NFL running back
- Dan Gurewitch, comedy writer and actor, best known for CollegeHumor
- Valerie Harper, actress, best known for her role as Rhoda Morgenstern on The Mary Tyler Moore Show and its spin-off Rhoda
- Pat Hingle (1924–2009), actor
- Mike Lawler (born 1986), U.S. representative for New York
- Joe Lockhart, White House press secretary under President Bill Clinton
- Thomas Meehan, Tony Award-winning author of Annie and The Producers
- Jean Muir, actress
- Tommy Murphy, Major League Baseball player
- C.J. Nitkowski, left-handed pitcher who played for 10 Major League Baseball clubs
- Carole Radziwill, author, journalist, and star of Real Housewives of New York City
- Ida Mary Barry Ryan (1854–1917), philanthropist
- Margaret Salmon, award-winning filmmaker artist
- Claudio Sanchez, graphic novelist and lead singer-guitarist for Coheed and Cambria
- Marty Springstead (1937–2012), American League baseball umpire
- Grace VanderWaal (born 2004), 2016 winner of America's Got Talent
- Walt Weiss (born 1963), MLB shortstop, 1988 AL Rookie of the Year, and former manager of the Colorado Rockies
