= Washington Avenue Soldier's Monument and Triangle =

- Washington Avenue; Soldier's Monument and Triangle
- U.S. National Register of Historic Places
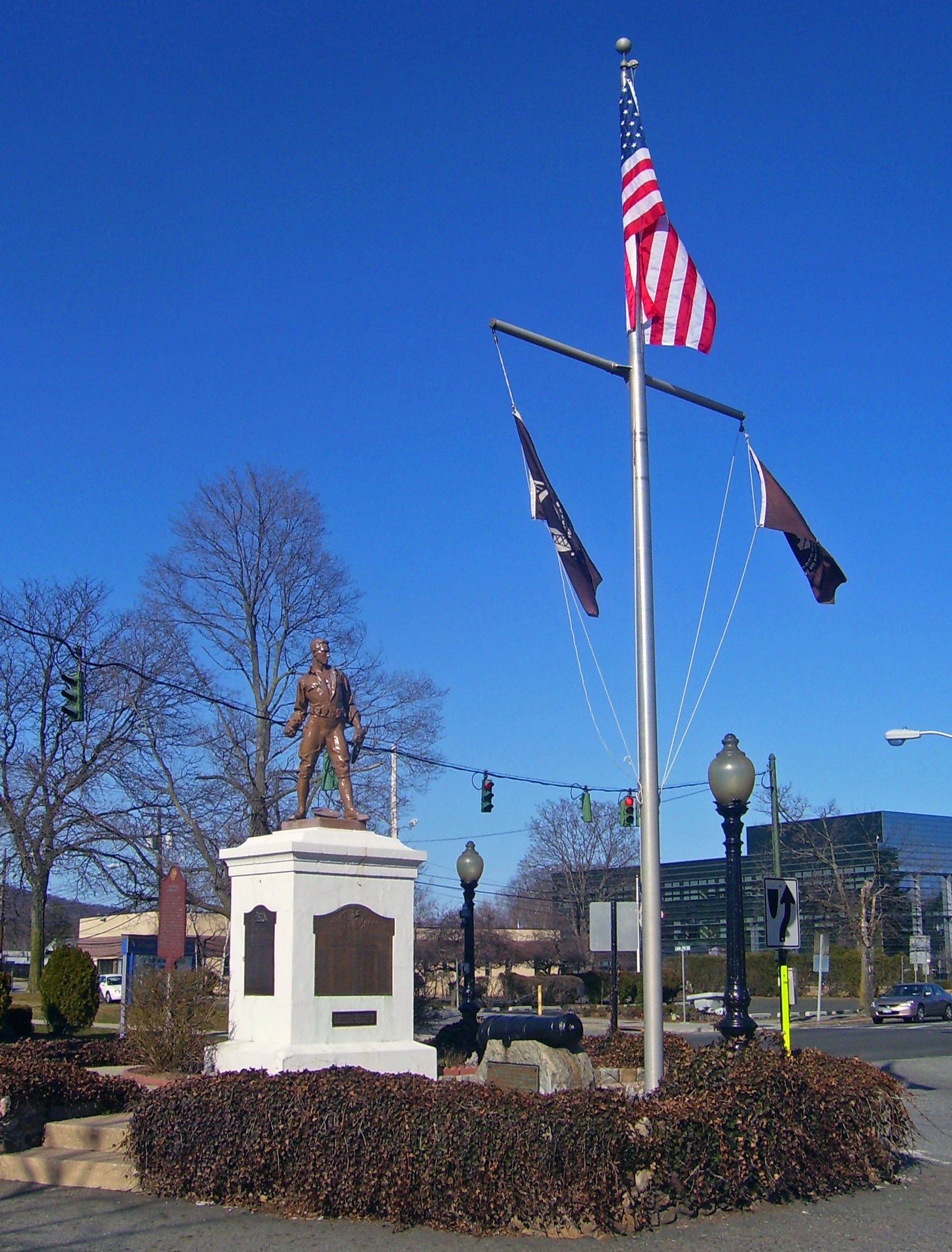
- Memorial in 2008
- Location: Suffern, NY
- Nearest city: Hackensack, NJ
- Coordinates: 41°06′53″N 74°08′58″W
- Area: less than one acre
- Built: 1908, 1921
- Architect: J.W. Fiske Iron Works
- NRHP reference No.: 06000646
- Added to NRHP: July 26, 2006

The Washington Avenue Soldier's Monument is located at the junction of that street and Lafayette Avenue (NY 59) in the village of Suffern, New York, United States. It sits on a small piece of land in the middle of the street known locally as the Triangle.

At different times during the Revolutionary War, George Washington and Rochambeau encamped the Continental Army near the memorial site for brief periods. A cannon from that war had been placed on the Triangle in 1908 with the intent of starting a memorial to the village's dead from the Civil War, but only after World War I was the monument finished and dedicated. Plaques have been added since then to honor those locally who served and sometimes gave their lives in World War II, Korea and Vietnam.

== Memorial ==
The two most prominent features of the memorial are a small cannon and a zinc statue of a doughboy. Both sit on a slightly elevated granite base.

Next to the stone bed of the cannon is a plaque stating that it was used in the Battle of Long Island in 1777. The doughboy is depicted in a heroic, defiant pose, with his shirt open and his helmet off, on the adjacent ground. Originally he was carrying a Springfield rifle with bayonet in his left hand; it has been replaced following the theft of the original. He stands atop a white pedestal, with plaques listing Suffern's dead from the different wars memorialized on each facet.

== History ==
The heirs of village founder John Suffern bought the cannon in 1851 and ritually fired it from the top of nearby Union Hill on Independence Day of every year, as well as for special events like the completion of the Erie Railroad across New York State in 1852. They donated the cannon to the village in 1908 to use as the latter saw fit, and the Village Board decided to place it on the Triangle. A local stonemason was paid $65 to build the granite platform, and the village granted a "perpetual privilege" to a local Union Army veterans' group to establish a memorial.

At the time, however, the village's mayor was unpopular, and one of the complaints against him was the establishment of the memorial, which his critics likened to a fort. Efforts to delay or outright cancel the memorial failed but delayed the completion and formal dedication of the project. Only after the United States had fought another war did interest in completing the memorial resurface, and in April 1921 the board authorized construction. The J.W. Fiske Iron Works of New York City cast a version of a statue it had erected elsewhere, in zinc (seen as a cheaper alternative to bronze). The focus on an ordinary soldier was part of a growing trend in war memorials of that era to shift emphasis from a commander or hero to the common man and woman on the line.

It was dedicated on Memorial Day of that year. The village has held its ceremonies for that holiday at the monument ever since. The only change to the memorial besides the additional plaques for wars later in the 20th century was the theft of the original rifle in 1968, possibly as an act of protest against the war in Vietnam. In 2006 the monument and Triangle were listed on the National Register of Historic Places.

== See also ==
- National Register of Historic Places listings in Rockland County, New York
