= Mike Bodker =

1st And Current Mayor of Johns Creek, Georgia

Michael Evan Bodker

1st Mayor of Johns Creek, Georgia

Personal details
- Born: 1966 (age 59–60) Suffern, New York
- Party: Republican
- Children: 3
- Education: University of Georgia (BBA)

Michael Evan Bodker (born 1966) was the mayor of Johns Creek, Georgia, a city that is a suburb of Atlanta with an estimated population in 2019 of 84,579. Bodker was Chairman of the Northeast Fulton Study Committee and Chairman of the Committee for Johns Creek, which organizations led the effort resulting in the incorporation of the new city of Johns Creek in 2006.

== Early life and education ==
Bodker was born in Suffern, New York, moved to the Metro-Atlanta area when he was five-years-old, and graduated from Lakeside High School. He then attended the University of Georgia where he earned a BBA in Accounting and was a member of the Delta Rho chapter of the Phi Kappa Theta fraternity.

== Career as mayor ==
Bodker became the first mayor of the newly created city of Johns Creek after running unopposed in the November 2006 election. He served as the 83rd president for the Georgia Municipal Association (GMA) from June 2015 through June 2016; as of 2021, continues to serve on the board of GMA; and was elected to the Georgia Municipal Hall of Fame. He also has served as the chairman of the Metro Atlanta Mayors Association, on the board of directors and Treasurer of the Atlanta Regional Commission, and as Vice Chair of the Tourism, Arts, Parks, and Entertainment & Sports Standing Committee of the U.S. Conference of Mayors.

== Personal life ==
Bodker was arrested in March 2020 on a misdemeanor battery charge for an alleged domestic incident regarding which charge Bodker said he would vigorously defend, the allegations by his estranged wife being that he grabbed her wrist and ankle causing visible redness, although the police report reads that there were no visible injuries when she talked to officers.

Preceded by Inaugural Mayor	Mayor of Johns Creek, Georgia; December 1, 2006 – 2022	Succeeded by John Bradberry
