= Al Zaidan =

Al-Zaidan
- Village
- الزيدان
- Interactive map of Al-Zaidan
- Country: Iraq
- Governorate: Baghdad

Population
  - Total: ~250

Al Zaidan or Zaidan is an agricultural village just west of Baghdad, Iraq.

During the US occupation Iraq, it was considered a hub of insurgent activity (especially by the 1920 Revolution Brigade) It is populated mainly by the Zobai tribe. The area also sends representatives to the Abu Ghraib district in Baghdad.

== Gallery ==
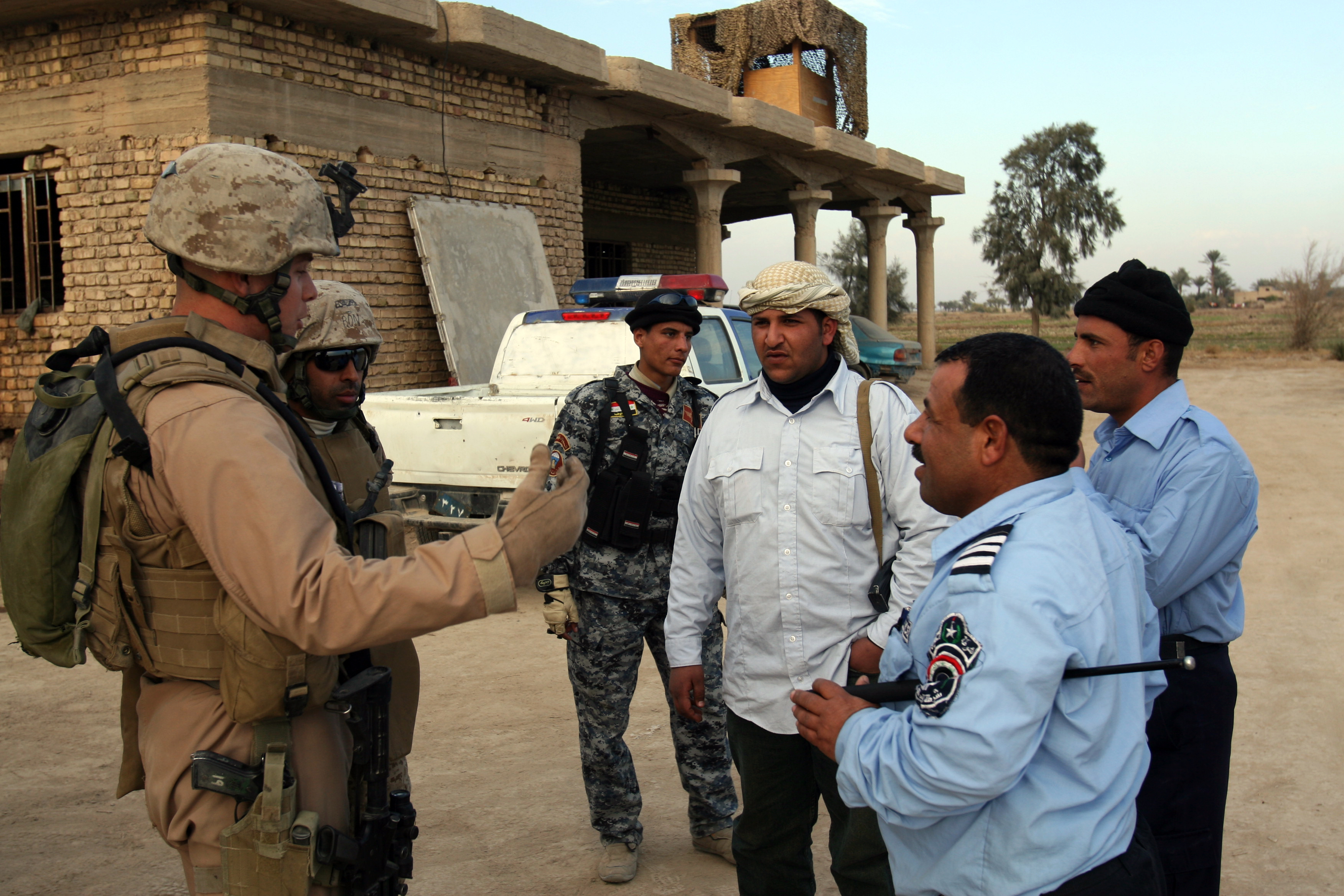
Iraqi police in Al Zaidan

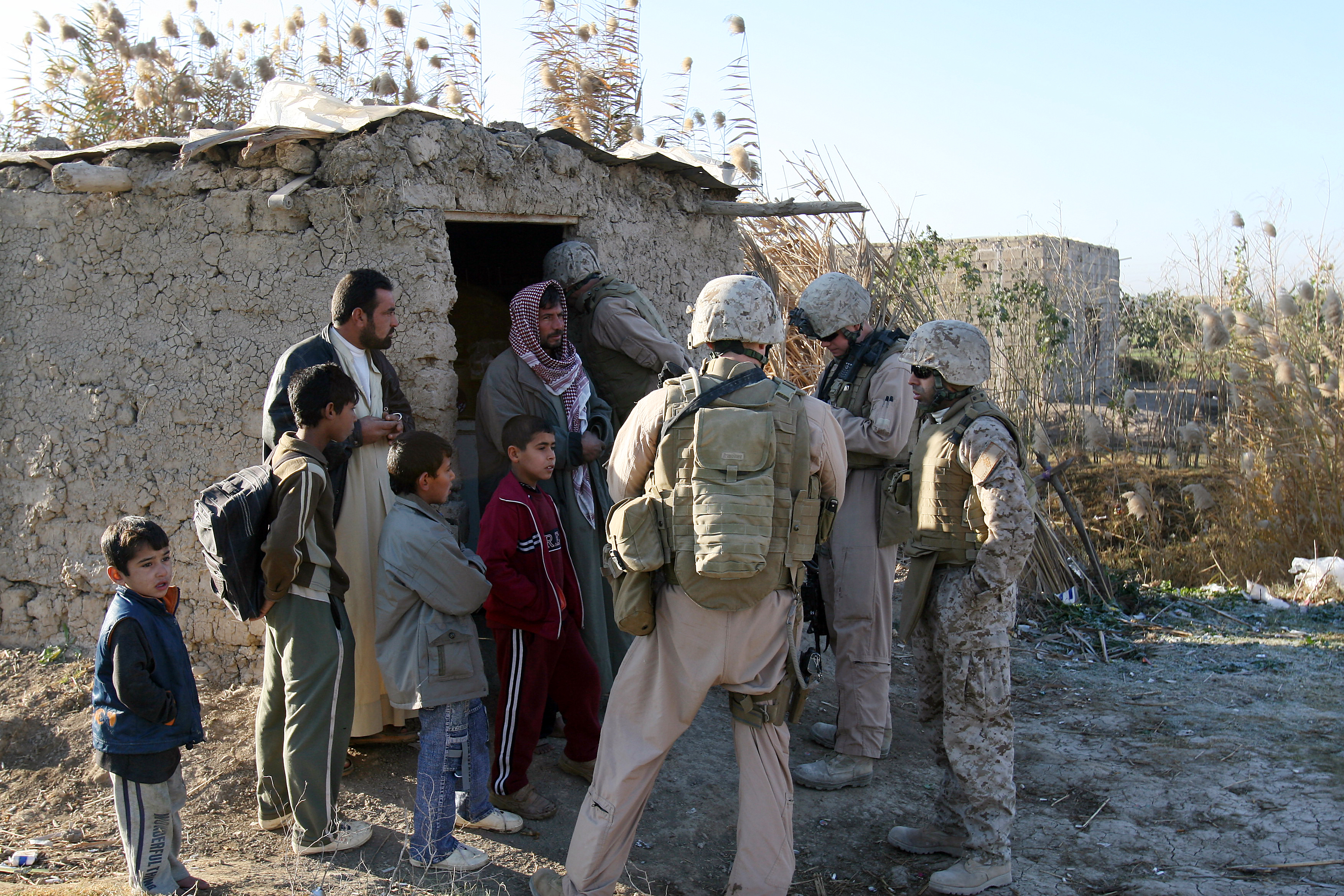
Residents of Al Zaidan at their home

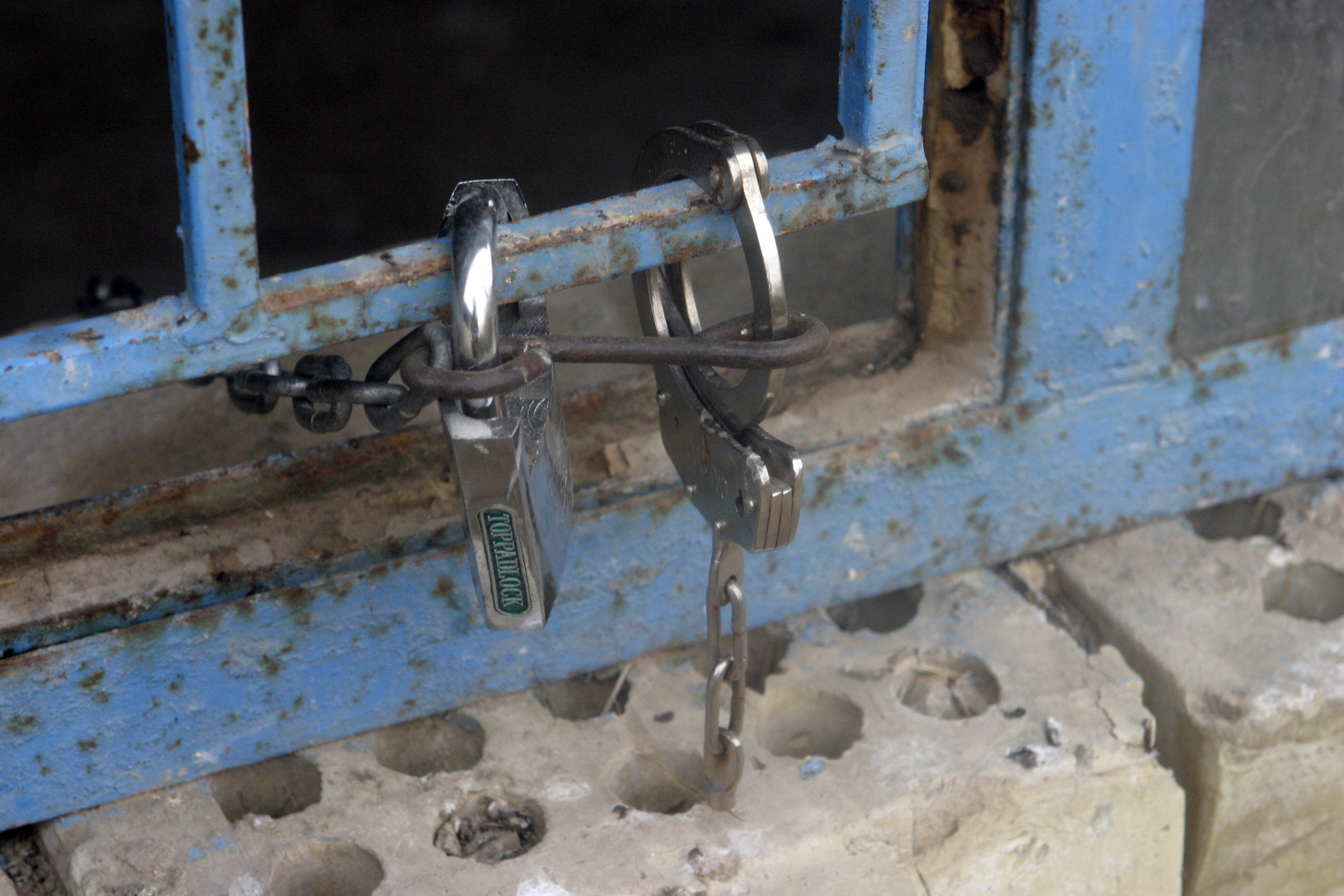
Evidence of torture found in a house in Al Zaidan in 2007

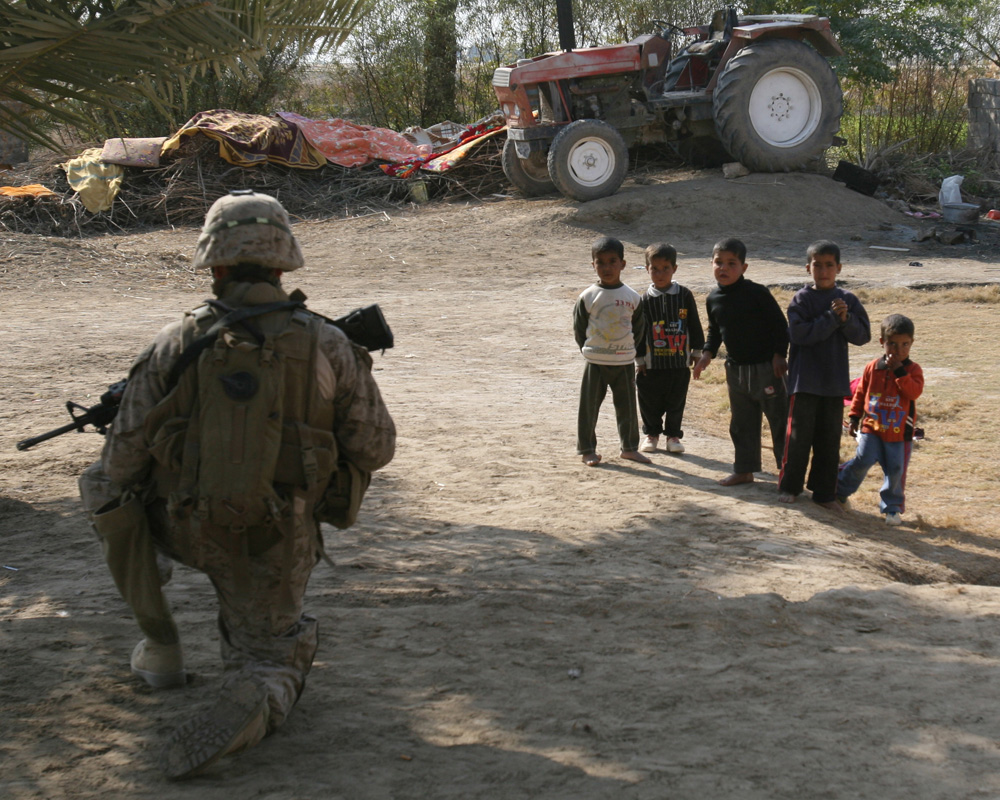
Local children watch United States Marines during the Iraq War
