= Murder in North Carolina law =

Homicide in North Carolina law constitutes the intentional killing, under circumstances defined by law, of people within or under the jurisdiction of the U.S. state of North Carolina.

The United States Centers for Disease Control and Prevention reported that in the year 2020, the state had a murder rate somewhat above the median for the entire country.

== Elements ==
First-degree murder in North Carolina is defined as occurring when a person "kills... another living human being":

(a) (i) with malice and

(ii) with a specific intent to kill formed after premeditation and deliberation,

(b) by poisoning, lying in wait, imprisonment, starvation, or torture,
(c) while committing or attempting arson, rape, sex offense, robbery, burglary, kidnapping, or any felony in which a deadly weapon is used, or
(d) by means of a nuclear, biological, or chemical weapon of mass destruction.

Second-degree murder only requires that a person kill another living human being with malice.

== Penalties ==
Offense	Mandatory sentencing
Involuntary manslaughter	Maximum of 59 months (sentence without criminal record is 10 to 20 months)
Voluntary manslaughter	Maximum of 204 months (sentence without criminal record is 38 to 80 months)
Second degree murder (inherently dangerous act or by unlawful distribution of certain illicit substances)	Maximum of 484 months (sentence without criminal record is 94 to 196 months)
Second degree murder	Maximum of life without parole (sentence without criminal record is 144 to 300 months)
First degree murder	Death (aggravating circumstances), life without parole, or life (minimum of 25 years; only an option if the defendant was a juvenile)
