= 1996 Secaucus train collision =

Train crash in Secaucus, New Jersey

Secaucus Train Collision
- The accident site looking north

Details
- Date: February 9, 1996; 30 years ago 8:40 a.m. (EST)
- Location: Secaucus, New Jersey
- Coordinates: 40°45′7.26″N 74°4′11.70″W
- Country: United States
- Line: Bergen County Line & Main Line
- Operator: NJ Transit
- Incident type: Collision
- Cause: Signal passed at danger due to color blindness of train engineer

Statistics
- Trains: 2 (Trains #1254 and #1107)
- Passengers: 400
- Crew: 6
- Deaths: 3
- Injured: 162

On February 9, 1996, two NJ Transit commuter trains collided at Bergen Junction (since removed/abandoned) in Secaucus, New Jersey, United States. This accident occurred during the morning rush hour just south of the current Secaucus Junction station. It is NJ Transit's deadliest accident to date and the first in which passengers and crew died. Three people were killed and 162 injured.

== Background ==
On the evening of February 8, 1996, at approximately 6:11 p.m. EST, NJ Transit Engineer John J. DeCurtis officially began his night-shift, which would last a little over 12 hours including a 5 hour break in-between. This was the usual shift that this engineer worked by choice since 1992, and with him was assigned Conductor Stephen Miller and an unnamed Assistant Conductor.

For most of the first 7 hours of this night-shift, DeCurtis mainly operated Bergen County Line trains between Hoboken Terminal and Waldwick station so as to adhere to the rush hour timetable and the later off-peak runs into the night. However, as DeCurtis and Miller went about their shift, signal issues that would persist into the early hours of February 9 developed on the Port Jervis Line. Nonetheless, DeCurtis operated his last evening train normally and without incident as he departed Hoboken Terminal at 11:50 p.m. and arrived at Suffern around 12:49 a.m. on the 9th. DeCurtis and his crew signed off duty for what was supposed to be their 5 hour break at 12:58 a.m., although it was later noted by Miller that for the first 15 minutes after signing off, DeCurtis and Miller secured the train and then walked to the first car so as to rest/sleep for the majority of the given break time. An alarm clock was set by the crew so that they would wake up at 5:30 a.m. to operate a return trip to Hoboken before signing off for the day.

At 5:44 a.m., DeCurtis and Miller officially signed back in. The crew then spent around 30 minutes performing the necessary brake and start-up tests and procedures before departing Suffern station at 6:12 a.m. with a Bergen County Line semi local to Hoboken.

This trip went uneventfully and the crew arrived back at Hoboken just after 7:13 a.m., when the Train Master requested DeCurtis and Miller operate Train #1254 as the original crew was delayed due to the previous night's signal issues on the Port Jervis Line. DeCurtis and Miller accepted the assignment and the Train Master later reported that they did not look fatigued.

DeCurtis, Miller, and the unnamed Assistant Conductor took command of a consist that consisted of one Comet II cab car (#5146), 4 trailer Comet I cars, and a GP40PH-2 #4110. The crew then ran non-revenue until reaching Waldwick and turning around to be switched onto track 2 to become Train #1254.

=== Train #1254 ===
Train #1254 departed Waldwick at 8:03 a.m. EST, about 5 minutes later than the 7:58 a.m. departure time. The train was in the push configuration with GP40PH-2 #4110 pushing while Comet II cab car #5146 now led the train.

Following departure from Waldwick, Miller reminded DeCurtis, saying, "We make all the stops except Glen Rock,". Miller and the Assistant Conductor then spent the majority of the trip collecting tickets and chatting with passengers. Miller later recalled that this was likely his last direct conversation with the engineer.

Later testimony from the surviving crew indicated that they took no exception to the engineer's handling of the train either on previous trips, nor on that run of Bergen County Line Train #1254 up until the point of the accident.

All the scheduled passenger stops at Ho Ho Kus, Ridgewood, Radburn Fair Lawn, Broadway Fair Lawn, Plauderville, Garfield, Rutherford, and later Harmon Cove (it was replaced by Secaucus Junction by 2003) were made without incident. The train's final stop was supposed to be Hoboken Terminal with an arrival expected at 8:44 a.m.

=== Train #1107 ===
Train #1107, headed for Suffern, had departed Hoboken Terminal at 8:31 a.m. EST, about one minute late. Train #1107 was operated by engineer Alfonso Debonis, as well as an unnamed conductor and assistant conductor. This train was operating in pull mode at the time of the accident, with GP40PH-2A #4148 leading the train of 5 Comet I trailer cars, and one Comet I cab car (#5120). At the time of the collision, the train held 125 passengers and 2 deadheading NJT employees who were traveling to Suffern so they could operate another train that originated there. Both trains were running in push-pull configuration.

== Accident ==
Train #1254 had left Harmon Cove station at 8:33 a.m. with 275 passengers and accelerated to 53 mph. Meanwhile, Train #1107 departed Hoboken at 8:31 a.m. with 125 passengers aboard. Train #1254 soon passed a medium approach position light signal telling the train to slow down at 34 mph, according to black box data. The next signal would show the engineer a stop indication at Bergen Junction to wait for Train #1107 to pass before Train #1254 would be allowed to continue to Hoboken. Train #1254 continued to slow until about 71 feet before the stop signal. The engineer then accelerated the train to 20 mph after passing the red signal. Shortly afterward, the engineer likely noticed the misaligned switch or saw Train #1107 and the emergency brake was applied.

Several moments earlier, Train #1107 had been shown a clear signal and was approaching the western end of Bergen Junction at 53 mph (the track speed for that section was 70 mph). Train #1254 was moving at 18 mph when the collision occurred. Passenger accounts on Train #1254 describe the sound of the brakes and the blaring of the train horn moments before the collision.

Cab Car #5146 was ripped open in the collision, killing the engineer John J. DeCurtis and a passenger aboard train #1254, Arthur David Stern. Locomotive #4148's roof collapsed in on the cab on impact thereby killing Engineer Alfonso Debonis instantly. In addition, 162 passengers were injured.

=== Fatalities ===
There were three fatalities:

- John J. DeCurtis, 59, lived on Staten Island, was the engineer of train #1254 and had been an engineer for 40 years.
- Arthur David Stern, 49, lived in Fair Lawn, was a lawyer in New York City. He was the only passenger who died.
- Alfonso Debonis, 47, lived in Hasbrouck Heights, was the engineer of train #1107, employed by NJ Transit Rail Operations for 7 years, was promoted to engineer in 1990.

== Aftermath ==
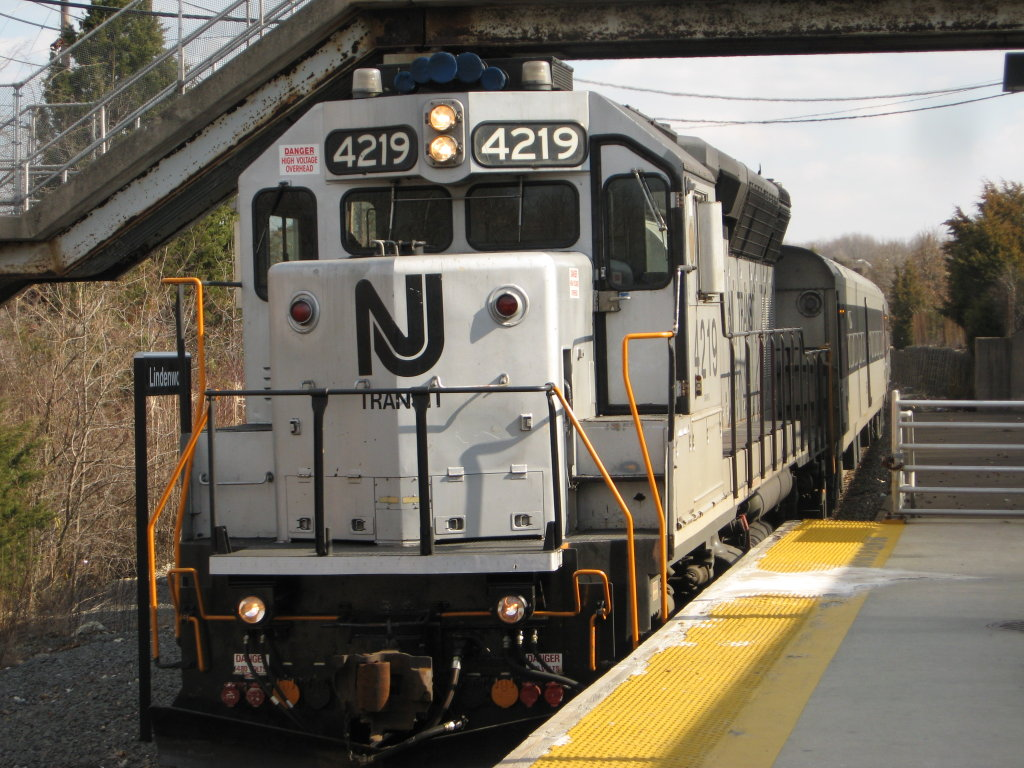
NJT 4219, (formerly 4148), seen in March 2008

The accident was the New York City area's worst train accident since the 1958 Newark Bay rail accident.

Following the accident, Comet II cab car #5146 was scrapped, while GP40PH-2 #4110 and Comet I cab car #5120 continued in revenue service until their eventual retirement and in the case of Comet I cab car #5120, donation to the Whippany Railroad Museum in New Jersey.

One year later, in 1997, GP40PH-2A #4148 was rebuilt, and put back in service as GP40PH-2B #4219 following the rebuild.

The total damage from the accident was estimated at $3.3 million USD by NJ Transit.

=== Emergency response ===
The New Jersey Transit Police Department was notified at 8:40 am and arrived at the accident site 13 minutes later. Other emergency services arrived within about 10 to 20 minutes after the first several 911 calls were made, although the response of the first responders was initially hampered by the inaccessibility of accident location.

=== Initial NJ Transit response ===
The conductor of train #1254 was able to evacuate all passengers of the train with the help of the assistant conductor. The conductor aboard train #1107 was reported to be visibly upset, repeatedly crying that "people are dead" which also worried many passengers, the 2 deadheading NJ Transit employees helped evacuate the train instead. After the evacuation, the remaining crew members stood watch to flag down any oncoming trains. Both crews abroad both trains did not use the public address system to communicate with passengers, they instead went from car to car yelling for passengers to exit the train. The assistant conductor aboard train #1254 later reported that he did not know if the public address system was working or not, so he did not use it. The conductor aboard train #1107 could not recall if the system worked or not. Throughout the evacuation process, both train crews communicated by hand held radio. The accident was first reported by the engineer of eastbound NJ Transit Train #1400 on the Main Line a little after 8:40 am.
