= Harmon Cove station =

Abandoned train station in New Jersey, US

Coordinates: 40.7813°N 74.0790°W

Harmon Cove

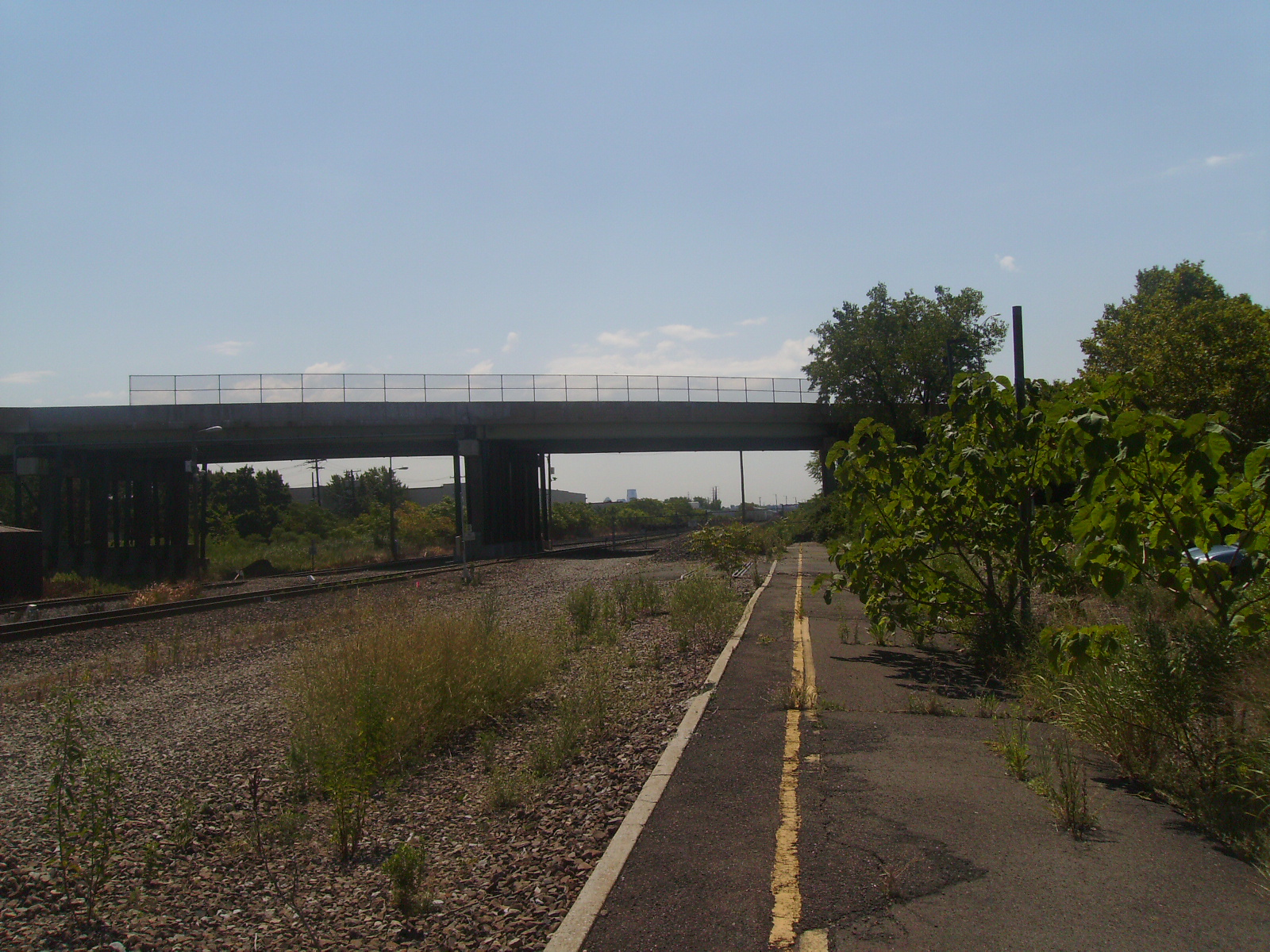
- The site of Harmon Cove station.

General information
- Location: Meadowlands Parkway, Secaucus, New Jersey
- Owner: Norfolk Southern Railway (owner of trackage from 1999); NJ Transit (operator from 1983); Conrail (operator until 1983, owner of trackage until 1999)
- Line: Bergen County Line
- Platforms: ground-level
- Tracks: 2

Construction
- Platform levels: 1

History
- Opened: June 26, 1978; 48 years ago
- Closed: August 4, 2003; 23 years ago

Services
Preceding station	NJ Transit	Following station
Rutherford toward Suffern	Bergen County Line	Hoboken Terminus
Location

Harmon Cove is an abandoned train station in the Harmon Cove section of Secaucus, New Jersey. The station was a former stop on the Bergen County Line which runs from Hoboken Terminal to Suffern. Train service was discontinued in 2003 when Secaucus Junction was opened.

== History ==
=== Construction and opening ===
Harmon Cove station was built to serve the gated community known as Harmon Cove, which was developed starting in 1975 by Hartz Mountain Industries with townhouses and highrise residential buildings. This development played a key part in the transition of Secaucus from being a part of wetlands in the New Jersey Meadowlands to being highly developed. In December 1977, Hartz Mountain Industries sent an application to the Hackensack Meadowlands Development Commission for permission to construct a station and a 100-car parking lot to serve its development. Following the issuance of the permit, it was expected that construction on the station could begin within 60 days.

The station was built adjacent to the development at Meadowlands Parkway on the site of a reed-filled meadow for $150,000. The station was dedicated on June 19, 1978, and opened on June 26, 1978. Service consisted of ten trains, with westbound trains at 7:22 a.m., 3:42 p.m., 5:15 p.m., 5:38 p.m., and 6:32 p.m., and eastbound trains at 6:44 a.m., 7:53 a.m., 8:32 a.m., 9:34 a.m., and 5:00 p.m. Construction on the station began a month earlier. Service to the station initially consisted of two trains in the morning to Hoboken and two trains in the evening from Hoboken. The station initially opened on a temporary basis, but was later made permanent. This station was, and still remains, the only privately financed and constructed rail station in New Jersey. After a month, ridership at the station was only 30 people a day, lower than Conrail's estimate of 50 people a day. Conrail decreased the number of trains stopping from ten to seven since adding Harmon Cove stops to trains added four minutes to the runtime of each trip. Hartz Mountain spent $80,000 to provide bus service to the station.

=== Closure ===
In the 1980s, New Jersey Transit started making plans to create a transfer station in Secaucus between trains on its Hoboken and Newark Divisions. As part of the plan, Harmon Cove station would close due to its close proximity to the new station. However, in 1993, the President of Allied Junction, the name of original plan for the transfer station, said that Harmon Cove station would stay open. In September 2001, New Jersey Transit officials told Town Administrator Anthony Iacono that the station would close in anticipation of the opening of Secaucus Junction station. New Jersey Transit made the decision earlier in the year when it was decided to construct a new curving track between the HX Draw bridge at the Hackensack River to the north of the station, and the Main Line north of Secaucus Junction, which would bypass the site of Harmon Cove station and allow Bergen County Line and Pascack Valley Line trains to stop at Secaucus Junction.

The station closed on August 4, 2003, in anticipation of the opening of Secaucus Junction station. To replace train service, a bus shuttle was implemented, which ran between Harmon Cove and Secaucus Junction, thus connecting with Bergen County Line trains. This shuttle was operated by Academy Express and was labeled bus route 972. This route was replaced by NJ Transit bus route 129 on April 3, 2004.

== Station layout ==
Harmon Cove had one short low-level side platform and was located on the Erie Railroad's Main Line, and had a 100-car parking lot, and had a shelter that could accommodate 50 passengers. A staircase led from the platform to the Meadowlands Parkway overpass. The staircase still exists, but has been abandoned. The station shelter was removed following the station's closure. The parking lot still exists. The platform still remains, but is in derelict condition.
