= HX Draw =

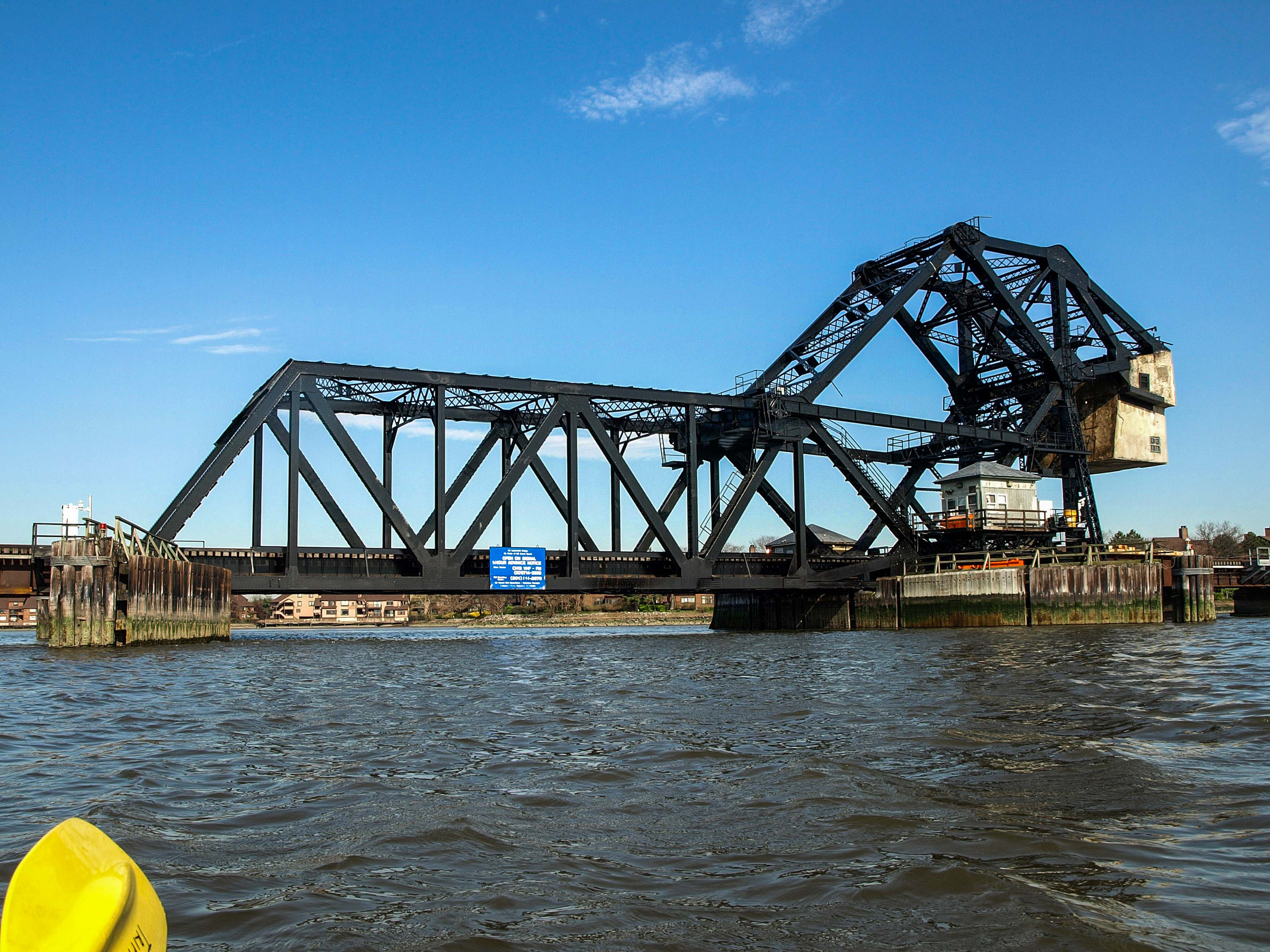
- The HX Draw Bridge in 2009
- Coordinates: 40.788078°N 74.081869°W
- Carries: NJ Transit Bergen County Line and Pascack Valley Line
- Crosses: Hackensack River
- Locale: Secaucus and East Rutherford, New Jersey
- Maintained by: NJ Transit

Characteristics
- Design: Warren through truss bascule bridge
- Material: Steel

History
- Constructed by: Strauss Bascule Bridge Co.
- Opened: 1911

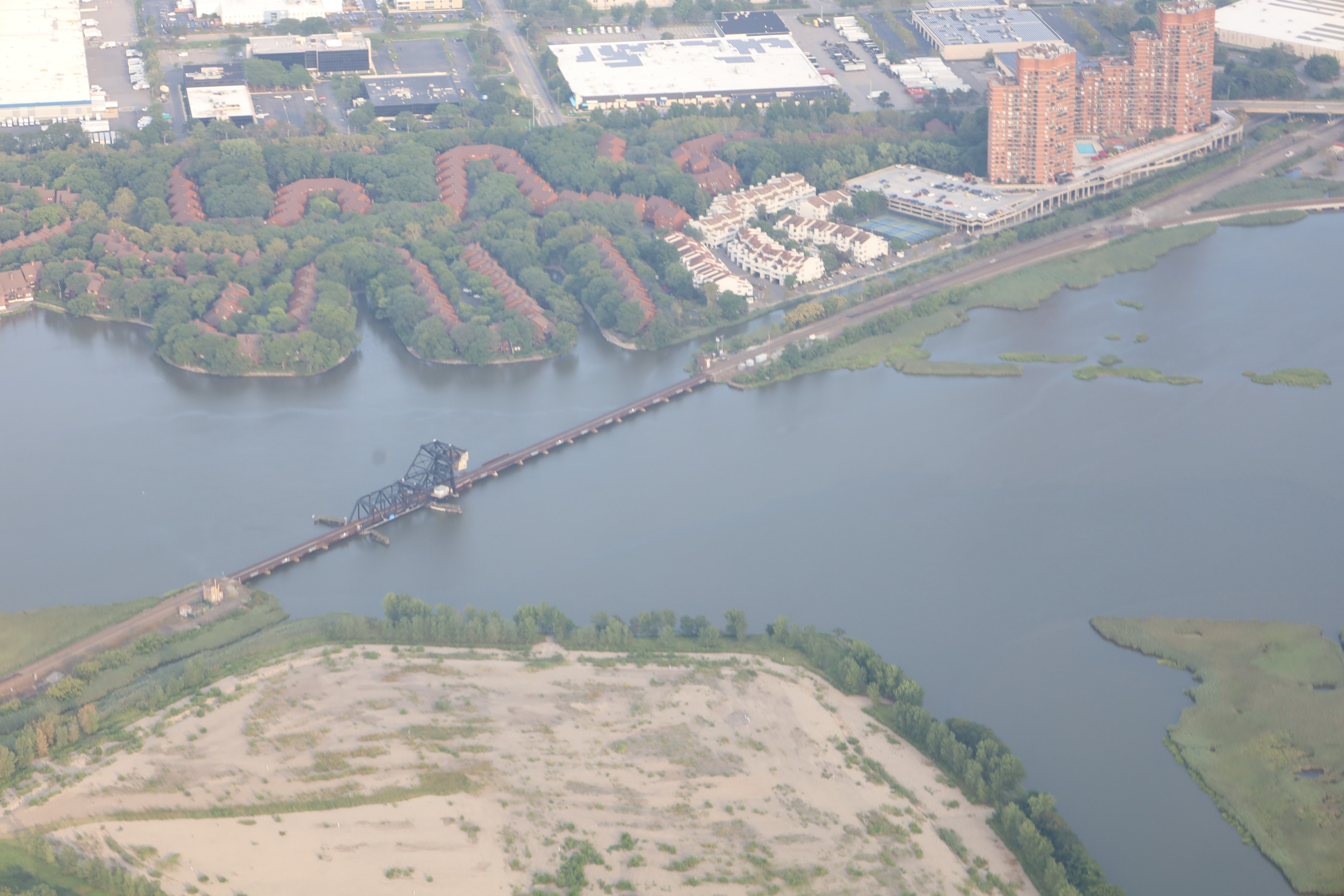
Aerial view in 2023

The HX Draw is a bascule bridge carrying the New Jersey Transit Bergen County Line and Pascack Valley Line across the Hackensack River between Secaucus and East Rutherford. It is commonly nicknamed the "Jack-Knife Bridge" due to its single-leaf bascule mechanism that lifts vertically like a knife blade.

== History ==
The bridge was designed by noted engineer Joseph Strauss, best known as the chief engineer of the Golden Gate Bridge. Completed in 1911, the HX Draw was one of the first heel trunnion bascule bridges constructed in the United States and originally served as part of the Erie Railroad's main line.

The bridge features a Warren through truss design with a steel bascule leaf that opens to allow for maritime traffic on the Hackensack River, a federally navigable waterway. It is operated by NJ Transit, which assumed control after the consolidation of the Erie Lackawanna system into Conrail and later NJ Transit Rail Operations.

In 2008, NJ Transit conducted repainting and minor structural updates to maintain functionality and improve corrosion resistance.

== Design and Operation ==
The HX Draw is a single-leaf bascule bridge utilizing a heel trunnion mechanism, meaning the lifting span pivots vertically on a fixed axle mounted near its heel (inboard) end. This design was considered innovative in the early 20th century for rail crossings with limited space. The bridge does not accommodate roadway traffic and is dedicated solely to rail operations.

The span remains one of the few operational movable bridges in New Jersey used exclusively for commuter rail, and must open on demand for vessels as required by U.S. Coast Guard regulations.

== See also ==
- Hackensack RiverWalk
- Timeline of Jersey City area railroads
- Movable bridges in New Jersey
- List of bridges, tunnels, and cuts in Hudson County, New Jersey
