= NJ Transit =

Public transportation system

- Gallery of NJ Transit services

Overview
- Locale: New Jersey (statewide); New York, Rockland and Orange counties, New York; Philadelphia and Northampton County, Pennsylvania
- Transit type: Commuter rail; Light rail; Bus
- Number of lines: 12 (commuter rail); 3 (light rail); 253 (bus)
- Number of stations: 165 (rail); 86 (light rail); 26 (bus terminals); 15991 (bus stops); (2022 figures, all modes)
- Annual ridership: 221,114,200 (2025)
- Chief executive: Kris Kolluri
- Headquarters: 2 Gateway Center, Newark, New Jersey
- Website: njtransit.com

Operation
- Began operation: July 17, 1979; 47 years ago
- Operators: Commuter rail: See rail article; Light Rail: See light rail article; Bus: See bus article
- Number of vehicles: 1,231 (commuter rail); 93 (light rail); 2,356 (NJT bus); 696 (private bus operators); (2023 figures, all modes)

Technical
- System length: 1,000.8 mi (1,610.6 km) (rail); 116.2 mi (187.0 km) (light rail); (2018 figures)

The New Jersey Transit Corporation, branded as NJ Transit or NJTransit and often shortened to NJT, is the state agency that owns the public transportation system that serves the U.S. state of New Jersey and portions of the states of New York and Pennsylvania. It operates buses, light rail, and commuter rail services throughout the state, connecting to major commercial and employment centers both within the state and in its two adjacent major cities, New York City and Philadelphia. In 2025, the system had an annual ridership of 221,114,200.

Covering a service area of 5,325 square miles (13,790 km^{2}), NJT is the largest statewide public transit system and the third-largest provider of bus, rail, and light rail transit by ridership in the United States.

NJT also acts as a purchasing agency for many private operators in the state, in particular, buses to serve routes not served by the transit agency.

== History ==
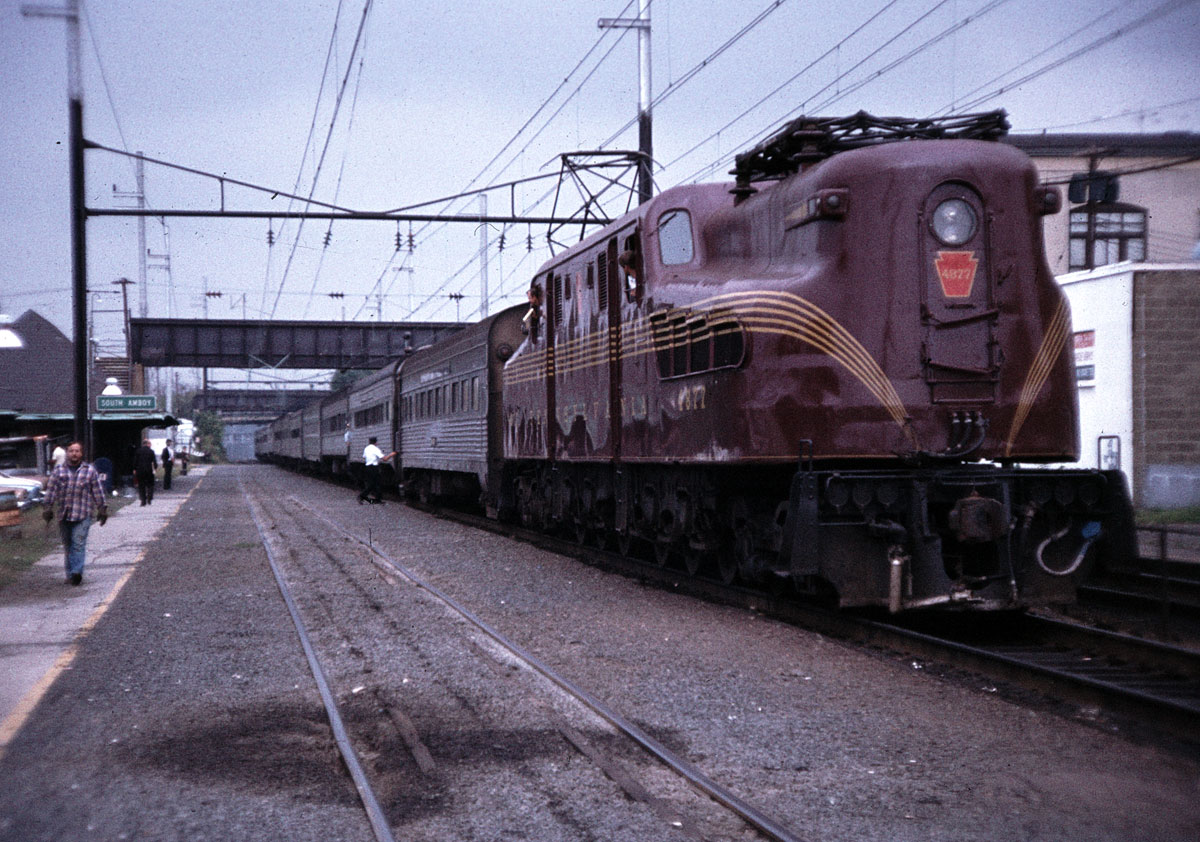
A Pennsylvania Railroad class GG1 train, built for the Pennsylvania Railroad in the 1930s–1940s, hauls a commuter train into South Amboy station in 1981

NJT was created on July 17, 1979, as an offspring of the New Jersey Department of Transportation (NJDOT), mandated by the New Jersey Legislature to address many then-pressing transportation problems. It came into being with the enactment of the Public Transportation Act of 1979 to "acquire, operate, and contract for transportation service in the public interest." NJT originally acquired and managed a number of private bus services, one of the largest being those operated by the state's largest electric company, Public Service Electric and Gas Company. It gradually acquired most of the state's bus services. In northern New Jersey, many of the bus routes are arranged in a web. In southern New Jersey, most routes are arranged in a "spoke-and-hub" fashion, with routes emanating from Trenton, Camden, and Atlantic City.

In 1983, NJT assumed operation of all commuter rail service in New Jersey from Conrail, which had been formed in 1976 through the merging of a number of financially troubled railroads. Conrail had operated two extensive commuter railroad networks in northern New Jersey under contract to NJDOT; in turn, these lines were the successors of numerous commuter routes dating from the mid-19th century. NJT now operates every passenger and commuter rail line in the state except for Amtrak, the Port Authority Trans-Hudson (PATH), which is owned by the Port Authority of New York and New Jersey, the PATCO Speedline, which is owned by the Delaware River Port Authority, two SEPTA Regional Rail lines, the West Trenton Line the Trenton Line, and a handful of tourist trains in the southern and northwestern parts of New Jersey. Since inception, rail ridership has quadrupled.

In the 1990s, the rail system expanded, with new Midtown Direct service to New York City and new equipment. On October 21, 2001, it opened a new station at Newark Liberty International Airport. On December 15, 2003, it opened the Secaucus Junction transfer station, replacing the former Harmon Cove station, connecting its two commuter networks in northern New Jersey for the first time. The new station allowed passengers on trains to Hoboken Terminal to transfer to trains to New York Penn Station in Midtown Manhattan, saving an estimated 15 minutes over connecting with PATH trains at Hoboken. On October 31, 2005, NJT took over Clocker (NY–Philadelphia) service from Amtrak. Four new trains were added to the schedule, but cut back to Trenton.

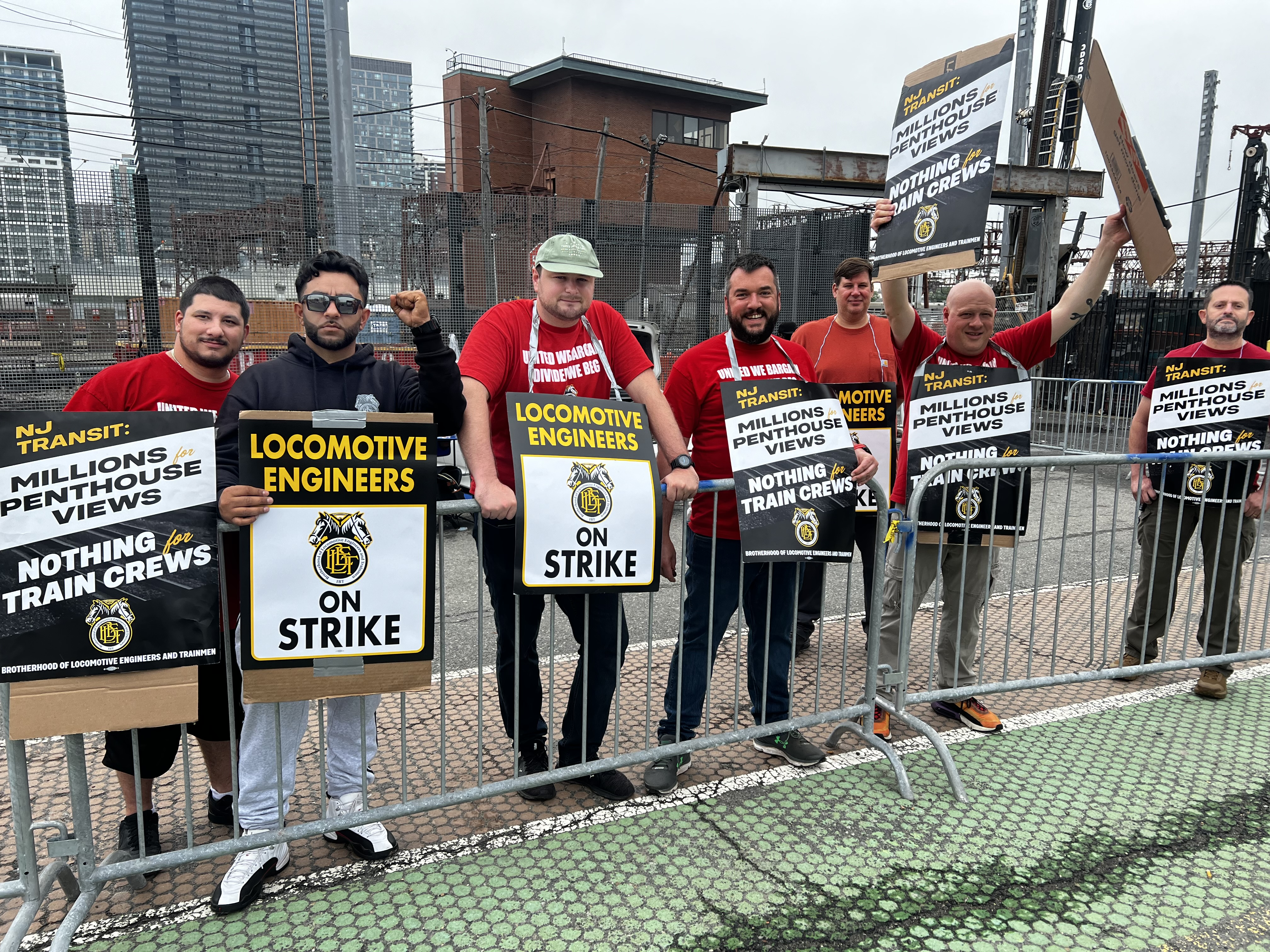
Locomotive engineers picketing at Hoboken Station, May 16, 2025

From 2009 to 2011, NJT operated the Atlantic City Express Service (ACES) from New York Penn Station to Atlantic City Rail Terminal as a seasonal/weekend train under contract with the Casino Reinvestment Development Authority.

During Hurricane Sandy in October 2012, the rail operations center of NJ Transit was flooded by 8 feet (2.4 m) of water and an emergency generator submerged. Floodwater damaged at least 65 locomotive engines and 257 rail cars.

On May 16, 2025, a strike by the Brotherhood of Locomotive Engineers and Trainmen caused the suspension of the entire NJ Transit rail network due to pay disputes. An agreement was reached on May 18 to end the strike, with full train service resuming the following Tuesday, May 20, after safety inspections.

== Governance ==
The governor of New Jersey appoints a thirteen-member board of directors, consisting of eleven voting and two non-voting members. The voting members consist of eight from the general public and three state officials. The two non-voting members are "recommended by labor organizations representing the plurality of employees". The governor has veto power on decisions made by the board.

In 2026, the United States Supreme Court held in Galette v. New Jersey Transit Corp. that NJ Transit is not an arm of the New Jersey government, meaning NJ Transit is not entitled to interstate sovereign immunity. Accordingly, NJ Transit may be sued by people in courts outside of New Jersey.

== Current operations ==
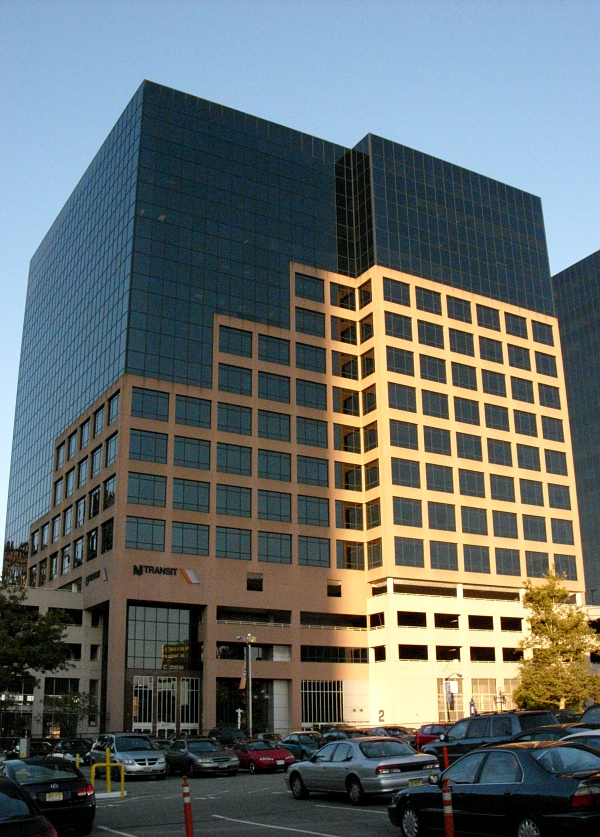
NJ Transit's headquarters at Penn Plaza East in Newark

NJT splits its operations into three classes: bus, light rail, and commuter rail, operated by four legal businesses: NJ Transit Bus Operations, Inc., subsidiaries NJ Transit Mercer, Inc. and NJ Transit Morris, Inc., and NJ Transit Rail Operations, Inc..

=== Bus ===
NJT Bus Operations operates 253 bus routes using 2,356 buses. Its subsidiaries NJ Transit Mercer and NJ Transit Morris operate those routes concentrated in Trenton and Monmouth and Morris counties. 696 additional buses are also leased out to several private New Jersey operators, including Coach USA, Lakeland, Transbridge Lines, and Academy.

=== Light rail ===
NJT operates three light rail systems:

- Hudson–Bergen Light Rail – Three lines comprising a total of 24 stations and 20.6 miles (33.2 km) in length, running along the Hudson Waterfront from Bayonne to North Bergen in Hudson County.
- Newark Light Rail – Two lines comprising a total of 17 stations and 5.3 miles (8.5 km) in length, running to and from major transportation hubs in Newark and the surrounding area.
- River Line – A single line comprising a total of 21 stations and 34 miles (55 km) in length, running along the Delaware River from Trenton to Camden. The line runs diesel multiple unit trains.

=== Commuter rail ===
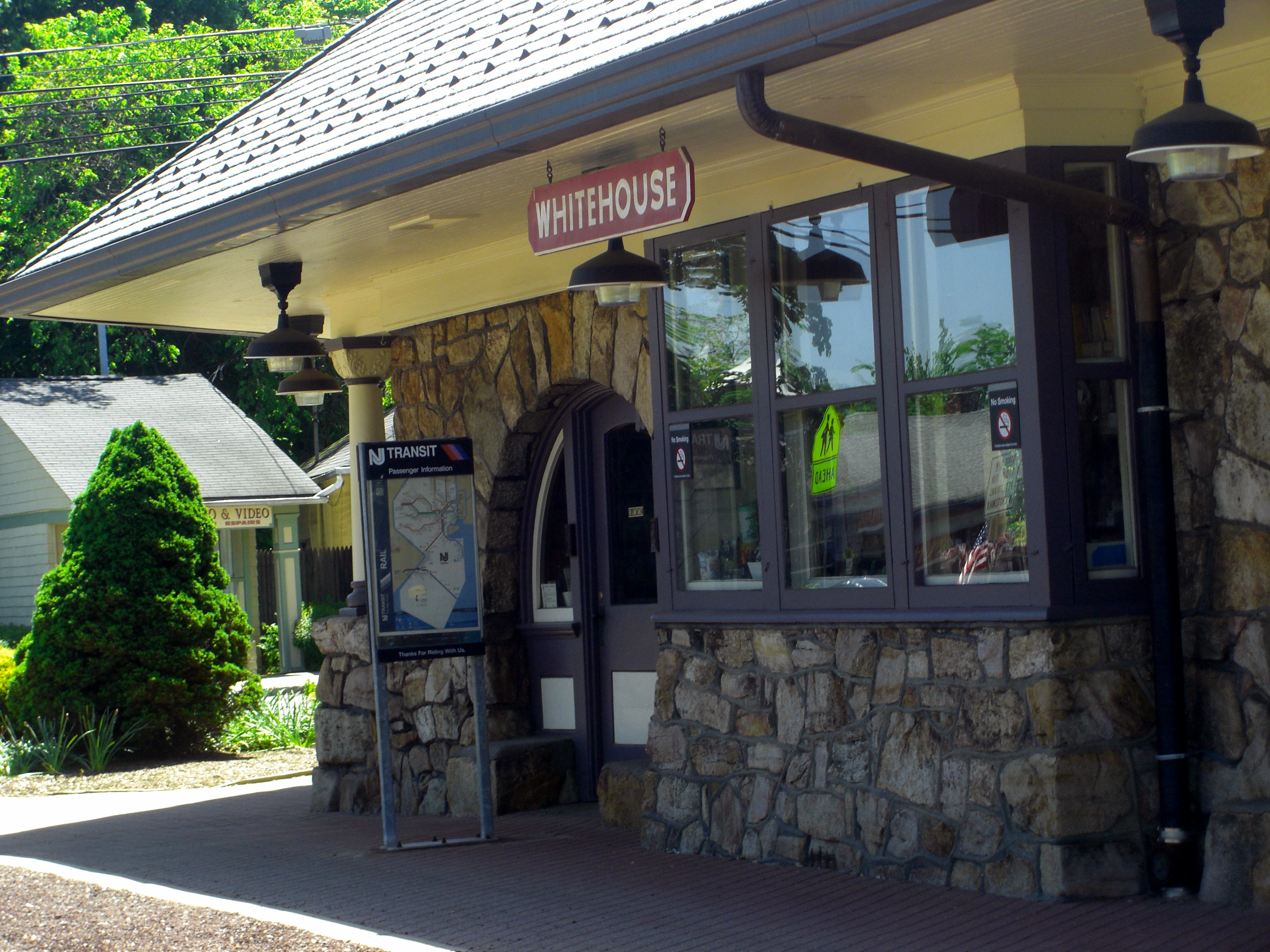
White House station on the Raritan Valley Line

NJT operates thirteen commuter rail lines, two of which are operated under a contract with Metro-North Railroad.

- Atlantic City Line
- Bergen County Line
- Main Line
- Meadowlands Rail Line (for special events at the Meadowlands Sports Complex only)
- Montclair-Boonton Line
- Morris & Essex Lines, consisting of:
  - Morristown Line
  - Gladstone Branch
- North Jersey Coast Line
- Northeast Corridor Line (includes the Princeton Branch)
- Pascack Valley Line (Stations in New York operated under a contract with Metro-North Railroad)
- Port Jervis Line (under a contract with Metro-North Railroad)
- Raritan Valley Line

== Police ==
The New Jersey Transit Police Department (NJTPD) is the transit police agency of NJ Transit. New Jersey Transit Police operates under the authority of Chapter 27 of the NJ Revised Statutes. Title 27:25-15.1 states in part "The Transit Police Officers so appointed shall have general authority, without limitation, to exercise police powers and duties, as provided by law for police officers and law enforcement officers, in all criminal and traffic matters at all times throughout the State and, in addition, to enforce such rules and regulations as the corporation shall adopt and deem appropriate."

One of the primary responsibilities of NJ Transit Police is to provide police services and security to the hundreds of bus terminals, rail stations, light-rail stations and all other property owned, operated and leased by NJ Transit throughout the state. The Department employs approximately 250 sworn police officers.

== Projects ==
=== Ongoing projects ===
==== Gateway Program ====
This project will expand and restore the Northeast Corridor through a series of phases. It will create new capacity that will allow the doubling of passenger trains running under the Hudson River. The program will increase track, tunnel, bridge, and station capacity, eventually creating four mainline tracks between Newark, NJ, and Penn Station, New York, including a new, two-track Hudson River tunnel. It is being undertaken in partnership with Amtrak, the Port Authority of New York and New Jersey, the State of New Jersey, and the State of New York.

===== Portal Bridge Replacement Project =====
This project will replace the existing century-old swing-span bridge with a new, fixed-span bridge over the Hackensack River. The current bridge causes train traffic and delays due to maritime traffic, as well as malfunctions occurring from opening and closing; the new bridge will eliminate the movable span, thus improving reliability and increasing train speeds. The project is partnered with the Port Authority of New York and New Jersey, NJ Transit, Amtrak, and United States Department of Transportation, with funding provided by NJ Transit, Amtrak, and the Federal Railroad Administration.

===== Hudson Tunnel Project =====
This project will entail the design and construction of a new Hudson River rail tunnel serving Penn Station, New York, and the rehabilitation and modernization of the existing North River Tunnels, which incurred serious and ongoing damage during Hurricane Sandy. The tunnel was flooded with millions of gallons of saltwater during Hurricane Sandy, causing corrosion that continues to damage the century-old tunnel. It plans to build a new tunnel, rather than close and renovate the existing tunnel, as doing so would leave only one of the North River Tunnels in service, which would cause a massive reduction in rail service. As of 2018, the final design was completed and it is being advanced through the U.S. Department of Transportation TIGER grant. The project is partnered with the FRA, PANYNJ, NJ Transit and Amtrak, all of which have provided a total funding of $86.5 million.

==== Hudson–Bergen Light Rail (HBLR) Northern Branch Extension ====
This project will extend the Hudson–Bergen Light Rail from North Bergen in Hudson County to Englewood in Bergen County. The extension will better meet the needs of travelers in the area, advance cost-effective transit solutions, improve regional mobility and access, reduce roadway congestion, and attract growth and development. There have been several public hearings so far, and the project has received the Supplemental Draft Environmental Impact Statement from the Environmental Protection Agency. The final EIS was expected to be completed by the end of 2019. As of December 2022, the project is still in its design phase, and NJT was given a $600K federal grant to study transit-oriented development along the proposed extension.

==== Hudson-Bergen Light Rail (HBLR) Route 440 Extension ====
This project will extend Hudson-Bergen Light Rail access in Jersey City. It will extend service from West Side Avenue Station by 0.7 miles (1.1 km) of new rail to a new terminus on the west side of Route 440. An environmental assessment has been prepared by NJ Transit, and the Federal Transit Administration has issued a Finding of No Significance Impact (FONSI). Preliminary engineering began in 2018. The new station will be a contributing factor to the $180 million urban renewal project of Bayfront. There is also a project to improve Route 440 itself near the rail extension. As of 2020, the project is still ongoing after upgrades were made to West Side Avenue Station

==== Lackawanna Cut-Off Restoration Project ====
In May 2001, New Jersey acquired the right-of-way of the Lackawanna Cut-Off. Constructed by the Delaware, Lackawanna and Western Railroad between 1908 and 1911, this provided a direct route with minimal curves and grades between Slateford Junction, two miles (3.25 km) below the Delaware Water Gap, and the crest of the watershed at Lake Hopatcong (Port Morris Junction), the connection with NJT's Montclair-Boonton Line. This would restore long-distance service that the Erie Lackawanna last provided with the Lake Cities in 1970.

At the time of the Cut-Off's construction, the DL&W had extensive experience with concrete construction, but not on the scale that would be employed on the Cut-Off. All structures, including stations, bridges, interlocking towers and two large viaducts and thousands of fence posts, were made of concrete. Despite the lack of maintenance on these structures over the past four decades (and in some cases much longer), most are still in operational or near-operational condition. A 2009 study by NJT estimated that bringing the line back into operation to Scranton, Pennsylvania, would cost approximately $551 million, although service may be extended in several interim phases before reaching Scranton.

In 2011, the Lackawanna Cut-Off Restoration Project from Port Morris to Andover, a distance of 7.3 miles (11.7 km), began. The project was delayed by a lack of environmental permits to clear the roadbed between Lake Lackawanna and Andover. Based on projections from NJ Transit, the restart of construction, including extensive work on Roseville Tunnel, was to occur in mid- to late-2016, with the re-opening of service to Andover projected to occur in 2020. The proposed rehabilitation west of Andover, which has not yet been funded, would provide commuter rail service between Hoboken Terminal and New York's Penn Station, and would serve the growing exurban communities in Monroe County, Pennsylvania, the Pocono Mountains, northern Warren County, and southern Sussex County in New Jersey. In October 2015, the Federal Transit Administration (FTA) requested that a preliminary engineering study be performed in order to update the cost figures on the previous study. Funding for this study is currently being sought.

As of 2023, the projected completion date for Andover service is 2027, with work at Roseville Tunnel and Andover, NJ ongoing. There is a possibility of Amtrak extending service from New York City to Scranton, PA via the Cut-Off, but no official commitment for that service has been made to date.

==== Glassboro–Camden Line ====
The Glassboro–Camden Line is an 18-mile (28.97 km) diesel multiple unit (DMU) light rail system planned for southwestern part of New Jersey in the United States. At its northern end in Camden, it will connect with the River Line, with which its infrastructure and vehicles will be compatible. At the northern terminus, the Walter Rand Transportation Center, paid transfers will be possible to the PATCO Speedline. The project's goal is to improve mobility and connect towns in Gloucester and Camden counties. The project was originally expected to be completed by 2019, but faced construction delays due to local pushback, lack of funding, and later the COVID-19 pandemic. An environmental assessment was published in February 2021, and it is now in the design and engineering phase. The project is projected to be operational by 2028.

==== Bus rapid transit ====
Bus rapid transit in New Jersey includes limited stop bus lines, exclusive bus lanes (XBL) and bus bypass shoulders (BBS). Next Generation Bus is the term used by NJT to refer to the development of numerous bus rapid transit (BRT) systems across the state which are being studied by the agency, NJDOT, the metropolitan planning organizations of New Jersey (MPO), and contract bus carriers. In 2011, NJT announced that it would equip its entire bus fleet with real-time location, creating the basis for "next bus" scheduling information at bus shelters and web-enabled devices and considered an important feature of BRT.

==== Recovery and Resilience Projects ====
As of 2018, there are several projects in progress. A project to replace the auxiliary power cables, traction power, and signal and communication devices along the HBLR that were affected by Hurricane Sandy was in the works. Repairs to Hoboken Terminal are said to be complete by 2020. Numerous power line, power system, and flood protection systems were in progress or completed at numerous terminals and stations. The 110-year old Raritan Bay Drawbridge is said to be replaced by a new, higher lift bridge.

=== Proposed projects ===
==== West Trenton ====
The West Trenton Line is a proposed commuter rail service connecting West Trenton station in Ewing Township with the Raritan Valley Line in Bridgewater, with a connection to Newark Penn Station. In 2007, NJ Transit estimated the project's cost at $219 million, although funding had not been identified. NJ Transit's 2021 capital plan included a feasibility study to evaluate the restoration of passenger service on the CSX-owned line. The project was also included among potential transit expansion projects in New Jersey's draft Statewide Transportation Improvement Program for fiscal years 2026–2035. Passenger service on the line ended in 1982

==== West Shore Commuter Rail Line ====
The West Shore Route is a proposal to reactivate passenger service on the New Jersey-New York section of the West Shore Railroad from Hoboken, NJ to West Nyack, NY. The project has been included in the NJ Transit's portion of the federally-designated Metropolitan Planning Organization, the North Jersey Transportation Planning Authority's Transportation Improvement Program (TIP) for the fiscal years of 2016–2019. The route holds perhaps the greatest promise in all of New Jersey since it travels through the heart of NJ Transit Bus Operations' Midtown "commuter shed", with four bus routes (165, 167, 168 & 177) running well beyond capacity. Issues regarding the restart of commuter rail service include:

- CSX owns the trackage and uses them heavily to link the NYC area to their national network at Selkirk Yard in upstate New York.
- CSX offers to allow NJ Transit use of the ROW if the agency constructed sound barriers along the entire length of track for commuter operations out of its own pocket.
- A city terminal is not connected to this line, since the Weehawken & Pavonia Terminals were demolished decades ago. A loop connecting this line with the North River Tunnels into New York Penn Station where the West Shore Tracks pass under the Northeast Corridor just south of NJ Route 3 and Tonnelle Ave would directly connect this line into New York Penn Station. This configuration would provide a 25-minute travel time to New York Penn Station, but would bypass Secaucus Junction, leaving the West Shore with no transfer connection to the rest of New Jersey other than a possible transfer station on Tonnelle Ave with the Hudson Bergen Light Rail.

With these considerable technical issues, as well as no available space in New York Penn Station for West Shore Line trains, this proposal was put on hold until capacity into New York Penn Station will increase in the future.

The leadership of the municipalities along the route have been organizing for decades to get service running again and have been rezoning the areas around the former train stations ever since being told by NJ Transit that the number of projected riders is too low to justify investment.

==== Passaic–Bergen–Hudson Transit Project ====
The Passaic–Bergen–Hudson Transit Project would reintroduce passenger service on the New York, Susquehanna and Western Railway right-of-way in Passaic, Bergen and Hudson counties between Hawthorne and Hackensack, as well as extending service to connect to the Hudson–Bergen Light Rail in North Bergen. The project is currently in its initial study phase.

==== Monmouth-Ocean-Middlesex (MOM) ====
The Monmouth-Ocean-Middlesex (MOM) line is a proposed south and central New Jersey commuter rail route to New Brunswick, Newark and New York's Penn Station. This would restore service previously provided by the Central Railroad of New Jersey with similar station sequences. Prior to the 1941 cancellation, the CNJ operated Blue Comet trains (Jersey City-Atlantic City) and some local trains on this route.

The line was originally proposed by the Ocean County Board of Chosen Freeholders in March 1980. It would run on a 40.1-mile rail corridor and would provide diesel commuter rail service from Monmouth Junction (South Brunswick), where the Jamesburg Branch partially joins the Northeast Corridor (NEC), south to Lakehurst in the interior of northern Ocean County. As of 2006, the line was opposed by Jamesburg and Monroe Township.

From Monmouth Junction the line would continue southeast to Jamesburg, Monroe, Englishtown, Manalapan, Freehold Borough, Freehold Township, Howell and Farmingdale. A new rail connection would be required in Farmingdale. It would proceed southward from Farmingdale to Lakehurst, passing through Howell, Lakewood, Jackson, Toms River, Townships, and Lakehurst/Manchester. Trains would also operate on the NEC between Monmouth Junction and Newark. Passengers for New York would transfer at Newark. Eight new stations and a train storage yard would be constructed.

In mid-February 2008, New Jersey Governor Jon Corzine withdrew the Monmouth Junction alignment from the MOM Plan. Corzine opted to endorse the two remaining alternate alignments (via Red Bank or Matawan-Freehold, the latter which is currently part of the Henry Hudson Rail Trail). NJT is still planning to study all the routes as to not delay action further on the EIS, and says all three routes are still up for evaluation, although it will take the Governor's comments into consideration.

In late May 2009, representatives of the three counties agreed to back one potential route from Ocean County to Red Bank, instead of to Monmouth Junction, ending years of stalemate. Under that compromise, the line's southern terminus would be in Lakehurst, and it would run through Lakewood along existing freight tracks to join the North Jersey Coast Line in Red Bank. It also includes the possibility of a spur between Freehold and Farmingdale.

In August 2010, NJT received $534,375 in Federal Funds to investigate the possibilities of a MOM line. Since that time there has been no further advancement of the project. The inertia is partially attributed to the cancellation of the Access to the Region's Core project.

==== Lehigh Valley ====
In November 2008, the Lehigh Valley Economic Development Corporation (LVEDC), along with both Lehigh and Northampton counties, commissioned a study to explore extending the Raritan Valley Line to the Lehigh Valley region of eastern Pennsylvania, which would potentially include stops in Allentown, Bethlehem and Easton. This would resume passenger service previously provided jointly by the Lehigh Valley Railroad and the Central Railroad of New Jersey. These cities were last served in 1967.

=== Canceled projects ===
==== Access to the Region's Core ====
NJT intended to construct a new two-track Hudson River tunnel adjacent to the two single-track Northeast Corridor tunnels built in the early 20th century by the Pennsylvania Railroad. NJT referred to the project as Access to the Region's Core, which would have used dual-power locomotives and a new rail junction at Secaucus, allowing for a one-train ride between the Port Jervis, Main, Bergen County, Pascack Valley, and Raritan Valley lines and New York Penn Station. The Lehigh and the West Trenton extension plans would require added capacity and the ARC project would provide that capacity.

The project broke ground in June 2009. Both the Federal Transit Administration and the Port Authority made public commitments of $3 billion to the project. However, the project was suspended on October 7, 2010, due to concerns that the State of New Jersey would be solely responsible for projected $5 billion in overruns. On October 27, 2010, Governor Chris Christie made a final decision to cancel the project. Amtrak later unveiled the Gateway Project, which addresses some of the issues ARC was meant to resolve.

==== Newark–Elizabeth Rail Link ====
Planned to connect Downtown Newark and Elizabeth via Newark Liberty International Airport, NJT is no longer pursuing the Newark–Elizabeth Rail Link. The airport has a monorail link to NJT's Northeast Corridor Line and Amtrak's Northeast Corridor, both of which run to both Newark and Elizabeth.

== Incidents ==
- In December 1985, a train crashed into a concrete bumper in Hoboken Terminal, injuring 54 people. The cause was a lubricant that was applied onto the tracks to test the train wheels.
- On February 9, 1996, NJ Transit Bergen County Line train 1254 collided nearly head-on with Main Line train 1107 near Secaucus. Both trains' engineers and a passenger were killed. The collision was caused when the eastbound train ran a red signal due to the unreported color blindness of the engineer of train 1254.
- On July 14, 2003, a Northeast Corridor train derailed just east of the Portal Bridge in Secaucus during the morning rush hour disrupting service on the Northeast Corridor for nearly 12 hours. Amtrak service was terminated at Newark during this time. All of NJ Transit's Northeast Corridor, North Jersey Coast and Morris and Essex trains were diverted to Hoboken Terminal. The cause of the derailment was a lost wheel on one of the Arrow III cars causing NJ Transit to temporarily take all 230 Arrow III cars out of service for inspection. They were all deemed safe and returned to service days later.
- On February 21, 2007, a Bergen County Line train suffered a minor derailment after passing over an improperly repaired switch at Ridgewood Junction.
- On the morning of September 29, 2016, a Pascack Valley Line train failed to slow down as it approached Hoboken Terminal and crashed into the passenger concourse. One person died, with around 100 people being injured.
- On August 19, 2016, two New Jersey Transit buses collided in Newark on Broad St & Raymond Blvd during the morning commute. Bus 5612, operating on route no. 59 with no passengers, ran a red light, colliding with bus 5784, running was on route 13, which was crossing the road safely. Two people died and 18 were injured in the crash. The driver of 5612 died at the scene. A passenger onboard bus 5784 was also pronounced dead at the scene.
- On the morning of December 14, 2023, a Texas Longhorn bull wandered onto the train tracks at Newark Penn Station. Onlookers notified officials, leading to paused service and train delays of up to 45 minutes. Newark Police Emergency Services and the Port Authority Police Department contained the animal, later named Ricardo after one of the police officers who helped corral him to safety. On December 19, 2023, NJ Transit released an official Ricardo the Bull 6-inch plushie to commemorate the incident. The plushie was available for pre-order on the NJ Transit Shoppe for $20 and sold out shortly after release. A portion of the proceeds for the plushie would go Skylands Animal Sanctuary & Rescue in Sussex County, where Ricardo was transported after the incident.
- On October 14, 2024, a light rail train collided with a tree on the River Line. One person was killed and 23 people were injured.
- On December 19, 2025, NJ Transit Montclair-Boonton Line train 1079 collided with train 1055 in Montclair, NJ. Both trains derailed and the collision resulted in 17 non-life threatening injuries
- On October 8, 2026, an NJ Transit bus with no passengers operating the 166 crashed into a home in Englewood. The driver was injured and then hospitalized; the bus was later removed after gas and electric inspections.

== See also ==
- George Warrington
- James Weinstein
- AirTrain Newark
- List of New Jersey railroads
- List of United States railroads
- Metropolitan Transportation Authority
- Sunnyside Yard
