= List of dams and reservoirs in New Jersey =

This is a list of dams and reservoirs in New Jersey.

All major dams are linked below. The National Inventory of Dams defines any "major dam" as being 50 feet (15 m) tall with a storage capacity of at least 5,000 acre-feet (6,200,000 m^{3}), or of any height with a storage capacity of 25,000 acre-feet (31,000,000 m^{3}).

== Dams and reservoirs in New Jersey ==
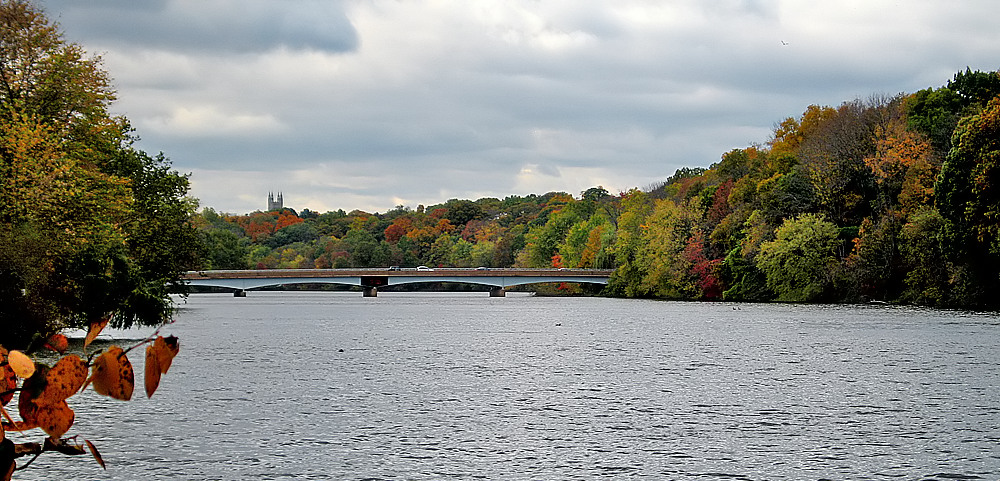
Lake Carnegie, Princeton University

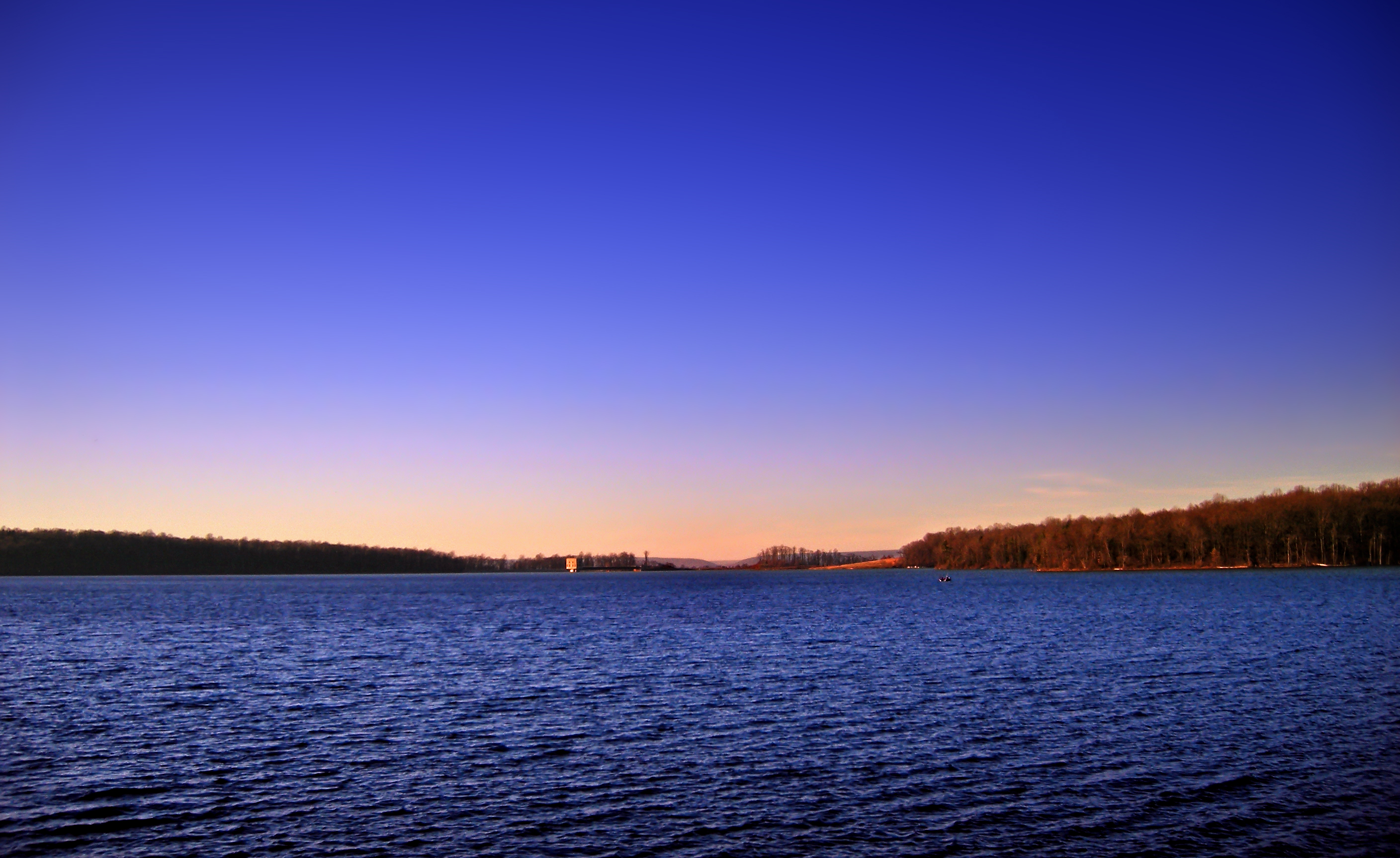
Merrill Creek Reservoir

This list is incomplete. You can help Wikipedia by expanding it.

- Beatties Dam, Passaic River Little Falls
- Brick Township Reservoir, Brick Township Municipal Utilities Authority
- Butler Reservoir, Passaic County
- Clyde Potts Reservoir, Mendham Township, Southeast Morris County Municipal Utilities Authority
- Colonial Lake, Lawrence Township
- Dundie Dam, Passaic River
- Furry Lake, East Brunswick and North Brunswick
- Furnace Road Dam, Wanaque Reservoir, North Jersey District Water Supply Authority
- Hackensack Reservoir No. 2, United Water New Jersey
- Jersey City Reservoir No. 3
- Lake Carnegie Dam, Lake Carnegie, Princeton University
- Lake Hopatcong Dam, Lake Hopatcong, New Jersey Division Of Parks And Forestry
- Lake Musconetcong Dam. Lake Musconetcong
- Lake Tappan Dam, Lake Tappan, United Water New Jersey
- Manasquan Reservoir Dam, Manasquan Reservoir, New Jersey Water Supply Authority
- Mercer Lake, Mercer County Park
- Merrill Creek Dam, Merrill Creek Reservoir, Merrill Creek Owners Group
- Monksville Dam, Monksville Reservoir, North Jersey District Water Supply
- Oradell Reservoir Dam, Oradell Reservoir, United Water New Jersey
- Parsippany Dike, Boonton Reservoir (Jersey City Reservoir), Jersey City Department of Water
- Point View Dam, Point View Reservoir, Passaic Valley Water Commission
- multiple dams, Round Valley Reservoir, New Jersey Water Supply Authority
- Shadow Lake Dam, on Nut Swamp Brook in Monmouth County
- S.U.M. Dam, Passaic River Paterson
- Spruce Run Reservoir Dam, Spruce Run Reservoir, New Jersey Water Supply Authority
- Lake Sylva, The College of New Jersey
- Woodcliff Lake Dam, Woodcliff Lake Reservoir, United Water New Jersey
- Yards Creek Generating Station, upper and lower reservoirs
- Clinton Reservoir West Milford New Jersey

== See also ==
- List of dam removals in New Jersey
