= Lake DeForest =

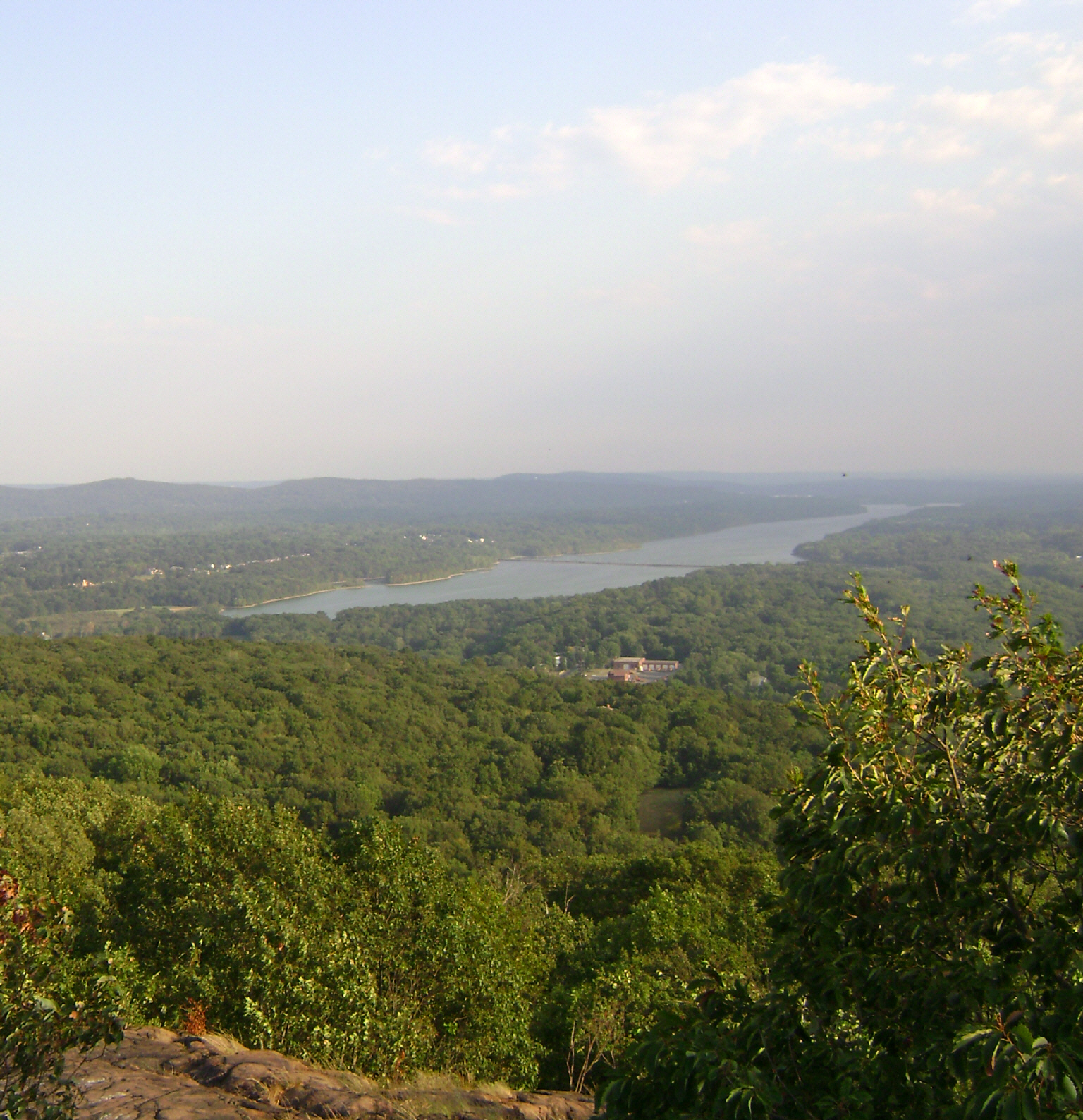
- Lake DeForest viewed from nearby High Tor, a summit of the northern Hudson River Palisades.

- Location within New York Location within the United States
- Location: Clarkstown, New York, United States
- Coordinates: 41°09′21″N 73°57′30″W
- Type: Reservoir
- Primary inflows: Hackensack River
- Basin countries: Newark Basin; United States
- Surface area: 744 acres (301 ha)
- Surface elevation: 79 ft (24 m)

Lake DeForest, also called DeForest Lake, is a reservoir in Clarkstown, New York, created in 1956 by impounding the Hackensack River, which is a principal part of the water supply for Rockland County, New York and Northern New Jersey, mainly Bergen and Hudson counties. The reservoir is owned and operated by Suez North America, and is the most upstream of its reservoirs along the river's watershed, the others being Lake Tappan, the Woodcliff Lake Reservoir, and the Oradell Reservoir. It has a storage capacity of 5.6 billion gallons. Swimming and bathing are prohibited because the water is reserved for potable use. The lake is traversed by a causeway carrying Congers Road (CR 80).

== History ==
The lake was developed in 1956 by an interstate partnership of the Hackensack Water Company (of New Jersey) and the Spring Valley Water Company (of Spring Valley, New York), to provide water on both sides of the state line.

Adrian Leiby's monograph, The Hackensack Water Company, 1869-1969, describes the conception of the lake (owing chiefly to George F. Wieghardt, chief engineer from 1938 to 1954); the sense that the proposed lake needed to be built soon, before any ill-advised new housing developments on the swampy lowlands would preclude it; and unrest among the public fueled by fears the proposed lake was a plan by New Jersey thieves to steal water from New York state or to create miles of "smelly mud flats" in Clarkstown. By the time of a severe drought in 1963-65, Leiby noted, public approval of the attractive lake and the water security it provided was nearly universal; writing in 1969, he said, "Twelve years later it is hard to believe that there is a single person in the County who would willingly see DeForest Lake drained and its land filled with development houses."

The lake is named after Henry L. deForest, president of Hackensack Water Company from 1936 to 1950, under whose presidency the lake was conceived; at the time that the completed lake was dedicated on March 13, 1957, Henry L. deForest had recently died. Henry's father, Robert W. DeForest, had led the Hackensack Water Company from 1881 to 1926.

The Hackensack Water Company and the Spring Valley Water Company had long cooperated, the former being a chief stockholder of the latter; they were merged into United Water Resources in the 1980s, which was later acquired by Suez North America.

== See also ==
- List of dams and reservoirs in New York
- New Milford Plant of the Hackensack Water Company
- Hackensack Water Company Complex
- List of crossings of the Hackensack River
- List of dams and reservoirs in New Jersey
