= PATH Lift Bridge =

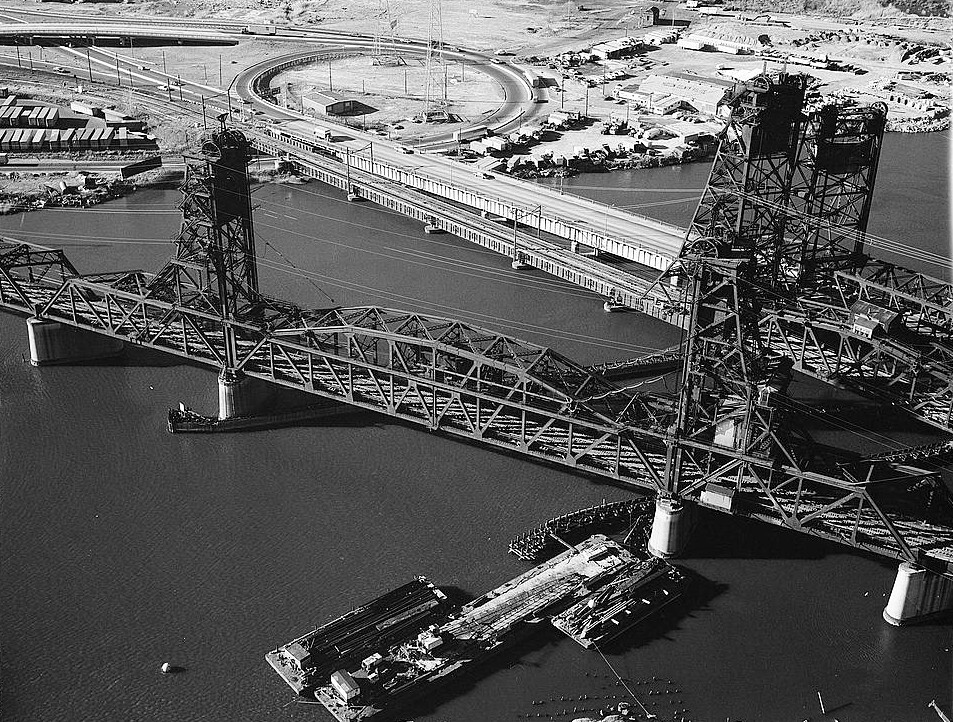
- PATH Lift Bridge (Harsimus Branch and Wittpenn Bridge at right)
- Coordinates: 40.740108°N 74.083048°W
- Carries: PATH
- Crosses: Hackensack River
- Locale: Connecting Kearny and Jersey City, New Jersey
- Owner: Port Authority of New York and New Jersey

Characteristics
- Design: Lift bridge
- Material: Steel

History
- Opened: 1900; 125 years ago

The PATH Lift is a lift bridge carrying the Port Authority Trans-Hudson (PATH) rapid transit line across the Hackensack River between Kearny and Jersey City, New Jersey. It is used by PATH trains going to and from Newark.

== History ==
The bridge was built by the Pennsylvania Railroad (PRR) in 1900. It was part of the PRR main line that terminated at Exchange Place in Jersey City. Upon the opening of the PRR North River Tunnels to Manhattan's Penn Station in 1910, the main line traffic was routed on a new alignment to the tunnels, and the Exchange Place line tracks were made available to the Hudson and Manhattan Railroad, a rapid transit line to lower Manhattan (later called PATH). Service on a new H&M line between the Manhattan Transfer station in Harrison, New Jersey and lower Manhattan began on October 1, 1911. The service was later extended southward to Newark.

Use of the bridge was shared by the PRR and H&M until PRR closed Exchange Place in 1961. Since that time, it has been used solely by H&M/PATH trains on the Newark–World Trade Center line (known as Newark-Hudson Terminal before 1971).

== See also ==
- List of bridges documented by the Historic American Engineering Record in New Jersey
- List of bridges, tunnels, and cuts in Hudson County, New Jersey
- List of crossings of the Hackensack River
