= Woodcliff Lake Reservoir =

Reservoir in New Jersey, United States

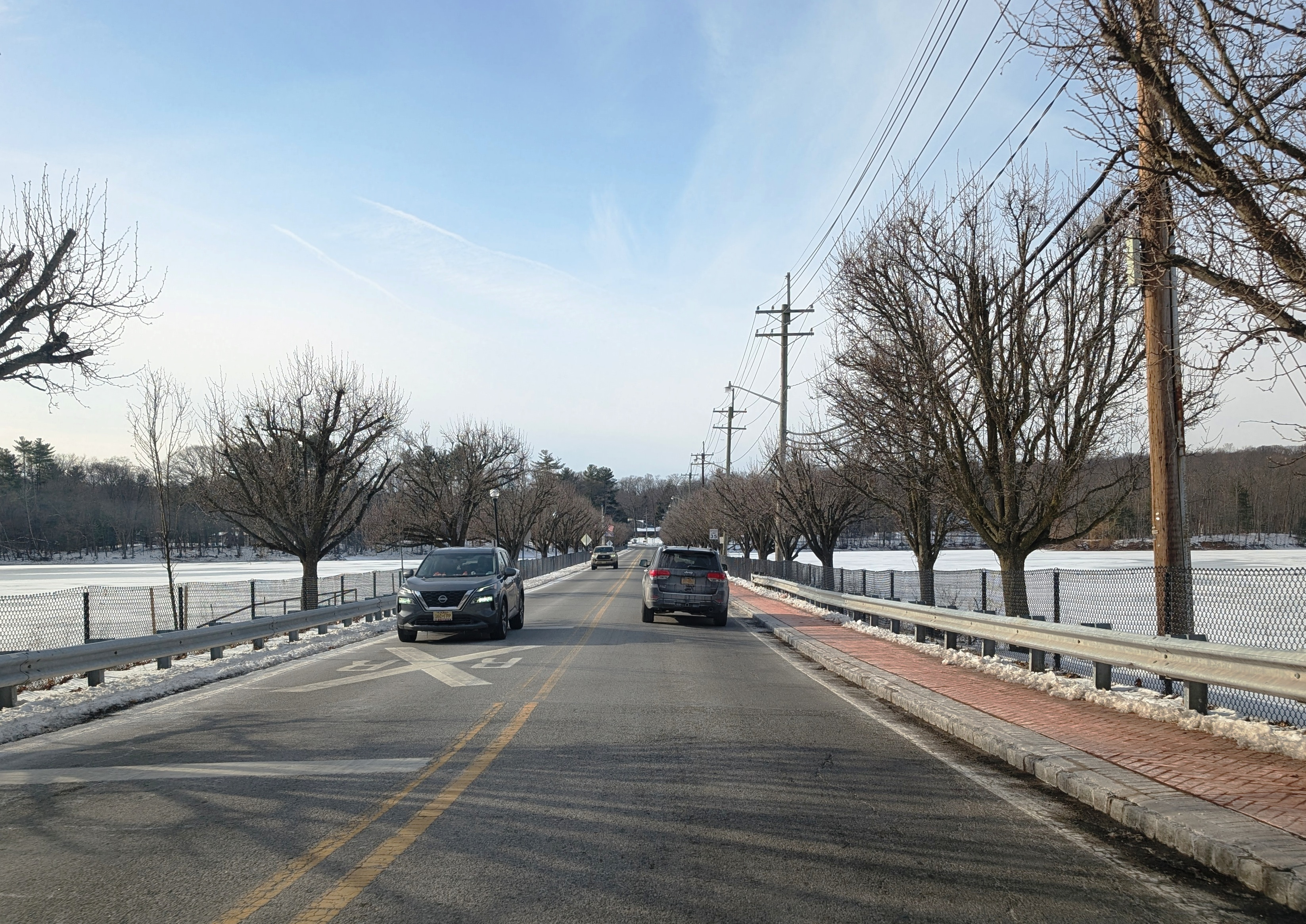
- Crossing the reservoir on Woodcliff Avenue westbound pictured, January 2025

- Location within New Jersey Location within the United States
- Location: Bergen County, New Jersey, United States
- Coordinates: 41.019089°N 74.043388°W
- Lake type: Reservoir
- Primary inflows: Pascack Brook, Bear Brook
- Primary outflows: Pascack Brook
- Basin countries: United States
- Surface area: 152.38 acres (0.6167 km^{2})
- Water volume: 871,000,000 US gal (3,300,000 m^{3})
- Surface elevation: 98 ft (30 m)

Woodcliff Lake is a reservoir in the New Jersey borough of Woodcliff Lake and portions of Hillsdale and Park Ridge, in Bergen County, United States. It was created circa 1903 by damming the Pascack Brook and is also fed by the Bear Brook which joins the Pascack at the reservoir. The creation of the lake led what had been the Borough of Woodcliff to change its name to Woodcliff Lake, to match the name of the new reservoir. The reservoir is owned by Suez North America, a private utility.

== Description ==
The reservoir has a capacity of approximately 871 million US gallons (3,300,000 m^{3}) of water. Water released into the Pascack Brook flows downstream into the Oradell Reservoir. When the water levels become low, the old stone bridge over the Pascack Brook becomes visible just south of the causeway.

Several species of fish inhabit the reservoir including largemouth bass, smallmouth bass, carp, pumpkinseed, bluegill, brown and yellow bullheads, as well as large schools of both yellow and white perch. Fishing is restricted to those with a valid New Jersey Fishing License and a Watershed Permit obtained by payment of a yearly fee to the owner of the reservoir, Suez North America. Numerous waterfowl including various species of ducks and heron also live on and around the reservoir.

The reservoir may be crossed at two points, either by a narrow road over the dam, originally Dam Road and changed to Church Road when Christ Lutheran Church was built at the Pascack Road entrance, or a higher traffic county road over a causeway, Woodcliff Avenue. On the eastern side of the reservoir is the New Jersey Transit Pascack Valley Line, with the Woodcliff Lake station at Woodcliff Avenue.

On March 11, 2003, Governor of New Jersey Jim McGreevey visited the nearby Lake Tappan reservoir and proposed protecting it, Woodcliff Lake and their tributaries with Category 1 water purity status.

== See also ==
- Lake DeForest
- List of dams and reservoirs in New Jersey
- New Milford Plant of the Hackensack Water Company
- Hackensack Water Company Complex
