= Woodcliff Lake =

Woodcliff Lake may refer to:

- Woodcliff Lake, New Jersey, a borough
- Woodcliff Lake Reservoir, mostly in the New Jersey municipality
