= Dwars Kill =

River in the United States of America

Coordinates: 40°59′01″N 73°56′42″W

The Dwars Kill (also known as Dwarskill or Dwarskill Creek) is a tributary of the Hackensack River (Oradell Reservoir) in Bergen County, New Jersey, in the United States. The name is taken from the Dutch language and can be translated as "Cross Creek".

== See also ==
- List of rivers of New Jersey
