= Bear Brook (Pascack Brook tributary) =

River in New Jersey, United States

Coordinates: 41.031197°N 74.052916°W

Bear Brook is a tributary of Pascack Brook in New Jersey. It is a Category One waterrway.

It joins with the Pascack at the Woodcliff Lake Reservoir and forms part of the border between Park Ridge and Woodcliff Lake. The brook flows through portions of Bergen County in New Jersey and its headwaters lay in Rockland County, New York.

In Park Ridge, a park named Atkins Glen surrounds a portion of the brook and is home to several shallow caverns, in some of which Native American artifacts have been found.

== See also ==
- List of rivers of New Jersey
