= Musquapsink Brook =

River in New Jersey, United States

Musquapsink Brook is a tributary of Pascack Brook in Bergen County, New Jersey in the United States.

The headwater lies within Woodcliff Lake and runs south through Hillsdale and into Washington Township. There it runs into Schlegel Lake before continuing south and east into Westwood. In Westwood, it runs into Bogert Pond before briefly turning north and joining the Pascack Brook at the border between Westwood and River Vale.

At least one late 18th-century map labels Musquapsink Brook "Little Pascack River" (the modern Pascack Brook is shown as "Great Pascack River").

== See also ==
- List of rivers of New Jersey
