= Wittpenn Bridge =

Bridge in New Jersey, US

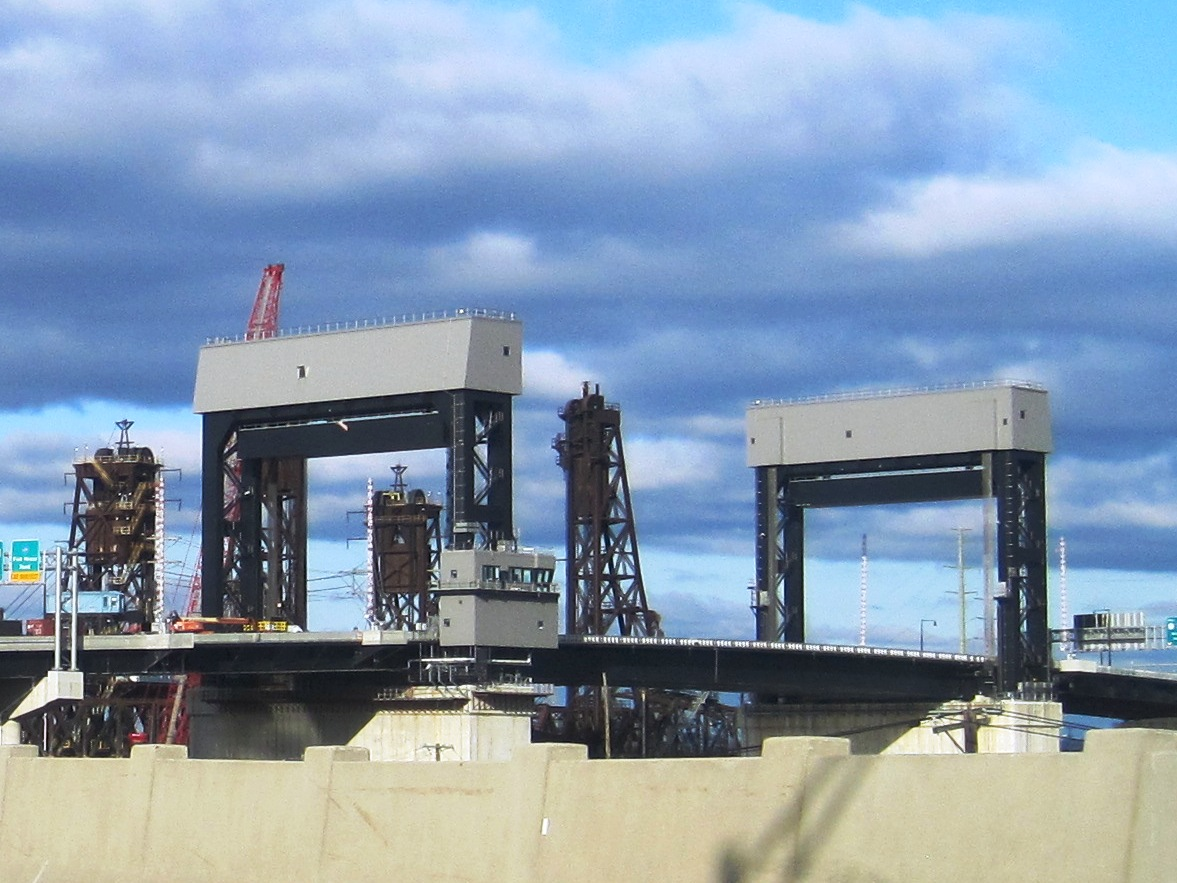
- The current span of the Wittpenn Bridge as seen in April 2022
- Coordinates: 40.740625°N 74.081336°W
- Carries: Route 7 Future East Coast Greenway
- Crosses: Hackensack River
- Locale: Jersey City and Kearny, New Jersey
- Official name: Wittpenn Bridge
- Other name(s): Route 7 Bridge
- Maintained by: New Jersey Department of Transportation
- ID number: 0909150

Characteristics
- Design: Lift bridge
- Total length: 2,169 feet (661 m)
- Width: 40 feet (12 m)
- Longest span: 83 feet (25 m)
- Clearance below: 35 feet (11 m) (lowered); 100 feet (30 m) (raised)

History
- Opened: November 5, 1930 (original bridge) October 2, 2021 (replacement bridge)

The Wittpenn Bridge is a vertical-lift bridge that carries New Jersey Route 7 over the Hackensack River in Jersey City and Kearny, in Hudson County, New Jersey. It is named after H. Otto Wittpenn, a former mayor of Jersey City. The bridge has an annual average daily traffic (AADT) of nearly 50,000 vehicles, including about 2,000 trucks. In 2005, the bridge was raised 80 times to accommodate boats passing underneath. The original span opened in 1930; its replacement opened in 2021.

== Original structure ==
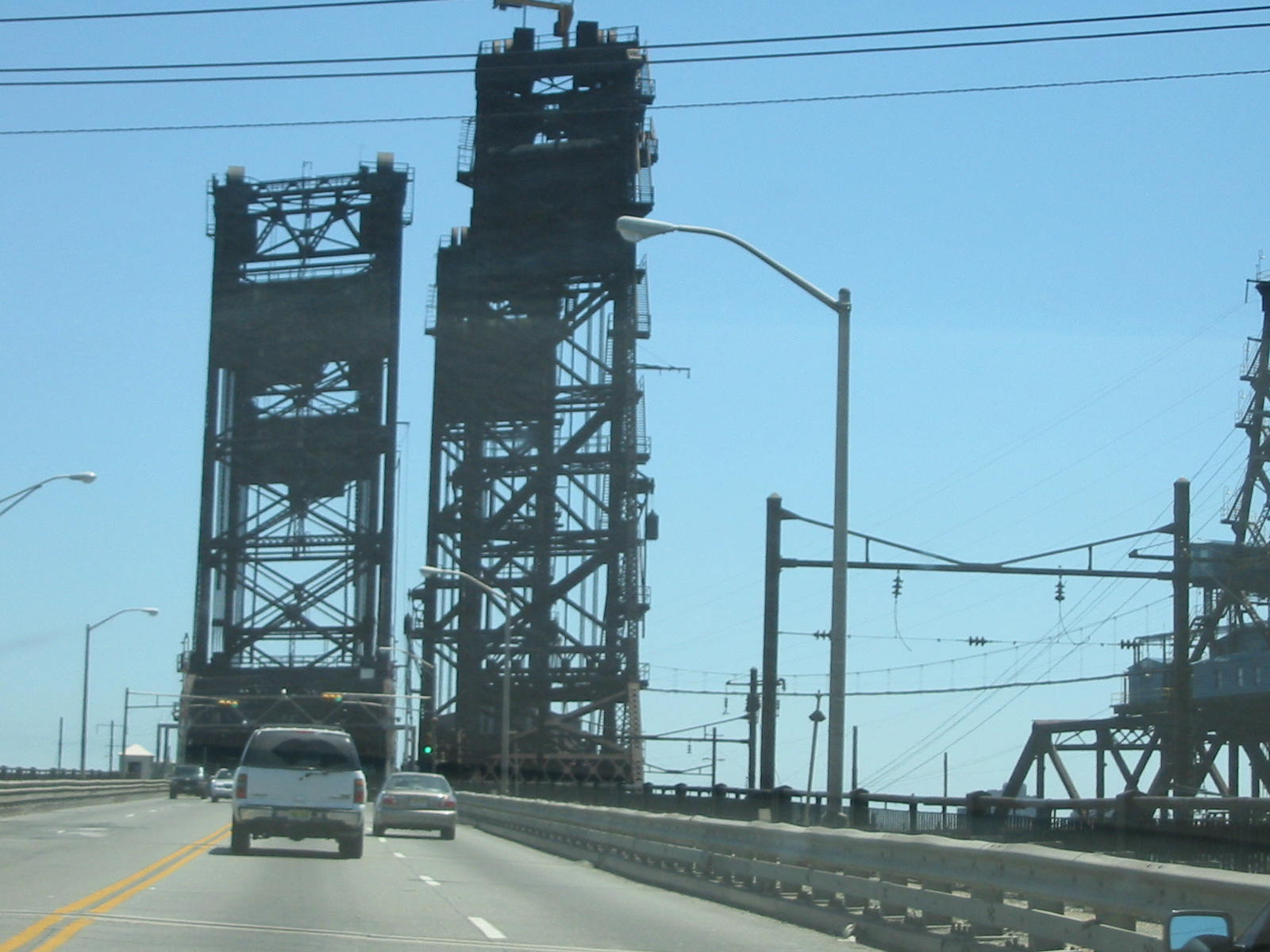
The original Wittpenn Bridge, looking east in a 2004 photo

The original bridge carried four 10-foot-wide (3.0 m) lanes, extended 2,169 feet (661 m) and stood 35 feet (11 m) above mean high water with a 209-foot (64 m) main lift span. Bridge construction commenced in 1927, and it was opened to vehicular traffic on November 5, 1930. When raised, the bridge provided 100 feet (30 m) of clearance for ships. Raising the lift span required 15 minutes. Following the opening of the 2021 span, demolition work commenced on this span with work being substantially complete by March 2022.

== Replacement ==
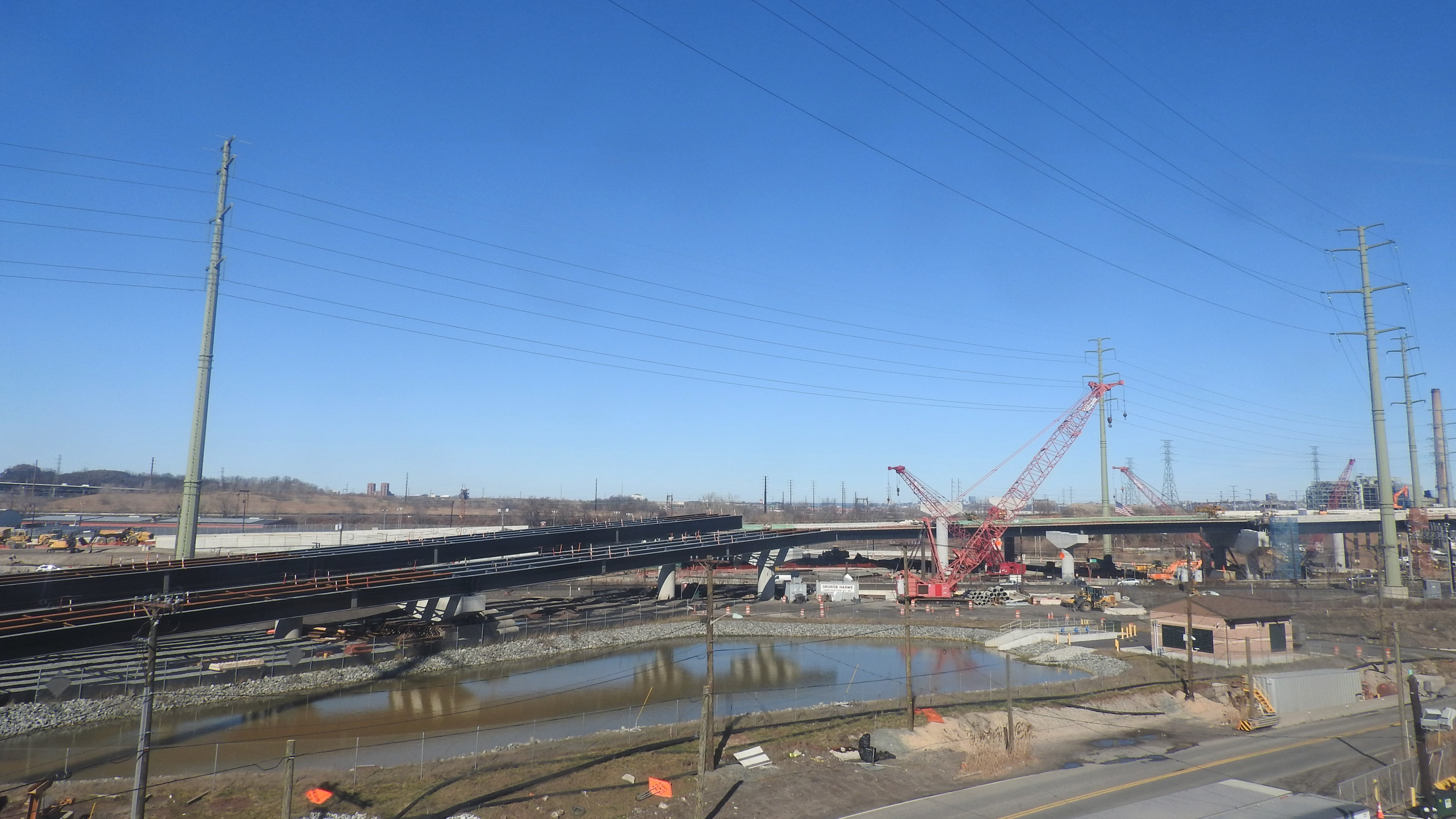
New bridge approach in Kearny, 2020

The New Jersey Department of Transportation (NJDOT) replaced the Wittpenn Bridge and all its approach ramps (including connections to U.S. Route 1/9), a project estimated to cost $600 million, funded by federal dollars. The first phase of construction began in July 2011. The new span opened in 2021, and all associated project work is expected to be completed in 2022. The new bridge is situated just north of the existing bridge.

The reconstruction of the bridge was partially funded by the Port Authority of New York and New Jersey. In November 2018, the Federal Aviation Agency (FAA) investigated a complaint raised by United Airlines that the fees they were paying for Newark Airport use were being diverted to roadway and bridge projects such as the Wittpenn Bridge which are not owned or operated by the Port Authority.

In October 2020 the third and final section of the orthotropic bridge deck was hoisted into place, partially built on the former overpass that carried U.S. Route 1/9 Truck, which now carries both routes instead. The bridge opened on October 2, 2021.

In addition to Route 7, the new span will carry the East Coast Greenway, a long-distance biking and walking trail, and the Meadowlands Connector, a New Jersey biking and walking trail that links Hudson and Essex counties.

== See also ==
- List of crossings of the Hackensack River
