= Pascack Brook County Park =

Park in New Jersey

Coordinates: 40.9888°N 74.0113°W

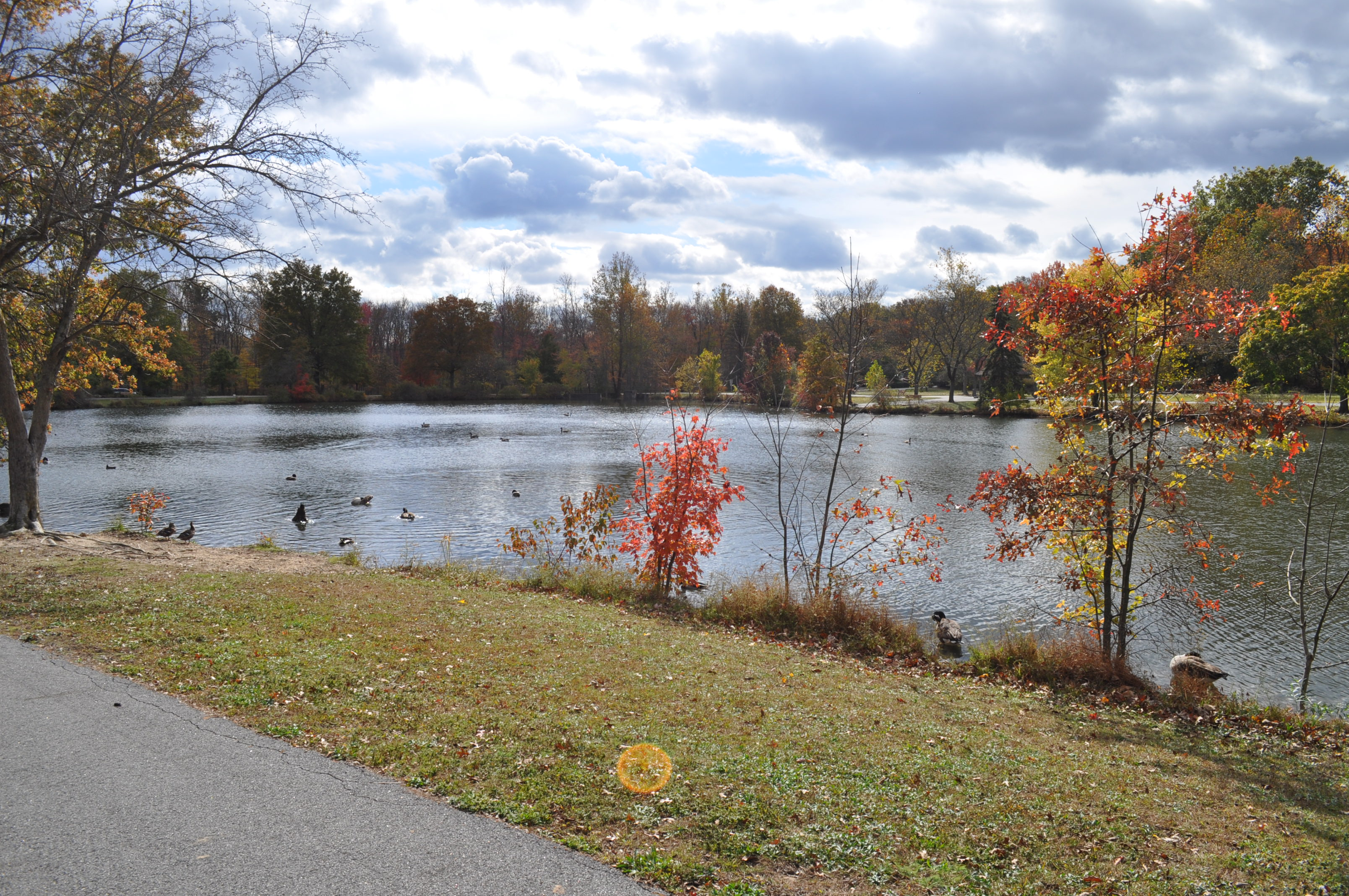
- Interactive map of Pascack Brook County Park
- Type: County park
- Location: Westwood, New Jersey
- Area: 137 acres (55 ha)
- Operator: Bergen County Department of Parks
- Status: Open all year

Pascack Brook County Park, 137 acre (55.4 hectare) county park, is located on Emerson Road in Westwood, New Jersey, about a mile (1.6 km) east of Westwood (NJT station) and half a mile upstream from the mouth of Pascack Brook. From intersection of Old Hook Road and Emerson Road, travel north on Emerson Road - entrance is on the left (west side of Emerson Road).

== Facilities ==
Pascack Brook County Park has two picnic areas, one baseball field, one softball field, playground, basketball court, tennis courts, a bike path, and fishing.
