= Pascack Brook =

River in New Jersey, United States

Coordinates: 40.984045°N 74.003649°W

Pascack Brook is a tributary of the Hackensack River in Bergen County, New Jersey, United States.

== History ==
At least one late 18th-century map calls the brook "Great Pascack River." Its tributary Musquapsink Brook is shown as "Little Pascack River." The name "Pascack River" also occurs in an 1876 map of the area.

== Course and watershed ==
Pascack Brook forms a region known as the Pascack Valley. The brook is dammed to form the Woodcliff Lake Reservoir in the town of Woodcliff Lake and Mill Pond (aka Silver Lake) in Park Ridge, New Jersey. The Pascack formerly flowed directly into the Hackensack River, but now ends at the Oradell Reservoir short of its historical juncture with the Hackensack.

A dam on Pascack Brook in Spring Valley, New York, impounded Lake Hyenga until it collapsed during Hurricane Floyd in September 1999. Heavy flooding resulted downstream. The dam was not rebuilt.

== Tributaries ==
(Listed from mouth to source)

- Musquapsink Brook
- Tandy Brook
- Bear Brook
- Mill Brook
- Muddy Brook

== See also ==
- List of rivers of New Jersey
- Pascack Brook County Park
