= List of crossings of the Hackensack River =

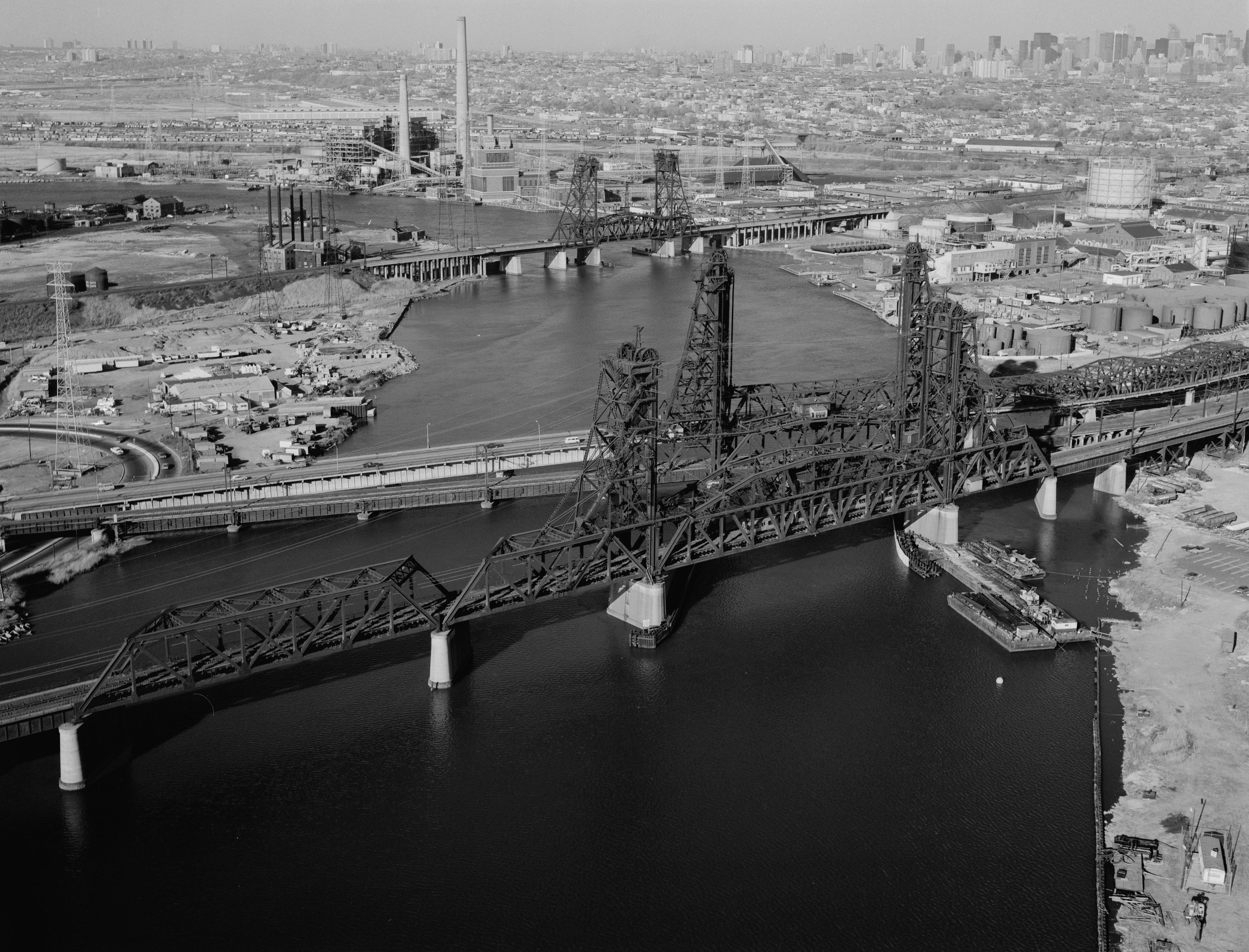
Bridges at the lower end of the Hackensack River and the Lower Hack Lift just upstream from the clustered Wittpenn Bridge, the Harsimus Branch Lift, and PATH Lift (foreground), collectively known as the "Triple Bridges" or "Tri Hack".

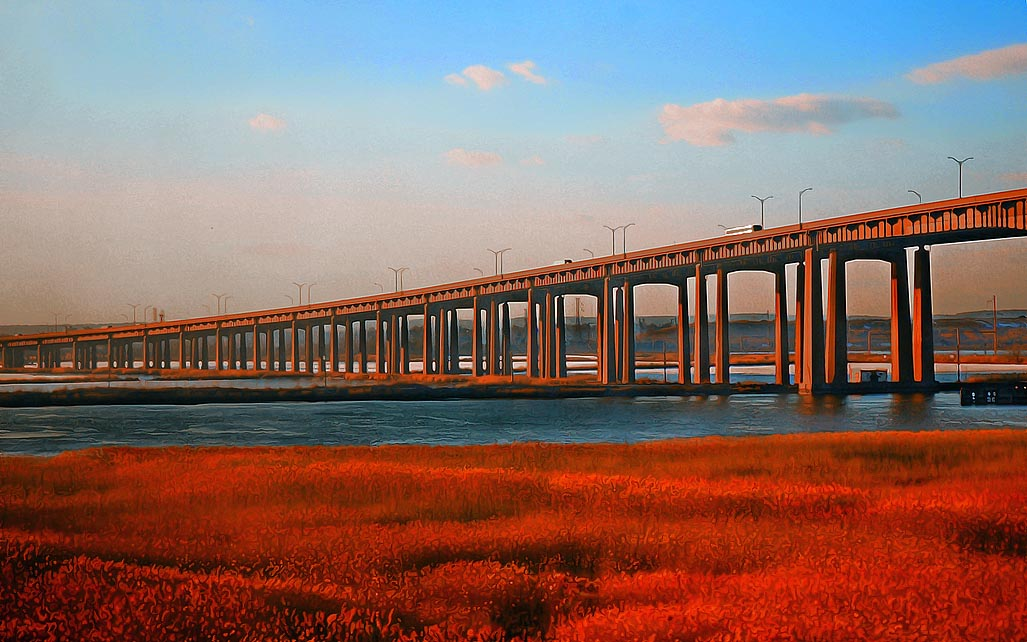
The New Jersey Turnpike in the New Jersey Meadowlands in January 2007

The Hackensack River courses southward for approximately 50 miles (80 km) in Rockland County, New York in the north and Bergen and Hudson counties in northeastern New Jersey to the south, forming the border of the latter two for part of its length. Its source is in New City, New York. The river empties into Newark Bay between Kearny Point in South Kearny and Droyer's Point in Jersey City.

The area was settled by Bergen Dutch who established regular water crossings at Douwe's Ferry and Little Ferry. The first bridge crossing of the Hackensack was at Demarest Landing (now Old Bridge Road), built in 1724, which was replaced by that at New Bridge Landing in 1745. The first railroad crossing was completed by the NJRR in 1834, and was soon followed by many others. By the early 1900s conflicts between rail and maritime traffic led to calls for changes in regulations giving priority to trains.

At one time, Van Buskirk Island, created in 1804, was the head of navigation, but freshwater flow in the Hackensack has been diminished by construction of dams, namely the Oradell (1923), the DeForest (1952), and the Tappan (1972). The river is now tidally influenced to the island. The Hackensack has only been channelized to Milepoint 3.5 at the Riverbend in Hudson County. The accumulation of silt has diminished the depth, and thus navigability, of the Lower Hackensack. which at one time was a major waterway for towboats and river barges in the Port of New York and New Jersey.

Since 1999, the bridge at Milepoint 16.3 is the most upstream bridge required by the Code of Federal Regulations to open on request, though no requests have made since 1994. The Lower Hackensack remains partially in use for commercial maritime traffic, notably for sewage sludge for treatment at a facility on the bay. (Coal deliveries to the Hudson Generating Station ended upon the facilities closure). Downstream of the power plant site, vehicular moveable bridges (at MP 1.8 and MP 3.1) are required at all times to open on demand. and rail crossings to open on 1-hour notice. New crossings included the replacement the Wittpenn Bridge, a vehicular bridge at MP 3.1 with a new vertical lift bridge and replacement the Portal Bridge, a rail swing bridge at MP 5.0, with a through arch bridge called Portal North Bridge

== Crossings ==
Mile	Crossing	Image	Carried/Carries	Location	Coordinates	Notes
	HD Draw (defunct)		Newark and New York Branch (CNJ)	Jersey City & Kearny Point	40°43′07″N 74°06′14″W	
1.7	Newark Plank Road (defunct)		PS	Jersey City & Kearny Point	40°43′36″N 74°05′57″W	
1.8	Lincoln Highway Hackensack River Bridge (Shawn Carson and Robert Nguyen Memorial Bridge)		US 1-9 Truck milepoint 1.72; Lincoln Highway; East Coast Greenway	Jersey City & Kearny Point	40°43′38″N 74°05′55″W	
	Pulaski Skyway		US 1-9 Truck	Jersey City & Kearny Point	40°44′06″N 74°05′42″W	
	PATH Lift Bridge		PRR and H&M; PATH	Jersey City & Kearny Meadows	40°44′24″N 74°04′59″W	
	Harsimus Branch Lift aka Hack Freight Railroad Bridge		PRR; Conrail (North Jersey Shared Assets) NS; CSX	Jersey City & Kearny Meadows	40°44′26″N 74°04′55″W	
3.1	Wittpenn Bridge		original alignment of the Newark Turnpike; Route 7	Jersey City & Kearny Meadows	40°44′25″N 74°04′52″W	
	Wittpenn Bridge			Jersey City & Kearny Meadows	40°44′28″N 74°04′53″W	
	New Jersey Railroad (defunct)		PRR	Jersey City & Kearny Meadows	40°44′28″N 74°04′53″W	
3.4	Lower Hack Lift		DL&W; Morris and Essex Lines (NJT)	Riverbend	40°44′36″N 74°04′37″W	
5.0	Portal Bridge		PRR; Northeast Corridor; Amtrak and NJT	Secaucus Junction & Kearny Meadows	40°45′13″N 74°05′41″W	
	Portal South South (planned)		Gateway Project	Secaucus Junction & Kearny Meadows		
	Portal North Bridge		Northeast Corridor; Gateway Project	Secaucus Junction & Kearny Meadows		
	Lewandowski Hackensack River Bridge		I-95 Toll / N.J. Turnpike (Eastern Spur)	Snake Hill & Kearny Meadows	40°45′36″N 74°05′41″W	
	DB Draw (unused)		New York and Greenwood Lake Railroad (Erie); Boonton Line (NJT); NS; Essex–Hudson Greenway	Snake Hill & Kearny Meadows	40°45′30″N 74°05′36″W	
6.9	Upper Hack Lift		DL&W Boonton Line (1959-1963); Erie/NJ Transit Main Line (NJT); Port Jervis Line (MNCR); MP 4.95	Harmon Cove & Kingsland	40°46′41″N 74°05′24″W	NJT #129
	Lackawanna Swing Bridge (defunct)		DL&W	Harmon Cove & Kingsland	40°46′41″N 74°05′24″W	
7.7	HX Draw aka The Jacknife		Bergen County Line (NJT); Pascack Valley Line (NJT); Meadowlands Rail Line (NJT); Port Jervis Line (MNCR) former Erie Main LineMP 5.48	Harmon Cove & Meadowlands Sports Complex	40°47′17″N 74°04′55″W	NJT #
	Route 3 East		Route 3	Secaucus & Meadowlands Sports Complex	40°47′55″N 74°04′08″W	
	Route 3 West (Medgar Evers Bridge)		Route 3	Secaucus & Meadowlands Sports Complex	40°48′02″N 74°04′01″W	
	Paterson Plank Road (defunct)		Jersey City, Hoboken and Rutherford Electric Railway; Public Service	Secaucus North End & Meadowlands Sports Complex	40°48′21″N 74°03′39″W	
	Western Spur Bridge		I-95 Toll / N.J. Turnpike (Western Spur)	Carlstadt & Ridgefield Park	40°49′23″N 74°02′04″W	
	Bergen Turnpike (aka Hackensack Plank Road) (defunct)		Public Service; CR 124	Ridgefield Park & Little Ferry	40°50′55″N 74°01′49″W	
14.0	Route 46 Hackensack River Bridge (aka S46 Bridge & Winant Avenue Bridge)		US 46	Ridgefield Park & Little Ferry	40°51′04″N 74°01′45″W	
	Interstate 80		I-80	Bogota & Hackensack	40°52′02″N 74°02′08″W	
16.3	Court Street Bridge (Harold J. Dillard Memorial Bridge)		Court Street - West Fort Lee Road	Bogota & Hackensack	40°52′44″N 74°02′22″W	
16.2	New York, Susquehanna and Western Railway		NYS&W	Bogota & Hackensack	40°52′52″N 74°02′15″W	
	Midtown Bridge aka Salem Street Bridge (Ryan Memorial Bridge)		CR 56; West Main Street originally carried PS and predecessor streetcars lines	Bogota & Hackensack	40°52′57″N 74°02′10″W	
	Anderson Street Bridge aka Cedar Lane Bridge		East Anderson Street - Cedar Lane	Teaneck & Hackensack	40°53′31″N 74°02′11″W	
	Fairleigh Dickinson University Footbridge			Teaneck & Hackensack	40°53′56″N 74°01′54″W	
	Route 4		Route 4	Teaneck & Hackensack	40°54′09″N 74°01′48″W	
	Swing Bridge at New Bridge Landing; Built 1889. to replace earlier 1744 sliding drawbridge.		Main Street (no cars)	New Bridge Landing; River Edge, Teaneck, New Milford	40°54′46″N 74°01′56″W	
	New Bridge Road			New Milford & River Edge	40°54′54″N 74°01′50″W	
	River Edge Avenue Bridge			New Milford & River Edge	40°56′06″N 74°01′43″W	
	New Milford Avenue Bridge (Merschrod Memorial Bridge)			New Milford	40°56′46″N 74°01′35″W	
	Elm Street Bridge part of the New Milford Plant of the Hackensack Water Company		Phoenix column Pratt pony truss	New Milford & Oradell	40°56′49″N 74°1′30″W	
	Oradell Avenue Bridge			Oradell	40°57′14″N 74°01′44″W	
	Oradell Reservoir Dam			Oradell	40°57′22″N 74°01′44″W	
	Old Hook Road Bridge		CR 502	Emerson, Harrington Park & Closter	40°58′37″N 73°59′03″W	
	Harriot Avenue Bridge			River Vale & Harrington Park	40°59′06″N 73°59′30″W	
	Westwood Avenue Bridge			River Vale & Old Tappan; New Jersey	40°59′57″N 73°59′21″W	
	Old Tappan Road			River Vale & Old Tappan; New Jersey	41°00′44″N 74°00′31″W	
	Lake Tappan Dam		footbridge	River Vale & Old Tappan; New Jersey	41°01′06″N 74°00′04″W	
	Poplar Road – Washington Avenue			River Vale & Old Tappan; New Jersey	41°01′07″N 73°59′59″W	
	Veterans Memorial Drive		CR 20	New York State; Pearl River	41°02′39″N 73°59′17″W	
	Convent Road		CR 26	Pearl River & Blauvelt	41°03′16″N 73°58′56″W	
	Blauvelt Road			Pearl River & Blauvelt	41°03′38″N 73°59′09″W	
	Palisades Interstate Parkway		Palisades Parkway	Pearl River & Blauvelt	41°03′57″N 73°58′44″W	
	Fifth Avenue			Pearl River & Blauvelt	41°04′13″N 73°58′32″W	
	Former Erie Railroad Bridge			Pearl River & Blauvelt		
	Western Highway		CR 15	West Nyack	41°05′10″N 73°57′47″W	
	River Subdivision (CSX)		West Shore Railroad (NYC); River Line (Conrail)	West Nyack	41°05′12″N 73°57′44″W	
	New York State Route 59		NY 59	West Nyack	41°05′40″N 73°57′40″W	
	New York Thruway		I-87 / I-287 / New York Thruway	West Nyack & Bardonia	41°06′03″N 73°57′56″W	
	Old Mill Road			Bardonia	41°06′20″N 73°58′00″W	
	Lake DeForest Dam			Bardonia	41°06′22″N 73°58′01″W	
	Congers Road Causeway		CR 80 across Lake DeForest	New City & Congers	41°09′21″N 73°57′30″W	
	Ridge Road		CR 23	New City	41°09′36″N 73°57′53″W	
	New York State Route 304		NY 304	New City	41°09′48″N 73°58′05″W	
	Haverstraw Road		Old Route 304	New City	41°10′17″N 73°58′11″W	

== Abbreviations ==
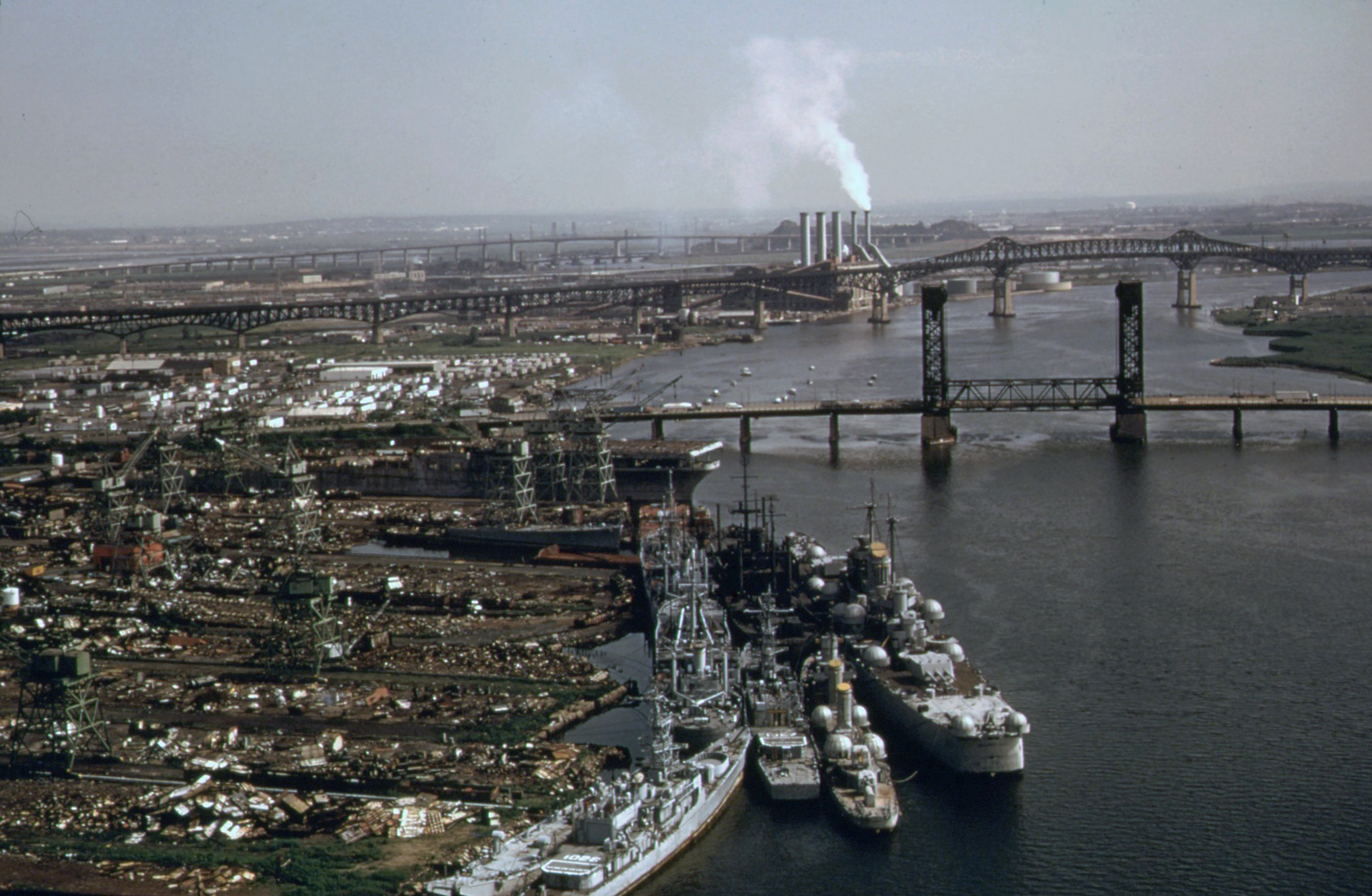
1974 view of Lincoln Highway and Pulaski Skyway

- CNJ=Central Railroad of New Jersey
- CR=County Road, County Route
- CSXT=CSX Transportation
- DL&W=Delaware, Lackawanna and Western Railroad
- Erie=Erie Railroad
- H&M=Hudson and Manhattan Railroad
- MNCR=Metro-North Railroad
- MP=mile point
- NYC=New York Central Railroad
- NJDOT=New Jersey Department of Transportation
- NJT=New Jersey Transit
- NYS&W=New York, Susquehanna and Western Railway
- NS=Norfolk Southern Railway
- PATH=Port Authority Trans-Hudson
- PRR=Pennsylvania Railroad
- PS=Public Service Railway
- USGS=United States Geological Survey

== See also ==
- New Milford Plant of the Hackensack Water Company
- Overpeck Creek
- Hackensack River Greenway
- Geography of New York–New Jersey Harbor Estuary
- Timeline of Jersey City, New Jersey-area railroads
- List of bridges, tunnels, and cuts in Hudson County, New Jersey
- List of crossings of the Lower Passaic River
- List of crossings of the Upper Passaic River
- List of NJ Transit moveable bridges
- List of fixed crossings of the North River (Hudson River)

== Sources ==
- Olsen, Kevin K. (2008), A Great Conveniency: A Maritime History of the Passaic River, Hackensack River, and Newark Bay, American History Imprints, ISBN 9780975366776
- Richman, Steven M. (2005), The Bridges of New Jersey, Rutgers University Press, p. 135, ISBN 0813535107
- "Bridgesnyc".
- "Drawbridge Schedules". NJDOT. April 12, 2012.
- jag9889 (July 3, 2007). "Hackensack River Bridges". Flickr.
- "Historic Bridge Survey (1991-1994)". NJDOT. 2001.
- "Masonry and Metal: The Historic Bridges of Bergen County, New Jersey" (PDF). Richard Grubb and Associates. 2008. Archived from the original (PDF) on July 10, 2012. "This publication lists the wrong date for the swing bridge at New Bridge Landing. Correct date built is February 4, 1889."
- "National Bridge Inventory Database". Archived from the original on February 2, 2019.
- Report of the Assembly Committee Appointed to Inquire into the Condition of the Bridges over the Passaic and Hackensack Rivers in the Counties of Union, Essex, Hudson (Report). Trenton: New Jersey Assembly. 1865.
- "117.723 Hackensack River", Title 33: Navigation and Navigable Waters Part 117—Drawbridge Operations Regulations, US Government Printing Office, October 20, 2012, archived from the original on December 27, 2014
