= New Milford Plant of the Hackensack Water Company =

- U.S. National Register of Historic Places
- New Jersey Register of Historic Places
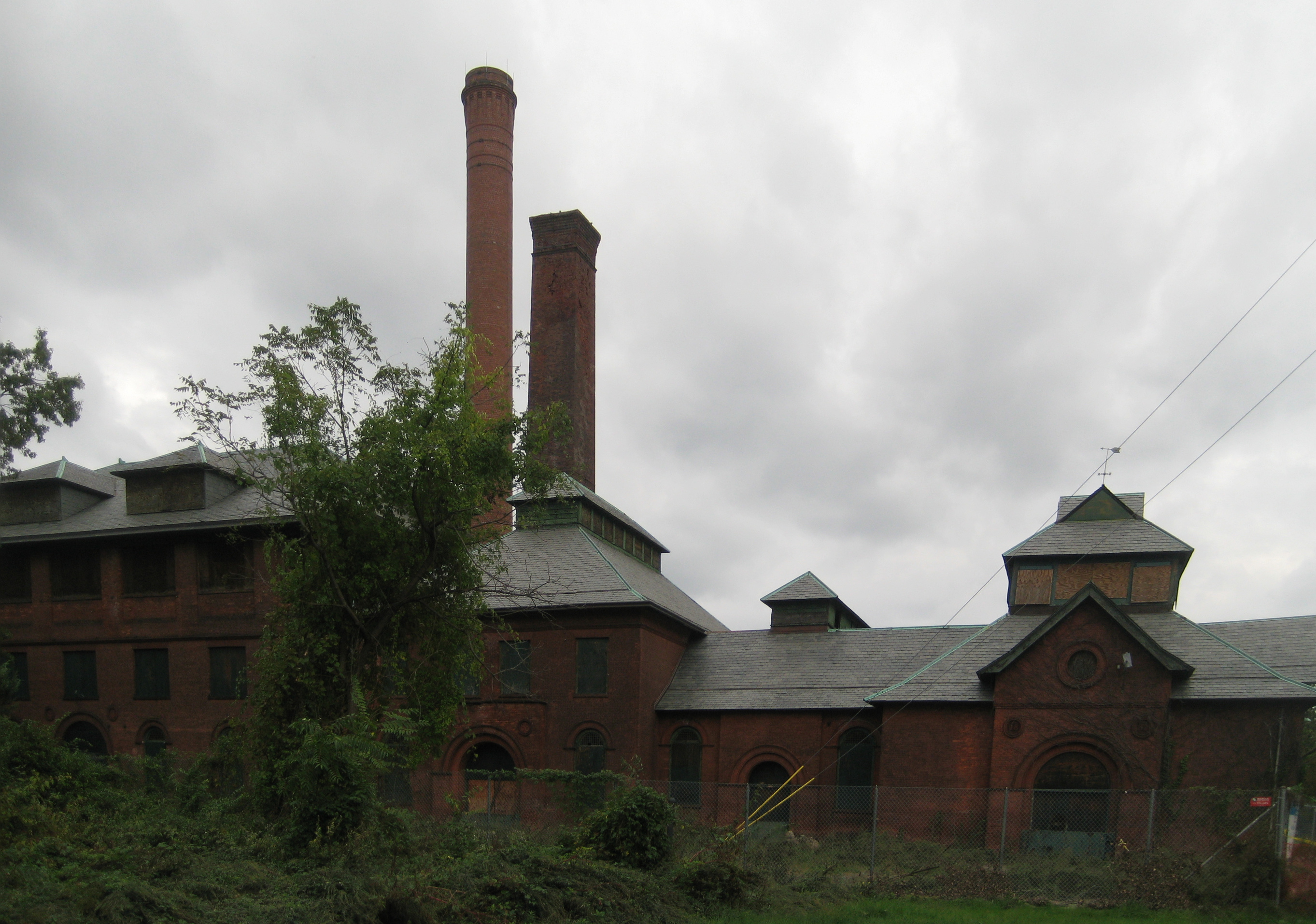

- Location within Bergen County, New Jersey Location within New Jersey Location within the United States
- Location: New Milford Avenue, Oradell, New Jersey
- Coordinates: 40°56′49″N 74°1′30″W
- Area: 13.3 acres (5.4 ha)
- Built: 1882
- Architects: Brush, Charles Benjamin; Tierney, Myles
- Architectural style: Late Victorian, Romanesque
- NRHP reference No.: 01000891
- NJRHP No.: 1922

Significant dates
- Added to NRHP: August 22, 2001
- Designated NJRHP: June 21, 2001

The New Milford Plant of the Hackensack Water Company was a water treatment and pumping plant located on Van Buskirk Island, an artificially created island in the Hackensack River, in Oradell, Bergen County, New Jersey, United States. The site was purchased in 1881 by the Hackensack Water Company, which developed it for water supply use. The facility was built between 1881 and 1911, and it includes a brick pumping station from 1882, a tall filtration tower, and huge underground infrastructure. The Hackensack Water Company was merged into United Water in the 1980s; the successor today is Suez North America.

== Van Buskirk Island ==
Van Buskirk Island is a man-made island formed in 1802, and was created by the dams for the mills, The Southern End was known as the old Dock, Upper Landing or Old Landing and was the official head of navigation on the Hackensack River (the highest point of navigable water on the river). Schooners plied the river regularly between Old Dock and New York City. The land was also an industrial center from Pre-Revolutionary War times with several types of mills: saw mills, bark mills, a woolen mill, and finally a gristmill. After this it was used as the site for the Hackensack Water Company from 1882. The site remains historically intact from 1911, including important steam equipment from the Industrial Revolution.

== Preservation ==
In 1990, United Water (formerly Hackensack Water Company) ceased using the site and offered it to Oradell, then Bergen County. The island is currently in a state of transition and the focus of a battle between the county and conservation groups regarding its future status and use as a park and/or recreational area. Preservation New Jersey voted the plant "One of 10 Most Endangered Historic Sites" in 1996. In 2002, the National Trust for Historic Preservation placed Hackensack Water Company site on its list of 11 Most Endangered National Historic Places. In May 2001, the site was listed on New Jersey Register of Historic Places - Period of Historic Importance 1882-1914. The site is currently in a state of disrepair, and although proposals have been made by Bergen County for what to do with the site, its future is uncertain. Bergen County Division of Historic and Cultural Affairs is attempting to build public support for redeveloping the site. In August 2011, the state awarded $704,000 to be administered by the New Jersey Historic Trust for the stabilization of buildings at the complex so that the site could be opened to the general public.

== See also ==
- Hackensack Water Company Complex
- Oradell Reservoir
- List of crossings of the Hackensack River
- National Register of Historic Places listings in Bergen County, New Jersey
