= Merrill Creek Reservoir =

Lake in New Jersey, United States

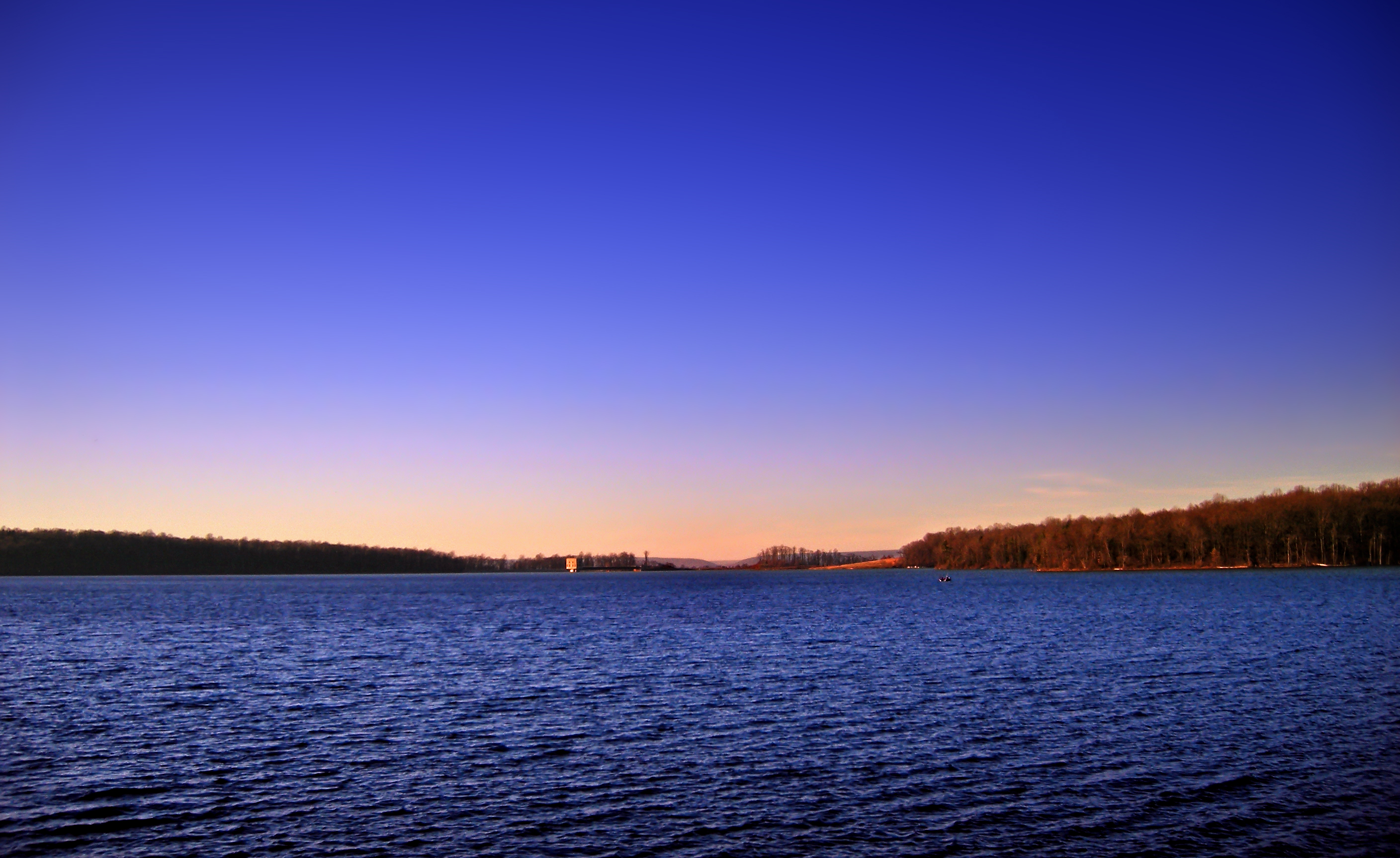

- Location within New Jersey Location within the United States
- Location: Harmony Township, Warren County, New Jersey
- Coordinates: 40°44′10″N 75°6′5″W
- Lake type: reservoir
- Basin countries: United States
- Surface area: 650 acres (260 ha)
- Max. depth: 225 ft (69 m)

Merrill Creek Reservoir, located in Harmony Township, New Jersey in central Warren County, New Jersey, is a 650-acre (260 ha) artificial lake designed to hold 15 billion gallons of water that is surrounded by 290 acres (120 ha) of protected woodland and fields. These lands are themselves part of 2,000 acres (8.1 km^{2}) of open spaces.

Merrill Creek is connected to the Delaware River, about 3 miles (4.8 km) via a tunnel. The earthen Merrill Creek Dam (National ID # NJ00864), with a height of 280 feet (85 m) and a length at its crest of 1,140 feet (350 m), was built in 1988 by a consortium of seven electric utilities, under the mandate of the Delaware River Basin Commission. It replaces the river water lost through evaporation in the cooling of 14 power plants. The owners, known as the Merrill Creek Owners Group, are Public Service Electric and Gas, which built the reservoir for the group; Jersey Central Power and Light, Atlantic City Electric, Metropolitan Edison, Philadelphia Electric, PPL Corporation, and Delmarva Power and Light.

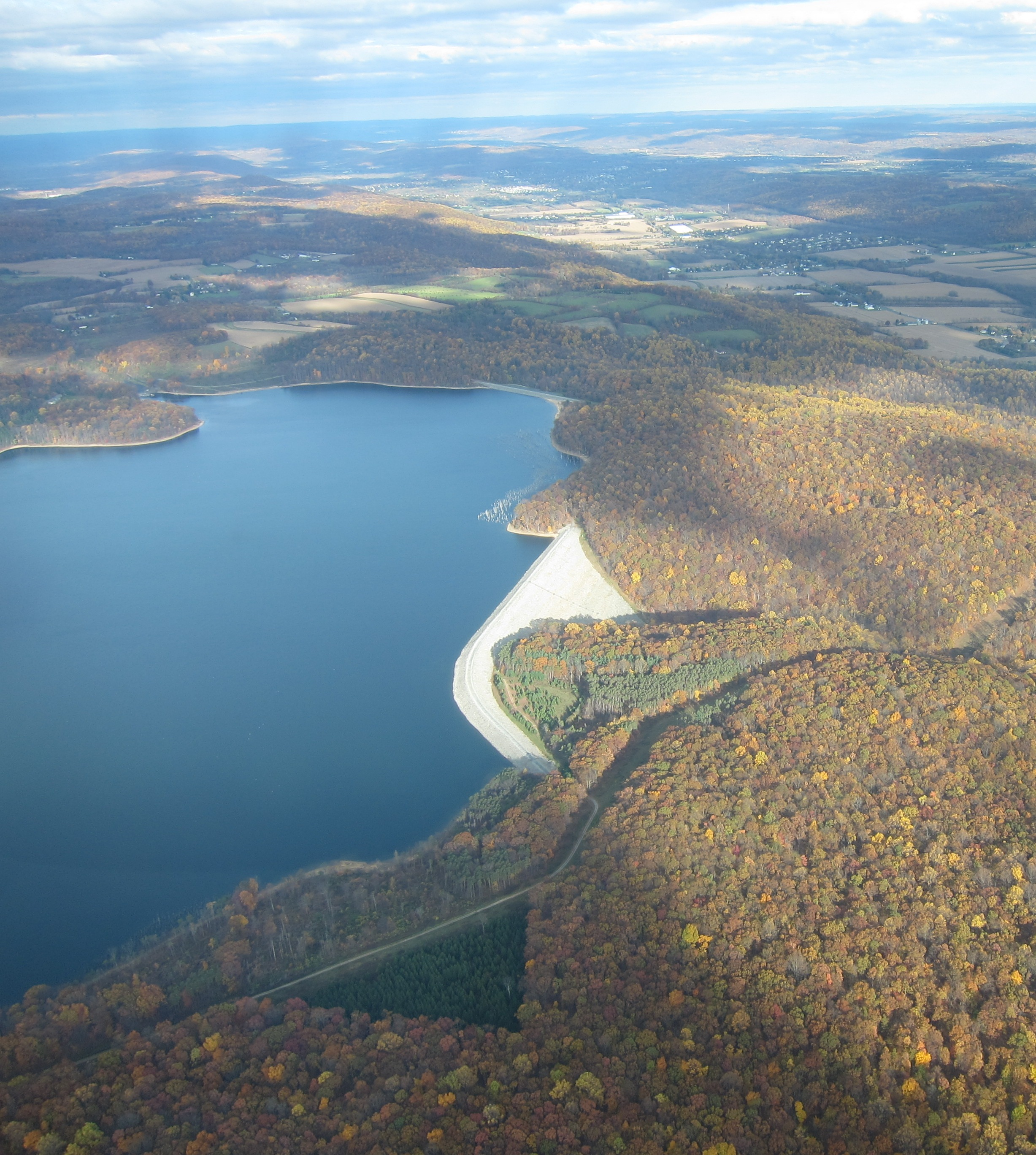
Merrill Creek Dam and Reservoir from the air.

The reservoir draws water from the Delaware in springtime, when river flow normally is abundant, and restores it in the summer, when the flow is usually meager and – compounding the problem – demand for electricity for air-conditioning is high. In addition, by maintaining an ample Delaware River flow, seawater intrusion into the aquifers that provide drinking water to many South Jersey communities, including Camden, is minimized. Construction cost $217 million and was one of the largest construction projects in the United States in the 1986-87 construction period. The entire site was cleared of dense forest by huge tree-eating machines, and construction crews worked two 12-hour shifts to build a large earth dam and two dikes.

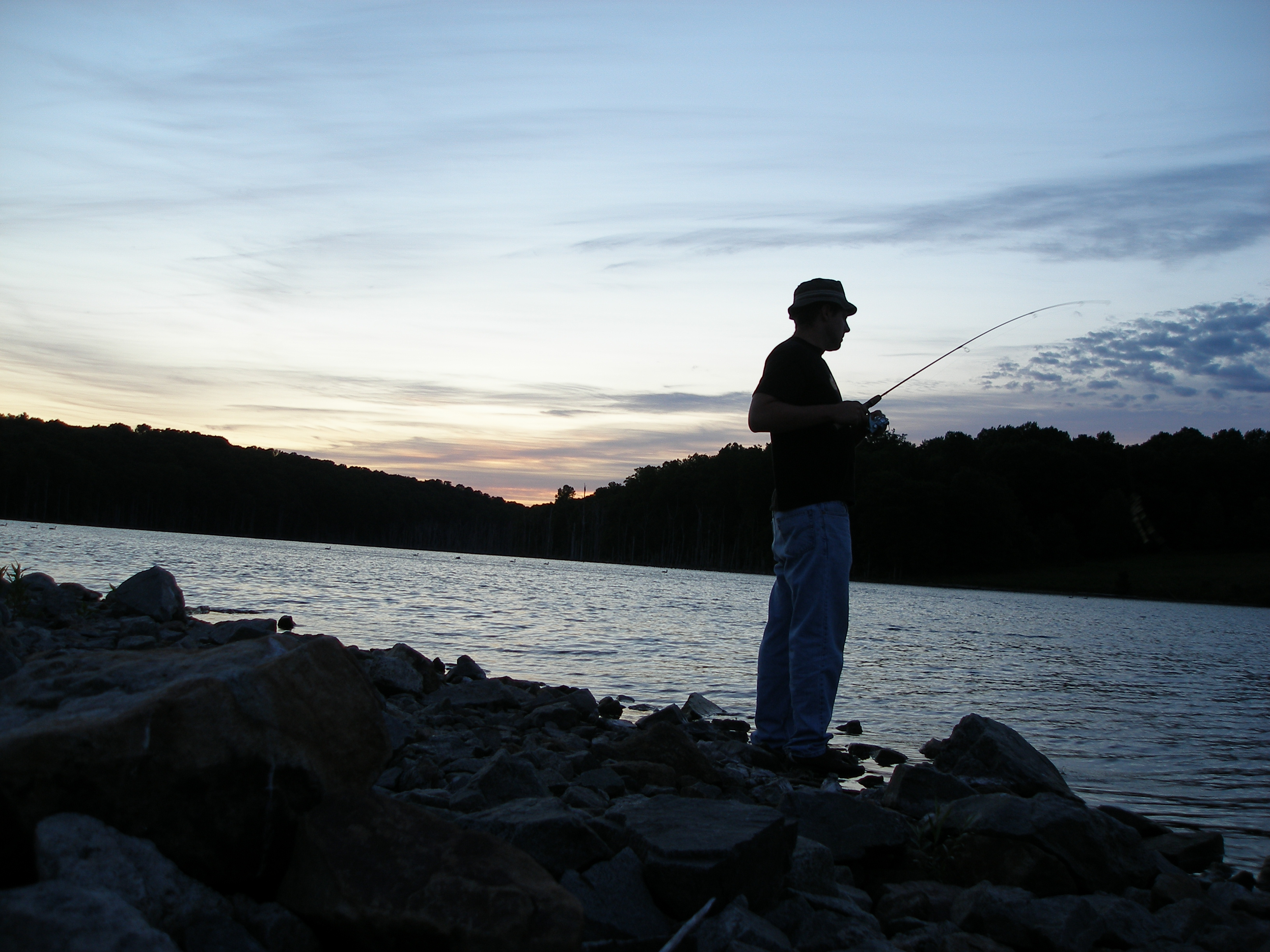
Fishing at Merrill Creek Reservoir

Launching facilities are provided for recreational boating, but no gasoline motors are allowed. The reservoir and surrounding parkland offer visitors an opportunity to engage in outdoor activity. Some of the abundant wildlife around the lake includes bald eagles, crows, white-tailed deer, wild turkey, and other various migratory birds. The reservoir is best known for its brown trout fishing. Other fish in the reservoir include walleye, yellow perch, small and largemouth bass, chain pickerel, crappie, catfish, sunfish, carp, rainbow trout, brook trout, lake trout and landlocked Atlantic salmon.

The lake is about 225 feet (69 m) deep, making it the deepest man-made lake in New Jersey. The depth allows for lake trout to exist and other trout to exist year round. Merrill Creek Reservoir is one of two lakes in New Jersey where lake trout exist; the other is Round Valley Reservoir in Hunterdon County, New Jersey. Since 2018, the lake has been stocked with landlocked Atlantic salmon.

The lake's visitor center features natural history and cultural exhibits and offers environmental education programs for all age groups ranging from pre-K through adults.
