= Hackensack Water Company Complex =

- U.S. National Register of Historic Places
- New Jersey Register of Historic Places
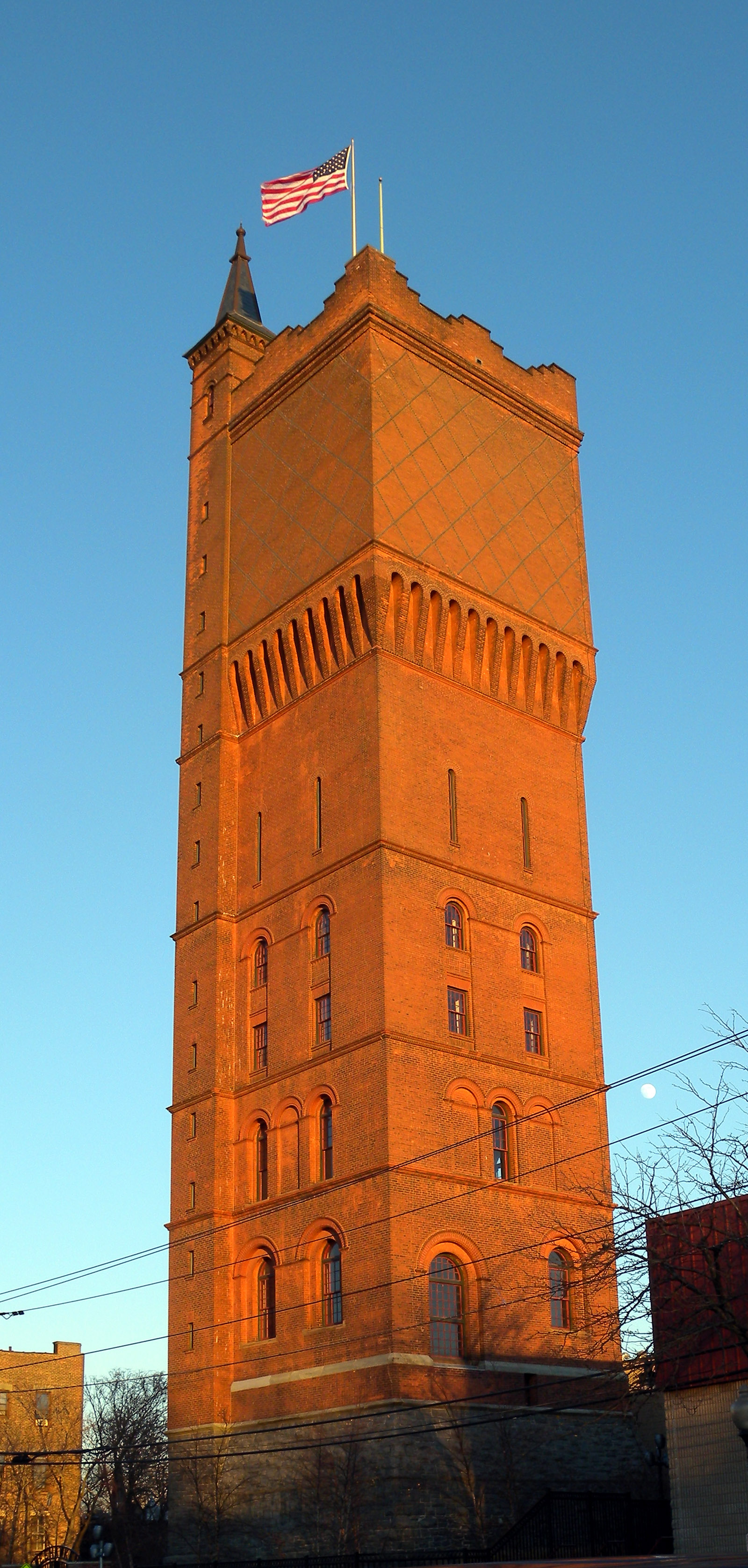
- Red tower

- Location within Hudson County, New Jersey
- Location: 4100 Park Avenue, Weehawken, New Jersey
- Coordinates: 40°46′24″N 74°1′13″W
- Area: 7.7 acres (3.1 ha)
- Built: 1883
- Architect: Withers, Frederick C.
- NRHP reference No.: 80002491
- NJRHP No.: 1510

Significant dates
- Added to NRHP: January 3, 1980
- Designated NJRHP: August 24, 1979

The Hackensack Water Company Complex is a set of historic buildings in Weehawken, New Jersey, registered in the U.S. National Register of Historic Places. The Hackensack Water Company, a predecessor of Suez North America, developed water supply and storage in northeastern New Jersey from the 1870s to the 1970s, initially to provide service to the city of Hackensack and the towns of North Hudson. Originally its headquarters and major facilities were located at Hackensack, in Bergen County. Under Robert W. de Forest, who ran the Hackensack Water Company for 46 years beginning in 1881, the company constructed new facilities and moved its headquarters to Weehawken in Hudson County, setting up offices in a brick water tower, part of the present complex.

== Weehawken Water Tower ==
The headquarters' most distinguishing feature, the red brick Weehawken Water Tower, was built in 1883 on what is now Park Avenue, on the border of Union City. Designed by Frederick Clarke Withers, it was modeled after the Palazzo Vecchio in Florence, Italy. The tower stands 175 feet high, 300 feet above sea level at the Hudson River.

The tower was connected to Reservoir No.1 atop the Hudson Palisades to which water was pumped from the Hackensack River, about 14 miles away. While the reservoir at the site could provide adequate pressure for water users in Hoboken, located just above sea level, water pressure was inadequate for customers atop the Palisades.

The tower was designed to accomplish two purposes. First, it housed the local headquarters of the Hackensack Water Company; second, it held up to 165,000 gallons of potable water in its tank, stored under pressure for use by residents, businesses, and for fighting fires. Its opening on September 29, 1883 was a major event, professional journals recognized Withers for the innovation of his design. The "Red Tower" is listed on the Federal Maritime Chart as a landmark for ships heading south on the Hudson River to let them know that they are approaching New York Harbor.

The site was added to the National Register of Historic Places in 1980, which spared it from demolition, after which it was structurally maintained. Entin Associates, a real-estate developer, purchased the complex in 1981 for $1.6 million. The gatehouse and reservoir were razed for the construction of a supermarket and parking. The tower was spared demolition and structurally maintained.

The township of Weehawken took over the property in 2000, and began a restoration project for Water Tower Park. Paragon Restoration Corporation completed eight months of restoration on the site's exteriors in September 2004, with slate replaced on the roof, stonework fixed at the base and windows replaced. New steel supports and wood floors were installed in the interior, and space was left to accommodate an elevator and fire staircase. In October 2005, a plaza park was created at the base of the tower. The interior of the tower was restored in the late 2000s. In 2010, as part of the town's 150th anniversary, interior brickwork was cleaned while maintaining its historical appearance. In 2014, Mayor Richard Turner opened up the Water Tower for the annual three-week-long PlayWorks reading series, in which playwrights present readings of their unfinished plays, which celebrated the first time the restored tower had been used in over 100 years.

In September 2014, Justin Casquejo, a thrill-seeking teenage free solo climber and stunt performer hung from the tower, and was charged with defiant trespassing and resisting arrest.

== Hackensack Reservoir No. 2-Reservoir Park ==
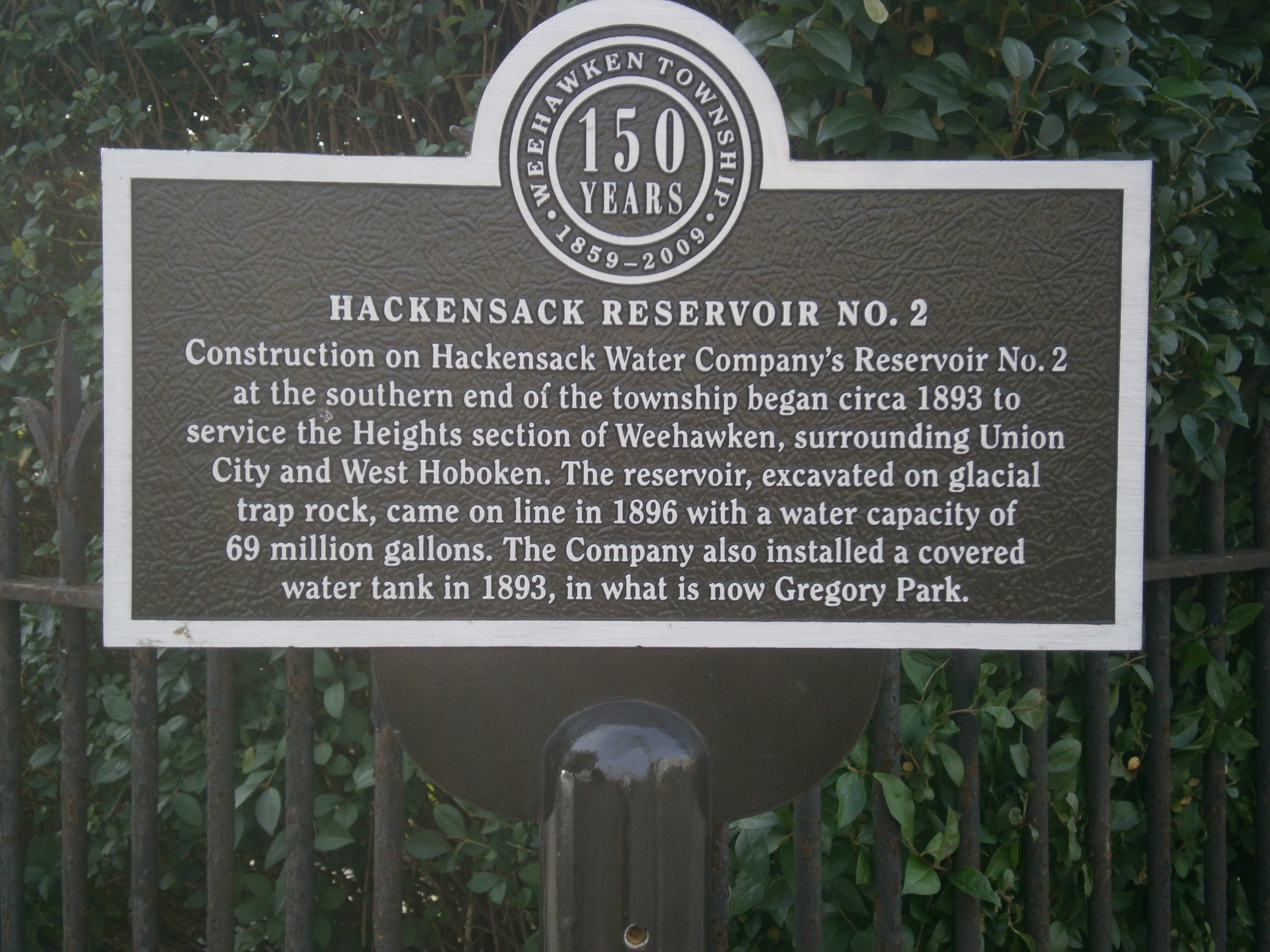
Historical marker at Palisade and Highpoint

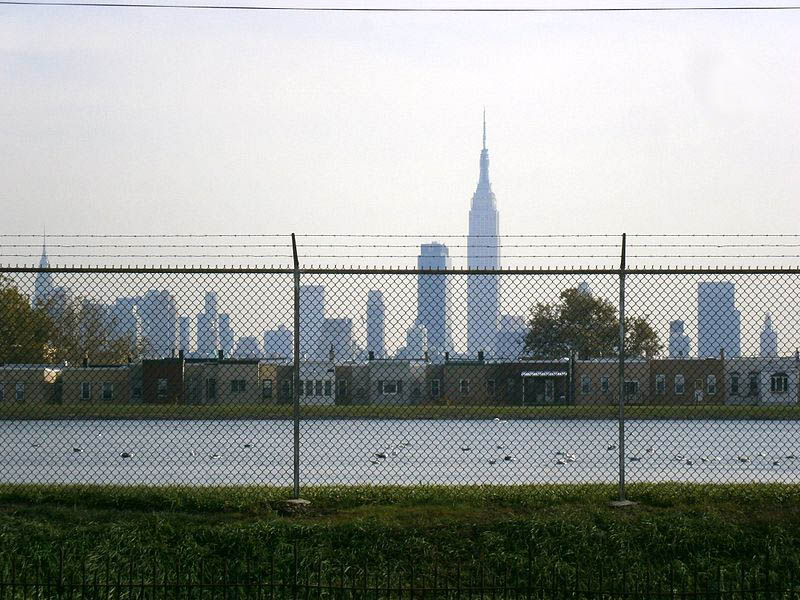
View from Palisade Avenue

Hackensack Reservoir No. 2 was another component of the water company's system in the township, later owned by its successor, United Water. The site, slightly more than 14 acres and the largest piece of undeveloped property in North Hudson, is located in Weehawken Heights and is bounded by Highpoint Avenue, Gregory Avenue, 20th Street, and Palisade Avenue, the latter two of which create the border with neighboring Union City. It was built during a period of extensive urbanization of the area in the late 19th century.

The historical marker reads:

Construction of the Hackensack Water Company's Reservoir No. 2 at the southern end of the township began circa 1893 to serve the Heights section of Weehawken, surrounding Union City and West Hoboken. The reservoir, excavated on glacial trap rock, came on line in 1896 with capacity of 69 million gallons. The company also installed a covered water tank in 1893 in what is now Gregory Park.

United Water announced that it wanted to divest most of the property in early 2011 at an unofficial price of $11.5 million. The company will retain 4.2 acres to build an underground water storage tank to improve water pressure, estimated to cost $25 to $30 million. The Trust for Public Land, which appraised the site, arranged to postpone the sale of the reservoir until the end of the year.

In 2010 the township began a process to purchase the grounds. The New Jersey Department of Environmental Protection gave the township a $2 million grant in Green Acres funding. A $9 million low interest loan from the department's infrastructure trust program was made with the intention that in the future, as funding permits, additional grants for re-payment would be made. No interest has to be paid on three-quarters of the money and minimal interest on the other one-quarter. The township introduced a bond for $9.2 million. Weehawken and Union City are initially investing $300,000 to transform the grounds into passive recreational space. They will share the annual upkeep of the property. The completed sale was announced in December 2011. The park opened in 2015.

== Jersey City Reservoir No. 3 ==
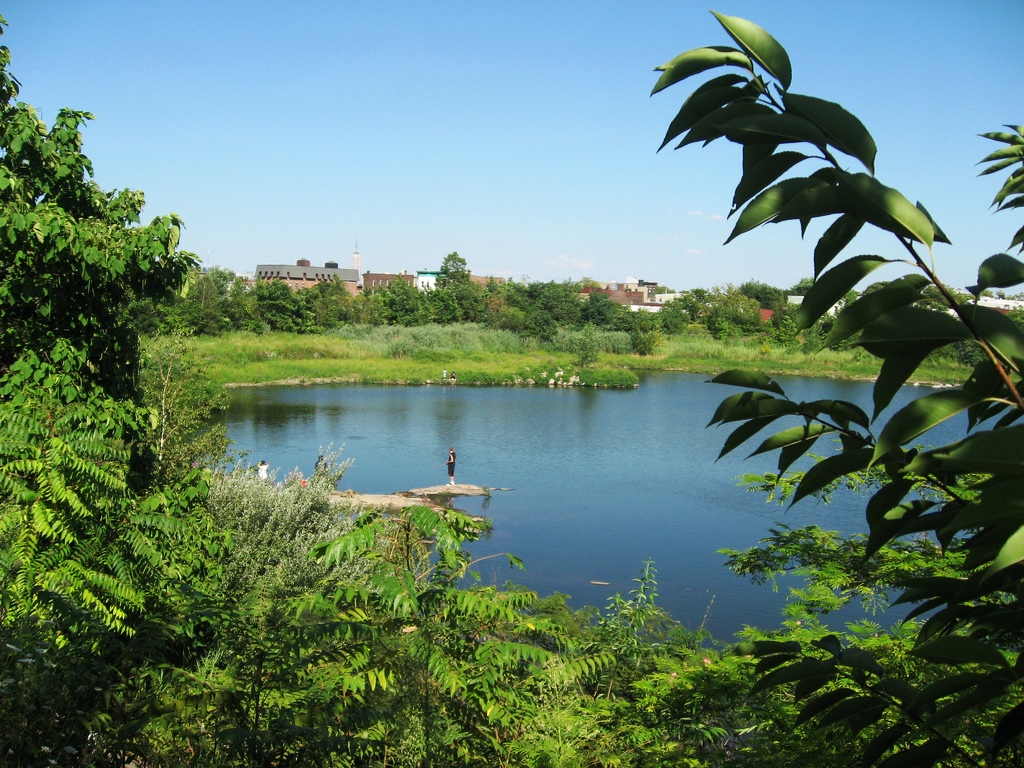
Reservoir #3 adjacent to Pershing Field

While not originally part of the Hackensack Water Company infrastructure, another reservoir atop the Hudson Palisades is Jersey City Reservoir No. 3, which also developed at the end of the 19th century in Jersey City Heights, Jersey City. Tt was closed to the public in the 1970s, and its usage as a municipal water source ended in 1992. Since 2007 it has preserved the open reservoir for the public use as a wild life management area adjacent to Pershing Field. Nearby Reservoir #1 was located on either side of Summit Avenue, and has since been demolished.

== See also ==
- New Milford Plant of the Hackensack Water Company
- Pershing Field
- National Register of Historic Places listings in Hudson County, New Jersey
- Union Watersphere
