= Point View Dam =

Dam in Wayne, New Jersey, U.S.

Coordinates: 40°58′20″N 74°15′20″W

Point View Dam (National ID # NJ00236) is a dam in Wayne, Passaic County, New Jersey.

The earthen gravity dam was constructed in 1964 to impound the water of Haycock Brook for municipal drinking water. It is 55 feet (17 m) high with a length of 1,100 feet (340 m) at its crest. Both dam and reservoir are owned and operated by the Passaic Valley Water Commission, and stands as the largest of the Commission's four reservoirs. In 2009 it was slated for a state-funded restoration costing several million dollars.

The reservoir it creates, Point View Reservoir, has a water surface area of 465 acres (188 ha), a maximum capacity of 10,450 acre-feet (12,890,000 m^{3}), and a normal capacity of 8,590 acre-feet (10,600,000 m^{3}). Fishing requires a permit from the Passaic Valley Water Commission.
