= Shadow Lake Dam =

Coordinates: 40.3530°N 74.0852°W

Shadow Lake Dam is a dam on Nut Swamp Brook in Monmouth County, New Jersey. Built in 1931, it has a length of 600 feet (180 m) and is 16 feet (4.9 m) high. The dam impounds Shadow Lake. It has a main overflow spillway, an earthfill berm and an emergency spillway on the right. It has a discharge capacity of 1,912 cubic feet per second. Hubbard Road (County Route 12) crosses over its crest.
