= High Tor State Park =

State park in Rockland County, New York, United States

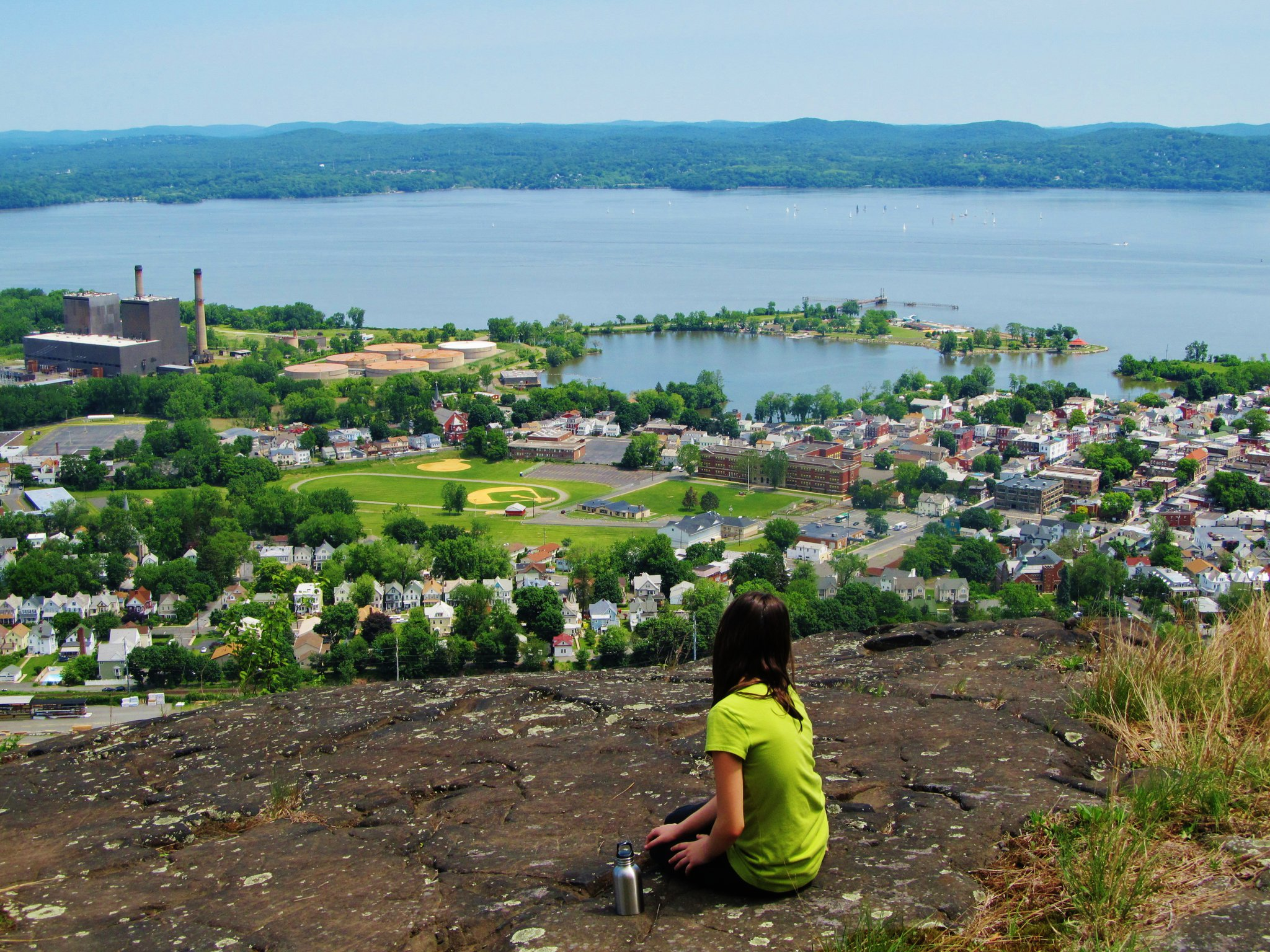
- View from atop High Tor Mountain with the Village of Haverstraw, the Hudson River, and Westchester County in the distance.

- Location within New York Location within the United States
- Type: State park
- Location: 415 South Mountain Road; New City, New York
- Nearest city: Haverstraw, New York
- Coordinates: 41°11′16″N 73°59′20″W
- Area: 691 acres (2.80 km^{2})
- Created: 1943
- Operator: Palisades Interstate Park Commission; New York State Office of Parks, Recreation and Historic Preservation
- Visitors: 21,524 (in 2014)
- Website: High Tor State Park

High Tor State Park is a 691-acre (2.80 km^{2}) state park on the north edge of the Town of Clarkstown in Rockland County, New York, United States. The park is located on South Mountain, which has two peaks, High Tor and Little Tor. Its highest peak, High Tor, is 797 feet (243 m) high.

== Park description ==
High Tor State Park is intended for day use during the summer months, and contains picnic tables, a pool and showers, hiking trails, and a food concession. The Long Path passes through the park.

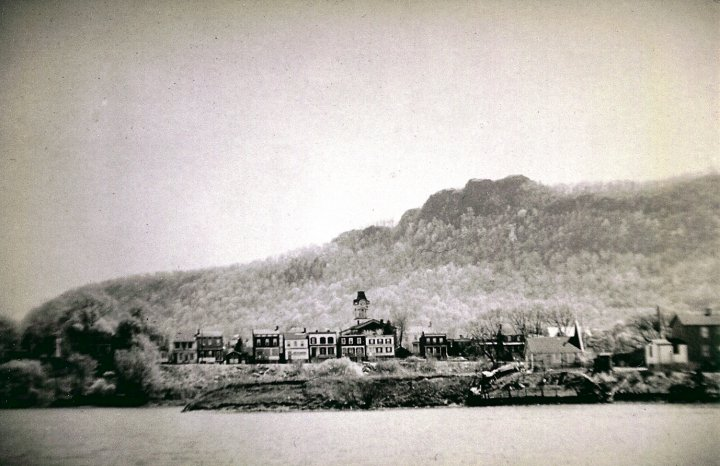
An early photograph from across the Hudson River looking toward the Village of Haverstraw and the High Tor and Little Tor peaks.

The park contains two peaks: High Tor at 797 feet (243 m), and Little Tor at 620 feet (190 m). They are the highest peaks in not only the park, but in all of the Hudson Palisades. The skylines of New York City, Jersey City and Newark are visible to hikers on High Tor, as well as on Little Tor during the Fall and Winter months when there's less foliage.

High Tor was used as a signal point during the American Revolution for the colonists, and was used as an air raid watch during World War II. Famous composer Kurt Weill worked as an air raid warden there.

== See also ==
- High Tor, a 1936 play by Maxwell Anderson that focuses on the summit within the park
- List of New York state parks
