= Hackensack River =

River in the U.S. states of New York and New Jersey

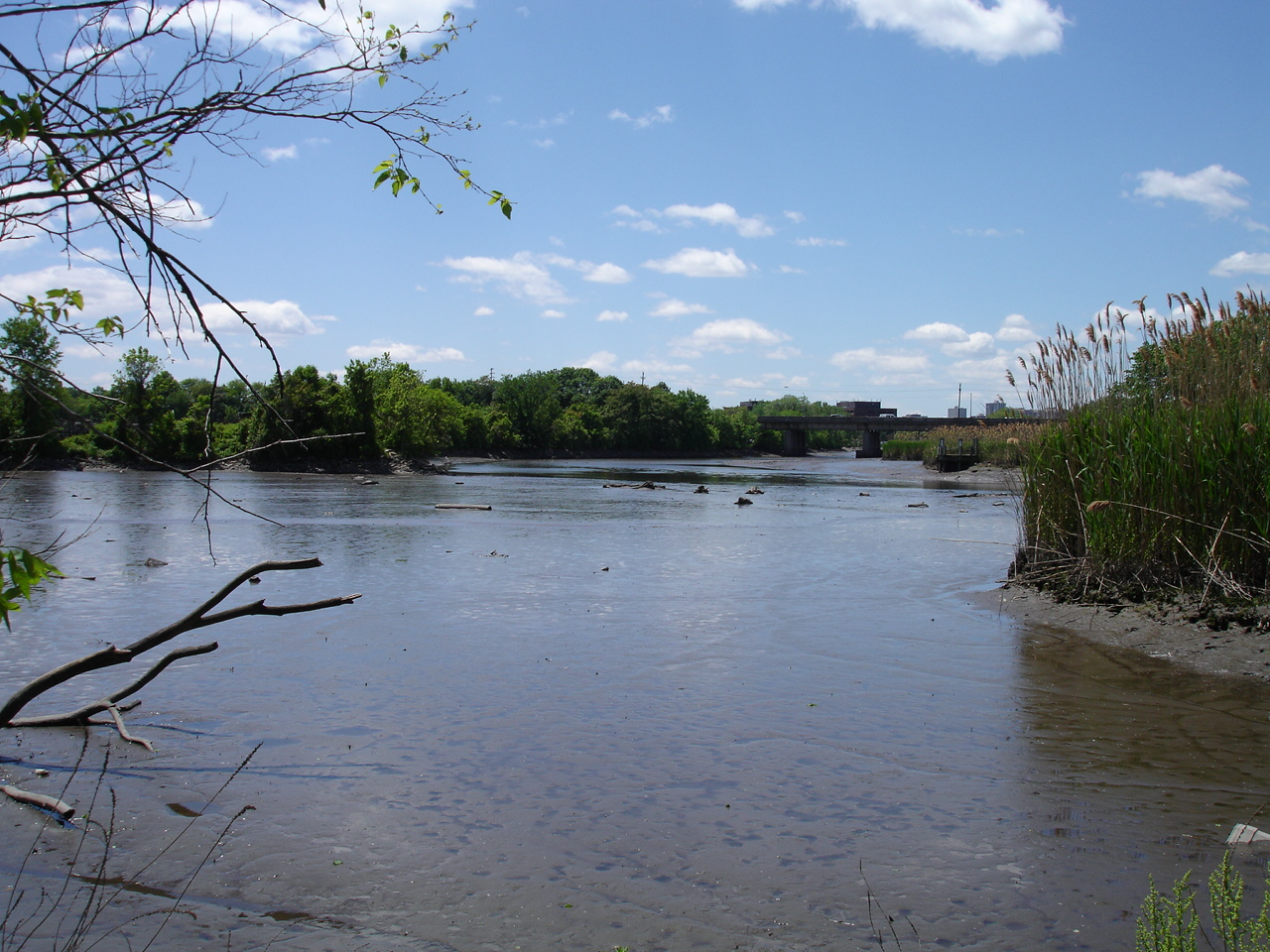

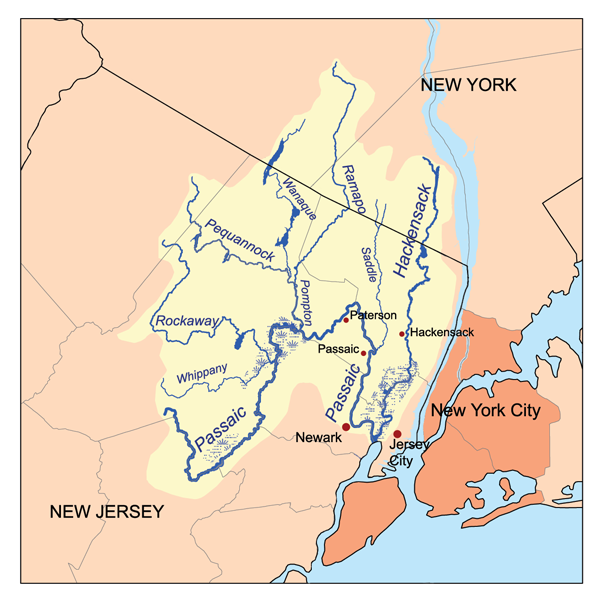
- The Passaic and Hackensack watersheds

Location
- Country: United States
- State: New Jersey, New York
- Counties: Hudson, NJ, Bergen, NJ, Rockland, NY
- City: Hackensack, NJ

Physical characteristics
- Source
  - location: New City, Rockland County, New York, United States
  - coordinates: 41°11′00″N 73°59′24″W
  - elevation: 120 ft (37 m)
- Mouth: Newark Bay
  - location: Hudson County, New Jersey, United States
  - coordinates: 40°42′55″N 74°06′42″W
  - elevation: 0 ft (0 m)
- Length: 54 mi (87 km)
- Discharge
  - location: New Milford, NJ
  - minimum: 0 cu ft/s (0 m^{3}/s)
  - maximum: 880 cu ft/s (25 m^{3}/s)

The Hackensack River is a river, about 45 miles (72 km) long, in the U.S. states of New York and New Jersey, emptying into Newark Bay, a back chamber of New York Harbor. The watershed of the river includes part of the suburban area outside New York City just west of the lower Hudson River, which it roughly parallels, separated from it by the New Jersey Palisades. It also flows through and drains the New Jersey Meadowlands. The lower river, which is navigable as far as the city of Hackensack, is heavily industrialized and forms a commercial extension of Newark Bay.

Once believed to be among the most polluted watercourses in the United States, it staged a modest revival by the late 2000s. The river is divided into the upper river, north of the Oradell Reservoir and Oradell Dam, and lower river, south of the reservoir and dam.

== Description ==
The Hackensack River rises in southeastern New York, in Rockland County, in the Sweet Swamp, located in the hamlet of New City just west of the Hudson River and half a mile south of High Tor State Park. It flows briefly southeast, into the Lake DeForest reservoir, separated from the Hudson by less than 3 mi (5 km). South of the dam, it then flows south, diverging from the Hudson. Just across the New Jersey state line, in northern Bergen County, it is impounded to form the reservoir Lake Tappan near River Vale.

South of Lake Tappan, it flows in a meandering course southward through the suburban communities of New Jersey. Near Oradell, it is impounded to form Oradell Reservoir, where it is surrounded primarily by Oradell, Haworth, and Emerson, and joined by several streams, including the Dwars Kill, the Cherry Brook, and Pascack Brook. Van Buskirk Island, a man-made island and site of the New Milford Plant of the Hackensack Water Company, lies in this area. South of the reservoir, it flows through the Oradell Dam through River Edge, Hackensack, Teaneck, Bogota, and Ridgefield Park, once again approaching within 3 mi (5 km) of the Hudson, and separated from it by the ridge of the Palisades.

At Little Ferry, it is joined by the broad Overpeck Creek, then flows southward, widening in a broad, meandering tidal estuary through the Meadowlands, forming extensive side streams and wetlands. South of North Bergen, it forms the boundary between Bergen County to the west and Hudson County to the east. Opposite Secaucus it is joined by Berry's Creek, then flows past the western edge of Jersey City, which overlooks the river's valley from the ridge of the Palisades, before forming Newark Bay at its confluence with the Passaic River between Jersey City and Kearny.

As it flows through the Meadowlands it is traversed by numerous rail and road bridges.

== History ==
The name of the Hackensack River comes from the Lenape word Achinigeu-hach, or Ackingsah-sack, meaning "flat confluence of streams" or "stony ground". Conflicts with the Lenape prevented the early Dutch settlers of the New Netherland colony from expanding westward into the valley into late in the 17th century. The river furnished both the Native Americans and the European settlers with abundant runs of herring, shad, and striped bass.

At the outset of the colonial era, the river's watershed was home to Lenape groups now known as the Rumachenanck (or Haverstraw), Tappan, and Hackensack, the latter exonym taken from an encampment near the confluence of the tributary Overpeck Creek. European settlement began in the mid-17th century as part of New Netherland, when the region was called Achter Kol, meaning "rear pass" or "behind the ridge", to describe the valleys west of the Hudson Palisades, which afforded passage to trapping grounds in the northern hinterlands.

The river and the surrounding meadowlands presented a formidable difficulty in transportation and communication. The wetlands helped allow the escape of the Continental Army under George Washington in 1776 after several defeats at the hands of the British army on the east side of the Hudson. It later served as a protective barrier that allowed Washington's army to encamp in the nearby hills near Morristown.

== Urbanization and pollution ==
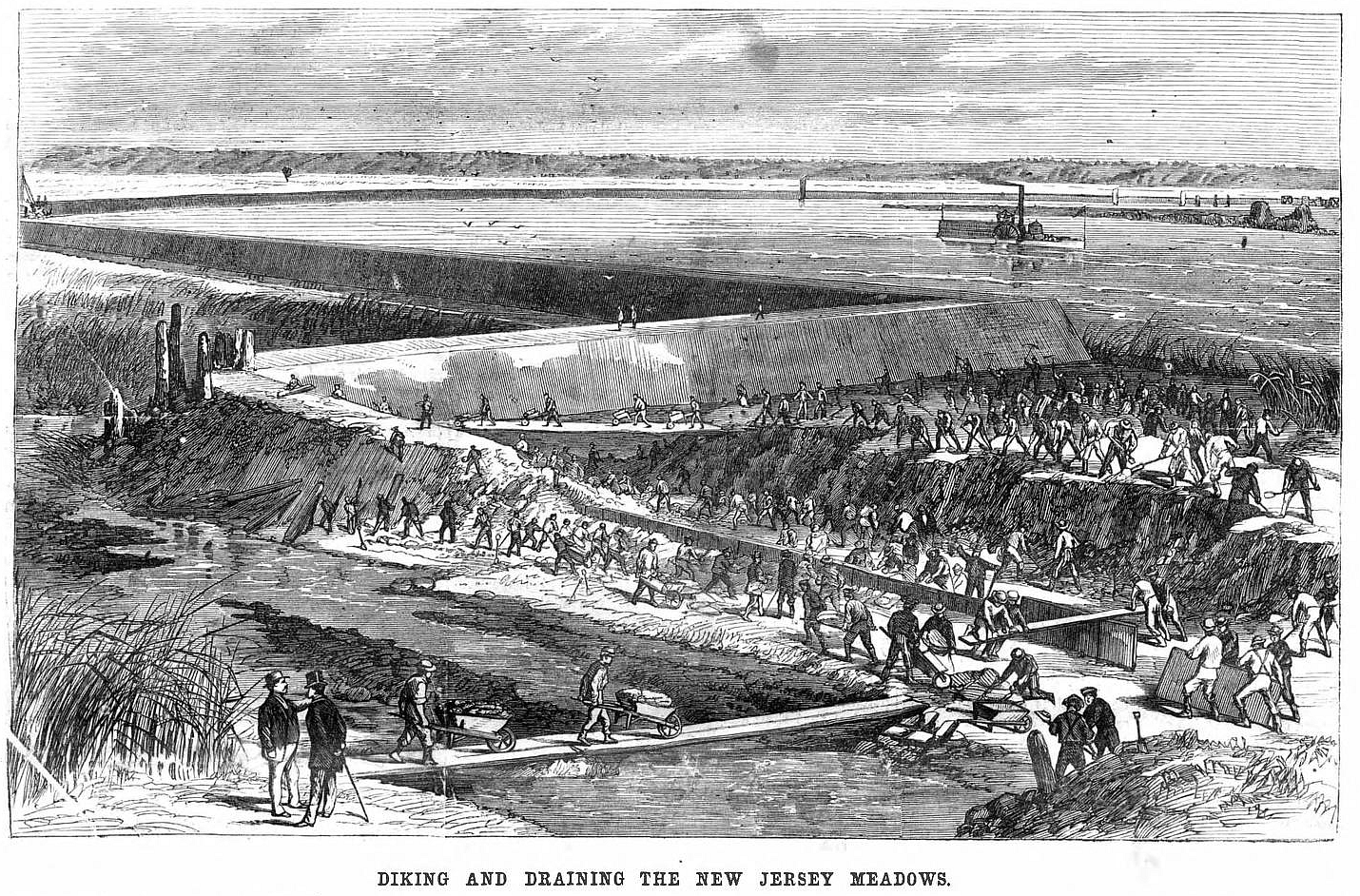
Filling wetlands in the mid-19th century

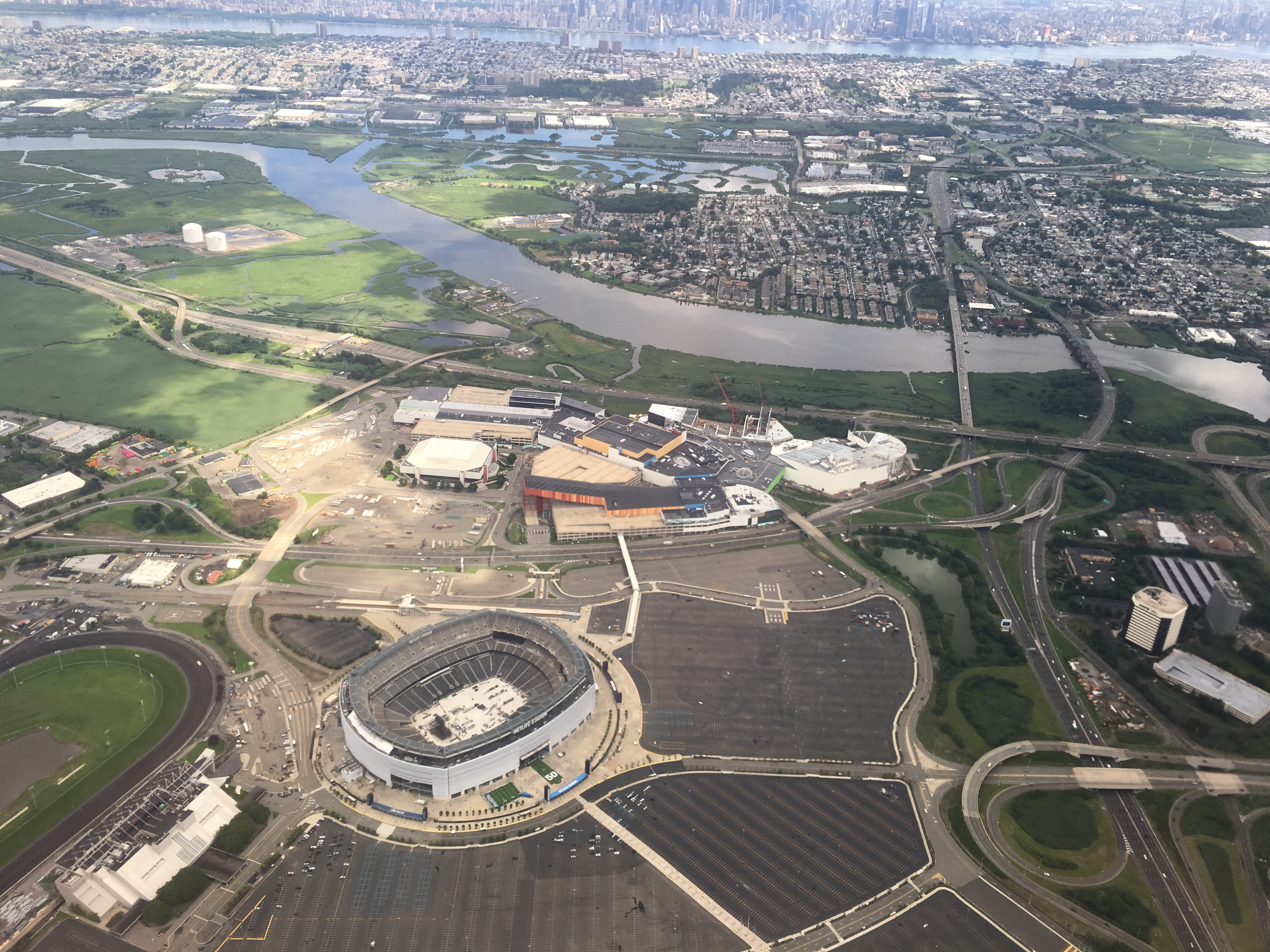
The Meadowlands Sports Complex was built near the Hackensack River in the 1970s. Seen in the distance are the Hudson River and New York City.

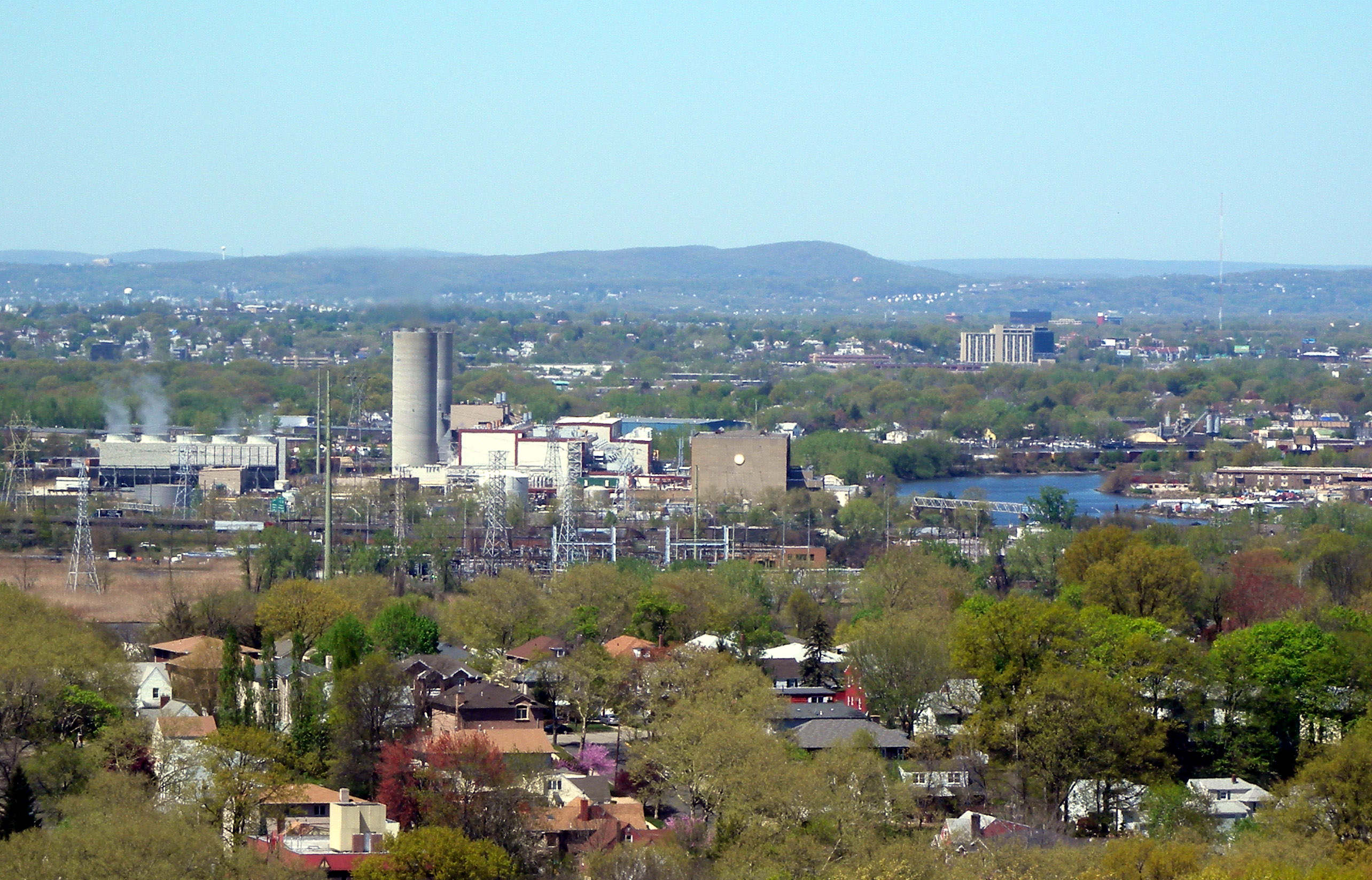
Bergen Generating Station on Overpeck Creek in Ridgefield

Human alterations to land in the Hackensack meadowlands increased in the 19th century, including clearing forests, building roads, railroads, and ditches, and filling wetlands. The Second Industrial Revolution led to construction of heavy manufacturing, storage tanks, and chemical-processing plants in the area during the late 19th and early 20th centuries.

The economic development and population increases in the watershed led to extensive water pollution in the river, both from municipal sewage and industrial wastewater. In the 20th century, untreated sewage discharges from the various towns and cities began to contribute significant amounts of pollutants to the river. The first sewage plant with secondary treatment technology (which removes at least 85% of pollutants) did not open until the 1950s, and more treatment capacity was added in the region in the following decades. Water quality studies in the late 1980s indicated that the river continued to be impaired with low oxygen levels and nutrient pollution. In the 21st century, many communities in the watershed continue to be drained by combined sewers, which discharge untreated sewage during large rainstorms.

Development of new drinking water supplies also had major environmental impacts on the river. The construction of the Oradell Reservoir dam in 1921 essentially changed the lower river from a free-flowing stream into a brackish estuary, allowing the encroachment of marine species. Urbanization in the region intensified after World War II, with the expansion of roads and highways, including the New Jersey Turnpike (1952), as well as the Meadowlands Sports Complex (1970s).

By the 1960s, much of the lower river was essentially a turbid, hypoxic dead zone, with only the hardiest of species, such as the mummichog, able to survive in its waters. Chemical companies dumped large volumes of waste into Berry's Creek during the 20th century, resulting in the highest concentrations of methyl mercury of any freshwater sediment in the world, as well as extensive residues of polychlorinated biphenyls and other chemicals. Three sites along the creek are federally designated as Superfund sites and require major cleanup operations, which are ongoing as of 2022.

The river recovered somewhat by the late 2000s, following the decline in manufacturing in the area, as well as from enforcement of Clean Water Act regulations and from the efforts of local conservancy groups. Recreational fishing has staged a modest comeback, although catch and release may be advisable, as health advisories against the consumption of fish caught in the river are continuing. Urban runoff pollution, municipal sewage discharges from sanitary sewer overflows and combined sewer overflows, and runoff from hazardous waste sites continue to impair the river's water quality.

The future of the wetlands around the lower river has been an ongoing controversy between development and preservation groups in recent decades. The Hackensack Meadowlands Development Commission, later called the New Jersey Meadowlands Commission, was established by the state in 1968 to manage development and habitat preservation. The commission was merged into the New Jersey Sports and Exposition Authority in 2015.

The U.S. Environmental Protection Agency (EPA) proposed designating the Lower Hackensack as a Superfund site, which would make it eligible for environmental remediation partially funded by original polluters. In September 2022, the Lower Hackensack was declared a federal Superfund site, formally starting the cleanup process.

== Tributaries ==
=== New Jersey ===
- Berry's Creek
- Bashes Creek
- Cherry Brook
- Moonachie Creek
- Mill Creek
- Cromakill Creek
- Bellmans Creek
- Losen Slote
- Overpeck Creek
- Coles Brook
- French Brook
- Hirshfeld Brook
- Dwars Kill

- Tappan Run

- Pascack Brook
- Holdrum Brook

- Hillsdale Brook

- Cherry Brook

=== New York ===
- Nauraushaun Brook Nanuet, New York
- East Branch Hackensack River
- Toms Creek
- West Branch Hackensack River

== See also ==
- List of New Jersey rivers
- List of New York rivers
- List of crossings of the Hackensack River
- Little Ferry Seaplane Base
- Hackensack RiverWalk
