= Oradell Reservoir =

Reservoir in New Jersey on the Hackensack River

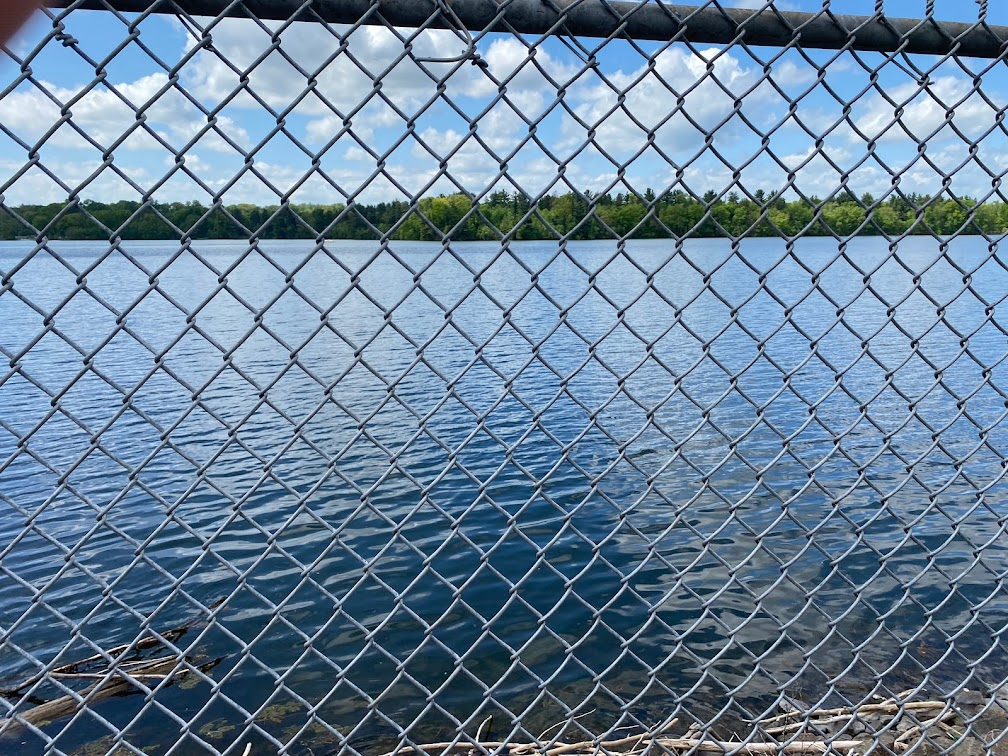
- The Oradell Reservoir

- Location within New Jersey Location within the United States
- Location: Bergen County, New Jersey
- Coordinates: 40.956129°N 74.029001°W
- Lake type: reservoir
- Primary inflows: Hackensack River, Pascack Brook, Dwars Kill
- Primary outflows: Hackensack River
- Basin countries: United States
- Surface elevation: 20 ft (6.1 m)

The Oradell Reservoir is a reservoir formed by the Oradell Dam on the Hackensack River in Bergen County, New Jersey, United States.

== Geography ==
The Oradell Reservoir Dam is located primarily in the borough of Oradell, but the reservoir also extends across the borders of the nearby boroughs of Haworth, Emerson, Closter, and Harrington Park. The reservoir is fed by the Upper Hackensack River, the Pascack Brook and Dwars Kill. The reservoir feeds the Lower Hackensack River via the Oradell Dam. Upstream from the Oradell Reservoir are three other reservoirs: Woodcliff Lake Reservoir, also in Bergen County; Lake DeForest in Rockland County in New York; and Lake Tappan, traversing the borders of Bergen and Rockland counties across the state line. The Oradell Dam was constructed to supply potable water to northern New Jersey and has essentially separated the Hackensack River into two distinct components: the upper river (above the dam) and the lower river (below the dam).

The dam ranges from 25 to 50 feet (7.6 to 15.2 m) from the top to the surface of the river, depending on tide, and it is 402 feet (123 m) long. The dam is primarily used for flood control to dam the reservoir. Directly to the south is the Oradell Avenue road bridge that crosses the Hackensack River.

There is only one bridge to cross the reservoir, which carries CR 502 (Old Hook Road) over from Harrington Park to Closter. It is located in the northern part of the lake and is very important because it saves drivers from having to drive around the reservoir, avoiding the need to drive through towns and residential neighborhoods.

The reservoir is transversed by a CSX Transportation bridge carrying crude oil.

== History ==
Construction on the Oradell Reservoir began in 1901 by the dredging of a mill pond. The mill pond dam was replaced in 1911 by a low timber-crib dam that increased reservoir storage. In 1921, a 22-foot (6.7 m) high concrete Oradell Reservoir Dam was built to expand reservoir storage even more. The reservoir was completed in 1923. The Oradell Reservoir and its tributaries are currently protected with Category 1 water purity status in New Jersey. The reservoir is managed by United Water New Jersey, a unit of Suez North America, a private utility. It provides drinking water for an estimated 750,000 residents of Bergen and Hudson counties.

Because of its environment, the Oradell Reservoir area is very susceptible to flooding. During many storms, such as Hurricane Sandy in 2012 and Hurricane Ida in 2021, the reservoir as well as connecting streams flooded the area and caused many roads to flood and be closed. The bridge that carries Old Hook Road (CR 502) across is considerably low to the surface, and so is often flooded, resulting in closures to the road.

== See also ==
- List of crossings of the Hackensack River
