= Lake Tappan =

Reservoir in New Jersey and New York, United States

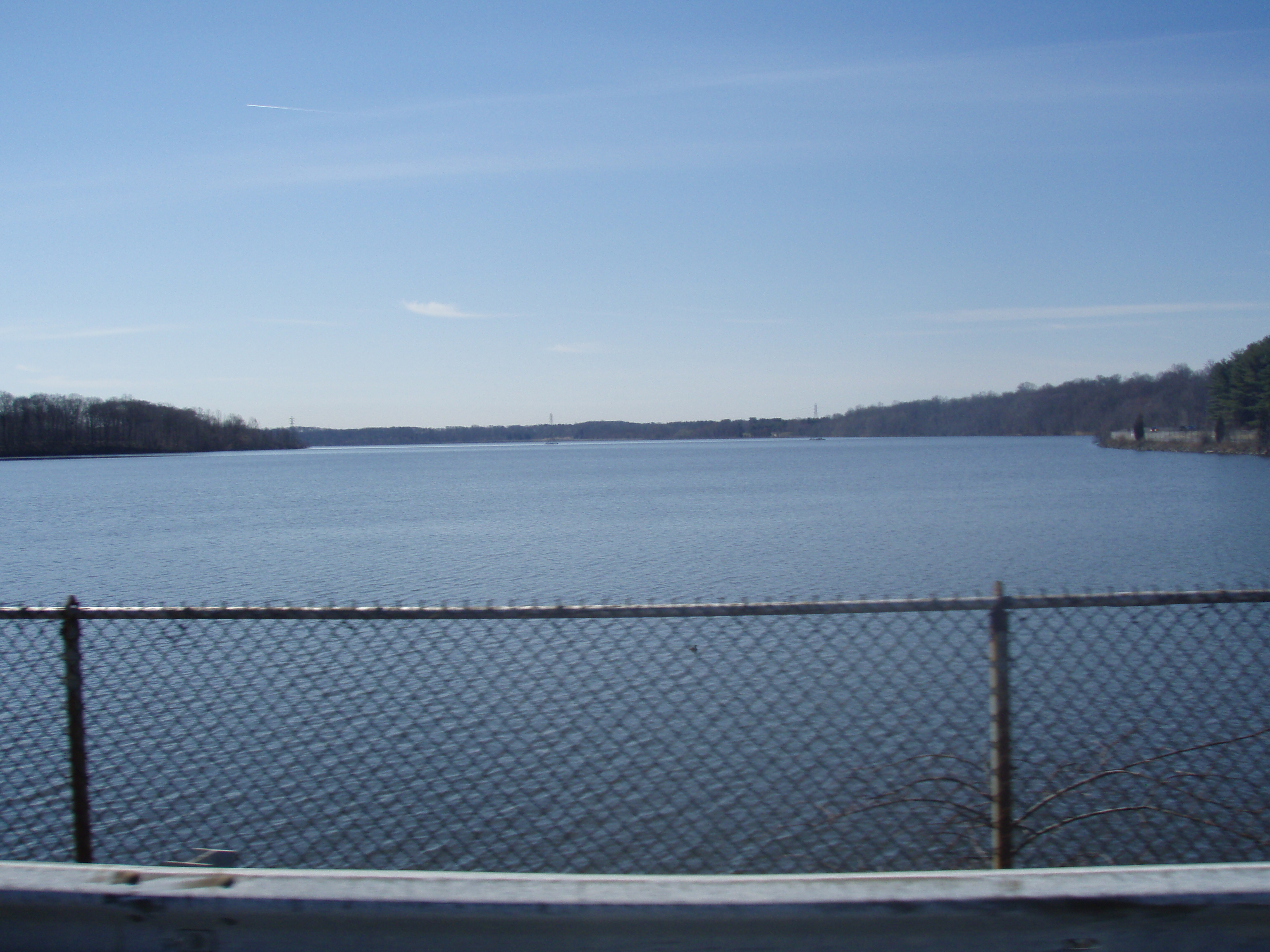

- Location within New Jersey Location within the United States
- Location: Bergen County, New Jersey and Rockland County, New York, United States
- Coordinates: 41.037672°N 73.990000°W
- Lake type: reservoir
- Primary inflows: Hackensack River
- Basin countries: Newark Basin; United States
- Surface area: 1,255 acres (5.08 km^{2})
- Water volume: 3,500,000,000 US gal (13,000,000 m^{3})
- Surface elevation: 56 ft (17 m); 55 ft (17 m)

Lake Tappan is a reservoir impounded by the Tappan Dam on the Hackensack River, straddling the border between the U.S. states of New Jersey and New York. Within New Jersey, the lake traverses the border separating the municipalities of River Vale and Old Tappan in Bergen County, while extending northward across the New York state line into the town of Orangetown in Rockand County. The reservoir was formed in 1967, flooding areas that included the former CAPROC Field Civil Air Patrol airstrip.

The Lake Tappan reservoir covers 1,255 acres (5.1 km^{2}), the majority of its area being within New Jersey, and it contains 3.5 billion US gallons (13,000,000 m^{3}) of water, with up to 12 to 13 million US gallons (45,000 to 49,000 m^{3}) released downstream daily into the Oradell Reservoir, which lies entirely within Bergen County in New Jersey. The passage of this water between reservoirs can occur in as rapidly as two to three hours. Lake Tappan has an average depth of 21' with a maximum depth of 43'.

On March 11, 2003, New Jersey Governor Jim McGreevey visited the reservoir and proposed protecting it as well as the nearby Woodcliff Lake Reservoir and their tributaries with Category 1 water purity status.

The reservoir is owned by Suez North America, a private utility.

Lake Tappan is a local fishing spot as well, serving as a habitat for bluegill, bass, perch, catfish and carp.
