= Suez North America =

- Company type: Subsidiary
- Industry: Utilities
- Founded: 1869
- Headquarters: Paramus, New Jersey, USA
- Key people: Nadine Leslie
- Products: Water treatment, waste management
- Revenue: $764 million (2013)
- Number of employees: 2,350 (2013)
- Parent: Suez Environnement
- Website: www.suez.com/en/north-america

Suez North America is an American water service company headquartered in Paramus, New Jersey. It owns and operates 16 water and waste water utilities, and operates 90 municipal water and waste water systems through public-private partnerships and contract agreements. The company has over 2,300 employees, and in 2013, United Water generated $764 million in revenue, and managed $3.2 billion in total assets. The original business was founded as Hackensack Water Company in 1869 and later named United Water. It became a subsidiary of Suez Environnement, a French-based utility company, in 2000, and changed its name to reflect that of its parent company in 2015.

== History ==
The company was founded as the Hackensack Water Company in 1869 as a water supply and storage company. Adrian Leiby's monograph, The Hackensack Water Company, 1869-1969, provides a history of the company's first century, both covering key people and events and their contemporary context. The company originally served the city of Hackensack and the towns of North Hudson. Over subsequent decades, it extended service to other towns of northern New Jersey and building several reservoirs, including Oradell Reservoir and, in partnership with the Spring Valley Water Company just across the New York state line, Lake DeForest. For a time in the early 20th century, it supplied Hoboken, although Hoboken later switched its water supply to the Jersey City water system.

In 1983 Hackensack Water reorganized into United Water Resources, Inc., and in 1994 it acquired General Waterworks Corporation for $200 million. In 2000, Suez Environnement acquired United Water.

In November 2008, Bertrand Camus became the CEO of Suez North America. In 2014, Engineering News-Record ranked Suez North America third among U.S. providers of water treatment and supply services in the United States.

In April 2014, United Water was given a $5.5 million state tax break from the New Jersey Economic Development Authority to prevent the company from moving its headquarters out of New Jersey and into New York. The company still planned to move out of Harrington Park, considering two New Jersey locations. In June 2015, Suez Environnement opened their new North American Corporate Headquarters in Paramus, New Jersey.

== Activities ==
=== Water partnership model ===
At the 2012 meeting of the Clinton Global Initiative, United Water announced plans to engage private investors and work with municipalities to establish agreements wherein the company would take over operations, maintenance, and capital improvement of water utilities in municipalities across the country, starting with Nassau County, New York and Bayonne, New Jersey. This model received the Partnership Performance of the Year award at the 2012 American Water Summit.

==== Bayonne ====
In December 2012, United Water and KKR, together forming the Bayonne Water Joint Venture (BWJV), entered into a concession agreement with the Municipal Utilities Authority of Bayonne, New Jersey. The 40-year agreement is a public-private partnership between the BWJV and the city under which the private partners addressed the Bayonne Municipal Utility Authority's (BMUA) $130 million debt and take over the operations, maintenance, and capital improvement of Bayonne's water and wastewater utilities in exchange for a regulated share of the revenue. United Water is managing the operations for the partnership, while KKR is providing 90% of the funding.

==== Nassau County ====
In June 2014, Nassau County announced that it had partnered with United Water to operate its three wastewater treatment plants and sewage collection system for 20 years. In exchange for operating the wastewater system and with projected annual savings of at least $10 million, Nassau County will pay United Water $57.4 million annually (adjusted for inflation). The county's financial consultant on the agreement, the PFM Group, estimated savings over the term of the contract at $233.1 million, and up to $378.9 million when synergy savings, including reduced overtime and personnel reassignments, are taken into account. Nassau County will maintain ownership of the wastewater system and jurisdiction over its utility rates, which are not expected to rise.

== See also ==
- New Jersey American Water
- List of crossings of the Hackensack River
