= Essex Generating Station =

- Country: United States of America
- Location: Newark, New Jersey
- Coordinates: 40°44′18″N 74°07′35″W
- Status: Decommissioned
- Commission date: 1915; 1926; 1971; 1990
- Decommission date: June 2022
- Owner: PSE&G

Thermal power station
- Primary fuel: Natural gas
- Turbine technology: Combustion Turbine
- Cooling source: Passaic River

Power generation
- Units operational: 4
- Nameplate capacity: 617 MW

The Essex Generating Station is a peaking power plant on the banks of the Passaic River, three miles east of Downtown in Newark, New Jersey. The station was a major part of New Jersey’s energy infrastructure, transitioning from a coal-fired power plant to a modern peaking facility before closing in 2022. Its history mirrors broader changes in electricity production and grid operations. However, the plant also contributed to environmental issues affecting Newark and surrounding areas. Concerns over pollution, regulatory violations, and environmental justice remain influential in shaping local policy and community efforts.

The station operated in an area with persistent air quality concerns. Emissions of hazardous air pollutants, such as 1,3-butadiene, acetaldehyde, and acrolein, were recorded, although at relatively low levels. The plant is located in the Ironbound neighborhood, an area identified as an environmental justice community due to the cumulative impact of multiple pollution sources, including other fossil fuel facilities and a major waste incinerator.

Owned by the Public Service Electric and Gas Company, it was designed and constructed in 1915–16 and by 1924 six generators had been installed, totaling 214,444 kva.

The plant operated four simple cycle combustion turbines with a combined capacity of 617 MW. Three were brought on line in 1971, and another in 1990. They were later replaced.

The plant sustained extensive damage during Hurricane Sandy, exposing the vulnerability of critical infrastructure to extreme weather events. In response, substantial investments were made in grid hardening and flood protection measures in subsequent years.

It is part of the PJM Interconnection of the Eastern Interconnection grid electric transmission system.

== Historical pollution and violations ==
The Essex Generating Station has a documented history of environmental concerns. In 1973, investigations by the Environmental Protection Agency (EPA) were initiated following reports of improper roof tar disposal and a self-reported oil spill. In 1976, inspectors from the Passaic Valley Sewerage Commission (PVSC) observed Public Service Electric and Gas Company (PSE&G) employees discharging oily water from manholes onto the ground, leading to contamination of the Passaic River. Despite assurances of improved waste management, kerosene leaks and oil sheens on the river continued, prompting state police involvement.

By the late 1990s and early 2000s, the Essex facility was identified as a major contributor to pollution in the Passaic River during EPA Superfund investigations. PSE&G was subsequently requested to participate in the Lower Passaic River Project remediation efforts.

== See also ==
- List of power stations in New Jersey
- Essex County Resource Recovery Facility
- Newark Energy Center
