= Solar power in New Jersey =

Overview of solar power in the U.S. state of New Jersey

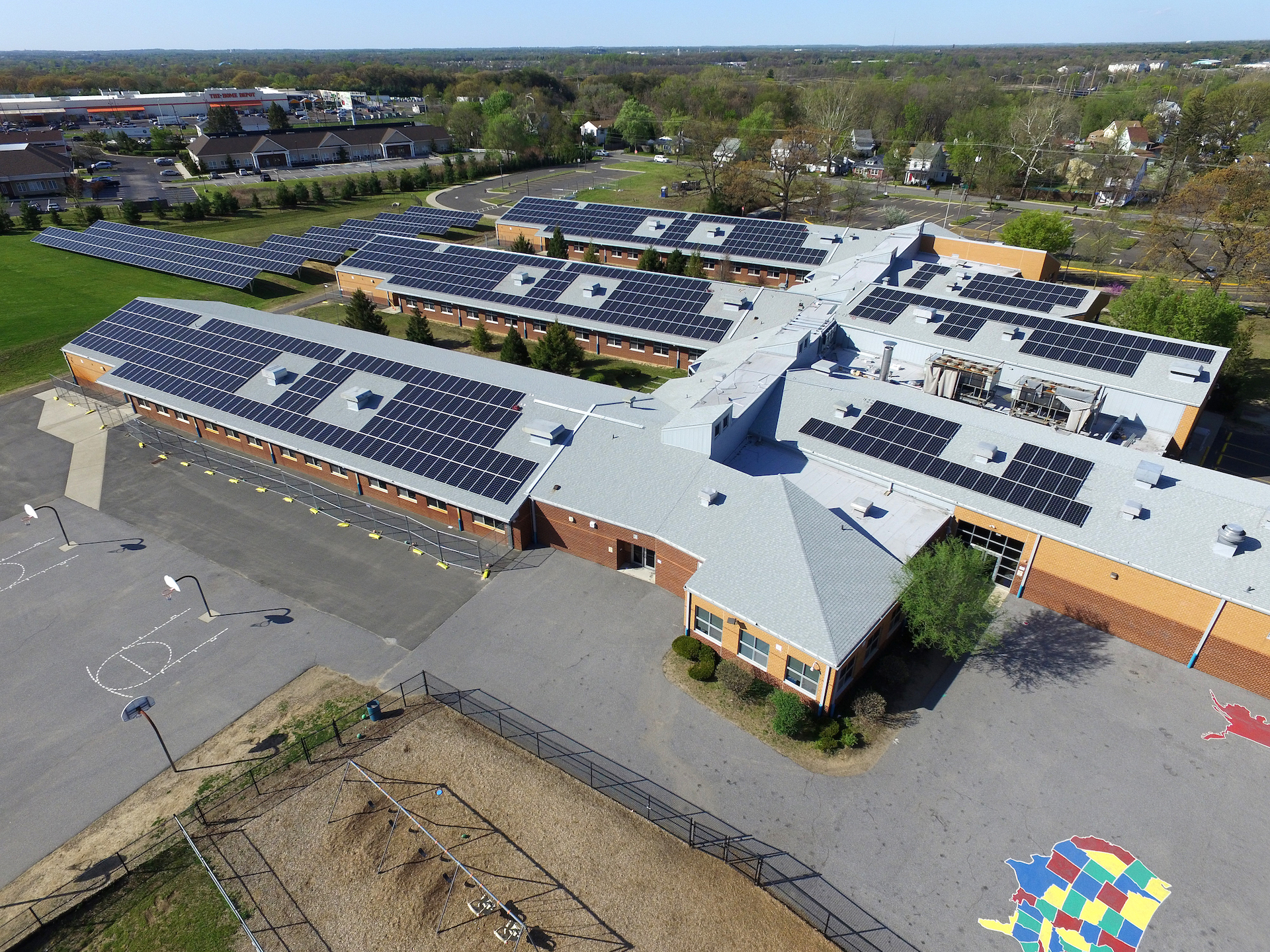
Intermediate school with both rooftop and ground-mount solar panels in Delran

New Jersey had over 4,700 MW of installed solar power capacity as of January 2024, which provides more than 7% of the state's electricity consumption. The state's growth of solar power is aided by a renewable portfolio standard that requires that 22.5% of New Jersey's electricity come from renewable resources by 2021 and 50% by 2030, by incentives provided for generation of solar power, and by one of the most favorable net metering standards in the country, allowing customers of any size array to use net metering, although generation may not exceed annual demand. As of 2018, New Jersey had the sixth-largest installed solar capacity of all U.S. states and the largest installed solar capacity of the Northeastern states.

New Jersey has historically been aggressive in installing solar power, at one point being the second largest solar state in the U.S. with 306.1 megawatts of installed solar power in 2011, which was a 131% increase over the 132.4 megawatts installed in 2010. In 2010, New Jersey became the second state, after California, to install over 100 MW in a single year. The New Jersey Board of Public Utilities administers incentive programs that support the development of the state's solar industry. As of January 2024, over 194,000 solar photovoltaic systems had been installed, with 4,765 MW of capacity. Net-metered projects make up 80% of the installed capacity, 191 grid-supply projects make up 17% of capacity, and 102 community solar projects are 3% of capacity.

New Jersey had 696 schools with 212 MW of solar power installed as of the end of 2023, the second most after California.

== Incentives ==
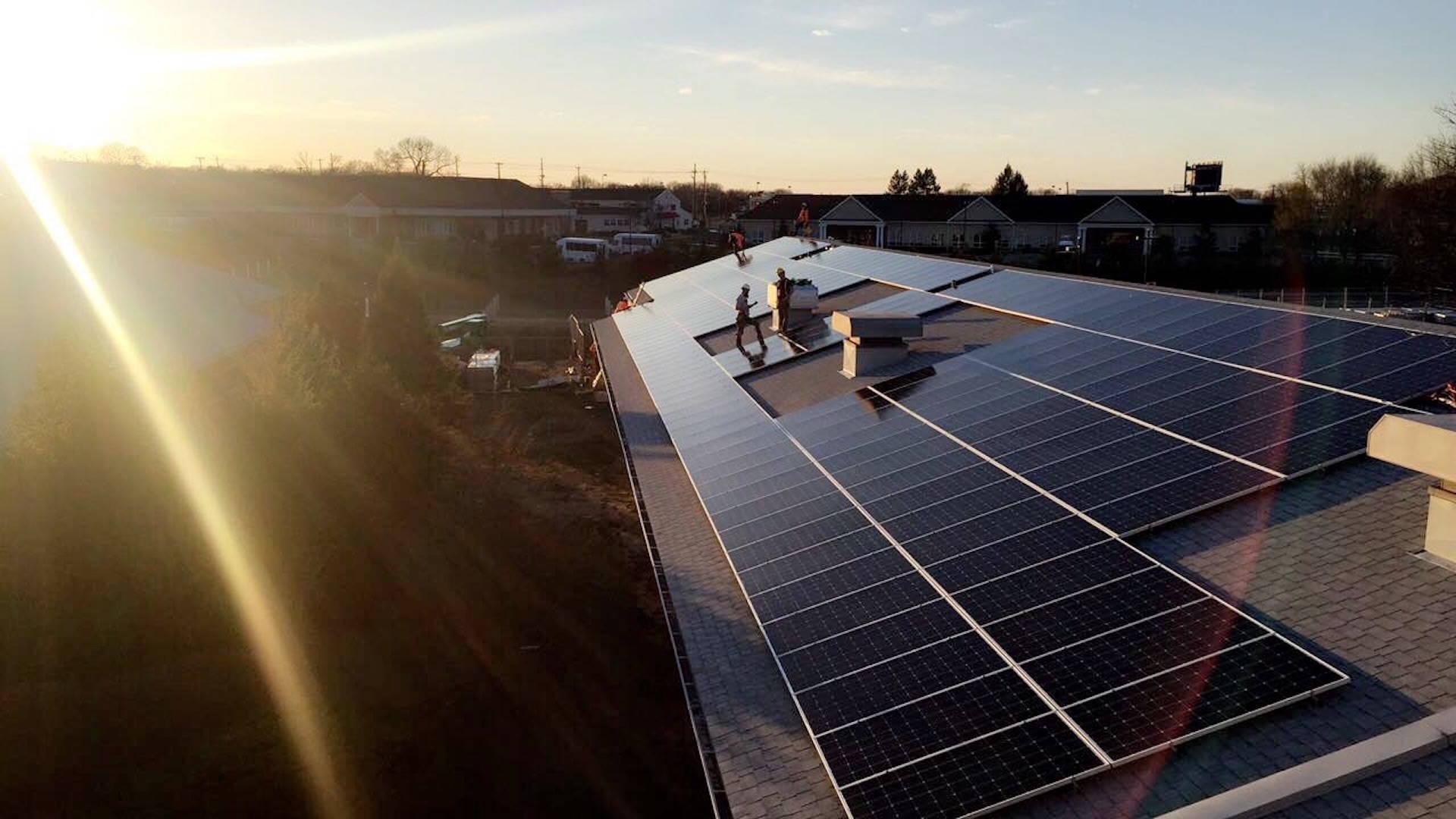
Rooftop installation, Delran

The former New Jersey Clean Energy Program rebates on PV equipment have been discontinued.

The federal Residential Energy Efficient Property Credit (income tax credit on IRS Form 5695) for residential PV and solar thermal was extended in December 2015 to remain at 30% of system cost (parts and installation) for systems put into service by the end of 2019, then 26% until the end of 2020, and then 22% until the end of 2021. It applies to a taxpayer's principal and/or second residences, but not to a property that is rented out. There is no maximum cap on the credit, and the credit can be applied toward the alternative minimum tax, and any excess credit (greater than that year's tax liability) can be rolled into the following year.

NJ law provides new solar power installations with exemptions from the 6.625% state sales tax, and from any increase in property assessment (local property tax increases), subject to certain registration requirements.

=== Renewable portfolio standard ===
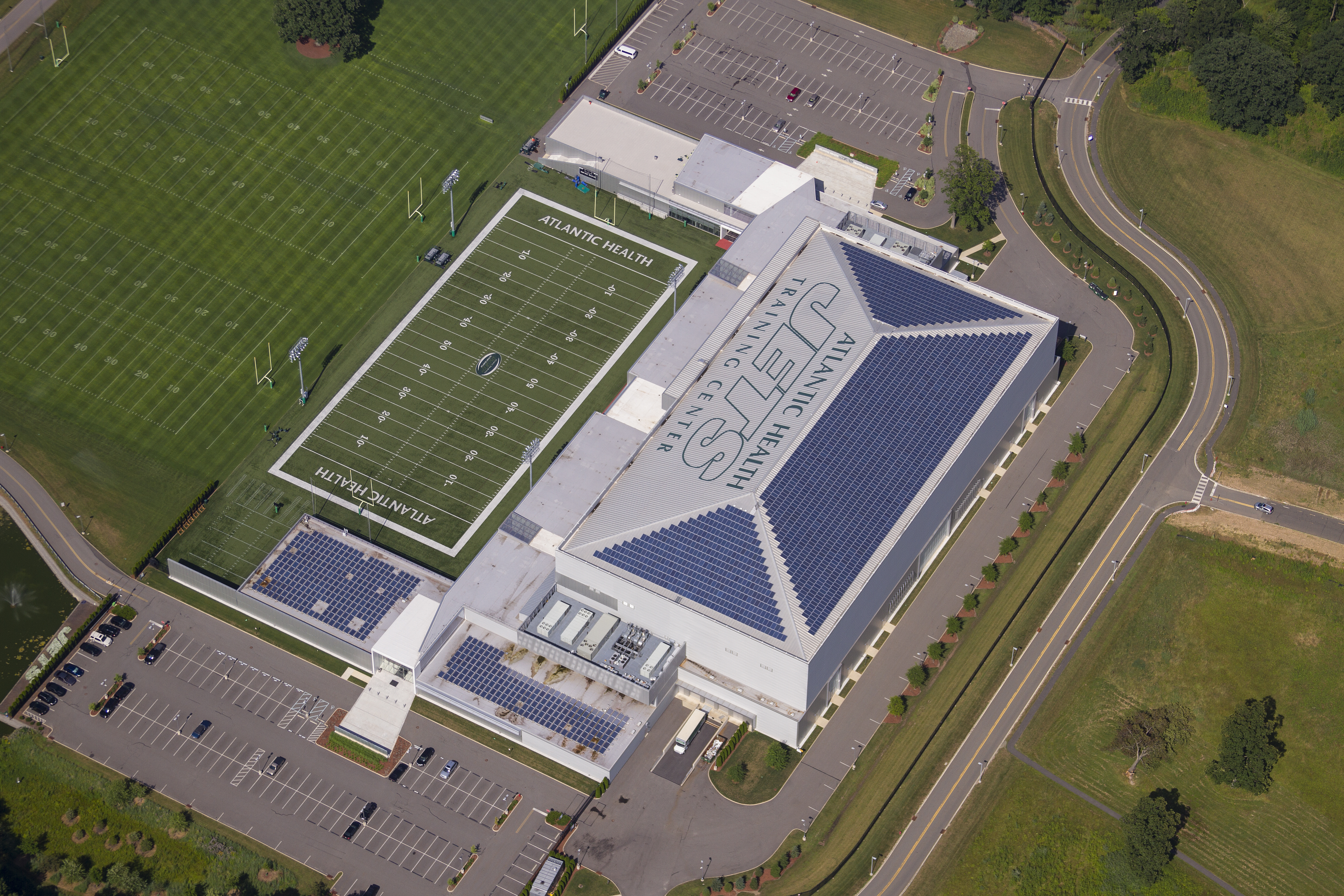
Rooftop solar panels at the New York Jets training facility in Florham Park

New Jersey's renewable portfolio standard (RPS) is one of the most aggressive in the United States and requires each electricity supplier/provider to provide 22.5% from renewable energy sources by 2021 and 50% by 2030. In addition, 2.12% must come from solar electricity, an amount estimated to be 1,500 megawatts (MW). Solar renewable energy certificates (SRECs) must be purchased by electricity suppliers to meet the state targets or else they face a fine known as a Solar Alternative Compliance Payment (SACP) that was $272/MWh in 2022. As New Jersey was approaching the minimum requirements, the requirements were accelerated on July 23, 2012, changing the shape of the compliance curve from slowly increasing at first to rapidly increasing at first.

=== Solar renewable energy certificates ===
In 2004, New Jersey adopted a program promoting the use of solar renewable energy certificates (SRECs) to meet the solar energy carve-out of the state RPS. In the 2011 energy year, 306,000 SRECs (or MWhs of solar electricity) must be purchased by electricity suppliers in the state in order to meet the state solar requirement. That requirement grew to over 5 million in 2026.

An SREC program is an alternative to the feed-in tariff model popular in Europe. The key difference between the two models is the market-based mechanism that drives the value of the SRECs, and therefore the value of the subsidy for solar. In a feed-in tariff model, the government sets the value for the electricity produced by a solar facility. If the level is too high, too much solar power is built and the program is more costly. If the feed-in tariff is set too low, not enough solar power is built and the program is ineffective.

The SREC program allows for the creation of a certificate with every megawatt-hour (MWh) of electricity produced. The certificate represents the solar aspect of the electricity that is produced and can be unbundled and sold separately from the electricity itself. Electricity companies, known as load-serving entities, are required by state RPS laws to procure a certain amount of their electricity from solar. Since it is often more costly for them to build solar farms themselves, the load-serving entities will purchase SRECs from solar generators and use the SRECs to comply with the state laws. With an SREC market, the value of an SREC is determined by supply and demand, subject to certain limitations. If solar is slow to develop, SREC values will remain high, encouraging the development of solar. If too much solar is added, SREC values will decrease, which in turn lowers the attractiveness of the investment. SRECs in New Jersey have traded as high as $680 per MWh. In comparison, the average sale price for the electricity itself ranges from $50 per MWh to $180 per MWh. The value created from the benefits of selling SRECs dwarf the value created by the actual electricity produced in today's market. This means that SRECs play a major role in the return on investment for solar in New Jersey. In 2012 the program was modified in the "solar rescue bill" to increase the value of the SRECs, which have declined in value by 92% but cap them at no more than $325.

The SREC program closed to new registrations in April 2020. A total of 3,335 MW was installed under the SREC program.

The Transition Incentive Program was open to new registrations between October 2019 and August 27, 2021. This program provided fixed incentives called TRECs with different values for different project types. There was no limit to the number of projects that could apply. As of January 2024, 987 MW of projects has been completed under the TI Program.

The Successor Solar Incentive Program opened its Administratively Determined Incentive component on August 28, 2021. This program provides fixes incentives called SREC-IIs to up to 450 MW of small net-metered projects and community solar each year. As of January 2024, 442 MW of projects has been completed under the ADI program.

The Competitive Solar Incentive component was scheduled to begin in 2023, and would provide SREC-IIs priced as part of a competitive solicitation to 300 MW of grid-supply and large net-metered projects each year.

=== Net metering ===
In 2008, New Jersey and Colorado were the only two states to allow unlimited net metering customers, up to 2 megawatts for each customer. In 2010 the limit was removed, and in 2012 connection may be to a 69 kV or lower line voltage, raising the previous requirements. New Jersey is one of three states which have no limit on an individual project's size, although generation may not exceed annual demand, and the Board of Public Utilities originally had the option of limiting participation to 2.5% of peak demand, but the cap was raised to 2.9% in August 2015, which was seen as a temporary fix that would cover three years. In 2018, the legislature increased the net metering cap to 5.8% of retail sales.

== Landfill solar ==
New Jersey's subsection (t) program, established in the Solar Act of 2012, has allowed for the redevelopment of numerous landfill and brownfield sites into solar arrays. The Mount Olive Solar Farm, located on a former Superfund site, is the largest solar project on a landfill in North America and was completed in November 2022. As of April 2023, there were 37 projects with 290 MW of capacity built on closed and repurposed landfills and brownfields. Seventeen projects with 187 MW are on Superfund sites, the most of any state.

== Solar 4 All project ==
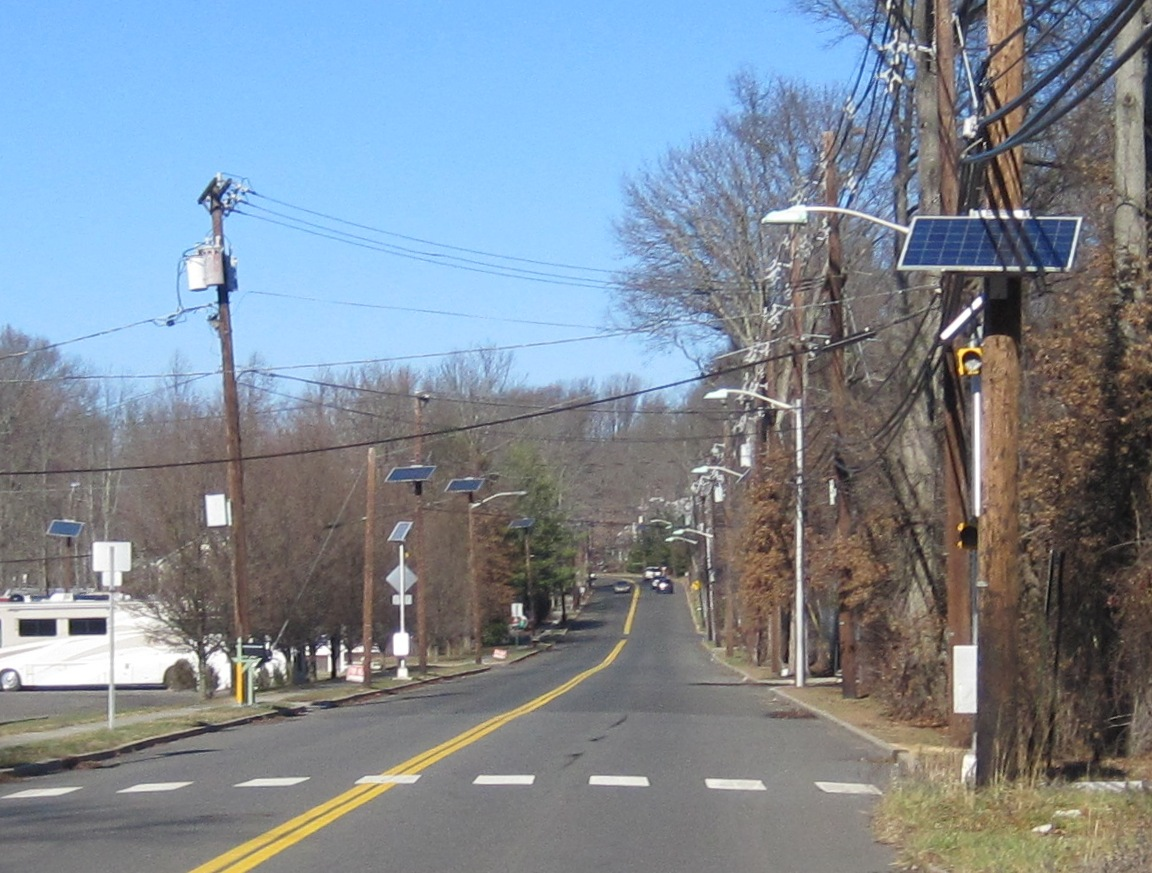
Solar panels on PSE&G utility poles in South Brunswick

In 2009, Public Service Enterprise Group, the largest utility company in New Jersey, announced plans to install solar panels on 200,000 utility poles in its service area, the largest such project in the world. In addition to the 38 MW of pole-mounted power, PSEG's Solar 4 All project built at least 34 solar projects with 152 MW.

== Installed capacity ==
Total photovoltaics
| Year | Total installed solar power (MWp) |
|---|---|
| 2001 | 0.028 |
| 2002 | 0.687 |
| 2003 | 1.81 |
| 2004 | 4.34 |
| 2005 | 13.9 |
| 2006 | 32.2 |
| 2007 | 46.5 |
| 2008 | 74.7 |
| 2009 | 131.2 |
| 2010 | 252.2 |
| 2011 | 699.5 |
| 2012 | 1,032.8 |
| 2013 | 1,253.2 |
| 2014 | 1,456.7 |
| 2015 | 1,652.8 |
| 2016 | 2,061.0 |
| 2017 | 2,411.4 |
| 2018 | 2,738.2 |
| 2019 | 2,908.2 |
| 2020 | 3,592.8 |
| 2021 | 3,854.2 |
| 2022 | 4,411 |

== Generation ==
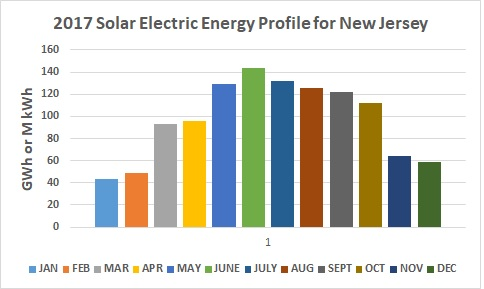
2017 New Jersey solar energy generation profile

Utility-scale solar generation in New Jersey (GWh)
| Year | Total | % of NJ total | % of US solar | Jan | Feb | Mar | Apr | May | Jun | Jul | Aug | Sep | Oct | Nov | Dec |
|---|---|---|---|---|---|---|---|---|---|---|---|---|---|---|---|
| 2009 | 11 | | | 0 | 0 | 1 | 1 | 1 | 1 | 1 | 2 | 2 | 1 | 1 | 0 |
| 2010 | 21 | <0.1% | 1.7% | 0 | 1 | 1 | 2 | 3 | 3 | 3 | 3 | 2 | 1 | 1 | 1 |
| 2011 | 69 | 0.1% | 7% | 1 | 3 | 4 | 6 | 7 | 9 | 8 | 8 | 6 | 7 | 4 | 6 |
| 2012 | 305 | 0.5% | 7% | 17 | 21 | 26 | 32 | 27 | 33 | 32 | 31 | 28 | 21 | 22 | 15 |
| 2013 | 438 | 0.7% | 4.8% | 22 | 23 | 35 | 49 | 44 | 46 | 44 | 38 | 43 | 41 | 31 | 22 |
| 2014 | 514 | 0.75% | 2.9% | 22 | 31 | 43 | 53 | 52 | 56 | 59 | 58 | 49 | 36 | 33 | 22 |
| 2015 | 628 | 0.8% | 2.5% | 34 | 38 | 49 | 63 | 71 | 60 | 67 | 72 | 61 | 53 | 38 | 22 |
| 2016 | 835 | 1.08% | 2.3% | 51 | 45 | 73 | 82 | 74 | 94 | 90 | 88 | 66 | 67 | 61 | 44 |
| 2017 | 924 | 1.22% | 1.74% | 34 | 63 | 81 | 85 | 91 | 108 | 106 | 107 | 91 | 58 | 60 | 40 |
| 2018 | 992 | 1.72% | 1.94% | 57 | 54 | 89 | 89 | 104 | 117 | 124 | 110 | 74 | 69 | 54 | 51 |
| 2019 | 1,165 | | | 63 | 75 | 106 | 101 | 110 | 126 | 142 | 127 | 111 | 80 | 76 | 48 |
| 2020 | 1,592 | | | 83 | 98 | 121 | 148 | 172 | 169 | 186 | 162 | 136 | 126 | 104 | 87 |
| 2021 | 1,203 | | | 89 | 93 | 142 | 164 | 185 | 179 | 173 | 178 | | | | |

Beginning with the 2014 data year, the Energy Information Administration has estimated distributed solar photovoltaic generation and distributed solar photovoltaic capacity. These non-utility scale estimates project that New Jersey generated the following additional solar energy:

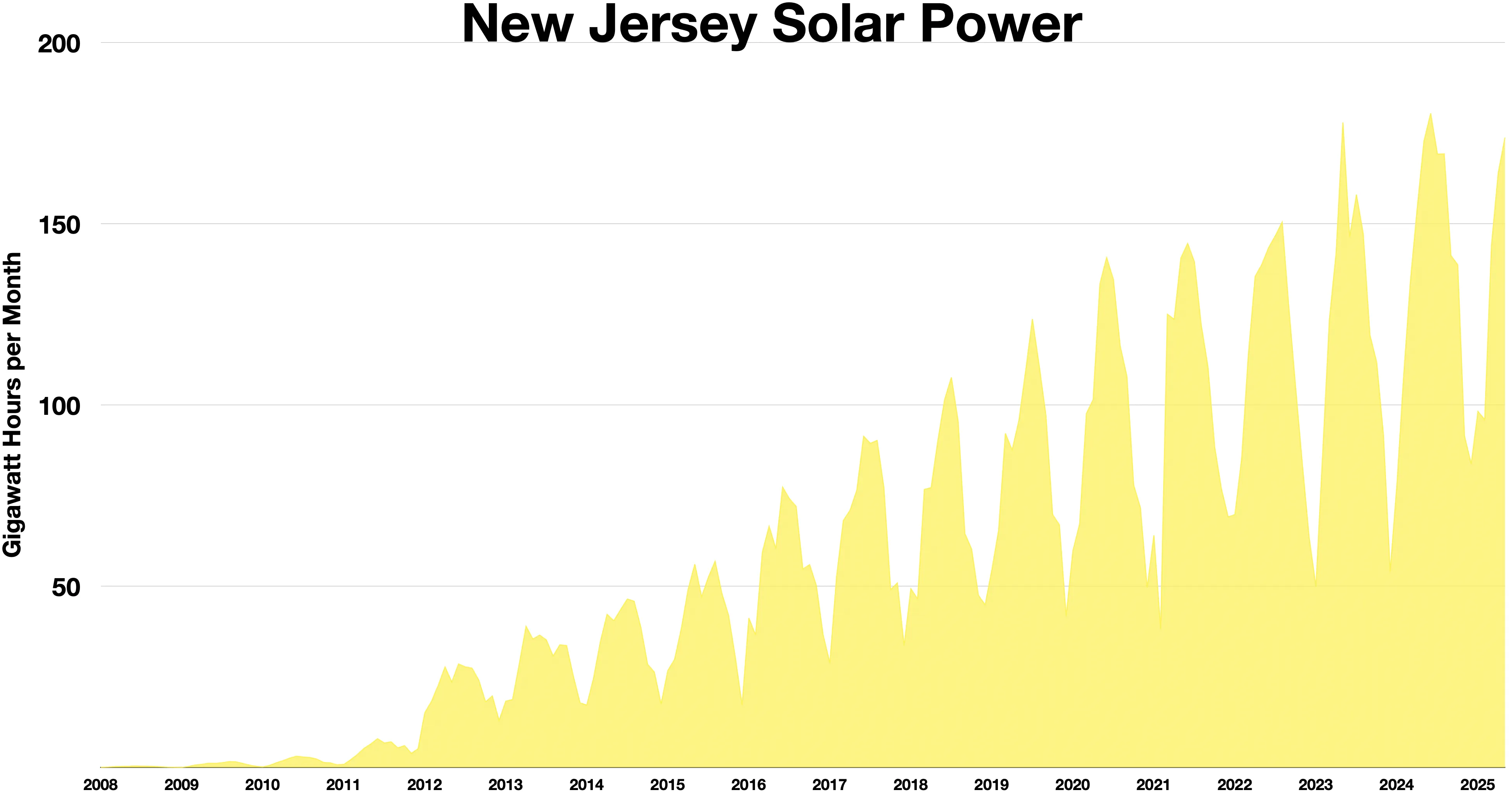
New Jersey solar power generation per month

Estimated distributed solar electric generation in New Jersey
| Year | Summer capacity (MW) | Generation (GWh) |
|---|---|---|
| 2014 | | 1,106 |
| 2015 | 1,026.4 | 1,435 |
| 2016 | 1,058.2 | 1,385 |
| 2017 | 1,285.6 | 1,660 |
| 2018 | 1,490.9 | 1,927 |

== Facilities ==
As of September 2024, New Jersey has more than 90 photovoltaic installations of over 5 MW, which have a cumulative capacity of over 850 MW, and over 560 projects of over 1 MW, with a cumulative utility-scale capacity of 1,825 MW. Small-scale capacity is 3,131 MW. Most of these are net-metered. The largest in the state include (incomplete list; selected projects):

| Name | Location | Capacity (MWdc) | Commissioned | Notes |
|---|---|---|---|---|
| Ben Moreell Solar Farm, Naval Weapons Station Earle | Tinton Falls | 28.5 | 2015 | Superfund site |
| Berry Plastics | Phillipsburg | 13.1 | 2013 | Net metered |
| Changewater Solar Farm | Washington Township | 14.8 | 2026 | Landfill/brownfield site |
| Combe Fill South Landfill | Chester Township | 17.8 | 2025 | Landfill/brownfield and Superfund site |
| DSM Solar | Belvidere | 20.2 | 2019 | Net metered (three projects on site) |
| Fort Dix Landfill | Lakehurst | 16.5 | 2017 | Landfill/brownfield and Superfund site |
| Foul Rift Solar Farm | White Township | 18.9 | 2025 | Landfill/brownfield site |
| Frenchtown Solar III | Kingwood Township | 10.0 | 2013 | |
| Holt Logistics Gloucester Terminal | Gloucester City | 10.1 | 2012 | Net metered, largest rooftop solar project in the US when completed (9 MW), 1.1 MW added in 2018 |
| McGraw-Hill Companies | East Windsor | 14.1 | 2012 | |
| Monroe Solar Farm | Monroe Township | 12.0 | 2020 | Landfill/brownfield site |
| Mount Olive – Combe Fill North Landfill | Mount Olive Township | 25.6 | 2023 | Landfill/brownfield and Superfund site, largest landfill solar project in the US |
| New Jersey Oak Solar | Fairfield Township | 12.5 | 2012 | |
| Pilesgrove Solar Farm | Pilesgrove Township | 19.9 | 2011 | |
| Quakertown Solar Farm II | Franklin Township | 12.3 | 2025 | |
| SC Holdings | Cinnaminson | 13.0 | 2019 | Landfill/brownfield and Superfund site |
| Seashore Solar | Egg Harbor Township | 10.6 | 2016 | Landfill/brownfield site |
| Six Flags Solar | Jackson Township | 23.5 | 2019 | Net metered, ground mount and carport |
| Tinton Falls Solar Farm | Tinton Falls | 19.9 | 2012 | Landfill/brownfield site |
| Toms River Merchant Solar | Toms River | 27.3 | 2021 | Landfill/brownfield and Superfund site |
| Vineland Construction Co. | Pennsauken Township | 15.1 | 2019 | Landfill/brownfield site |
| Vineland Solar | Vineland | 15.0 | 2026 | Landfill/brownfield site |

New Jersey also has the Americas' largest floating solar array, an 8.9 MW project at New Jersey American Water's treatment plant in Millburn that was completed in 2022. The 4.4 MW system in Sayreville was the largest in the country when it was built in 2020. A 3.3 MW project at a sand company puts the state's installed floating solar capacity at 16.6 MW, greater than the rest of North America combined.

== See also ==
- Wind power in New Jersey
- List of power stations in New Jersey
- Solar power in the United States
- Renewable energy in the United States
