= List of power stations in New Jersey =

Sources of New Jersey utility-scale electricity generation in gigawatt-hours, full-year 2025:
1. Natural gas: 29,611 (48.5%)
2. Nuclear: 27,918 (45.7%)
3. Solar: 1,993 (3.26%)
4. Biomass: 611 (1.00%)
5. Other gases: 210 (0.34%)
6. Petroleum: 129 (0.21%)
7. Other: 622 (1.02%)

This is a list of electricity-generating power stations in the U.S. state of New Jersey, sorted by type and name. In 2024, New Jersey had a total summer capacity of 16.6 GW through all of its power plants, and a net generation of 60,175 GWh. In 2025, the electrical energy generation mix was 48.5% natural gas, 45.7% nuclear, 3.3% solar, 1% biomass, 0.3% other gases, 0.2% petroleum, and 1% other. Small-scale solar, which includes customer-owned PV panels, delivered an additional net 3,820 GWh of energy to the state's electrical grid during 2025. This was nearly twice the generation of New Jersey's utility-scale PV plants.

New Jersey's renewable portfolio standard was updated in 2018 to require that 21% of electricity be from renewable sources by 2021, 35% by 2025, and 50% by 2030. In February 2023, Governor Phil Murphy set a goal of 100% clean electricity (including non-renewable zero-emissions sources) by 2035. About 75% of in-state renewable generation came from small- and large-scale solar photovoltaics (PV) that year.

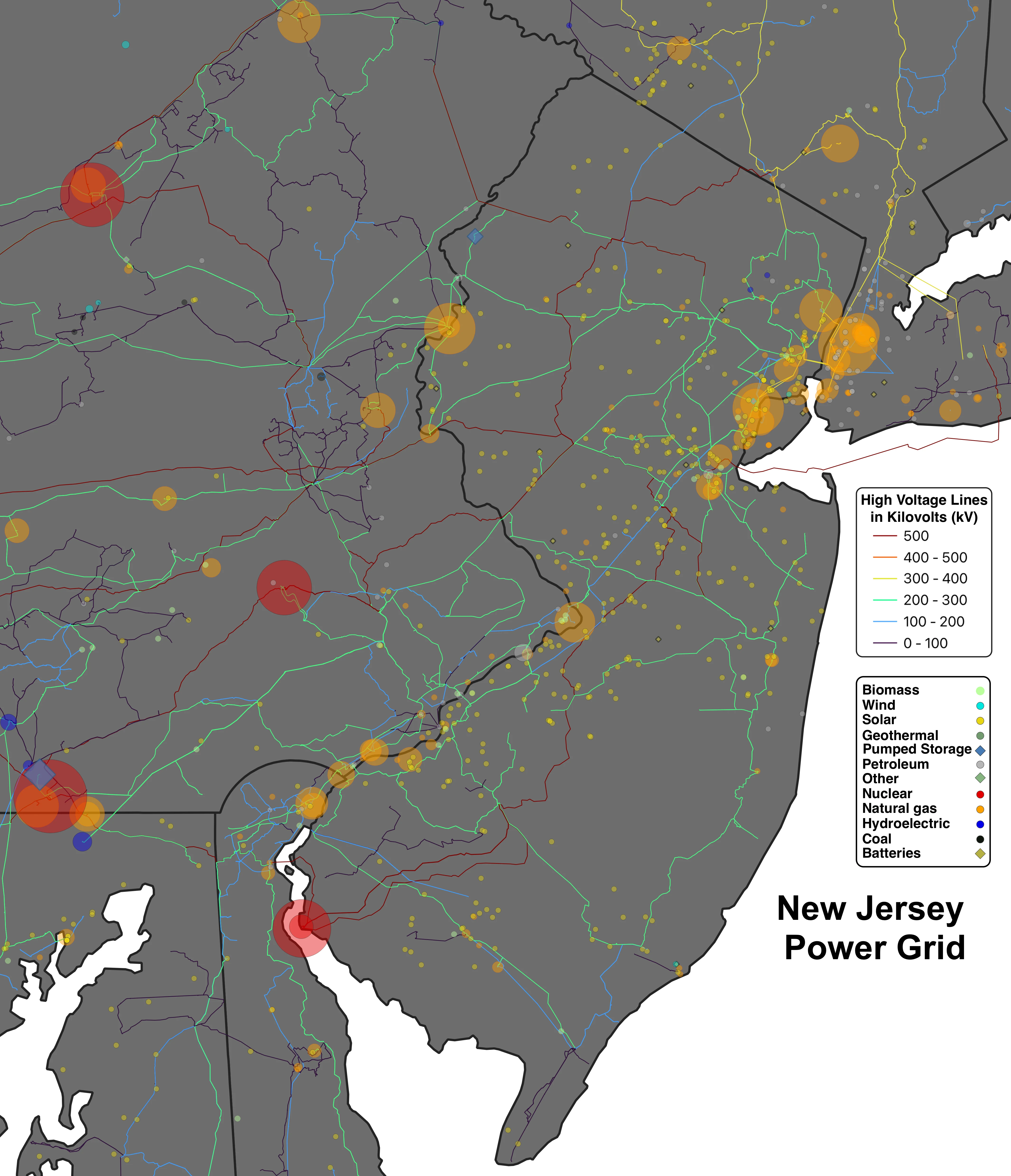
New Jersey power grid

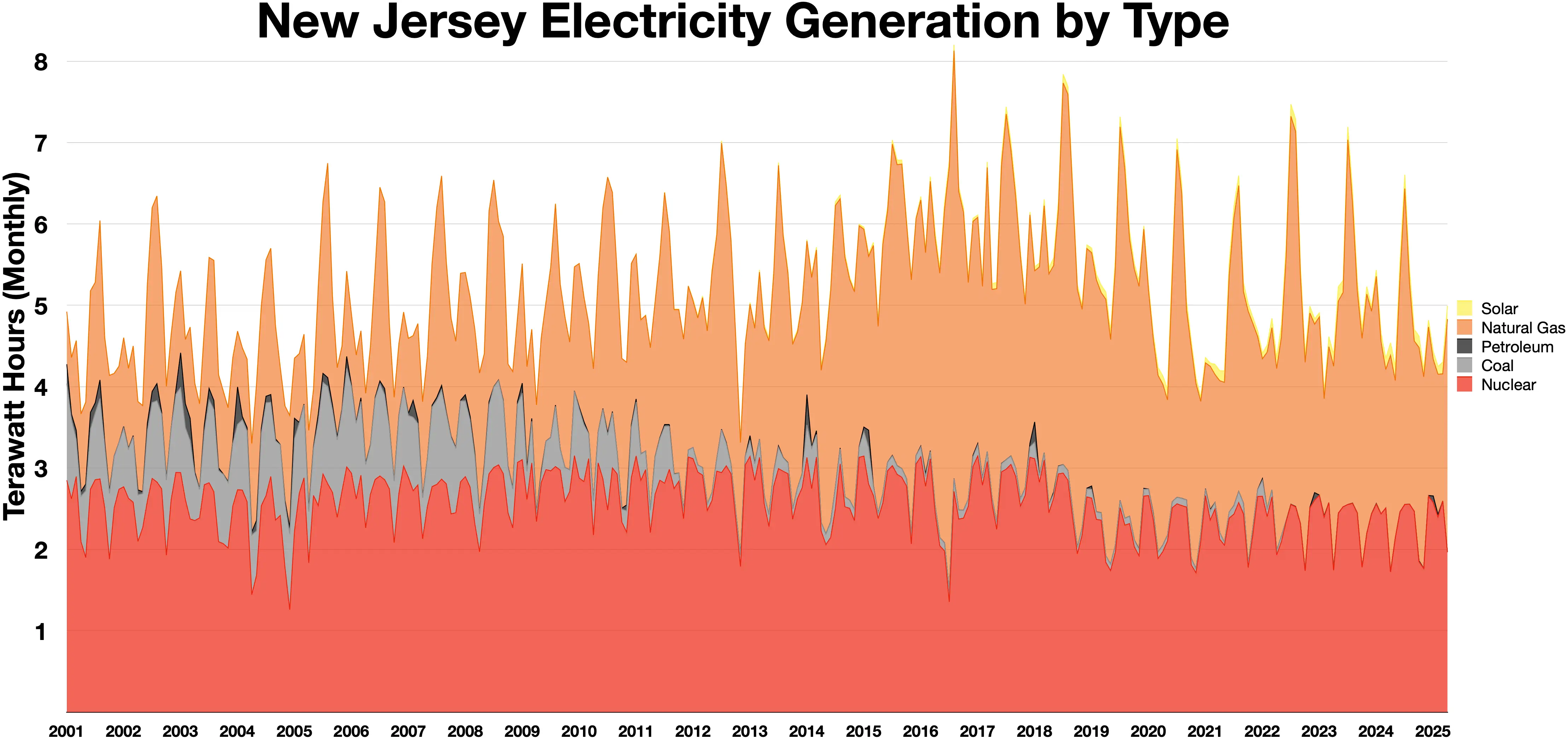
New Jersey electricity generation by type

== Nuclear power stations ==
There are two nuclear power stations in New Jersey both operated by PSEG Nuclear. The Oyster Creek Nuclear Generating Station in Lacey Township, owned and operated by Oyster Creek Environmental Protection, permanently ceased operations on September 17, 2018.

Plant	Location	Coords.	Capacity (MW)	Commissioned	Ref
Hope Creek Nuclear Generating Station	Lower Alloways Creek	39°28′00″N 75°32′16″W	1173	1986	
Salem Nuclear Power Plant	Lower Alloways Creek	39°27′45″N 75°32′09″W	2285	1977 for I 1981 for II	

== Fossil-fuel power stations ==
Data from the U.S. Energy Information Administration serves as a general reference.

=== Natural gas ===
Plant	Location	Coords.	Capacity (MW)	Generation type	Commissioned	Notes
Bayonne Energy Center	Bayonne	40°39′10″N 74°05′30″W	644	Simple cycle (x10)	2012	Con Ed Brooklyn
Bergen Generating Station	Ridgefield	40°50′15″N 74°01′28″W	1229	4x1 combined cycle, 2x1 combined cycle	1957/1995 (638MW); 2002 (591MW)	Hudson Project
Burlington Generating Station	Burlington	40°04′36″N 74°52′45″W	168	Simple cycle (x4)	2000	PSEG
Eagle Point Power Generation	Gloucester County	39°52′29″N 75°09′33″W	244	2x2 combined cycle	1991/2016	
Essex Generating Station	Newark	40°44′18″N 74°07′35″W	81	2x simple cycle	1990	PSEG Decommissioned 2022
Gilbert	Hunterdon County	40°33′57″N 75°09′50″W	294	4x1 combined cycle	1974/1977	
Kearny Generating Station	South Kearny	40°44′14″N 74°05′47″W	456	Simple cycle (x10)	Originally 1925	PSEG
Linden Cogen Plant	Linden	40°37′56″N 74°12′56″W	974	6x3 combined cycle	1989	Also furnishes steam for Phillips 66 refinery
Linden Generating Station	Linden	40°37′18″N 74°12′26″W	1566	Simple cycle (x4), 2x1 combined cycle (x2)	1995/2000 (336MW); 2006 (1230MW)	PSEG
NAEA Lakewood	Lakewood	40°03′41″N 74°10′07″W	573	2x1 combined cycle, simple cycle (x2)	1994 (248MW); 2003 (325MW)	
Newark Bay Cogen	Newark	40°43′11″N 74°07′33″W	136	2x1 combined cycle	1993	Retired 2022
Newark Energy Center	Newark	40°42′26″N 74°07′33″W	705	2x1 combined cycle	2015	Energy Investors Fund
Parlin Power Plant	Parlin	40°27′39″N 74°19′38″W	115	2x2 combined cycle	1991	
Paulsboro Refinery	Gloucester County	39°50′24″N 75°15′30″W	67	Steam turbine (x3), simple cycle	1982/2006 (40MW); 1991 (27MW)	Also burns petroleum coke and other gases
Pedricktown Cogen	Salem County	39°46′00″N 75°25′26″W	115	1x1 combined cycle	1992	
Red Oak	Middlesex County	40°26′55″N 74°20′56″W	823	3x1 combined cycle	2002	Carlyle Group
Sayreville	Sayreville	40°28′35″N 74°21′08″W	200	Simple cycle (x4)	1991	JCP&L
Sayreville Energy Center	Sayreville	40°26′20″N 74°20′40″W	315	2x1 combined cycle	1991	Neptune Cable
Sewaren Generating Station	Sewaren, Middlesex County	40°33′21″N 74°14′49″W	538	1x1 combined cycle	2018	PSEG
West Deptford Energy Station	Deptford	39°50′29″N 75°13′17″W	740	2x1 combined cycle	2014	
Woodbridge Energy Center	Woodbridge	40°30′54″N 74°19′08″W	725	2x1 combined cycle	2015	MCUA furnishes plant's cooling tower water.

=== Petroleum ===
Plant	Location	Coords.	Capacity (MW)	Generation type	Commissioned	Notes
Bayville Central Facility	Bayville	39°54′34″N 74°10′41″W	6.9	Reciprocating engine (x7)	1988/2000	includes ~1MW biofuel
Gilbert	Hunterdon County	40°33′57″N 75°09′50″W	150	Simple cycle	1996	
Haworth Water Treatment Plant	Bergen County	40°57′33″N 74°00′54″W	7.8	Reciprocating engine (x2)	2018	
Salem Generating Station	Salem County	39°27′45″N 75°32′09″W	38.4	Simple cycle	1971	PSEG
West Station	Cumberland County	39°29′28″N 75°02′55″W	22.9	Simple cycle	1972	

== Renewable power stations ==
Data from the U.S. Energy Information Administration serves as a general reference.

=== Biomass and municipal waste ===
Additional data from New Jersey Department of Environmental Protection

Plant	Location	Coords.	Capacity (MW)	Fuel type	Generation type	Commissioned	Ref
Atlantic County Landfill	Atlantic County	39°25′03″N 74°32′32″W	3.3	Landfill gas	Reciprocating engine (x2)	2005	
Burlington County Landfill	Burlington County	40°04′27″N 74°39′56″W	7.0	Landfill gas	Reciprocating engine (x5)	2007	
Camden County Resource Recovery Facility	Camden	39°54′33″N 75°07′01″W	33.0	Municipal solid waste (biogenic and non-biogenic)	Steam turbine	1991	
Cinnamon Bay Edgeboro Landfill	Middlesex County	40°27′55″N 74°23′38″W	9.1	Landfill gas	Reciprocating engine	2011	
Essex County Resource Recovery Facility	Newark	40°44′18″N 74°07′35″W	60.0	Municipal solid waste (biogenic and non-biogenic)	Steam turbine (x2)	1990	
Gloucester County Resource Recovery Facility	Westville	39°52′24″N 75°08′17″W	12.0	Municipal solid waste (biogenic and non-biogenic)	Steam turbine	1990	
Middlesex Generating Facility	Middlesex	40°29′25″N 74°18′56″W	18.8	Landfill gas	Reciprocating engine (x3)	1961/2001	
Ocean County Landfill	Ocean County	40°01′30″N 74°15′00″W	13.8	Landfill gas	Reciprocating engine (x12)	1997/2006	
Pennsauken Landfill	Camden County	39°59′22″N 75°02′24″W	1.8	Landfill gas	Reciprocating engine (x2)	2004	
Salem County Landfill	Salem County	39°35′20″N 75°22′35″W	1.8	Landfill gas	Reciprocating engine	2008	
Sussex Landfill Energy	Sussex County	41°05′37″N 74°40′44″W	3.0	Landfill gas	Reciprocating engine (x2)	2011	
Union County Resource Recovery Facility	Rahway	40°36′05″N 74°15′59″W	37.5	Municipal solid waste (biogenic and non-biogenic)	Steam turbine	1994	
Woodbine Landfill Plant	Cape May County	39°13′52″N 74°46′51″W	2.1	Landfill gas	Reciprocating engine	2013	

=== Hydroelectric ===
Plant	Location	Coords.	Capacity (MW)	Number of turbines	Commissioned	Ref
Great Falls (Passaic River)	Paterson	40°54′55″N 74°10′52″W	10.95	3	1986	
Passaic Valley Water Commission	Passaic County	40°53′00″N 74°13′48″W	2.4	4	1935	

=== Wind farms ===
Name	Location	Coords.	Capacity (MW)	Number of turbines	Commissioned	Ref
Bayonne MUA	Bayonne	40°39′10″N 74°07′04″W	1.5	1	2012	
Jersey-Atlantic Wind Farm	Atlantic City	39°22′56″N 74°26′51″W	7.5	5	2005	

=== Photovoltaic ===
As of September 2024, New Jersey has more than 90 photovoltaic installations of over 5 MW, which have a cumulative capacity of over 850 MW, and over 560 projects of over 1 MW, with a cumulative utility-scale capacity of 1,825 MW. Small-scale capacity is 3,131 MW. Most of these are net-metered. The largest in the state include (incomplete list; selected projects):

Name	Location	Capacity (MWdc)	Commissioned	Notes
Ben Moreell Solar Farm, Naval Weapons Station Earle	Tinton Falls	28.5	2015	Superfund site
Berry Plastics	Phillipsburg	13.1	2013	Net metered
Changewater Solar Farm	Washington Township	14.8	2026	Landfill/brownfield site
Combe Fill South Landfill	Chester Township	17.8	2025	Landfill/brownfield and Superfund site
DSM Solar	Belvidere	20.2	2019	Net metered (three projects on site)
Fort Dix Landfill	Lakehurst	16.5	2017	Landfill/brownfield and Superfund site
Foul Rift Solar Farm	White Township	18.9	2025	Landfill/brownfield site
Frenchtown Solar III	Kingwood Township	10.0	2013	
Holt Logistics Gloucester Terminal	Gloucester City	10.1	2012	Net metered, largest rooftop solar project in the US when completed (9 MW), 1.1 MW added in 2018
McGraw-Hill Companies	East Windsor	14.1	2012	
Monroe Solar Farm	Monroe Township	12.0	2020	Landfill/brownfield site
Mount Olive – Combe Fill North Landfill	Mount Olive Township	25.6	2023	Landfill/brownfield and Superfund site, largest landfill solar project in the US
New Jersey Oak Solar	Fairfield Township	12.5	2012	
Pilesgrove Solar Farm	Pilesgrove Township	19.9	2011	
Quakertown Solar Farm II	Franklin Township	12.3	2025	
SC Holdings	Cinnaminson	13.0	2019	Landfill/brownfield and Superfund site
Seashore Solar	Egg Harbor Township	10.6	2016	Landfill/brownfield site
Six Flags Solar	Jackson Township	23.5	2019	Net metered, ground mount and carport
Tinton Falls Solar Farm	Tinton Falls	19.9	2012	Landfill/brownfield site
Toms River Merchant Solar	Toms River	27.3	2021	Landfill/brownfield and Superfund site
Vineland Construction Co.	Pennsauken Township	15.1	2019	Landfill/brownfield site
Vineland Solar	Vineland	15.0	2026	Landfill/brownfield site

== Storage power stations ==
Data from the U.S. Energy Information Administration serves as a general reference.

=== Battery storage ===
Plant	Location	Coords.	Capacity (MW)	Commissioned	Ref
ACUA Storage	Atlantic County	39°22′55″N 74°26′42″W	1.0	2018	
Caldwell Wastewater Treatment Hybrid	Essex County	40°50′19″N 74°18′45″W	1.0	2016	
Hopewell Valley High School Hybrid	Mercer County	40°19′41″N 74°48′18″W	1.0	2015	
Plumsted 537 BESS	Ocean County	40°06′34″N 74°29′52″W	19.8	2019	
Stryker 22 BESS	Warren County	40°39′55″N 75°08′40″W	19.8	2018	

=== Pumped storage ===
Plant	Location	Coords.	Capacity (MW)	Number of turbines	Commissioned	Ref
Yards Creek Generating Station	Blairstown & Hardwick	41°00′02″N 75°01′53″W	420	3	1965	

== Decommissioned plants ==
Plant	Location	Coords	Capacity (MW)	Source	Commissioned	Decommissioned	Notes
B.L. England Generating Station (Beesley's Point Generating Station)	Upper Township		450	Coal	1961	May 1, 2019	
Chambers Carneys Point Cogen Generating Plant	Carneys Point Township	39°41′37″N 75°29′09″W	244	Coal	1993	June 2022	
Hudson Generating Station	Jersey City		660	Coal	1968	May 31, 2017	
Logan Generating Plant	Logan Township	39°47′34″N 75°24′24″W	219	Coal	1994	June 2022	
Mercer Generating Station	Hamilton Township		360	Coal	1960	May 31, 2017	
Oyster Creek Nuclear Generating Station	Lacey Township		652	Nuclear	1969	September 17, 2018	

== See also ==
- Hudson Project
- PJM Interconnection
- List of power stations in the United States
- List of electric companies in New Jersey
