= PSEG =

PSEG may refer to:

- Public Service Enterprise Group, a utility company
- Punitive segregation, another term for solitary confinement
- UDP-2,4-diacetamido-2,4,6-trideoxy-beta-L-altropyranose hydrolase, an enzyme
