= Kearny Generating Station =

New Jersey power station

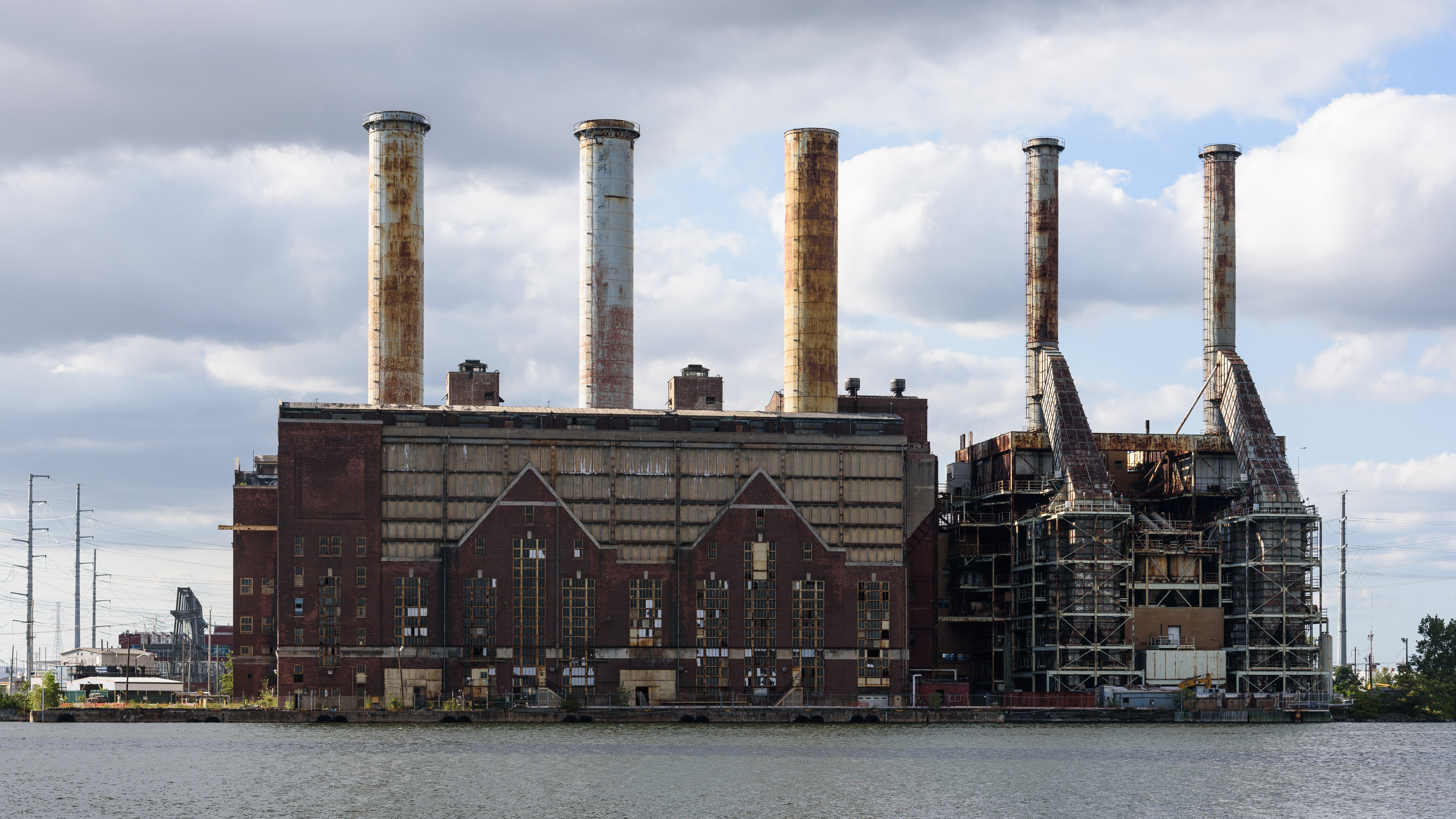
- Country: United States
- Location: South Kearny, New Jersey
- Coordinates: 40°44′14″N 74°05′56″W
- Status: Operational
- Commission date: 1923; 1954; 2012
- Owner: PSE&G
- Operator: Public Service Enterprise Group

Thermal power station
- Primary fuel: Natural gas
- Turbine technology: Combustion turbine
- Cooling source: Hackensack River

Power generation
- Nameplate capacity: 605 MW

External links
- Commons: Related media on Commons

Kearny Generating Station is a peaking power plant on the banks of the Riverbend of the Hackensack River in South Kearny, New Jersey. Owned and operated by Public Service Electric and Gas Company (PSEG) the power station consists of 10 simple cycle combustion turbines totaling 456 MW. It is part of the PJM Interconnection of the Eastern Interconnection grid electric transmission system.

== History ==
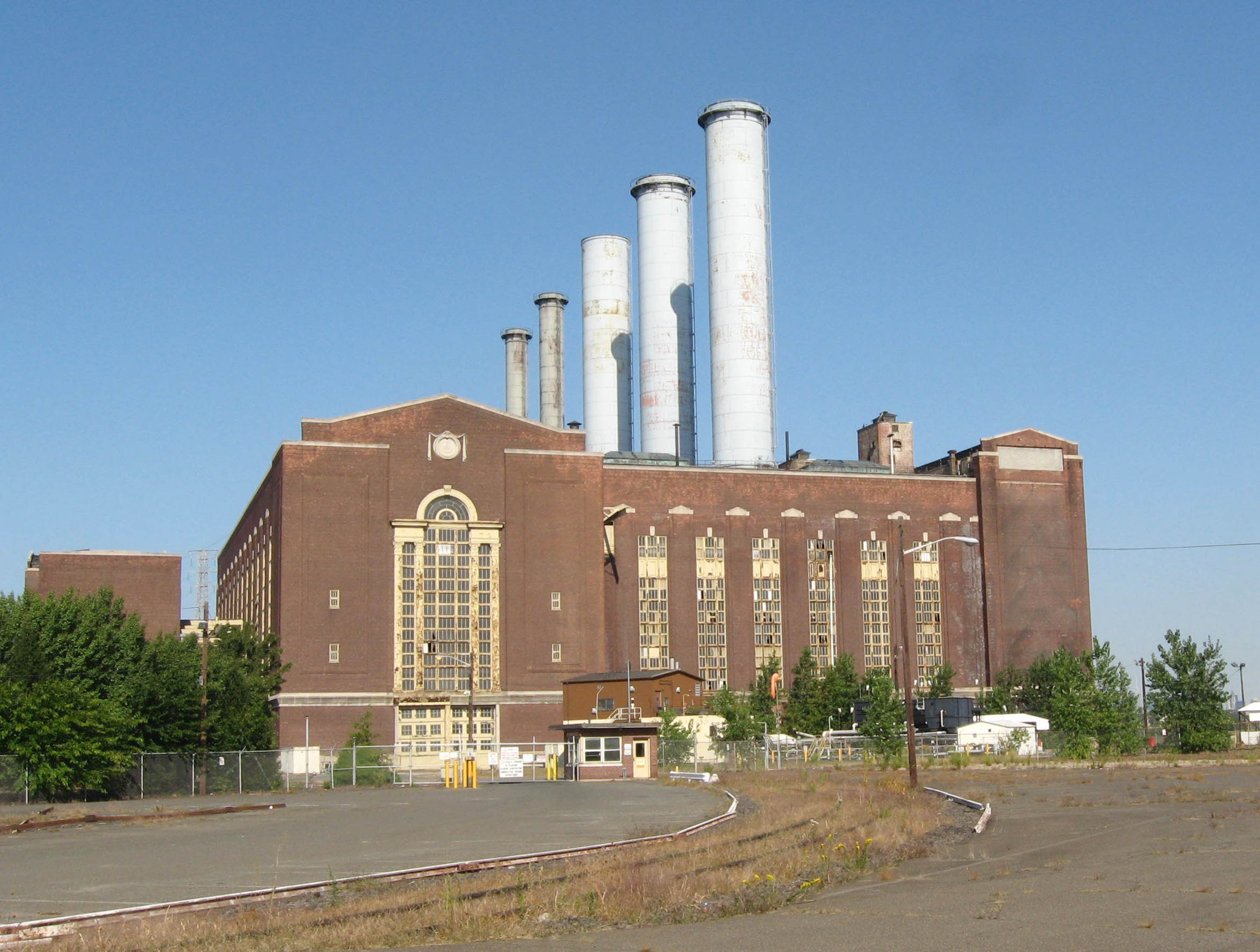
Original building in Kearny Meadows

Ground was broken for the original Kearny Station on July 12, 1923. Thomas A. Edison helped inaugurate and synchronize this AC station in 1925. At that time it was the largest electric generating station in New Jersey. The plant originally had six coal-fired units, which were converted to oil, all of which have subsequently been retired, the last in 2006.

Starting in 1933, a GE Binary Mercury Steam Turbine Generator system was operated at the Kearney Station, composed of a 20-MW mercury vapour turbine and a 30-MW steam turbine.

Starting in 1967, the steam units were supplemented by peaker units, three of which have been since retired. There are ten simple-cycle peaker units, four of which burn natural gas and liquid fuel that went commercial in 2001 and the remaining six are only natural gas which went commercial 2012.

In October 2012, six new GE LM6000 natural gas-fired units capable of producing over 270 net megawatts of power were put into use.

== See also ==
- Essex County Resource Recovery Facility
- List of power stations in New Jersey
