= Marion Section =

Populated place in Hudson County, New Jersey, US

- Neighborhood
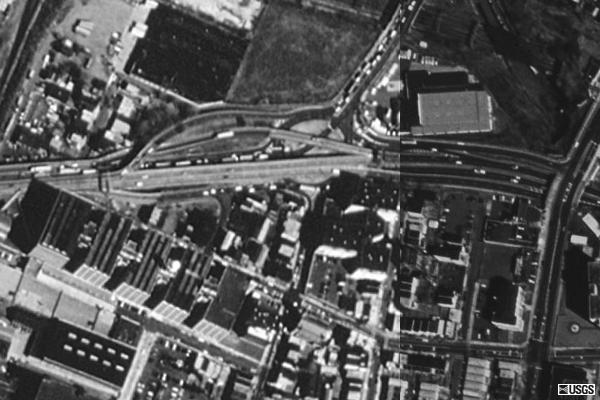
- Aerial view of the warehouse district in the Marion Section of Jersey City, between the PATH train tracks and the Pulaski Skyway

- Marion in Hudson County in New Jersey
- Coordinates: 40°44′07″N 74°04′27″W
- Country: United States
- State: New Jersey
- County: Hudson
- City: Jersey City
- Elevation: 26 ft (7.9 m)
- Area code: 201
- GNIS feature ID: 878120

Marion is a section of Jersey City in Hudson County, in the U.S. state of New Jersey.

== History ==
The Marion Section was laid out in the 1870s and was developed in the early 20th century. The name is speculated to have come from either the old Marion Hotel or the founders of a watch company located near the city line. Marion Junction, an important rail junction in the 19th century is nearby. Originally concentrated with families of Italian ancestry, Marion was planned as a blue-collar residential community to work at Lorillard Tobacco Company, American Can Company, or nearby railroad yards.

== Description ==
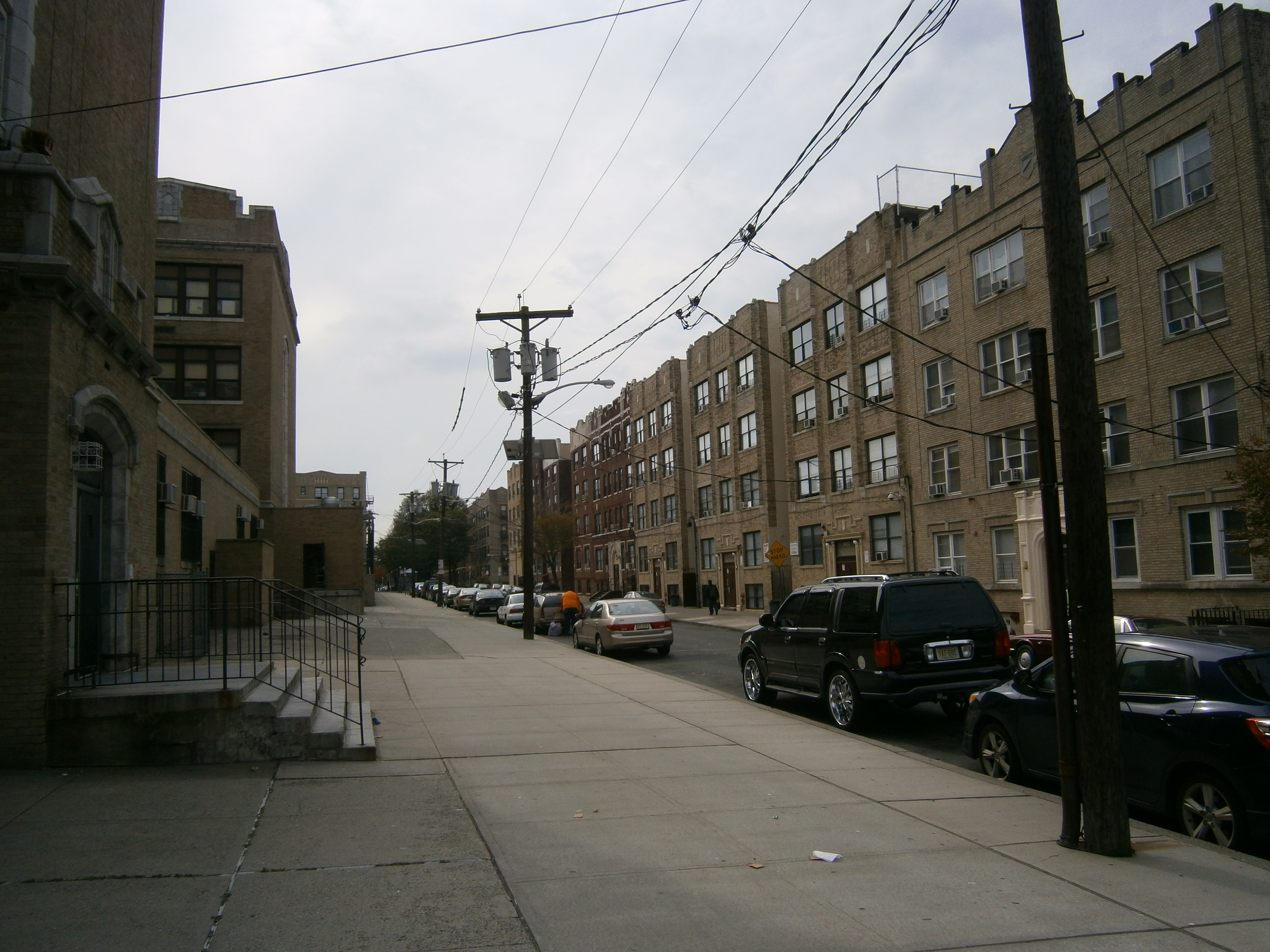
Sidestreet off Broadway

To the west of Journal Square and north of Holy Name Cemetery on the West Side, the Marion's two distinct neighborhoods are separated by PATH train tracks. It borders other districts of Riverbend, Croxton and the West Side, and is sometimes considered to include the area along the Hackensack Riverfront, Tonnelle Circle, and neighborhood overlapping India Square. Marion is mostly a low-rise residential district that is home to several new housing developments, light manufacturing, restaurants, LaPointe Park and the Marion Branch Public Library. Broadway, U.S. Route 1/9, Sip Avenue and West Side Avenue are the main streets running through the neighborhood. The 1940 Marion Gardens housing project creates the western residential border for the section.

The area north of the tracks near the foot of on Newark Avenue and east of Marion Junction is surrounded by manufacturing and warehouse buildings, a few of which have received New Jersey Register of Historic Places designation. Some have been converted to residences or other uses, notably that of the American Can Company. The Middle East Center for the Arts (MECA) is an exhibition space at Mana Contemporary also housed in a former manufacturing building and that is an extension of the fine arts transportation department of Moishe's Moving Systems. The 1,000,000 (one million)-square foot building is also home to dance companies of Shen Wei and Karole Armitage.

Skyway Park has received funding and eventually will connect to the Hackensack RiverWalk with a 1,300-foot (400 m) extension to Lincoln Park and the East Coast Greenway. The reclaimed brownfield will be transformed to a 32-acre waterfront park including two soccer fields, a drill/practice area, a lawn/fairgrounds, and a mile long jogging/walking path. Portions were once part of the PJP Landfill.

India Square is a neighborhood in the Journal Square and Marion neighborhoods. It is home to one of the highest concentrations of Asian Indians in the Western Hemisphere and one of at least 24 enclaves characterized as a Little India which have emerged within the New York City Metropolitan Area. Little Bombay is centered by India Square, a two-block stretch of Newark Avenue home to over 13,000 people of Indian origin. As of the 2010 Census, the area had a population of over 27,000, with the majority being of Indian descent. As of the 2010 census, over 27,000 Asian Indians accounted for 10.9% of Jersey City's population.

== Potential PATH station ==
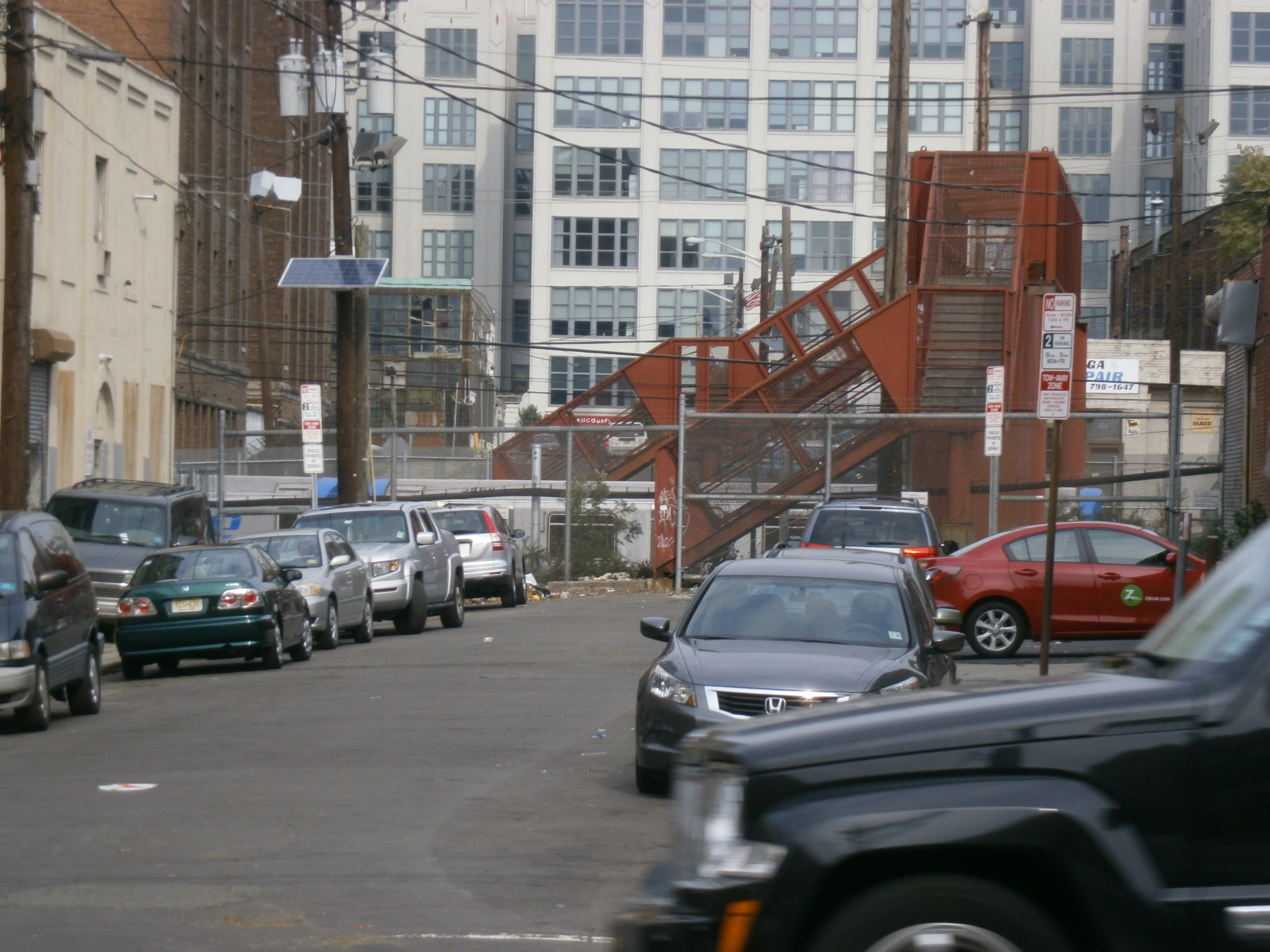
The neighborhood separated by PATH tracks crossed by a pedestrian bridge

Although the PATH train runs through the district, there is no station there. During his terms as Mayor of Jersey City in the 1980s and 1990s, Gerald McCann called for a new station. Another former mayor, Jerramiah Healy also requested that a PATH stop be built at Broadway and West Side Avenue, augmenting service at the nearest station at Journal Square. There are a growing number housing units being built in the Marion Section and government officials find a stop on the PATH system will be necessary to unclog the city streets and lessen the commute for residents and to bolster development in the neighborhood, which has fewer cultural attractions than others in the city. The city entered into an agreement in 2018 that the agency would conduct a feasibility study. After some delays, the report was completed in 2020.

== See also ==
- Ethnic enclave
- Hackensack Riverfront
- Hackensack RiverWalk
- Hudson Generating Station
- Holy Name Cemetery, Jersey City
- Pulaski Skyway
- Tonnele Circle
- Riverbend
