= Yards Creek Generating Station =

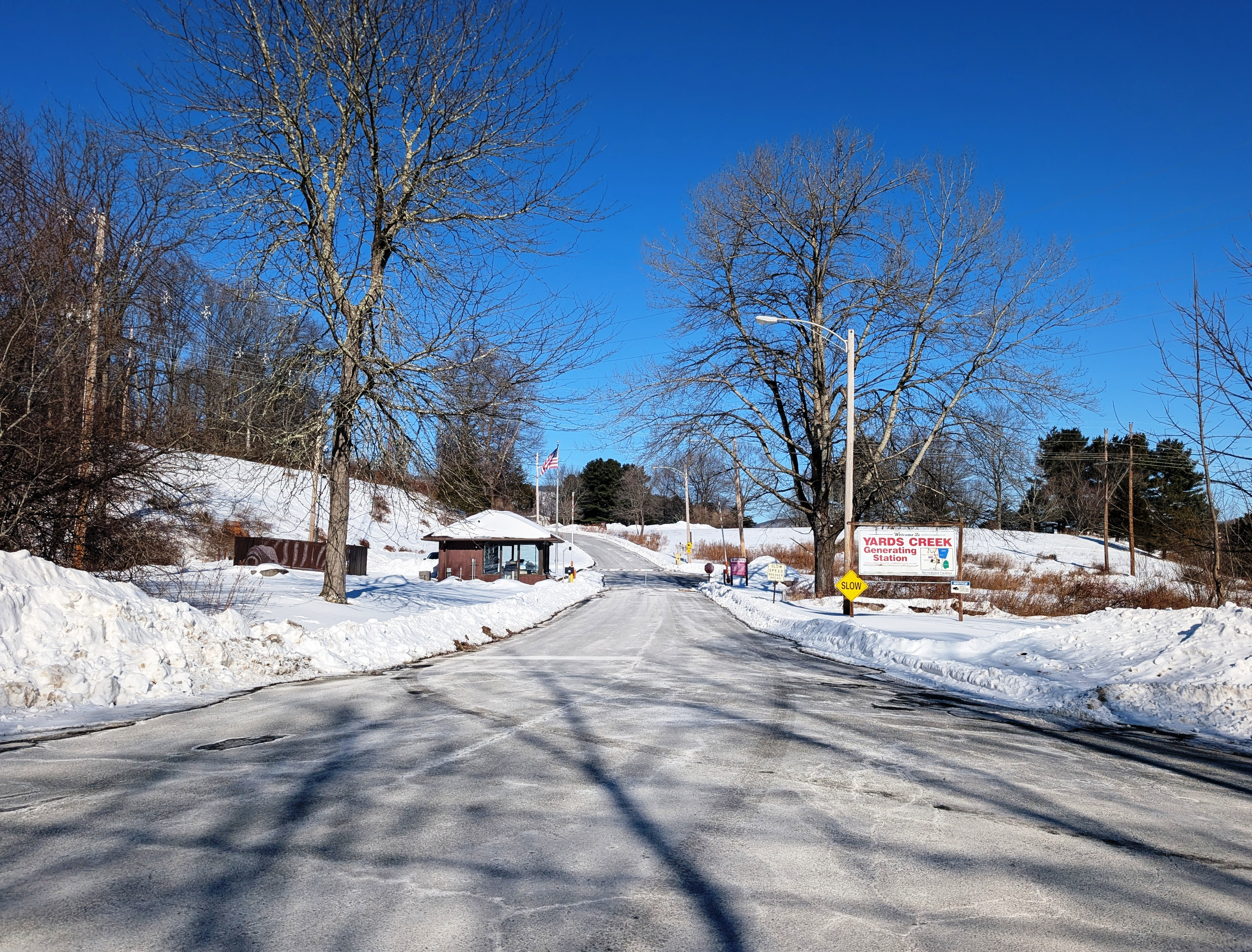
- Entrance to the plant
- Interactive map of Yards Creek Generating Station
- Country: United States
- Location: Blairstown, New Jersey
- Coordinates: 41°0′2.96″N 75°1′53.60″W
- Status: Operational
- Owner: REV Renewables

Upper reservoir
- Creates: Upper Yards Creek Reservoir
- Total capacity: 5,013 acre⋅ft (6,183,000 m^{3})

Lower reservoir
- Creates: Lower Yards Creek Reservoir
- Total capacity: 5,452 acre⋅ft (6,725,000 m^{3})

Power Station
- Pump-generators: 3 x 140 MW reversible Francis-type
- Installed capacity: 420 MW
- Annual generation: 753.7 GWh

Yards Creek Generating Station is a pumped-storage hydroelectric plant in Blairstown and Hardwick Township in Warren County, New Jersey, United States. The facility is owned by REV Renewables, which purchased it from Public Service Enterprise Group and FirstEnergy in 2020 and 2021. It has an installed capacity of 420 MW.

== Location ==
The facility is located in the Delaware Water Gap region of the New Jersey Skylands. When built, the complex stretched into the former Pahaquarry Township. Pahaquarry got its name from the word Pahaquarra, which was a derivation of the Native American word Pahaqualong, which meant "the place between the mountains beside the waters". The township dissolved in 1997, becoming part of Hardwick Township

== Operations ==
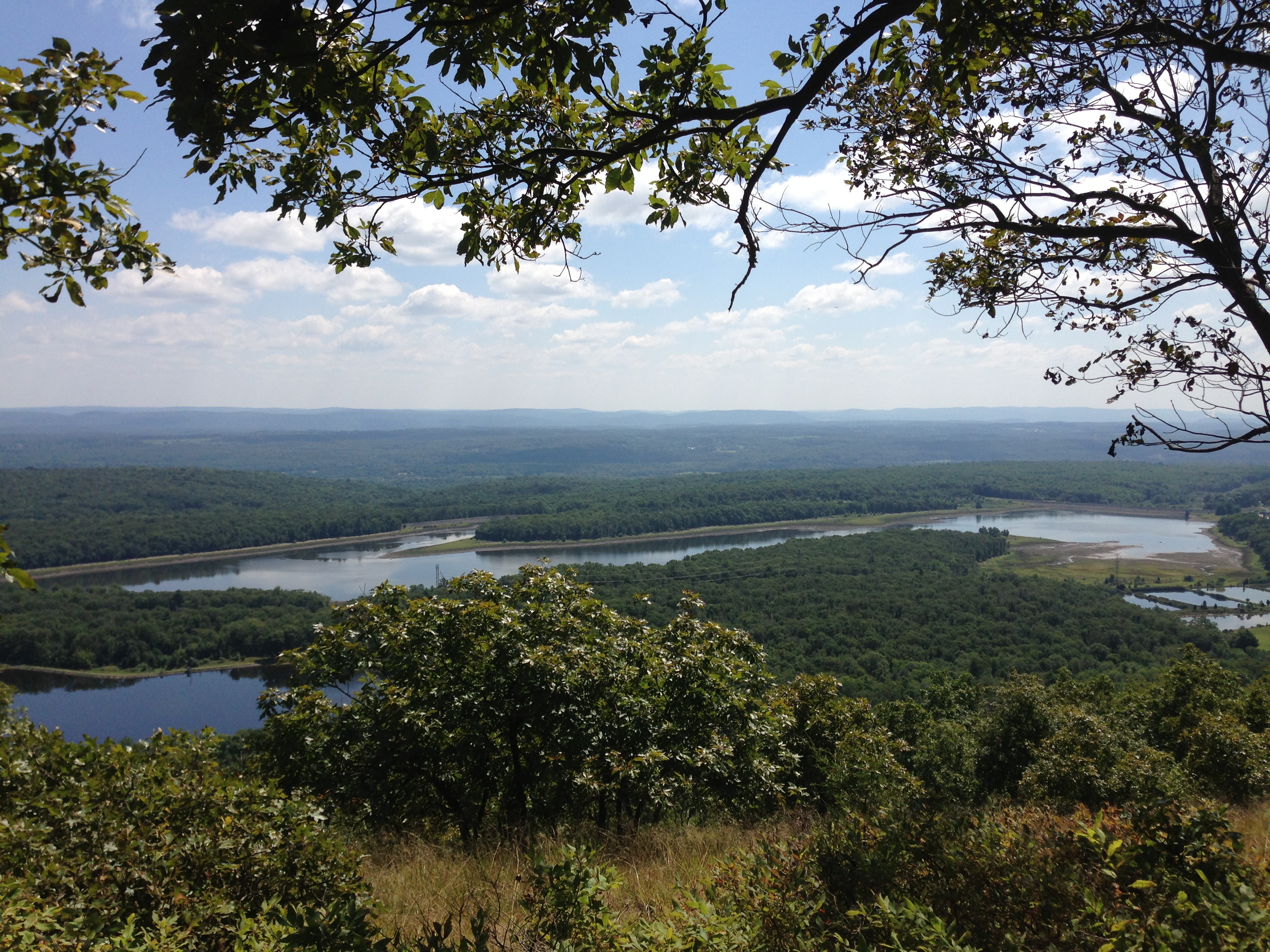
Lower Yards Creek Reservoir as seen from the Appalachian Trail

Commercial operation began in 1965 and the power station was upgraded in the 1990s. Yards Creek consists of two reservoirs created by earth-fill embankment dams. The upper and lower reservoirs are separated by an elevation of 700 ft (210 m). Water is conveyed between the plant and the Upper Reservoir via an 18-foot (5.5 m) diameter, 1,800-foot (550 m) long exposed steel pipe. At full station load, approximately 4 million gpm of water is released (9000 cfs) 5,800 MGD, Velocity: 35 ft/sec, or 24 miles per hour (39 km/h). The full upper reservoir will last 5.7 hours at Hydraulic Turbine nameplate capacity. The storage facility provides energy regulation and spinning reserve during on-peak hours, and it provides an energy sink off-peak (from 11 P.M. to 7 A.M.) to allow fossil and nuclear plants to remain more fully loaded.

== See also ==
- List of power stations in New Jersey
