= Pilesgrove Solar Farm =

- Country: United States
- Location: Pilesgrove Township, New Jersey
- Coordinates: 39.61380°N 75.30868°W
- Status: Operational
- Construction began: 2010
- Commission date: 2011
- Owners: Panda Power Funds; Con Edison

Solar farm
- Type: Flat-panel PV
- Site area: 100 acres (40.5 ha)

Power generation
- Units operational: 71,000
- Nameplate capacity: 20 MW

The Pilesgrove Solar Farm is a 20-megawatt (MW, 26,800 hp) solar photovoltaic power plant, located in Pilesgrove Township, New Jersey, United States. The farm contains 71,000 ground-mounted solar panels and at the time of its construction was one of the largest solar farms in the northeast United States.

The solar farm was developed by Dallas-based Panda Power Funds and Valhalla, New York-based Con Edison Development. In addition to the sale of electrical power, the companies are expected to generate an additional $11 million to $12 million per year in renewable energy certificates.

== See also ==
- Solar power in New Jersey
- List of power stations in New Jersey
