= Newark Energy Center =

Gas-fired powerplant in Newark, New Jersey, United States

- Country: United States
- Location: Newark, New Jersey
- Coordinates: 40°42′26″N 74°07′40″W
- Status: In Operation
- Commission date: 2011
- Owner: Energy Investors Fund

Thermal power station
- Primary fuel: Gas
- Turbine technology: Combustion Turbine
- Cooling source: Passaic Valley Sewerage Commission

Power generation
- Nameplate capacity: 655 MW

The Newark Energy Center is a 655-megawatt gas fired power plant in Newark, New Jersey. Approved in 2011, with construction beginning in 2012 it began commercial operations in May 2015. It is situated on a 23 acres (9.3 ha) brownfield east of Doremus Avenue next to a Hess oil terminal on the Passaic River. It was originally built as a joint venture between Hess Corporation and Energy Investors Fund, and it was taken over the latter in 2014.

The facility comprises two General Electric (GE) 07FA.05 combined cycle combustion turbine generators (CTGs), two heat recovery steam generators (HRSG) each equipped with duct burners, one steam turbine generator (STG), one 12-cell wet mechanical draft cooling tower, and ancillary equipment. The facility will use waste water from the Passaic Valley Sewerage Commission, eliminating the need to use fresh water. NAES Corporation provides operations and maintenance; Direct Energy handles energy management services. The plant consists of 23 full-time staff members. It will sell its energy and capacity into the PJM Interconnection capacity market regional grid.

== See also ==
- List of power stations in New Jersey
- Essex County Resource Recovery Facility
- Bayonne Energy Center
