= Tinton Falls Solar Farm =

Solar photovoltaic power plant in Tinton Falls, New Jersey

- Country: United States
- Location: Tinton Falls, New Jersey
- Coordinates: 40.2662273°N 74.0830820°W
- Status: Operational
- Construction began: 2011
- Commission date: October 2012
- Construction cost: US$80 million
- Operator: Zongyi Solar Energy (America)

Solar farm
- Type: Flat-panel PV
- Site area: 100 acres (40.5 ha)

Power generation
- Units operational: 85,000
- Nameplate capacity: 19.8 MW

The Tinton Falls Solar Farm is a 20-megawatt solar photovoltaic power plant located in Tinton Falls, New Jersey. The farm contains 85,000 ground-mounted solar panels, and at the time of its construction, it was one of the largest solar farms in the northeast United States.

The solar farm was developed by Rager Energy LLC and was acquired in 2011 as a fully approved project by Jiangsu Zongyi (a Chinese company) under a subsidiary named Zongyi Solar Energy (America). The purchase price of the raw land was reported to be $5.5 million US dollars (2012).

The solar farm began operations in October 2012.

== See also ==
- Solar power in New Jersey
- List of power stations in New Jersey
