= Croxton, Jersey City =

Populated place in Hudson County, New Jersey, US

Croxton
- Unincorporated community
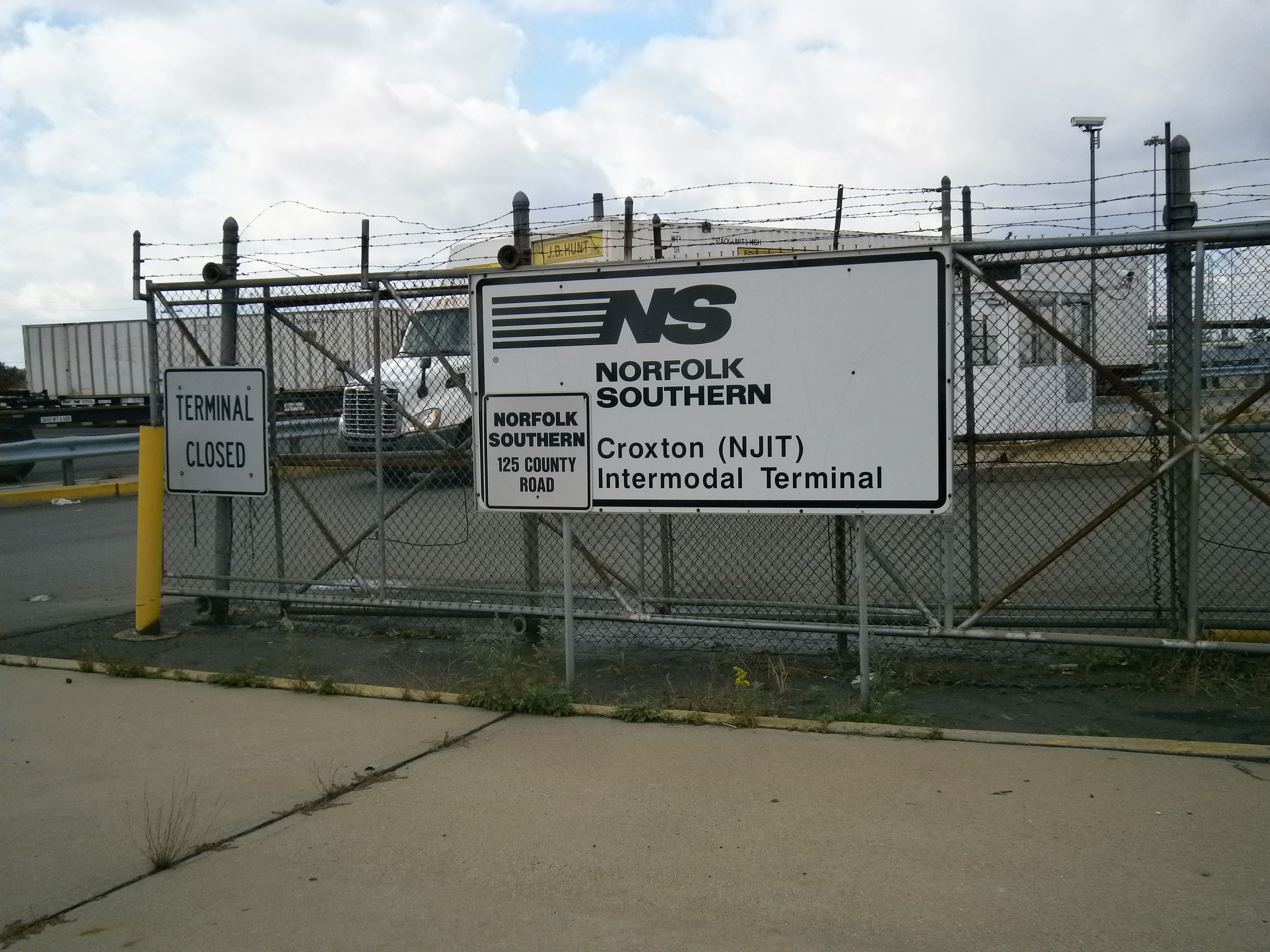
- Truck and auto entrance to Croxton Yard on County Road in Jersey City

- Croxton in Hudson County in New Jersey
- Coordinates: 40°44′23″N 74°03′47″W
- Country: United States
- State: New Jersey
- County: Hudson
- City: Jersey City
- Postal code: 07305
- Area code: 201
- GNIS feature ID: 882889

Croxton is a section of Jersey City in the New Jersey Meadowlands in Hudson County, in the U.S. state of New Jersey.

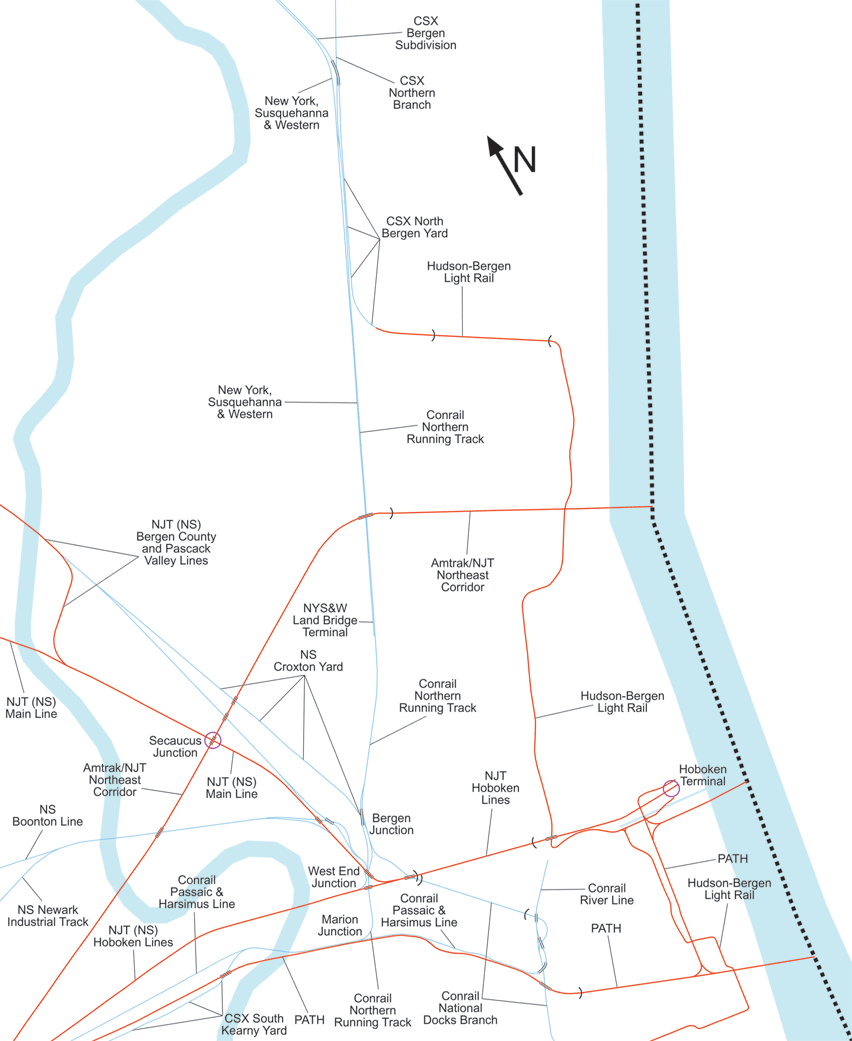
Croxton lies west of the Marion Running Track.

It is bounded by Secaucus at Penhorn Creek. The Riverbend of the Hackensack River and the Hudson Generating Station and the Marion Section lie to the south and Truck 1-9 and Western Slope to the east. Nearby North Bergen Yard and Croxton Yard are parts of the North Jersey Shared Assets Area. The Yard is officially known as the North Jersey Intermodal Terminal.

The area is informally named Croxton after Croxton Yard on the Norfolk Southern Freight Line. Much of the area is filled with New Jersey Transit commuter lines and freight lines. There are no passenger stations, although Secaucus Junction is nearby. The area is home to the Metropolitan Bulk Mail Facility for New York and New Jersey. The only major road crossing the district is County Road, which connects Jersey City Heights with Secaucus. In 2005, the New Jersey Turnpike opened Exit 15X to allow access to the newly built Secaucus Junction train station, the access road to which acts like a huge U-turn, and dominates the landscape.

The name Croxton was given to the railroad yard after Philip Croxton, the traffic manager for Lorillard Tobacco Company, which opened a factory at 888 Newark Avenue in the nearby Marion Section during his tenure.

New Jersey Transit bus route #2 travels along County Avenue from Secaucus Junction to Journal Square.

== Gallery ==
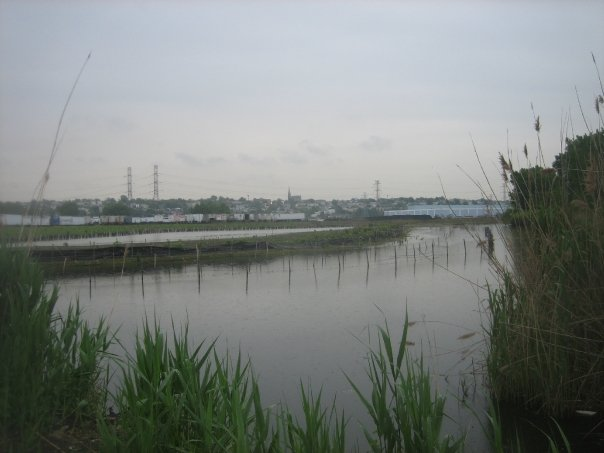
Croxton across Penhorn Creek

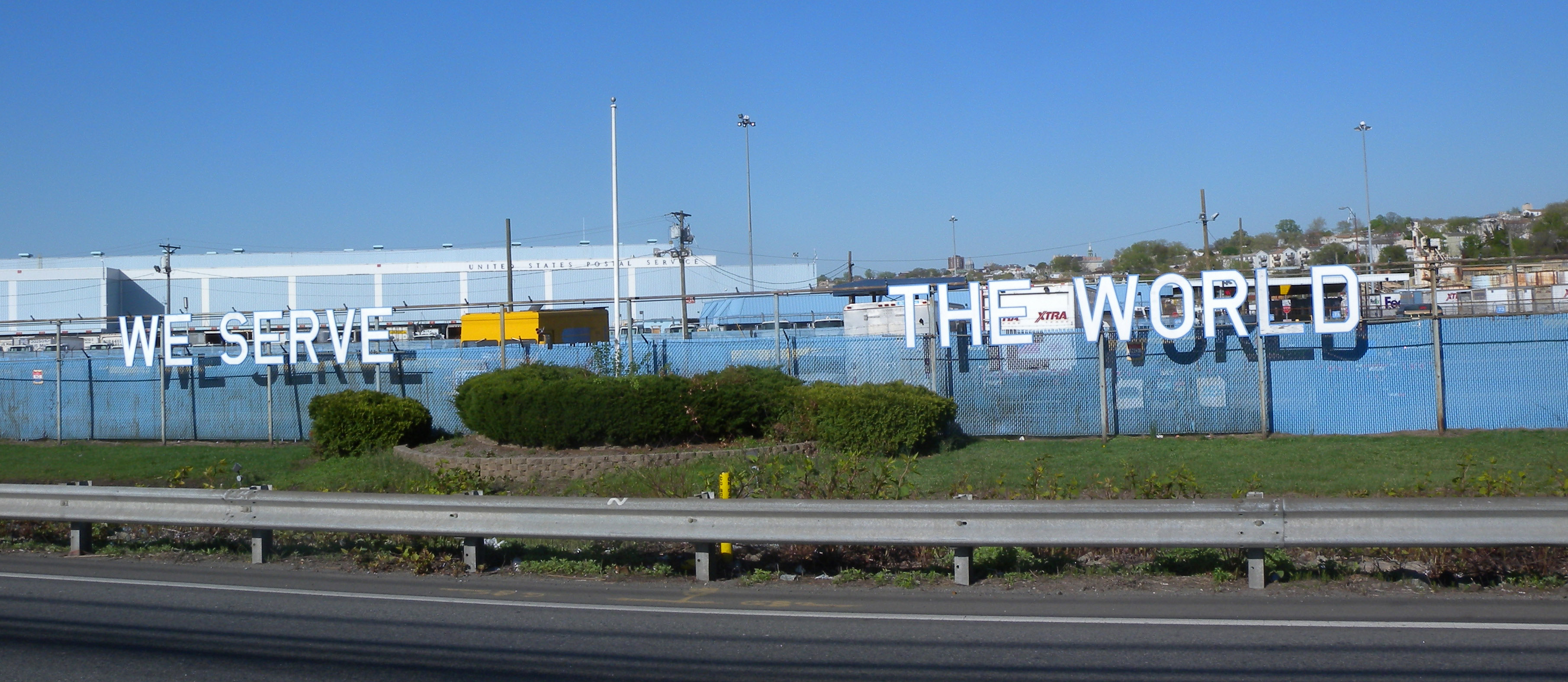
Metropolitan Bulk Mail Facility

== See also ==
- Crescent Corridor
- List of rail yards
- New Jersey Meadowlands Commission
- Hudson Generating Station
- List of neighborhoods in Jersey City, New Jersey
- Tonnele Circle
- Marion Junction
- Northeast Corridor
- Pulaski Skyway
- U.S. Route 1/9
- Wittpenn Bridge
- Main Line
- Bergen County Line
- Pascack Valley Line
- Passaic and Harsimus Line
- West Hudson
- Wittpenn Bridge
