= Hudson Generating Station =

Power plant in Jersey City, New Jersey, United States

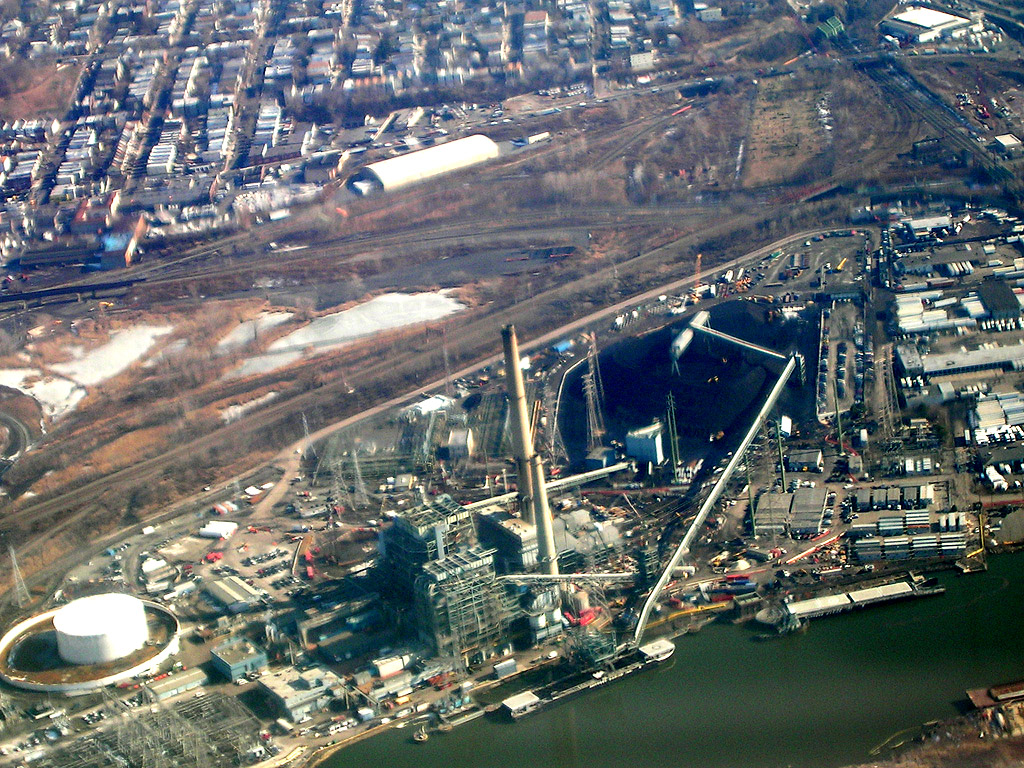
- Aerial view of the Hudson Generating Station with coal-delivery barges in the foreground
- Country: United States
- Location: Jersey City, New Jersey
- Coordinates: 40°44′50″N 74°04′21″W
- Status: Decommissioned
- Commission date: Unit 1: 12/10/1964; Unit 2: 12/18/1968; Unit 3: 12/01/1967
- Decommission date: Unit 1:12/08/2011; Unit 3: 10/17/2003
- Owner: PSEG Fossil LLC

Thermal power station
- Primary fuel: Low-sulphur bituminous coal from West Virginia
- Secondary fuel: Natural gas
- Turbine technology: Steam turbine
- Cooling source: Hackensack River

Power generation
- Nameplate capacity: 660 MW

Hudson Generating Station was a power plant operated by PSEG Fossil LLC, a subsidiary of Public Service Enterprise Group (PSEG). It was located in Jersey City in Hudson County, New Jersey, United States. The site was in operation from 1906 to 2017, but as of 2011 only one unit was in operation at the facility – Unit 2, which ran primarily on coal to generate electricity and was also capable of burning natural gas as a secondary fuel. Unit 2 was also equipped with several back-end technology emission controls. The generating station was closed permanently by PSEG Power on June 1, 2017. The 241-acre site was sold to Chicago-based Hilco Redevelopment Partners in January 2019, which plans to repurpose the site as a state-of-the-art industrial park serving growing warehouse-distribution business in region.

== Location ==
The Hudson Generating Station occupied a nearly 250-acre (100 ha) site north of the intersection of Duffield and Van Keuren Avenues. Located on the east bank of the Hackensack River near the Riverbend, three miles (5 km) upstream from Newark Bay, it created the perimeter of Croxton and the Marion Section, and borders Secaucus at Penhorn Creek.

== History ==
The Hudson Generating Station was built on the site of the former Marion Generating Station, the first PSEG plant, which started operation in 1906. The Marion Station was the largest in the PSEG fleet until 1924. The bulk of the Marion station was retired in 1961, as construction on the Hudson Station began. Unit 1 was installed in 1964 and retired in 2011. Unit 2 was installed in 1968 and acted as a load following unit. Unit 3, a gas-burning turbine, was installed in 1967 and shut down in 2003.

When the station was retired in 2017, the company stated the decision was mostly because of tougher environmental regulations and a move toward natural gas.

The 500 feet tall smokestack was demolished on March 21, 2020. Four months later, the main structure of the plant was demolished via controlled implosion on July 24, 2020.

== Fuel supply ==
Unit 2 typically burned a low-sulphur coal from West Virginia. In May 1996, a test on that coal indicated a 0.056 ppm (by weight) mercury content.

- Water usage: There were no cooling towers at the PSE&G Hudson plant; the Hackensack River water was utilized for the plant's Rankine cycle condenser cooling.
- The Unused Coal, a special rank, and grade, from Indonesia was shipped overseas (Fall 2017)...

== Historic emissions ==
Annual NOx, SO2 and CO2 emissions
| Year | NO_{x} (short tons) | SO_{2} (short tons) | CO_{2} (short tons) |
|---|---|---|---|
| 2009 | 1,889.2 | 1,455.7 | 1,870,629.5 |
| 2010 | 2,206.7 | 1,727.5 | 2,387,413.6 |
| 2011 | 768.7 | 987.3 | 1,967,294.7 |
| 2012 | 372.8 | 138.9 | 663,637.3 |
| 2013 | 478.2 | 133.2 | 771,667.4 |

== Habitats and environment ==
=== Ospreys ===
In 1997, officials from PSEG Fossil observed that ospreys were unsuccessfully attempting to build nests on a transmission tower at the Hudson Generating Station. To support the birds, Public Service Electric and Gas Company installed a nesting platform on a utility pole at the station in 1998. The platform was constructed by students from the Hudson Liberty Council's Boy Scouts of America and the Urban League of Hudson County's youth build program. On July 13, 2007, the first osprey chick to hatch in the New Jersey Meadowlands since the early 20th century flew from its nest at the Hudson Generating Station.

=== NJDEP Environmental Stewardship Program ===
By 2010, the station achieved recognition by the New Jersey Department of Environmental Protection Compliance & Enforcement division in 10 of a possible 21 Environmental Stewardship categories.

== Conflicts and controversies ==
=== Clean Air Act settlement and installation of back-end technology ===
After being accused of violating Clean Air Act New Source Review standards in 2000, PSEG settled with federal regulators and entered into a consent decree in 2002, which mandated the installation of emission controls at Hudson. In 2010, the facility completed installation of back-end technology to control emissions at the station: selective catalytic reduction to control nitrogen oxides, dry scrubbers to control sulfur dioxide, activated carbon injection to control mercury, and a pulse jet fabric filter system to control particulate emissions. Despite the US$700 million investment in improvements in the facility some activists still considered it a detriment to the community.
