= UDP-2,4-diacetamido-2,4,6-trideoxy-beta-L-altropyranose hydrolase =

Identifiers
- EC no.: 3.6.1.57

Databases
- IntEnz: IntEnz view
- BRENDA: BRENDA entry
- ExPASy: NiceZyme view
- KEGG: KEGG entry
- MetaCyc: metabolic pathway
- PRIAM: profile
- PDB structures: RCSB PDB PDBe PDBsum
Search
- PMC: articles
- PubMed: articles
- NCBI: proteins

UDP-2,4-diacetamido-2,4,6-trideoxy-beta-L-altropyranose hydrolase (EC 3.6.1.57, PseG, UDP-6-deoxy-AltdiNAc hydrolase, Cj1312) is an enzyme with systematic name UDP-2,4-bis(acetamido)-2,4,6-trideoxy-beta-L-altropyranose hydrolase. This enzyme catalyses the following chemical reaction

UDP-2,4-bis(acetamido)-2,4,6-trideoxy-beta-L-altropyranose + H_{2}O $\rightleftharpoons$ 2,4-bis(acetamido)-2,4,6-trideoxy-beta-L-altropyranose + UDP

The enzyme is involved in biosynthesis of pseudaminic acid.
