= Essex County Resource Recovery Facility =

Waste power station in Essex County, New Jersey

Covanta Essex
- Country: United States
- Location: Newark, New Jersey
- Coordinates: 40°44′18″N 74°07′35″W
- Status: Operational
- Commission date: 1990
- Owner: Port Authority of New York and New Jersey
- Operator: Reworld

Thermal power station
- Primary fuel: Municipal waste
- Turbine technology: Incineration

Power generation
- Nameplate capacity

The Essex County Resource Recovery Facility, also known as Covanta Essex, is a waste-to-energy incineration power station in Essex County, New Jersey, United States. Opened in 1990, it is owned by the Port Authority of New York and New Jersey (PANYNJ) and operated by Reworld. It is located adjacent to the New Jersey Turnpike between Raymond Boulevard and the Passaic River in Newark.

As of 2012, the facility processed 2,800 tons of municipal solid waste per day, its two generators producing approximately 65 megawatts of power. The facility burns garbage from the 22 municipalities of Essex County and from New York City's Manhattan Community Board Districts 1, 2, 3, 4, 7, 9, 10, 11, 12.

As of January 1, 2013 the PANYNJ gave Covanta control of the facility through 2032, with optional extension to 2052. As part of the agreement the New York City Department of Sanitation will continue to use about 50% of the plant's disposal capacity. Covanta agreed to invest $75 to $100 million for operational improvements, including a modern particulate emissions control system and a new recycling system for ferrous and non-ferrous metals.

In June 2013, a refueling station for trucks using compressed natural gas (CNG) opened at the facility.

== Environmental justice ==
The facility has been a point of contention with residents of Newark, notably the Ironbound. A local community organizing and advocacy organization, the Ironbound Community Corporation (ICC), was concerned about air pollution emitted by the nearby garbage incinerator facility. Bright pink and purple fumes were often seen spewing from the facility but Covanta blamed a local hospital for improperly disposed medical waste. In summer 2019, ICC partnered with Earthjustice, a nonprofit public interest organization that litigates to protect the environment, and the Environmental Advocacy Clinic at Vermont Law School to take on Covanta by urging state officials to investigate. Covanta has been found many hundreds of times to exceed air pollution limits or to fail to abide by required safety regulations. Covanta eventually acknowledged that the fumes were produced by its burning of pesticides improperly disposed and agreed to new waste management procedures.

== See also ==
- List of power stations in New Jersey
- Newark Energy Center
- Essex Generating Station
