= Riverbend (Hudson County) =

Populated places in Hudson County, New Jersey, US

Riverbend is the name of two sections of Hudson County, New Jersey.

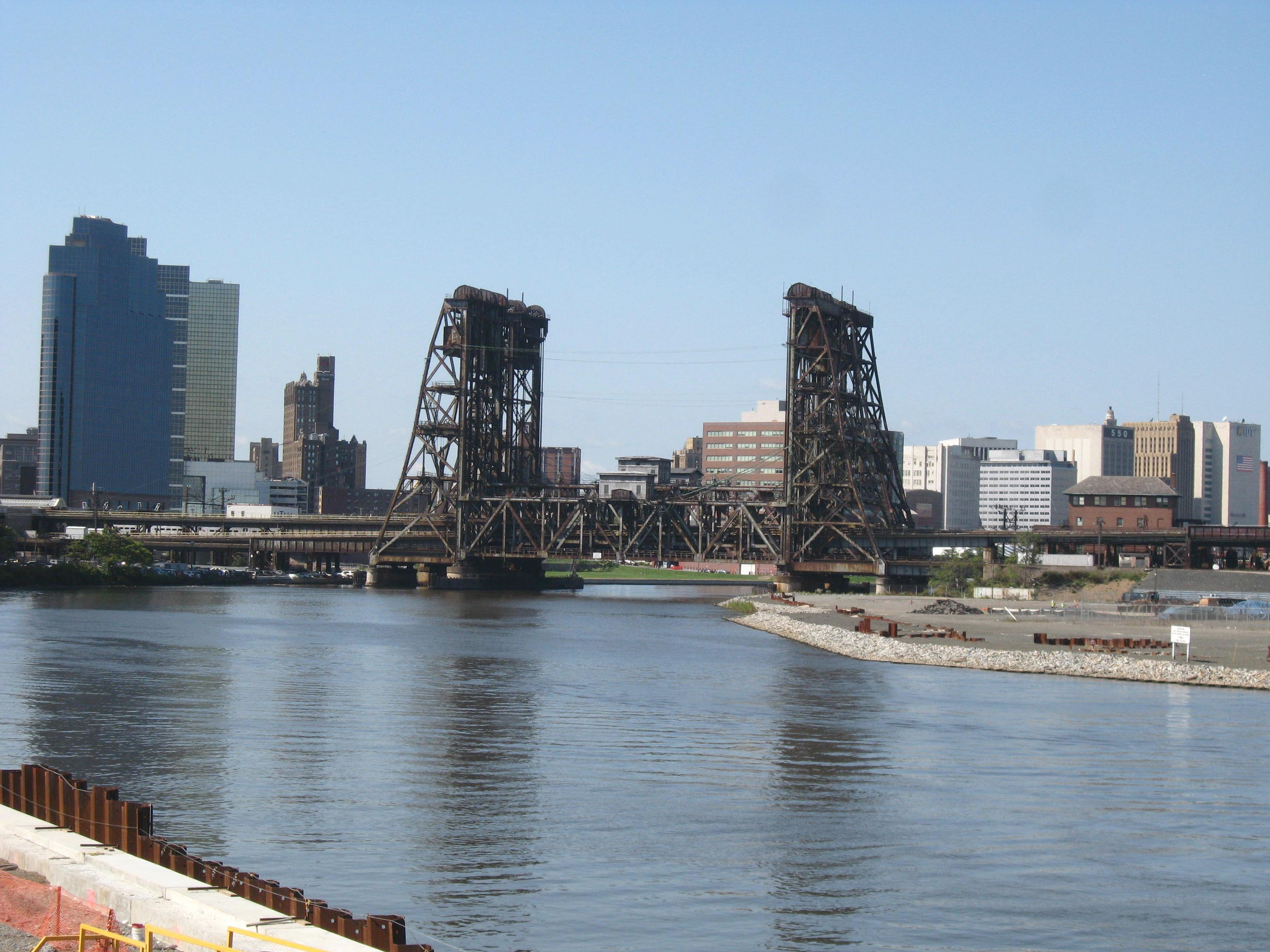
Passaic River

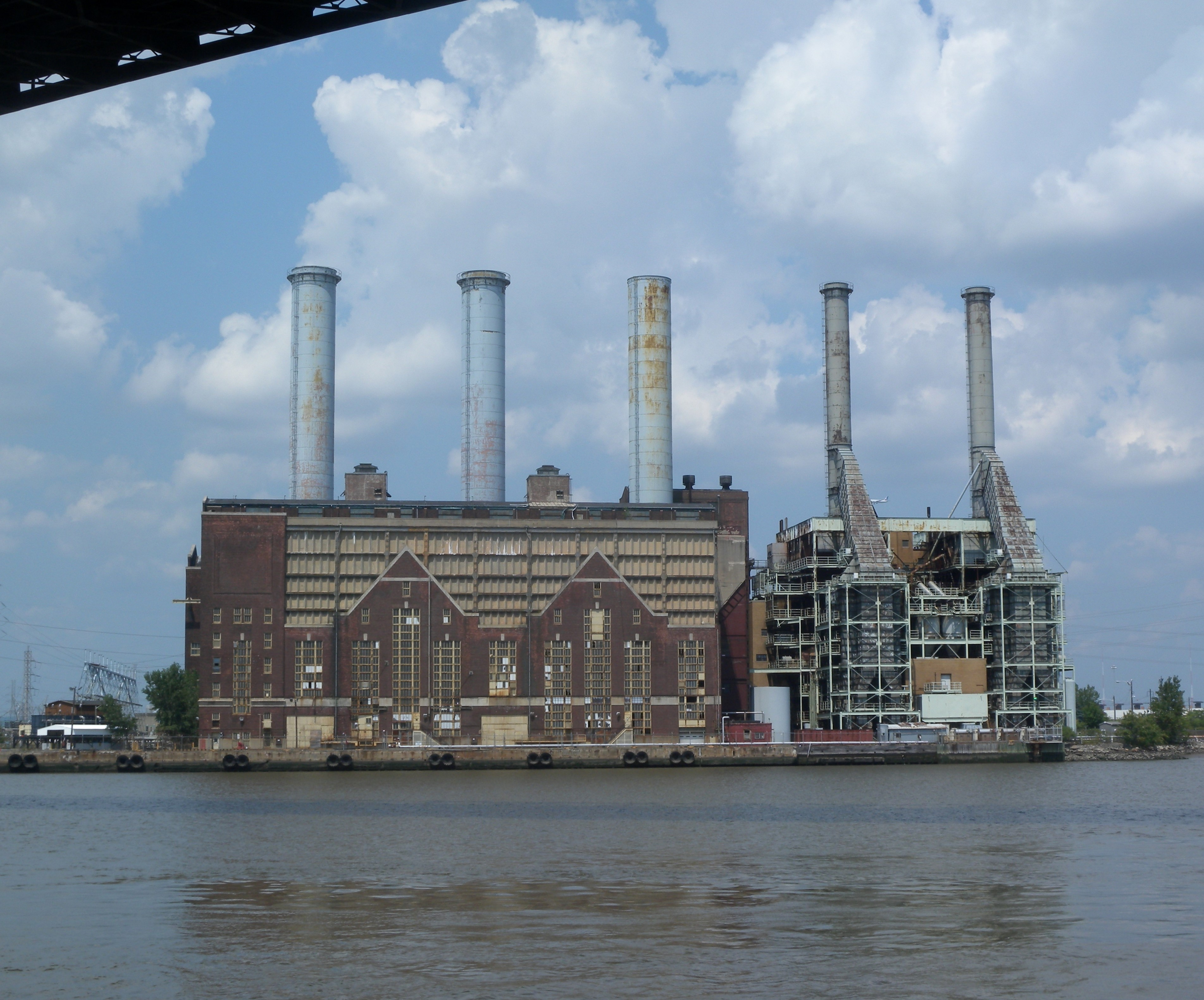
Kearny Generating Station peak turbine plant near the Hackensack Riverbend on the Kearny side of the Hackensack River

The smaller Riverbend District (40°44′12″N 74°09′27″W) is located in Harrison at a bend in the Passaic River in West Hudson across from Newark Penn Station and is the site of Sports Illustrated Stadium. Since the millennium, the southernmost portion of Harrison has seen a major increase in development and population and has gone from being an industrial district on the outskirts of Newark to a transit-oriented residential and commercial neighborhood south west of the PATH Newark Line.

The larger Riverbend Section (40°44′17″N 74°06′26″W) is on the banks of the Hackensack River and is part of the New Jersey Meadowlands District. As its name suggests it lies at a meander (in this case a "S' curve) in the Hackensack River between the New Jersey Turnpike Eastern Spur and where the Belleville Turnpike and the Newark-Jersey City Turnpike converge to cross the Wittpenn Bridge. In the river not far from the mouth of the tributary Penhorn Creek is the point where the municipal borders of Jersey City, Secaucus, and Kearny meet.

This Riverbend is in many ways typical of the New Jersey Meadowlands, a combination of marshes, industry, and rail infrastructure (namely the Northeast Corridor Line as it approaches Secaucus Junction). The northern boundary is the unused rail right-of-way for the former Boonton Line. To the northwest are Snake Hill, site of Hudson County Laurel Hill Park, Anderson Marsh, and Harmon Cove.

The central part of the area is the Riverbend Wetlands Preserve, one of several wetland preservation and restoration areas under the jurisdiction on the New Jersey Meadowlands Commission. Currently the area has limited public access, but may eventually connect with trails to the park and the Secaucus Greenway portion of the Hackensack River Greenway. and the Essex–Hudson Greenway.

To the southeast are the Croxton Yard, and the Hudson Generating Station, the PATH Newark Line, and New Jersey Transit Hoboken Terminal-bound trains. The Kearny Meadows border the river to the southwest.
