= Combe Fill South Superfund Site =

Superfund site on the border of Chester Township and Washington Township, New Jersey

Coordinates: 40.7711°N 74.7409°W

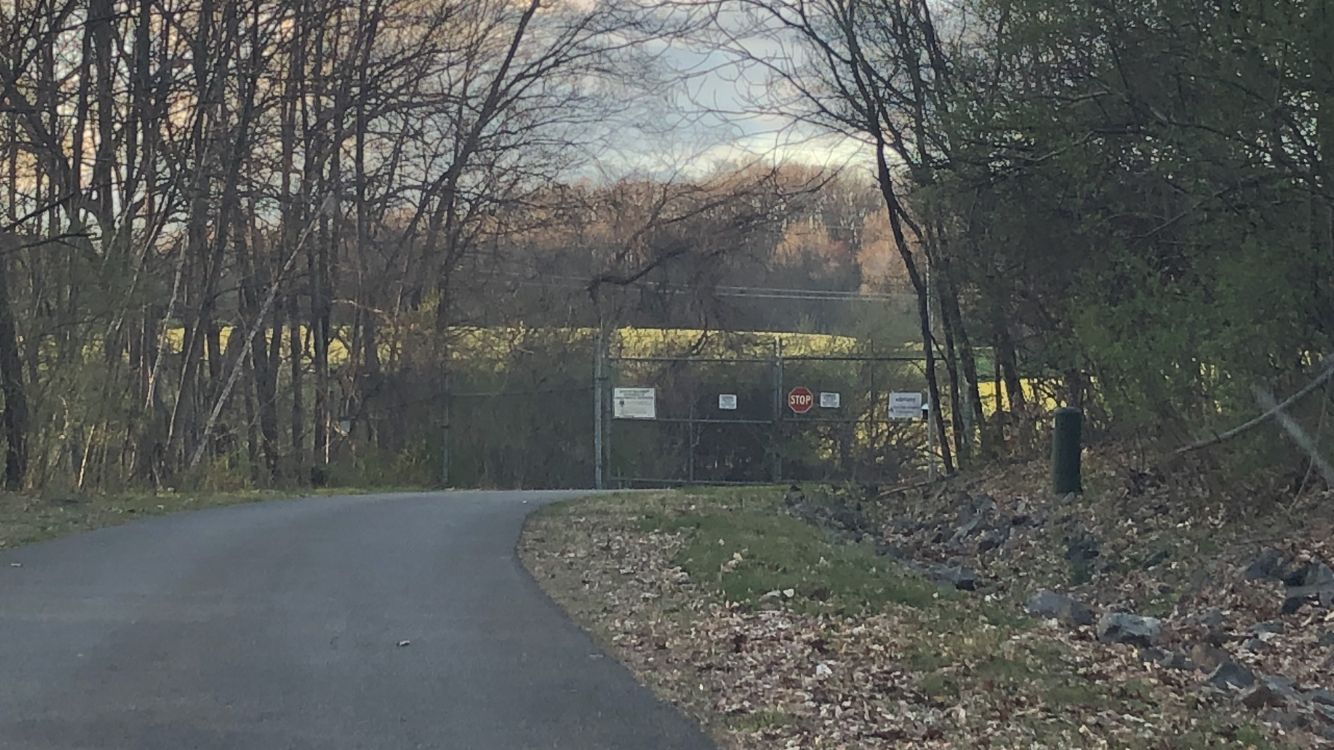
Gate prohibiting entry to the Combe Superfund Site

The Combe Fill South Landfill is located on the border of Chester and Washington townships, both of which are in Morris County, in the state of New Jersey. The Landfill was put on the National Priority List by the EPA (Environmental Protection Agency) in September 1983 due to the site being tested for potentially dangerous chemicals, such as benzene, methylene chloride, and chloroform. Despite attempts to clean up, the site has remained an active Superfund as of September 25, 2017.

== Origin ==
Combe Fill South is located around 2 miles (3.2 km) from the Borough of Chester, and is both part of Chester and Washington townships in Morris County. The area around this 80-acre (32 ha) landfill does not have a very high population density. The original company that owned Combe South Fill is Filiberto Sanitation Incorporated.

The townships of Chester and Washington both relied on the Combe Fill South landfill for over 40 years. However, in the early 1980s it was found out that Combe Fill South had been polluting the groundwater for a very long time.

=== Company origins ===
In the 1940s, the site was used as a place for smaller waste-collecting vehicles to transfer their waste to the larger waste collecting vehicles, and was owned by the Filiberto family. The site was then converted into a landfill, which was operated by Filiberto Sanitation Incorporated in 1970 and 1971. However, due to a fish kill in the nearby Trout Brook, the New Jersey Department of Environmental Protection gave the rights of operation of a sanitary landfill to Chester Hills Incorporated. In 1978, operation of the landfill changed again, this time from Chester Hills Incorporated to the Combe Fill Corporation. And in 1981, Combe Fill Corporation declared bankruptcy and ceased the operation of Combe Fill South. Though not proven, it is thought by many that pressure from environmental activists led to the end of the Combe Fill Corporation.

== Superfund site designation ==
Starting in 1972, once Chester Hill Incorporated started to run the landfill, the New Jersey Department of Environmental Protection's Bureau of Solid Waste started its inspections of the Combe Fill South Landfill. These inspections started because of the recent Fish Kill in Trout Brook, which is not far from Combe Fill South. The inspections continued until 1981, when the inspections turned into an analysis of groundwater and nearby surface water sites. Due to these tests, which had found multiple dangerous chemicals in the groundwater, the United States Environmental Protection Agency made the Combe Fill South landfill an official Superfund Site.

=== State intervention ===
1977, the New Jersey Department of Environmental Protection persuaded Chester Hills Incorporated to install two wells for observation and sampling of groundwater on the site. These wells proved that not only did groundwater contamination exist, but had most likely spread to local water sources. In 1981, samples taken from 90 potable wells were taken, and most contained a list of contaminates including but not limited to benzene, chloroform, methylene chloride, trichloroethylene, as well as other volatile organic compounds.

=== National intervention ===
In cooperation with the NJDEP, the United States Environmental Protection Agency placed Combe Fill South on the National Priority List as a Superfund Site.

== Health and environmental hazard ==
Data collected by the Environmental Protection Agency in 1980 shows that the average amount of dissolved solids in the 5 wells they studied is around 228 per well (Ziegler, 1-4). The wells had multiple violations of the Safe Drinking Water Act, which was made by the Environmental Protection Agency.

=== Chloroform ===
According to the Environmental Protection Agency, chloroform can enter the air from the process of chlorination. Short-term exposure to chloroform can lead to central nervous system depression, while long term exposure can lead to hepatitis, jaundice, and effects on the central nervous system.

== Clean up ==
Initial Cleanup of Combe Fill South began with the construction of a remedy in 1997. Groundwater extraction and treatment started in June of that same year. Since then, the method of air quality treatment changed from an active system to a passive system.

=== Initial cleanup ===
Along with the remedy, the state provided water treatment to residents close to Combe Fill South. This is the beginning of a six part plan to clean up the site, which also includes covering the site with a material such as clay to prevent rain water from coming in contact with the buried waste, treating the groundwater and leachate, and determining if the aquifer nearby needs treatment.

=== Current status ===
The Combe Fill South landfill has been undergoing treatment by the EPA since 1997, but has not yet been taken off the National Priority List. There are currently a study on the deep water aquifer taking place, which will help the EPA determine what the next plan of action is.

A 17.8 MW solar farm was installed on the site in 2025.
