= Passaic Valley Sewerage Commission =

Wastewater public utility in New Jersey, US

The Passaic Valley Sewerage Commission (PVSC) is a regional wastewater public utility located in Newark, New Jersey. Established in 1902, PVSC provides sewage treatment services to over 1.6 million residents in 48 municipalities within Bergen, Essex, Hudson, Union and Passaic Counties. The commission also provides environmental education programs to school districts in its service area. The largest cities in the service area are Newark, Jersey City, Bayonne, Union City, East Orange, Passaic, Paterson, Clifton, and the Township of North Bergen.

The utility's treatment plant began operation in 1924. The plant currently uses activated sludge secondary treatment technology, has a design capacity of 330 million gallons per day (MGD) and discharges to Newark Bay. In addition to processing the biosolids (sludge) from the Newark Bay plant, PVSC also processes liquid wastes (e.g. commercial waste, landfill leachate) and sludge from facilities outside its service area, including the Bergen County Utilities Authority.
