= Tunnel (disambiguation) =

A tunnel is an underground passage such as:

- Bridge–tunnel
- Canal tunnel
- Escape tunnel
- Pedestrian tunnel (disambiguation)
- Secret tunnel
- Shark tunnel
- Smuggling tunnel
- Submerged floating tunnel
- Toll tunnel
- Underwater tunnel

Tunnel or Tunnels may also refer to:

== Film and TV ==
- The Tunnel (1915 film), German silent, based on science fiction novel Der Tunnel by Bernhard Kellermann
- The Tunnel (1933 German-language film), German-French co-production based on Kellermann's novel
- The Tunnel (1933 French-language film), French-German co-production of above
- The Tunnel (1935 film), British version of Kellermann's novel
- The Tunnel (1952 film), Argentine drama film directed by León Klimovsky
- "The Tunnel" (Playhouse 90), 1959 episode of American TV series, depicts Civil War tunnel
- The Tunnel (1962 film), television documentary about construction of escape tunnel from East to West Berlin
- The Tunnel (2001 film), German docudrama dramatizing events in 1962 documentary
- The Tunnel (2009 film), South African short by Jenna Bass
- The Tunnel (2011 film), Australian horror styled as found-footage documentary
- The Tunnel (TV series), 2013 French-British bilingual crime drama based on 2011 Danish-Swedish series Broen (The Bridge)
- Tunnel (2014 film), Nigerian drama about young pastor's life and struggles
- The Tunnel (2014 film), South Korean horror recorded with 3D technology
- Tunnelen, 2016 Norwegian horror / science fiction short film released in English as The Tunnel
- Tunnel (2016 film), South Korean survival drama
- Tunnel (TV series), 2017 South Korean crime / science fiction about police detective in time tunnel
- The Tunnel (2019 film), Norwegian disaster thriller about tunnel fire
- "Tunnels", a season 4 episode of Servant (TV series)

== Geography ==
- Tunnel, former name of Grosmont, North Yorkshire
- Tunnel, Tasmania, locality in Australia
- Tunnel, New York, locality in the United States
- Tunnel City, Wisconsin, United States
- Tunnel Creek, creek in Tunnel Creek National Park, Kimberley, Australia
- Tunnel Mountain, mountain in Bow River Valley of Banff National Park in Alberta, Canada

== Literature ==
- The Tunnel (Kellermann novel), 1913 novel by Bernhard Kellermann
- The Tunnel, 1919 novel by Dorothy Richardson
- The Tunnel (Sabato novel), 1948 Argentine psychological novel by Ernesto Sabato
- "The Tunnel" (short story), 1952 story by Friedrich Dürrenmatt
- The Tunnel, 1977 novel by Robert Byrne
- "The Tunnel", short story by Ruskin Bond from 1980 collection The Road to the Bazaar
- The Tunnel (Gass novel), 1995 novel by William H. Gass
- Tunnels (novel), 2007 novel by Roderick Gordon and Brian Williams
- The Tunnel, 2020 novel by A.B. Yehoshua

== Music ==
- Tunnel Records, record label
- Tunnel, 1999 album by Buckethead under his Death Cube K alias
- "Tunnel" (The Screaming Jets song)
- "Tunnel", song on the Wherever You Are (Third Day album)
- "Neighborhood 1 (Tunnels)", song by Arcade Fire

== Technology ==
- Ground effect tunnels, another name for diffusers used on automobiles
- Polytunnel, also known as high tunnel, type of greenhouse
- Shrink tunnel (or heat tunnel), in packaging
- Tunneling protocols in computing, e.g.:
  - HTTP tunnel
  - ICMP tunnel
  - IP tunnel

== Other uses ==
- Nutmeg (football) or tunnel, football technique
- THE Tunnel, or Trans Hudson Express Tunnel, American rail project in New Jersey
- Tunnel (New York nightclub), United States
- The Tunnel (Glasgow nightclub), Scotland
- Tunnels (comedy duo), Japanese comedy duo
- Tunnel effect, a psychological phenomenon
- Tunnel vision, loss of periphery vision

== See also ==
- Conduit (disambiguation)
- Passage (disambiguation)
- Subway (disambiguation)
- Tunneling (disambiguation)
- Tunel (disambiguation)
- Tunnell, surname
- Chunnel
