= Portal North Bridge =

Railroad bridge in New Jersey

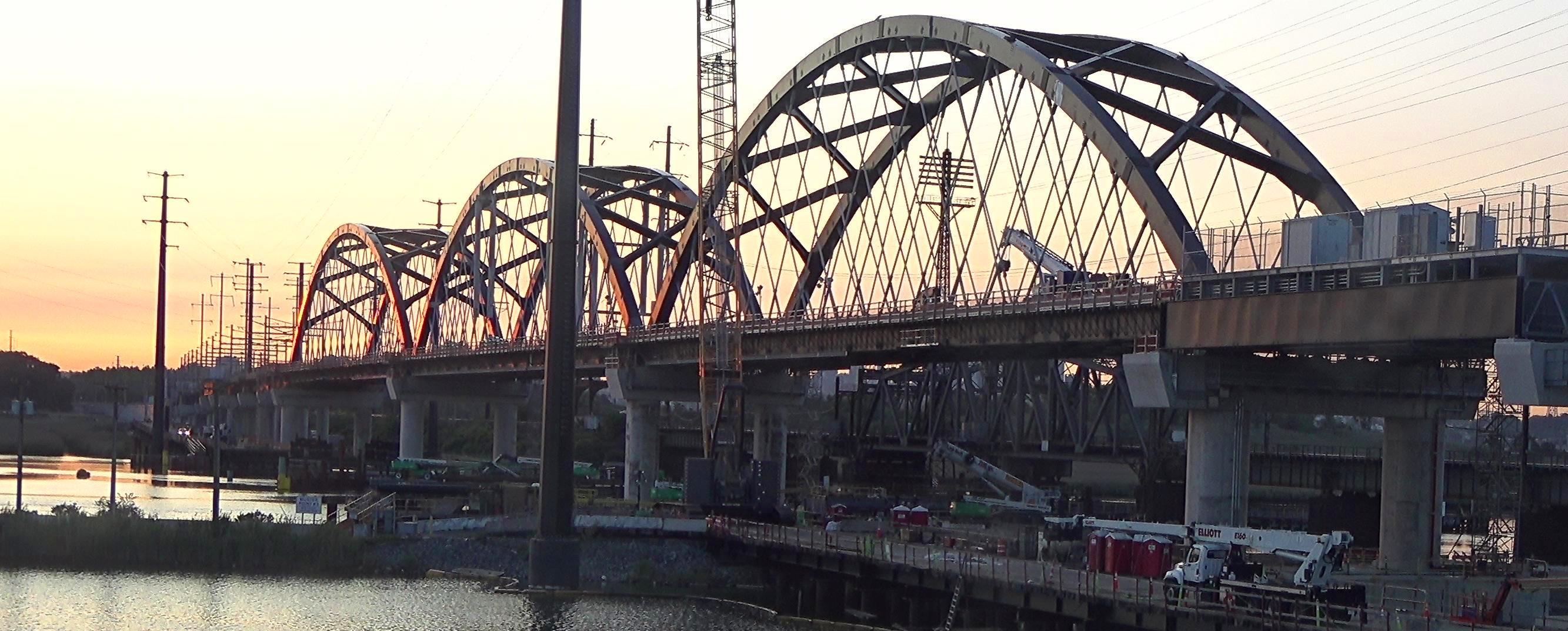
- The bridge under construction in June 2025
- Coordinates: 40°45′13″N 74°5′41″W
- Carries: Northeast Corridor
- Crosses: Hackensack River
- Locale: New Jersey Meadowlands
- Owner: Amtrak, NJ Transit

Characteristics
- Design: Network arch bridge
- Total length: 1,200 ft (370 m) – main spans
- Clearance below: 50 ft (15 m)

Rail characteristics
- No. of tracks: 2
- Track gauge: 4 ft 8 1/2 in (1,435 mm) standard gauge

History
- Construction start: 2017
- Construction end: 2026
- Opened: March 13, 2026
- Inaugurated: March 12, 2026
- Replaces: Portal Bridge

Location
- Interactive map of Portal North Bridge

The Portal North Bridge is a railroad bridge that carries the Northeast Corridor (NEC) over the Hackensack River in Hudson County, New Jersey. It is located in Secaucus west of Secaucus Junction and Kearny east of the Sawtooth Bridges. The bridge, used by Amtrak and NJ Transit, entered into service on March 13, 2026.

The bridge is part of the Gateway Program to rehabilitate and expand the NEC between Newark Penn Station and New York Penn Station and replace the 115 year-old swing-span Portal Bridge. It is a fixed span (with the main spans formed by three steel tied arches) with a vertical clearance of 50 feet (15 m) above mean water level and allows train speeds of at least 90 mph (140 km/h).

== Planning ==
=== Initial planning ===
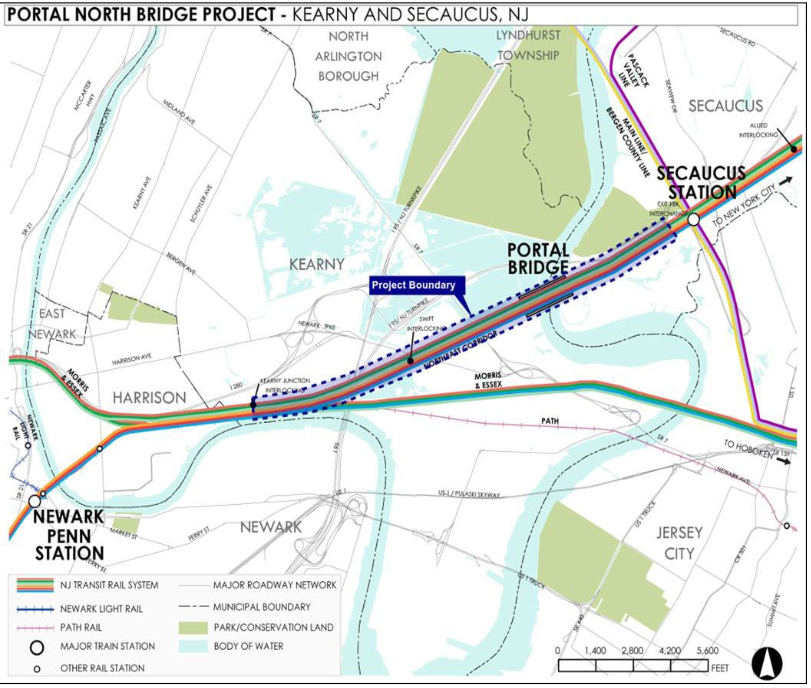
The Portal Bridge segment of the Gateway Program includes the new construction and rehabilitation of 2.5 miles (4.0 km) of rail viaducts and embankments between Secaucus Junction and the Sawtooth Bridges

Opened in 1910, the original Portal Bridge is considered obsolete, which reduces the speed and capacity of the line. It has been called a "choke-point" and “Achilles’ heel of the Northeast Corridor”. The bridge requires millions of dollars of yearly maintenance.

In December 2008, the Federal Railroad Administration approved a $1.34 billion project to replace the Portal Bridge with two new bridges: a three-track bridge to the north, and a two-track bridge to the south. The new bridges were then scheduled to be completed in 2017, at which time the Portal Bridge was to be dismantled. In course of design work the number of tracks on the north bridge was reduced from three to two.

In the early design years, cycling advocates, with the support of New Jersey Senator Frank Lautenberg, lobbied to include a bike path that would have become part of the East Coast Greenway. However it was not included in the final design of the Portal North Bridge.

In 2009, New Jersey applied for $38.5 million in funding for the replacement from the American Recovery and Reinvestment Act of 2009. On January 28, 2010, the federal funds were released as a TIGER grant as part of a larger package of $112 million for the entire Northeast Corridor. The $38.5 million in federal funds were intended for final design for the new bridge.

The original timeline for the project called for construction of the new bridge to begin in 2010, with the bridge replacement to be complete by 2017. Due to cancellation of the Access to the Region's Core project by New Jersey governor Chris Christie in 2010, as well as to funding issues, this original plan was reduced to a single two-track bridge constructed north of the current bridge with room for a new bridge south of the current bridge left open to follow.

In 2014, design work for the new Portal Bridge North had been completed. Preliminary site-preparation work for one span, Portal Bridge North, began in October 2017 and was expected to be complete in 2019. A second bridge to the south—Portal Bridge South, which would carry two additional tracks across the Hackensack River—remains unfunded as of 2024.

=== Funding ===
Progress on the Portal North Bridge had stalled due to lack of funding. In April 2011, Amtrak applied for federal funding of $570 million for construction, with New Jersey expected to commit $150 million. As of 2014, however, the project was lacking $940 million in funding. The Port Authority of New York and New Jersey planned to contribute $300 million to the project.

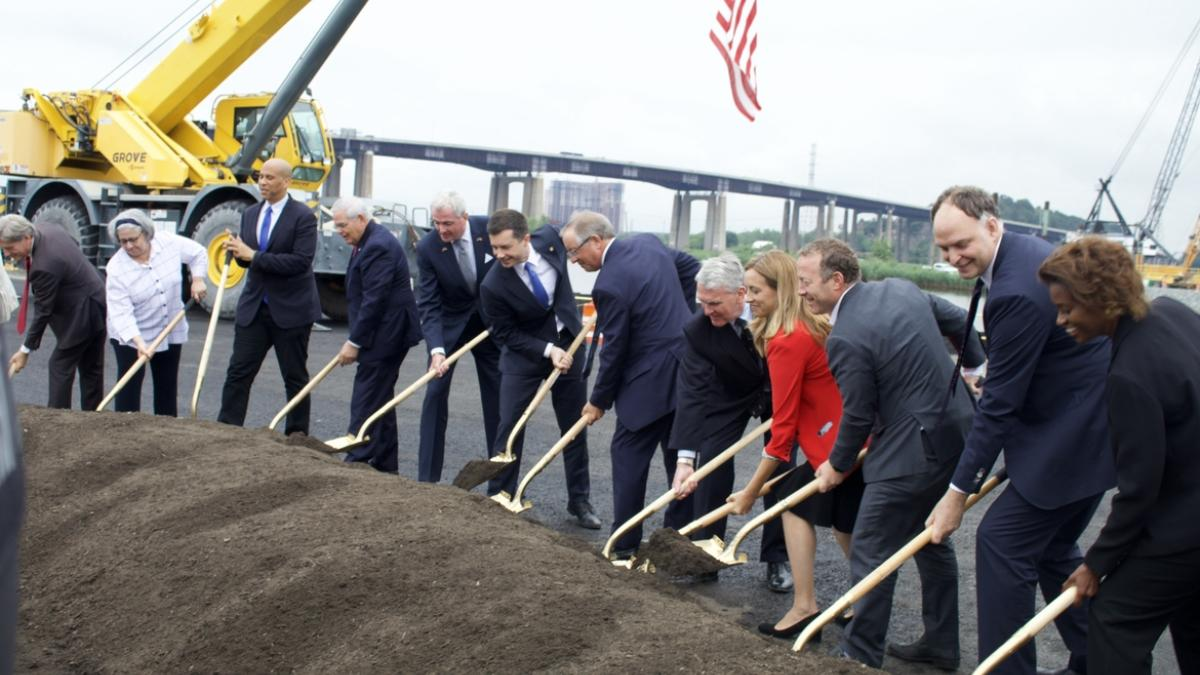
Groundbreaking ceremony for the Portal North Bridge, August 2022

In October 2015, a $16 million TIGER grant was awarded for use to support early construction activities such as realignment of a 138kV transmission monopole, constructing a temporary fiber optic cable pole line, building a finger pier construction access structure, a service access road and a 560-foot retaining wall. The work was completed in February 2019.

As of 2016, the expected schedule was for engineering phase to begin in 2017 and revenue service to start in 2024. In May 2017, NJ Transit awarded a contract to carry out this work. In June 2017, the Gateway Development Corporation formally applied for federal funding for the project. The Federal Transit Administration (FTA) approved the Environmental Impact Statement for the replacement bridge in August 2017. Preliminary construction and preparation work for the first of two replacement bridges began in October 2017. Amtrak has estimated the cost of the bridge's replacement to be $1.5 billion.

Jersey City, which owns a 14-acre (5.7 ha) parcel originally earmarked for preservation and recreation, will sell it to make way for construction of the bridge.

In June 2018, the State of New Jersey approved $600 million in bonds to finance the project. Despite state funding, the federal government withheld funds for the project. On June 24, 2019, the state governments of New York and New Jersey passed legislation to create the bi-state Gateway Development Commission, whose job it is to oversee the planning, funding, and construction of the rail tunnels and bridges of Gateway Program. In September 2019, NJ Transit submitted a revised plan to the federal government clarifying the "local" contribution, which includes funding from Pennsylvania, New Jersey, New York, and Amtrak.

On February 10, 2020, the replacement project was upgraded to "medium-high" priority by the FTA, thereby becoming eligible for funding under the Capital Investment Grants Program. Despite his skepticism of the Gateway Program, President Donald Trump signaled that he would not stand in the way of the Portal Bridge Replacement Project after dinner with New Jersey Governor Phil Murphy. In early July 2020, the FTA approved $767 million in funding for the project. In late May, Amtrak received $55 million from the same agency for the replacement bridge.

== Construction and opening ==
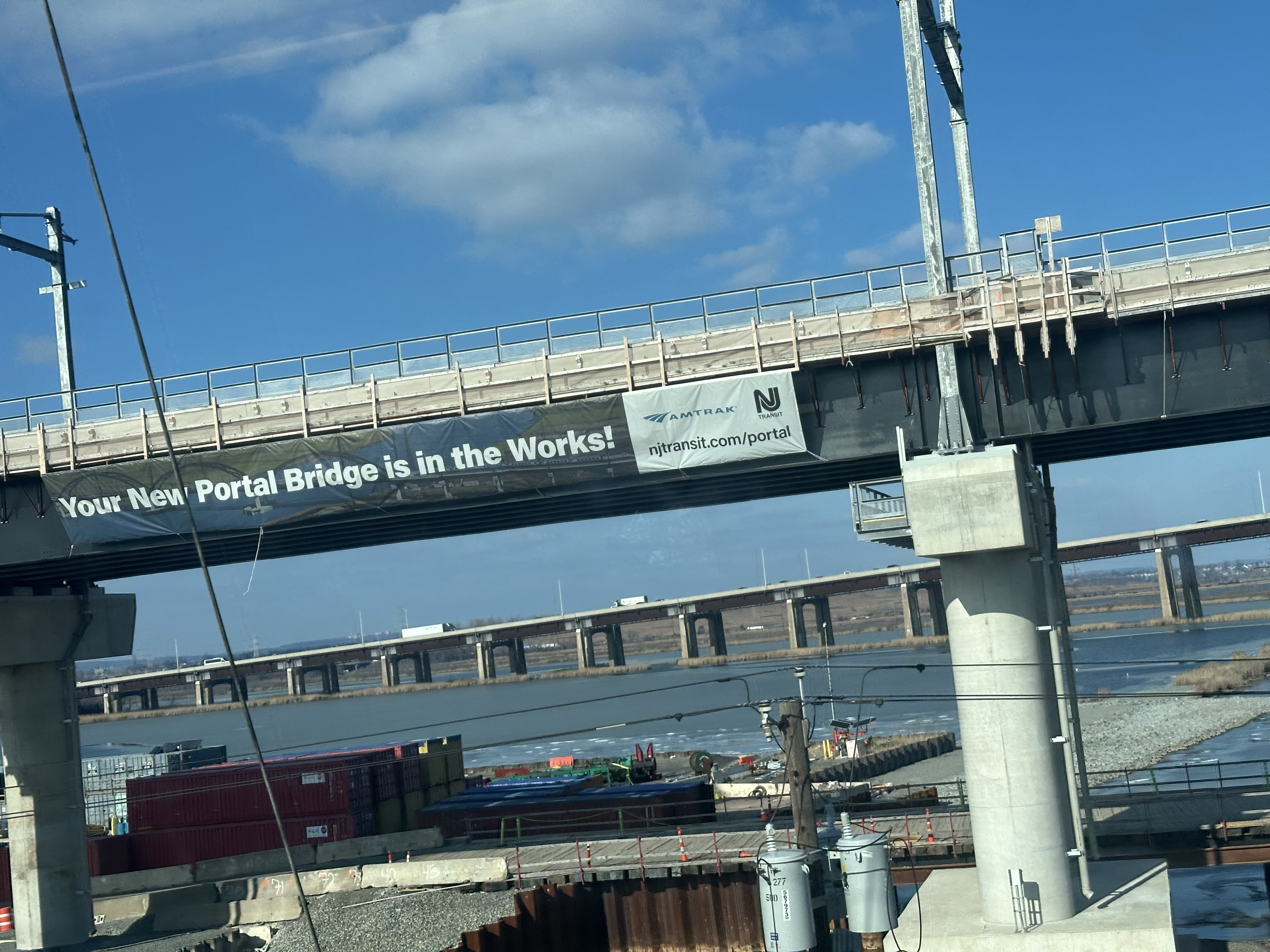
Portal North Bridge under construction, January 2025, with sign from Amtrak and NJ Transit on it for viewing from existing Portal Bridge

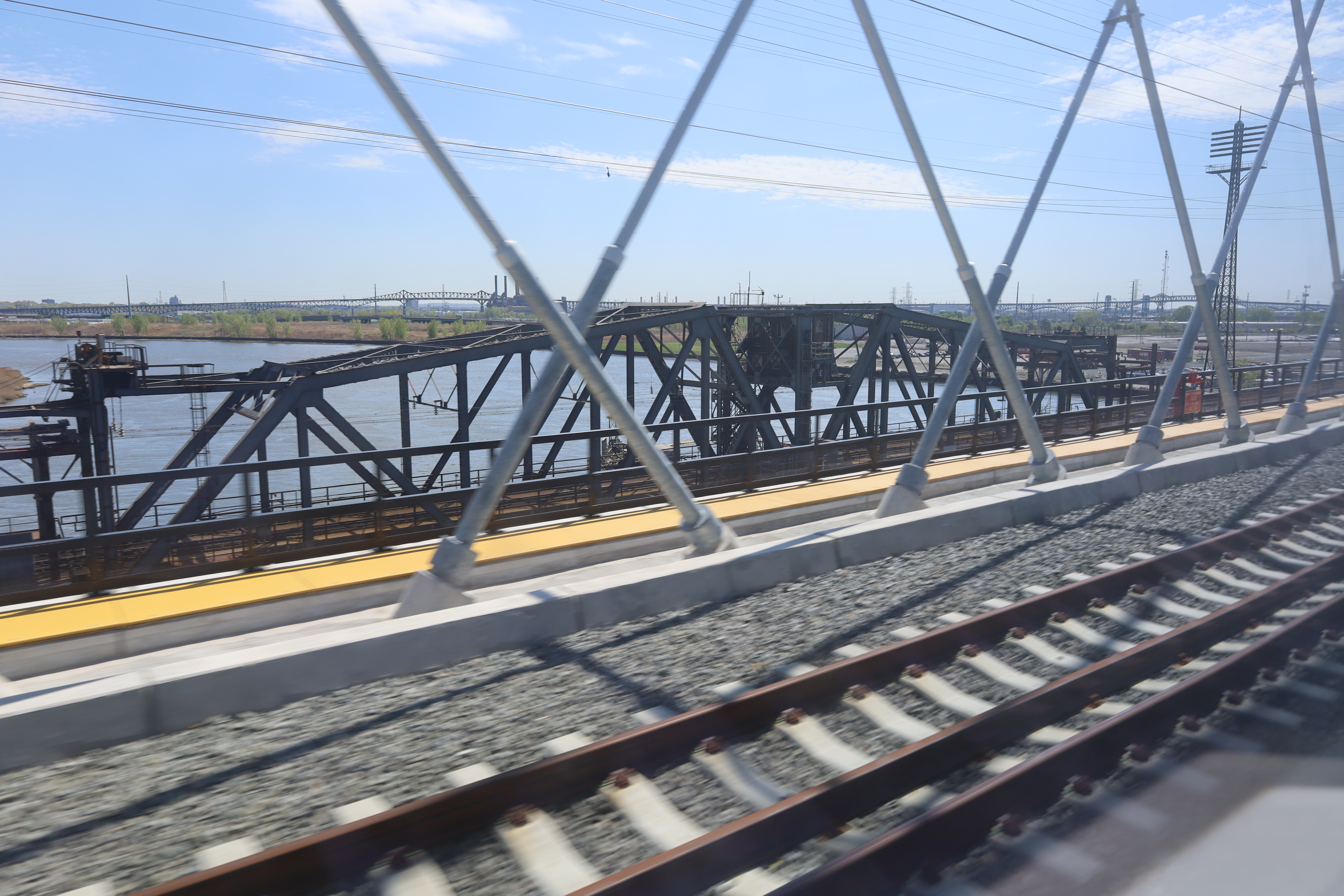
The old Portal Bridge viewed from an Acela train on the new Portal North Bridge in 2026

On October 12, 2021, the NJ Transit board awarded a $1.56 billion construction contract for the new bridge. Construction of the new bridge was given final approval and Notice to Proceed (NTP) in April 2022. After multiple delays, construction on the new bridge began on August 1, 2022. The original Portal Bridge is scheduled to be demolished in July 2028.

On May 13, 2024, Amtrak and NJ Transit announced that the progress of construction reached the halfway milestone towards completion. Amtrak announced that the project was not only on time but possibly may be completed a year earlier than expected and under the expected budgeted cost of $1.5 billion. The first of the Portal North Bridge's three arches was floated into place in November 2024. and the last arch was floated into place in February 2025.

In January 2026, Amtrak and NJ Transit announced that Amtrak would perform a "cutover" from February 15 to March 15, 2026, to connect one track of Portal North Bridge to the existing right of way. The work includes the removal of existing catenary poles in the planned alignment, installation of two interlockings, and 4,500 ft (1,400 m) of new track. Temporary service reductions of both NJ Transit and Amtrak trains on the Northeast Corridor during the cut over period were also announced, with normal schedules planned to return after the completion of safety testing.

The bridge opened on March 13, 2026, three days ahead of its planned March 16 debut. Officials accelerated the opening after overhead wire problems on the existing Portal Bridge caused delays of up to one hour on the Northeast Corridor, with trains making local stops between Trenton and Newark Penn Station and on the North Jersey Coast Line between Rahway and Newark Penn Station.

The second cutover began on October 9, 2026 and lasted for five weeks, ending on November 14, 2026.

== See also ==
- List of crossings of the Hackensack River
- List of bridges, tunnels, and cuts in Hudson County, New Jersey
- List of NJ Transit movable bridges
- List of Northeast Corridor infrastructure
- High-speed rail in the United States
