= Douglas Bell =

Douglas Bell may refer to:

- Douglas John Bell (1893–1918), South African World War I flying ace
- Doug Bell (game designer) (born 1961), American computer game developer
- Doug Bell (sportscaster) (born 1961), American sportscaster
- Dougie Bell (born 1959), Scottish footballer
- Douglas Bell (athlete) (1908–1944), English athlete
- Douglas Bell (politician) (1926–2021), Canadian politician
- L. Douglas Bell (born 1958), American physicist

== See also ==
- George Douglas Hutton Bell (1905–1993), British plant breeder
