= Rapid transit (disambiguation) =

Rapid transit is a type of mass transit system in an urban area with high capacity, high frequency not needing timetables, is fast and is segregated from other traffic.

Rapid transit may also refer to:

- Bus rapid transit, a term applied to a variety of public transportation systems using buses
- Personal rapid transit, a term applied to a variety of public transportation systems using specially built guideways
- Bombardier Advanced Rapid Transit, a rapid transit system manufactured by Bombardier Transportation
- Rapid Transit (play), a 1927 play by Lajos Egri
- "Rapid Transit", a song by Neil Young & Crazy Horse from the 1981 album Re·ac·tor

== See also ==
- Subway (disambiguation)
- Mass Rapid Transit (disambiguation)
- List of rapid transit systems
