= Water tunnel =

Water tunnel may refer to:

- Water tunnel (physical infrastructure), a tunnel used to transport water, typically underground
- Qanat water management system
- Water tunnel (hydrodynamic), an experimental facility used for testing the hydrodynamic behavior of submerged bodies in flowing water, similar to a wind tunnel

== See also ==
- Water (disambiguation)
- Tunnel (disambiguation)
