= Portal Bridge =

Railroad bridge in New Jersey

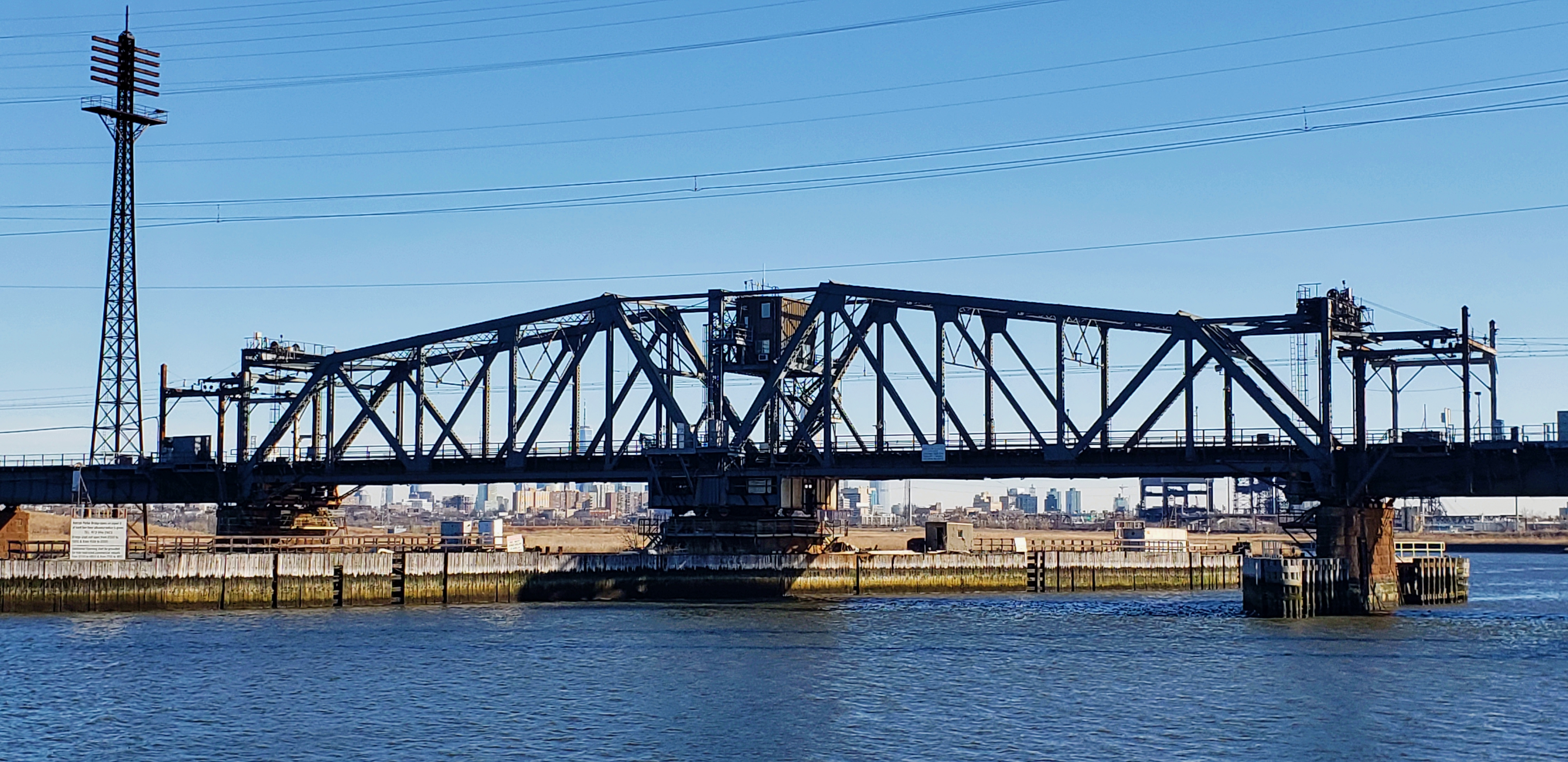
- The bridge in 2021
- Coordinates: 40°45′13″N 74°5′41″W
- Carries: Northeast Corridor
- Crosses: Hackensack River
- Locale: New Jersey Meadowlands
- Owner: Amtrak

Characteristics
- Design: Pratt truss swing bridge
- Material: Bessemer steel
- Total length: 961 ft (293 m)
- No. of spans: 6 deck girder + 1 swing span
- Clearance below: 23 ft (7.0 m)

History
- Constructed by: Pennsylvania Steel Company
- Inaugurated: 1910
- Closed: 2026
- Replaced by: Portal North Bridge

Statistics
- Daily traffic: 450 trains (as of 2015)

Location
- Interactive map of Portal Bridge

The Portal Bridge is a two-track rotating swing-span railroad bridge over the Hackensack River in Kearny and Secaucus, New Jersey, United States. It is on the Northeast Corridor just west of Secaucus Junction and east of the Sawtooth Bridges. Owned and operated by Amtrak and used extensively by NJ Transit, it was the busiest train span in the Western Hemisphere, carrying between 150,000 and 200,000 passengers per day on approximately 450 daily trains (an average of one train every two minutes during the day).

Opened in November 1910, the bridge was built by the Pennsylvania Railroad in conjunction with service to the newly constructed Pennsylvania Station in New York City. It is 961 feet (293 m) long. The average bridge clearance of 20 feet (6.1 m) (depending on the tide) requires it to swing open to allow maritime traffic to pass underneath it. By the 2000s, the Portal Bridge train speeds were limited to 60 miles per hour (97 km/h). Replacement of the bridge, part of the first phase of the Gateway Project, began in 2020 after several delays. Operations on the bridge ceased in 2026.

== Design and construction ==
The bridge was built by the Pennsylvania Railroad as part of its New York Tunnel Extension project, which also included the Sawtooth Bridges, North River Tunnels, and Manhattan Transfer station.

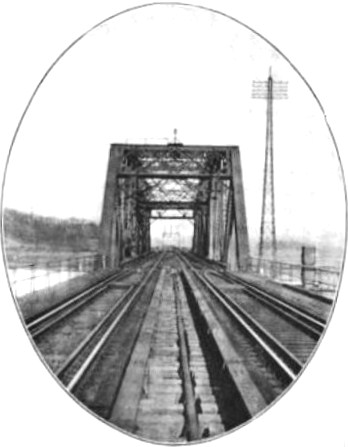
The bridge shortly after its construction in 1910. Note The bridge bed was strengthened with rails on the inside of the tracks as a safety measure. This was a very common construction method during that time.

The Portal Bridge is a 961-foot (293 m) steel structure with masonry abutments. The bridge consists of a 300-foot (91 m) through-truss swing span and six 110-foot-long (34 m) open-deck girder approach spans (three on each side of the center span). The bridge itself is partially made of wood.

Construction of the bridge was begun in August 1905, and the bridge was placed in service on November 27, 1910, based on bridge designs from the 1840s. The bridge was designed to last 100 years. Overhead catenary to supply power to electric locomotives was installed in the 1930s.

Some of the bridge machinery was updated in 1931. Minor repairs were made in the 1970s, and major repairs to structural, mechanical and electrical equipment were completed as part of Amtrak's Northeast Corridor Improvement Project between 1982 and 1984. Timbers were replaced in 2019.

== Operation ==
=== Rail service ===
Commuter rail traffic is carried over the swing bridge. Rail service is currently at capacity, having grown from 40,000 daily passengers in 2005 to 150,000 to 200,000 daily passengers in 2015 on approximately 450 daily trains for Amtrak and New Jersey Transit.

As of 2020, Amtrak operated some 293 scheduled trains a week in both directions (about 42 per day) over this segment of the Northeast Corridor between Newark Penn Station and New York Penn Station. Five NJ Transit rail lines (Northeast Corridor Line, North Jersey Coast Line, Morris and Essex Lines, Montclair-Boonton Line, and Raritan Valley Line) with 388 trains use the bridge each weekday in both directions.

=== River traffic ===
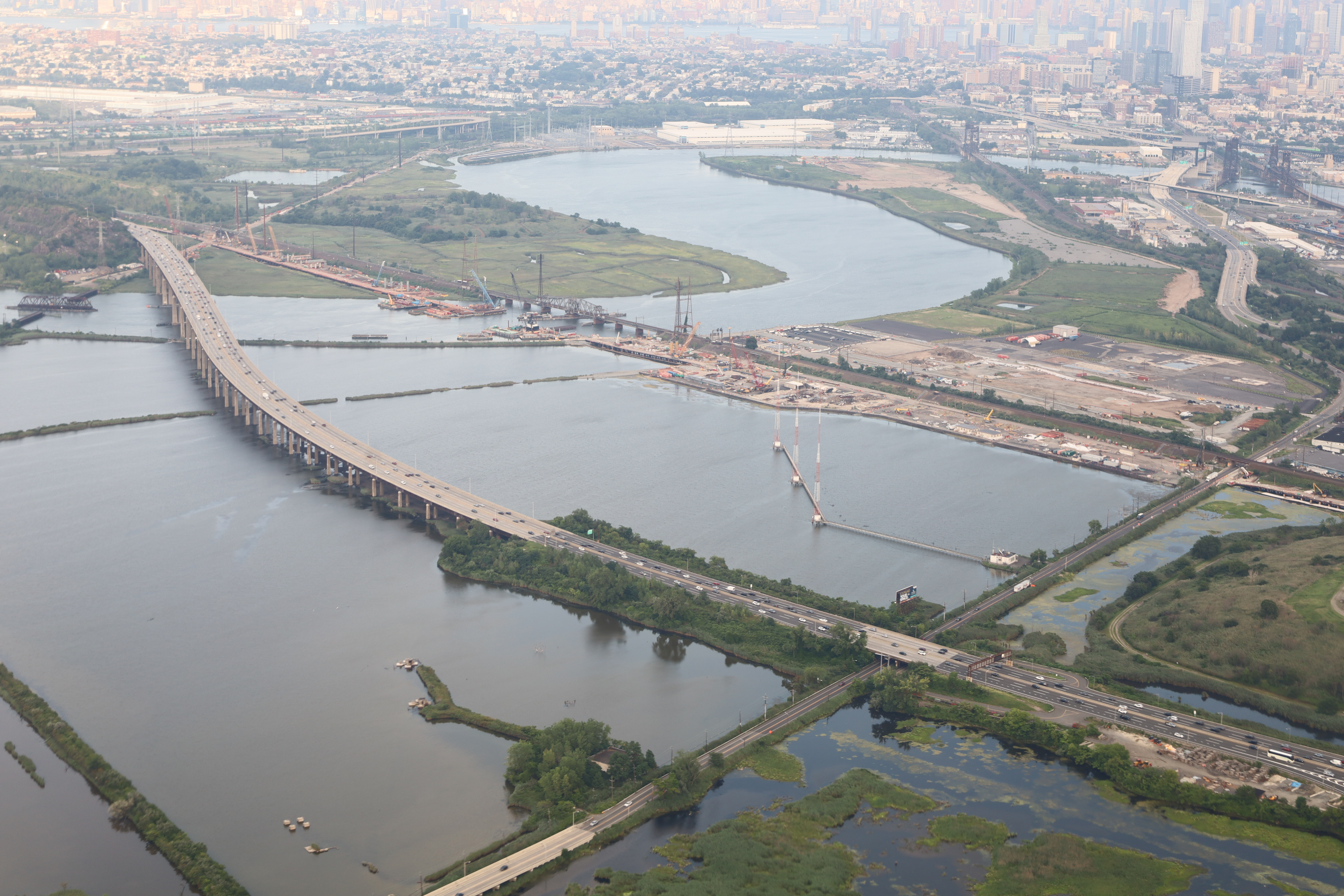
The Portal Bridge in 2023 (center), with construction for the Portal North Bridge visible. The Lewandowski Bridge carrying the New Jersey Turnpike is at left.

River traffic along the Hackensack River can flow through the swing bridge at certain times of the day. Schedules prohibit the Portal Bridge from opening weekdays 5 am to 10 am and 3 pm to 8 pm, during peak commuter travel periods over the bridge. At other times, the bridge opens on signal if a vessel gives two-hour notice, also in the hours leading up to peak periods, which can affect train schedules.

When closed to river traffic, the bridge bears upon six wedge blocks. Two blocks are at each end of the bridge while two more sit adjacent to the center of the bridge. After the wedges are withdrawn, the center-bearing supports the structure as the bridge is swung open and returns it to its closed position once the river traffic has passed through one or both of the navigation channels.

As of 2015, the only regularly scheduled commercial traffic on the river was a barge transporting sludge from the Bergen County Utilities Authority sewage treatment plant in Little Ferry to the Passaic Valley Sewerage Commission plant in Newark. For the last four months of 2014, of the 90 times the bridge was opened, 75 were to provide service to the sludge barge. The bridge has caused numerous delays and residual delays up and down the Northeast Corridor from Boston MA to Washington DC when there is an issue with closing the bridge after maritime traffic passes through, although Amtrak does not keep specific records of delays. All sludge had been trucked since 2016. In 2021, it was announced that the sludge barges would resume.

=== Operational issues ===
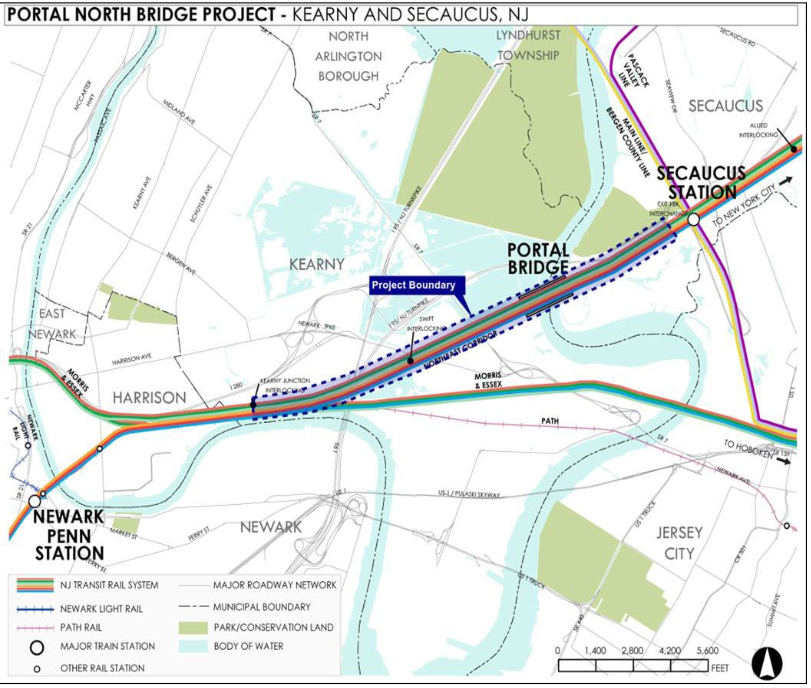
Map of the Portal Bridge and the rail environment it is used in

The Portal Bridge has been called the Achilles' heel of the Northeast Corridor for several reasons. Currently, the bridge limits train speeds to 60 mph (97 km/h) The bridge's lowest beams are just 23 feet (7.0 m) above the surface of the Hackensack River at high tide. As a result, the bridge often has to be opened to allow commercial boats to pass underneath it, which causes more delays for both train and boat traffic.

The Portal Bridge fails to close properly one out of seven times it opens, because the rails can fail to lock into place. In extreme cases, rail crews must bang the rails into place with sledgehammers before trains can cross. One report in 2019 estimated that the North River Tubes and the Portal Bridge contributed to 2,000 hours of delays between 2014 and 2018.

The bridge requires millions of dollars of yearly maintenance. According to several officials, the bridge is considered a "choke-point" which reduces the potential speed and capacity of the line. These officials include U.S. Sen. Bob Menendez (NJ); Drew Galloway, Amtrak Assistant V.P. of Planning and Development and the chief of Planning and Performance for the Northeast Corridor; New Jersey Transit Executive Director Richard Sarles.

== Accidents and incidents ==
=== 1996 derailment ===
The bridge was site of a derailment on November 23, 1996 when the swing bridge failed to close properly. There were no deaths. Thirty-four people were hospitalized. The reason for the derailment was that a rail was 5 inches higher than it was supposed to be, and acted as a ramp. As a result of the derailment, the maximum speed on the bridge was lowered to 60 mph (97 km/h), making the bridge a choke point for the entire Northeast Corridor. The cost of the derailment was estimated at $3.6 million.

=== Fires ===
On May 13, 2005, the bridge caught on fire. NJ Transit engineers believe that the 13kV overhead electrical wires overheated, sending shards of metal towards the creosote-covered wooden fenders at the base of the bridge. The immediate result of the fire was to block all traffic until the next morning. The cost of the incident was $5 million.

On August 4, 2014, the bridge caught on fire, interrupting rail traffic for half an hour.

== Replacement ==
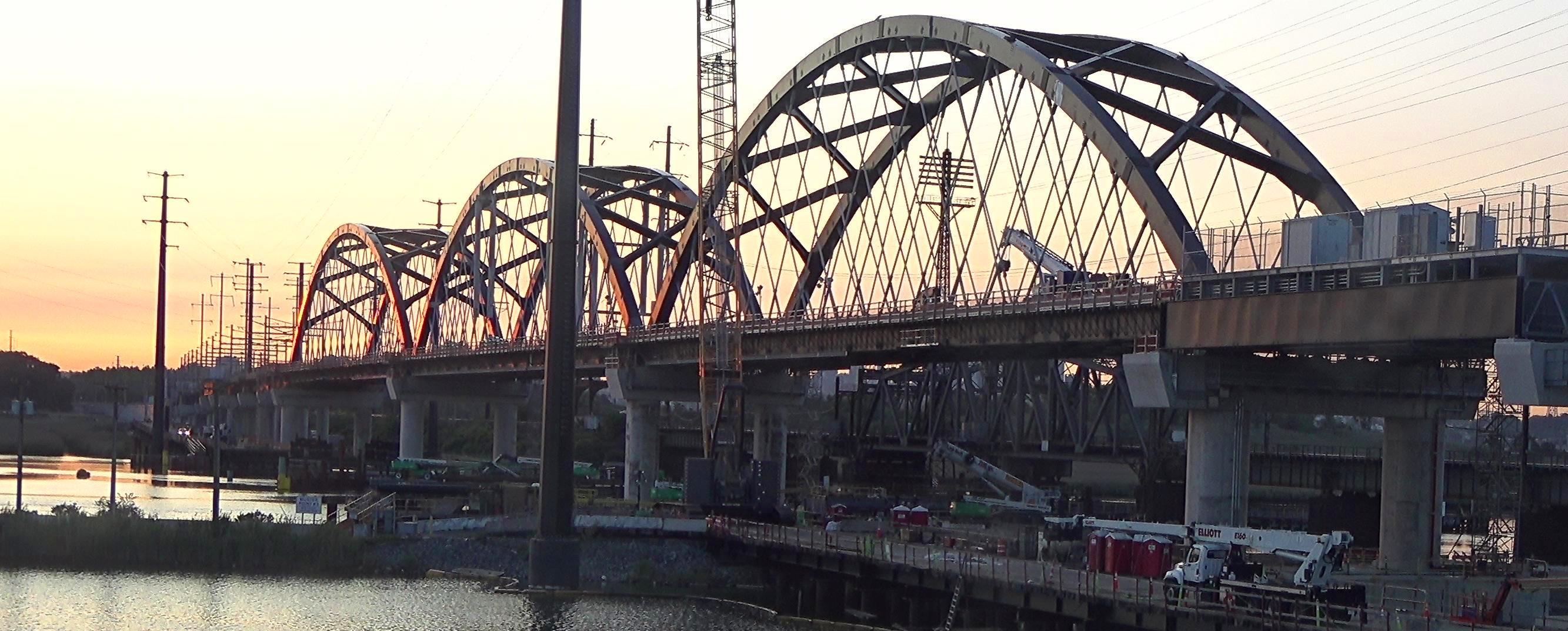
The replacement Portal North Bridge under construction, viewed from the Kearny side of the Hackensack River, June 2025

In December 2008, the Federal Railroad Administration approved a $1.34 billion project to replace the Portal Bridge with two new bridges: a two-track bridge to the north, and a two-track bridge to the south. Due to cancellation of the Access to the Region's Core project by New Jersey governor Chris Christie in 2010, as well as to funding issues, this original plan was reduced to a single two-track bridge constructed north of the current bridge with room for a new bridge south of the current bridge left open to follow.

In 2014, design work for the new Portal Bridge North had been completed. The proposed Portal North Bridge would be a fixed span rising over 50 feet (15 m) above mean water level, and would allow train speeds of at least 90 mph (140 km/h). The new bridge would be a part of the Amtrak Gateway Project—itself a partial replacement of the Access to the Region's Core—estimated to cost $13.5 billion.

After initially refusing to provide any funding for the project, the first Trump administration allowed the project to move forward in February 2020. The bridge replacement is estimated to cost $1.8 billion. Funding comprises $811 million from the State of New Jersey, $766.5 million from the Federal Transit Administration (FTA), $261.5 million from Amtrak and $57.1 million from the Federal Highway Administration (FHWA). Construction of the new bridge was given final approval to proceed in April 2022 and later began on August 1, 2022.

On May 13, 2024, Amtrak and NJ Transit announced that the progress of construction has reached the halfway milestone towards completion. Amtrak announced that the project was not only on time but possibly may be completed a year earlier than expected and under the expected budgeted cost of $1.5 billion. The first of the Portal North Bridge's three arches was floated into place in November 2024. and the last arch was floated into place in February 2025.

The first track was moved from the old bridge to the new one, known as the Portal North Bridge, starting in February 2026. The first track on the new bridge entered service on March 13, 2026, about two and a half days ahead of the planned opening on March 16. A catenary pole had failed on the old bridge, and NJT and Amtrak officials decided to shift rail traffic onto the new bridge early. The second phase of the cutover began on October 9, 2026.

The original Portal Bridge is scheduled to be demolished in 2027.

== See also ==
- List of crossings of the Hackensack River
- Sawtooth Bridges
- List of bridges, tunnels, and cuts in Hudson County, New Jersey
- List of NJ Transit movable bridges
