= Sawtooth Bridges =

Pair of railroad viaducts in New Jersey; owned by Amtrak

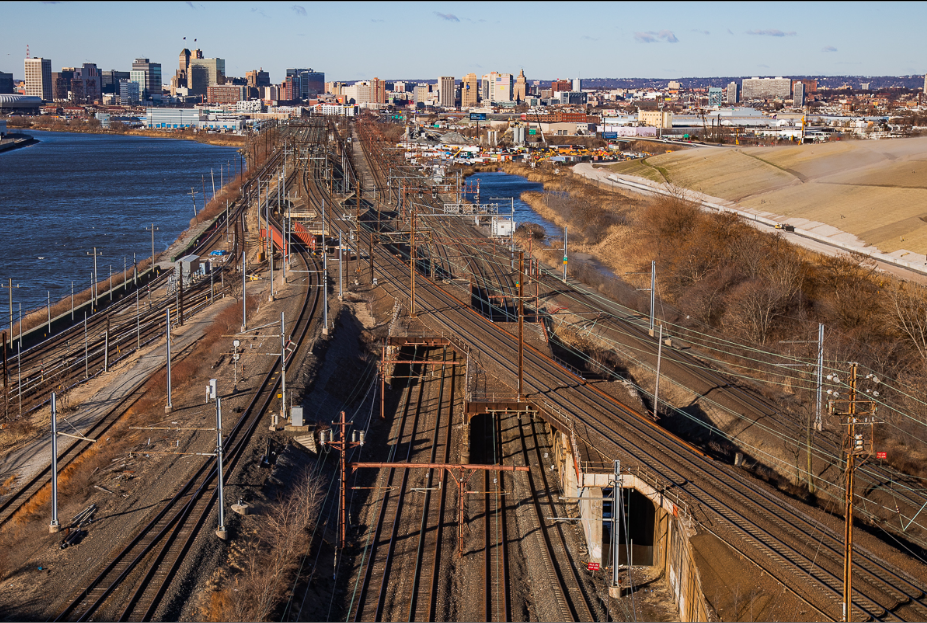
- Looking west at the bridges in 2020
- Coordinates: 40°44′38″N 74°7′30″W
- Carries: Northeast Corridor
- Crosses: NJ Transit, PATH, Conrail
- Locale: New Jersey Meadowlands; Kearny, New Jersey
- Other name(s): Amtrak Bridge No. 7.80; Amtrak Bridge No. 7.96
- Owner: Amtrak
- Heritage status: PRR

Characteristics
- Design: Viaduct
- Total length: 961 ft (293 m)

Rail characteristics
- No. of tracks: 2

History
- Construction start: 1907
- Inaugurated: 1910

Statistics
- Daily traffic: 400+ Amtrak and NJ Transit trains

Location
- Interactive map of Sawtooth Bridges

The Sawtooth Bridges are a pair of railroad bridges that carry the Northeast Corridor (NEC) over a series of NJ Transit, PATH, and Conrail tracks. They are located in the Meadowlands in Kearny, New Jersey, between Newark Penn Station and Secaucus Junction. The name refers to their appearance.

The two bridges are known individually as Amtrak Bridge No. 7.80 and Amtrak Bridge No. 7.96, where the numbers refer to the milepoint (MP) from New York Penn Station. They are separated by a short section of track atop an embankment.

Originally built by the Pennsylvania Railroad, they are now owned and operated by Amtrak. They are slated for replacement as part of the Gateway Program, an infrastructure-improvement program along the NEC.

== Description ==
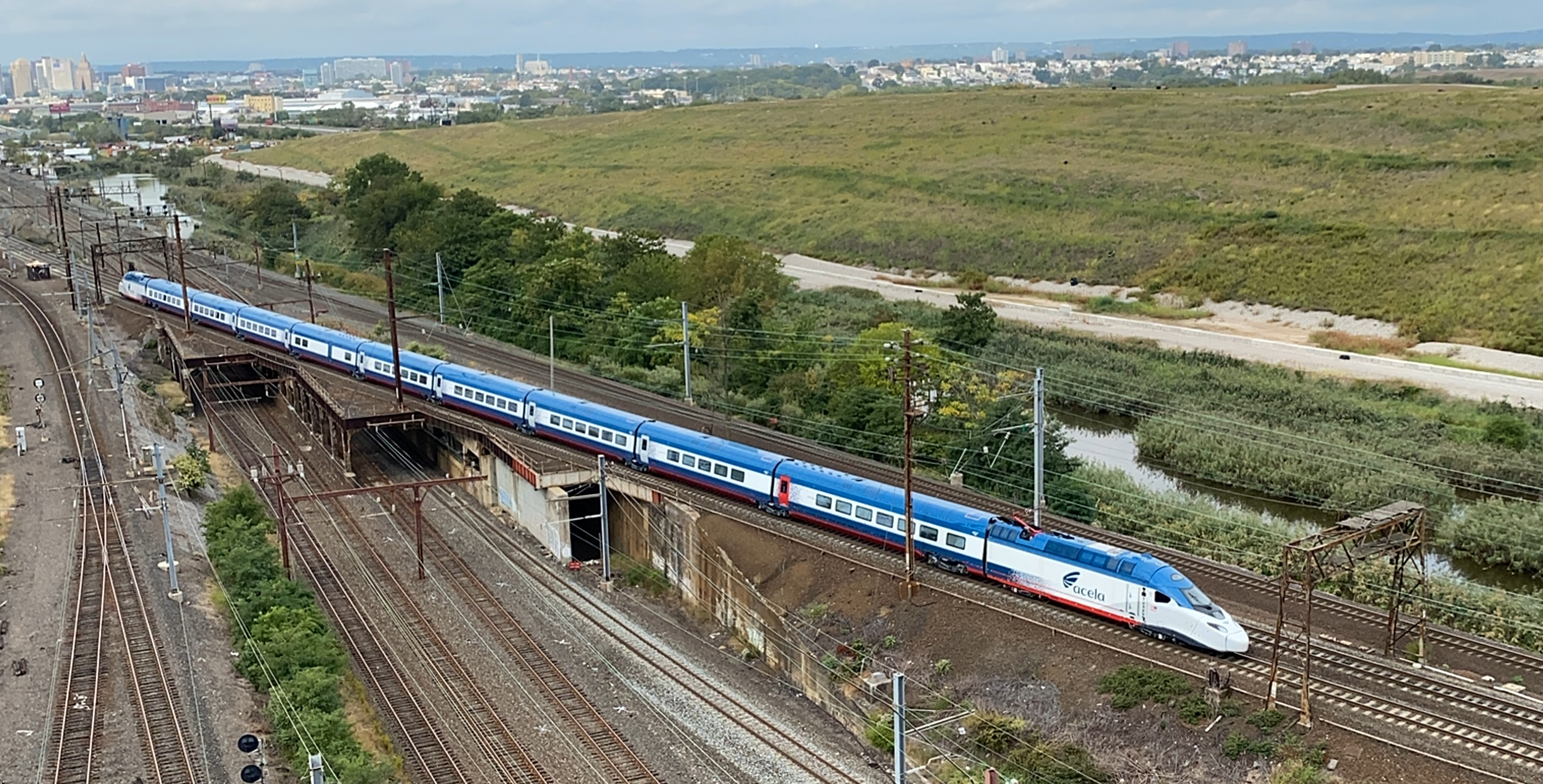
Avelia Liberty trainset crossing Amtrak Bridge No. 7.80

At this stretch of the Northeast Corridor, the rights-of-way of Amtrak, NJ Transit, PATH, and Conrail converge, run parallel, and re-align. Amtrak Bridge No. 7.80 carries two NEC tracks over four NJ Transit commuter rail tracks used by the Montclair-Boonton Line, the Morristown Line and the Gladstone Branch. Amtrak Bridge No. 7.96 carries the two NEC tracks over the westbound track of PATH's Newark–World Trade Center line and the single-track Conrail (CRCX) Center Street Branch freight rail line.

Junctions and interlockings in the vicinity of the bridge allow trains to move between the NEC and NJ Transit lines. The Kearny Connection/"Swift Interlocking" (MP 7.2) allows NJ Transit Midtown Direct transfers between the Morris and Essex Lines and Montclair-Boonton Line west of the bridges, and the NEC east of the bridges leading to New York Penn Station. The Waterfront Connection/"Hudson Interlocking" (MP8.3) uses the single-track "Red Bridge" to allow transfers between the NEC west of the bridges leading to Newark Penn Station, and the NJ Transit line east of the bridges leading to Hoboken Terminal on the Hudson Waterfront; it is generally used by NJ Transit's North Jersey Coast Line or Raritan Valley Line. There is no junction with PATH.

== History ==
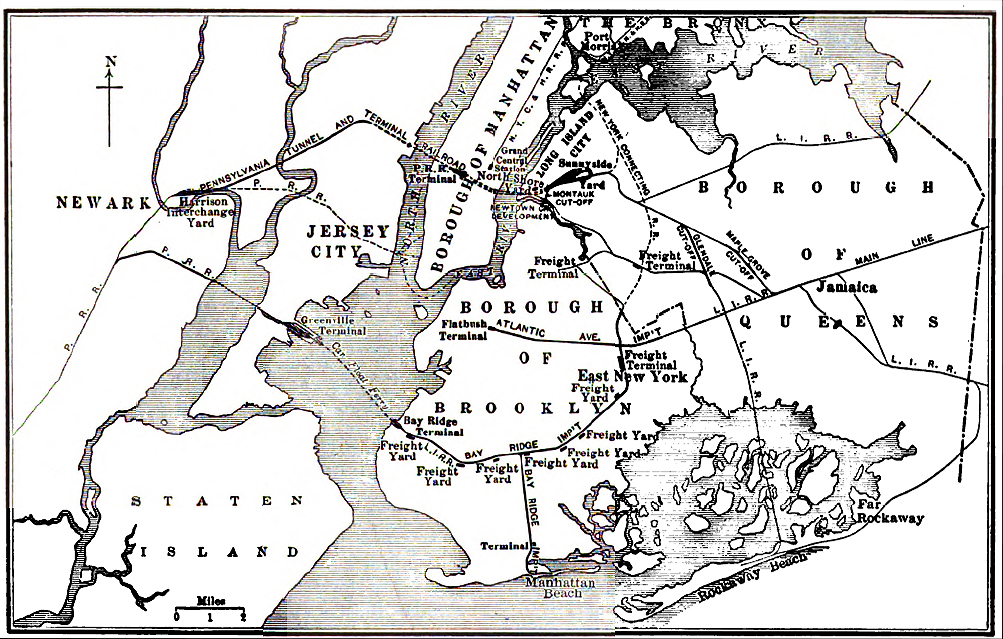
New York Tunnel Extension, 1912

The viaducts were built in 1907 by the Pennsylvania Railroad as part of its New York Tunnel Extension project, which included the Portal Bridge and the North River Tunnels. The bridges are east of the former Manhattan Transfer station.

=== Replacement and expansion to four tracks ===
The Sawtooth Bridges, considered a part of major bottleneck in the busiest section of the Northeast Corridor, are slated for replacement as part of the Gateway Program, an infrastructure improvement program along 10 miles of the rail line between Newark and New York. The plans call for expansion of the right-of-way to four tracks and would also include the construction of new bridges in the Kearny Meadows over Newark Turnpike and Belleville Turnpike. Initial stages of replacement of the nearby Portal Bridge over the Hackensack River began in 2019.

In March 2020, the Federal Railroad Administration (FRA) issued an environmental assessment. Construction would involve the building of a new bridge (Sawtooth Bridge North), where service would be transferred during the demolition of existing Sawtooth Bridge south and building of its replacement. The project will also build a new viaduct for NJ Transit Track 5. As of 2020, the projected year for completion was 2029. As of January 2025, the estimated construction completion is in 2032.

== See also ==
- Bergen Tunnels
- List of bridges, tunnels, and cuts in Hudson County, New Jersey
- List of Northeast Corridor infrastructure
- List of New Jersey railroad junctions
