= Mass Rapid Transit Corporation =

The term Mass Rapid Transit Corporation may refer to:

- Malaysia Rapid Transit Corporation (also known as Mass Rapid Transit Corporation)
- SMRT Trains, a wholly owned subsidiary of SMRT Corporation in Singapore, known as the Mass Rapid Transit Corporation until 2001.

== See also ==
- Mass Rapid Transit (disambiguation)
