= L. Douglas Bell =

American physicist

L. Douglas Bell (born 1958) is an American physicist, focusing in nanoscale electronic and structural characterization of materials and devices using scanning probe methods, tunnel-effect and hot-electron devices for detection and sensing, and novel memory concepts using nanoscale structures. He currently works at the Jet Propulsion Laboratory. Bell is an elected Fellow of the American Physical Society.
