= Tunel =

Tunel or Tünel may refer to:

- TUNEL assay (Terminal deoxynucleotidyl transferase mediated dUTP Nick End Labeling assay), in genetics, a method for detecting DNA fragmentation
- Tunel (band), Yugoslav rock band
- Tunel railway station, railway station in Poland
- Tünel, a historical underground funicular in Istanbul, Turkey
- Tünel, Khövsgöl, a Mongolian sum
- Tunel, a brand of Herbs de Majorca

== See also ==
- Tunnel (disambiguation)
- Tune (disambiguation)
