= Mass Rapid Transit =

Mass Rapid Transit in general refers to a fully grade separated heavy-rail metro system.

The term may also specifically refer to:

- Chennai Mass Rapid Transit System, a rapid transit system in Chennai, India
- Jakarta Mass Rapid Transit, a rapid transit system in Jakarta, Indonesia
- Mass Rapid Transit Corporation (Malaysia), a Malaysian state-owned company
  - Klang Valley Mass Rapid Transit (KVMRT), a rapid transit system in Greater Kuala Lumpur, Malaysia
  - Johor Bahru–Singapore Rapid Transit System (RTS Link), a cross-border rapid transit system linking Johor Bahru and Singapore
- Mass Rapid Transit (Singapore), a rapid transit system in Singapore
- Taichung Mass Rapid Transit or Taichung MRT, a rapid transit system in Taichung, Taiwan
- Taipei Mass Rapid Transit or Taipei Metro, a rapid transit system in Taipei, Taiwan
- Taoyuan Mass Rapid Transit System or Taoyuan Metro, a rapid transit system in Taoyuan, Taiwan
- Kaohsiung Mass Rapid Transit or Kaohsiung Metro, a rapid transit and light rail system in Kaohsiung, Taiwan
- Mass Rapid Transit Authority of Thailand, a government agency responsible for overseeing the operation of rapid transit systems in Thailand
  - Metropolitan Rapid Transit, a rapid transit system in Bangkok, Thailand

== See also ==
- MRT (disambiguation)
- MTR, or Mass Transit Railway, Hong Kong
- Mass Rapid Transit Corporation (disambiguation)
- Rapid transit (disambiguation)
