= Tunneling =

Tunneling or tunnelling may refer to:

- Digging tunnels (the literal meaning)
  - Hobby tunneling
- Quantum tunneling, the quantum-mechanical effect where a particle crosses through a classically forbidden potential energy barrier
- Tunneling (fraud), a fraud committed by a company's own management or by major shareholders
- Tunneling protocol, transmitting one computer network protocol that is encapsulated inside another network protocol

== See also ==
- Tunnel (disambiguation)
