= Pedestrian tunnel =

Pedestrian tunnel may refer to:

- A subway (underpass)
- An underground city
