= Tunnell =

Tunnell is a surname, and may refer to:

- Byron M. Tunnell - Railroad Commission of Texas member and politician
- Ebe W. Tunnell - American merchant and politician
- Emlen Tunnell - African-American football player
- George Tunnell - American vocalist
- James M. Tunnell - American teacher, lawyer and politician
- James M. Tunnell, Jr. - American politician
- Jeff Tunnell - computer game producer, programmer and designer
- Jerrold B. Tunnell (1950–2022) - American mathematician
- Lee Tunnell - American pitcher
- Michael O. Tunnell (born 1950) - American writer, children's literature critic, and educator

== See also ==
- Tunnel

The Tunnell family lived in England in the 18th century, and after the Mayflower, came to America.
