= North River Tunnels =

Rail tunnels in New York and New Jersey

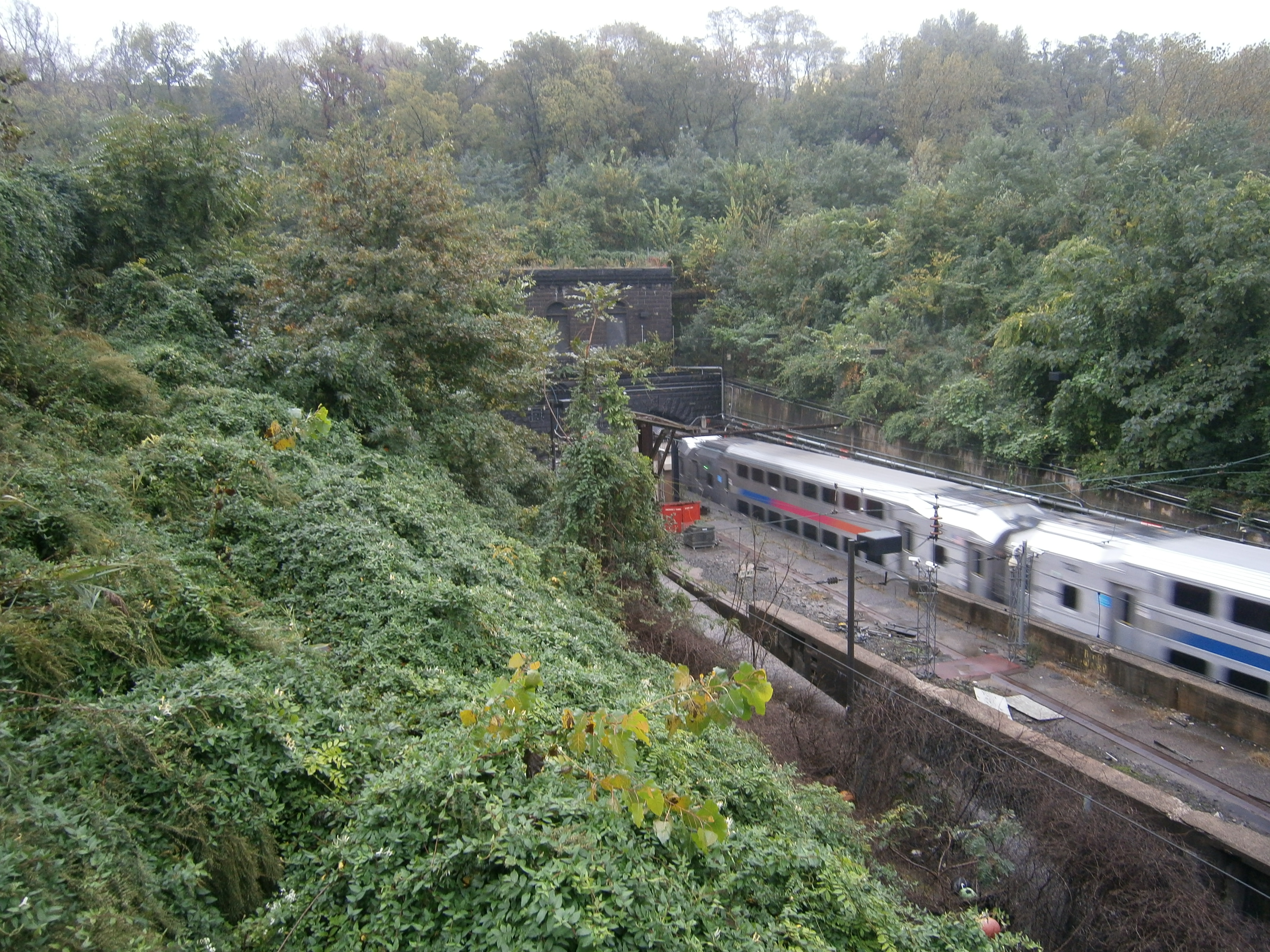
- A NJ Transit train entering the western portal at Bergen Hill in November 2011
- Interactive map of North River Tunnels

Overview
- Line: Northeast Corridor
- Location: Hudson Palisades-Hudson River
- Coordinates: 40.7714°N 74.0419°W
- System: Amtrak and NJ Transit
- Start: Bergen Hill in North Bergen, New Jersey
- End: Pennsylvania Station in Manhattan, New York City
Further information
Operation
Constructed	1904–1908
Opened	November 27, 1910; 115 years ago
Owner	Amtrak
Traffic	Railroad
Character	Passenger
Technical
Design engineer	Charles M. Jacobs
Length	14,575 feet (4,442 m)
No. of tracks	1 per tube
Track gauge	1,435 mm (4 ft 8 1/2 in) standard gauge
Electrified	Third rail and Overhead lines
Operating speed	60 mph (97 km/h)
Min elevation	175 feet (53.3 m) below Bergen Hill
Depth below water	100 feet (30.5 m) below Hudson River
Shipping clearance above	52 feet
Grade	1.30% in Weehawken, 1.923% in Manhattan

The North River Tunnels are a pair of rail tunnels that carry Amtrak and New Jersey Transit passenger lines under the Hudson River between North Bergen, New Jersey, and Pennsylvania Station in Manhattan, New York City. Built between 1904 and 1908 by the Pennsylvania Railroad (PRR) to allow its trains to reach Manhattan, they opened for service in late 1910.

The tunnels allow a maximum of 24 bidirectional crossings per hour, and operate near capacity during peak hours. The tunnels were damaged by extensive flooding brought on by Hurricane Sandy in 2012, causing frequent delays in train operations. In May 2014, Amtrak then stated that one or both of the tunnels would have to be shut down within the next twenty years.

In May 2021, the U.S. Department of Transportation (USDOT) approved construction of two new tunnels. The new tunnels, dubbed the Gateway Tunnels, are scheduled to open in 2035, while rehabilitation of the old tunnels is set to be completed by 2038.

== History ==
=== Context ===
The PRR had consolidated its control of railroads in New Jersey with the lease of United New Jersey Railroad and Canal Company in 1871, extending its network from Philadelphia northward to Jersey City. Crossing the Hudson River remained an obstacle; to the east, the Long Island Rail Road (LIRR) ended at the East River, and in both situations, passengers had to transfer to ferries to Manhattan. This put the PRR at a disadvantage relative to its arch competitor, the New York Central Railroad, which already served Manhattan from the north, and did not need to cross the rivers that flank Manhattan.

After unsuccessfully trying to create a bridge over the Hudson River, the PRR and the LIRR developed several proposals for improved regional rail access in 1892, as part of the New York Tunnel Extension project. The proposals included new tunnels between Jersey City and Manhattan, and possibly one to Brooklyn; a new terminal in Midtown Manhattan for both the PRR and LIRR, completion of the Hudson Tubes (later called PATH), and a bridge proposal. These proposals finally came to fruition at the turn of the century, when the PRR created subsidiaries to manage the project. The Pennsylvania, New Jersey and New York Railroad, incorporated on February 13, 1902, was to oversee construction of the North River Tunnels. The PNJ&NY would also be in charge of the Meadows Division, which would handle the construction of the North River Tunnel approaches on the New Jersey side of the Hudson River.

The original proposal for the PRR and LIRR terminal in Midtown Manhattan, published in June 1901, called for the construction of a bridge across Hudson River between 45th and 50th Streets in Manhattan, as well as two closely spaced terminals for the LIRR and PRR. This would enable passengers to travel between Long Island and New Jersey without changing trains. In December 1901, the plans were modified so that the PRR would construct the North River Tunnels under the Hudson River, instead of building a bridge over it. The PRR cited costs and land value as a reason for constructing a tunnel rather than a bridge, since the cost of a tunnel would be one-third that of a bridge. The North River Tunnels themselves would consist of between two and four steel tubes with a diameter of 18.5 to 19.5 feet (5.6 to 5.9 m). The New York Tunnel Extension quickly gained opposition from the New York City Board of Rapid Transit Commissioners, who objected that they would not have jurisdiction over the new tunnels, as well as from the Interborough Rapid Transit Company, which saw the New York Tunnel Extension as a potential competitor to its own, then incomplete, rapid transit service. The project was approved by the New York City Board of Aldermen in December 1902, with a 41–36 vote. The North and East River Tunnels were to be built under the beds of their respective rivers, and the PRR and LIRR lines would converge at New York Penn Station, an expansive Beaux-Arts edifice situated between 31st and 33rd Streets in Manhattan. The entire project was expected to cost over $100 million.

=== Design and construction ===
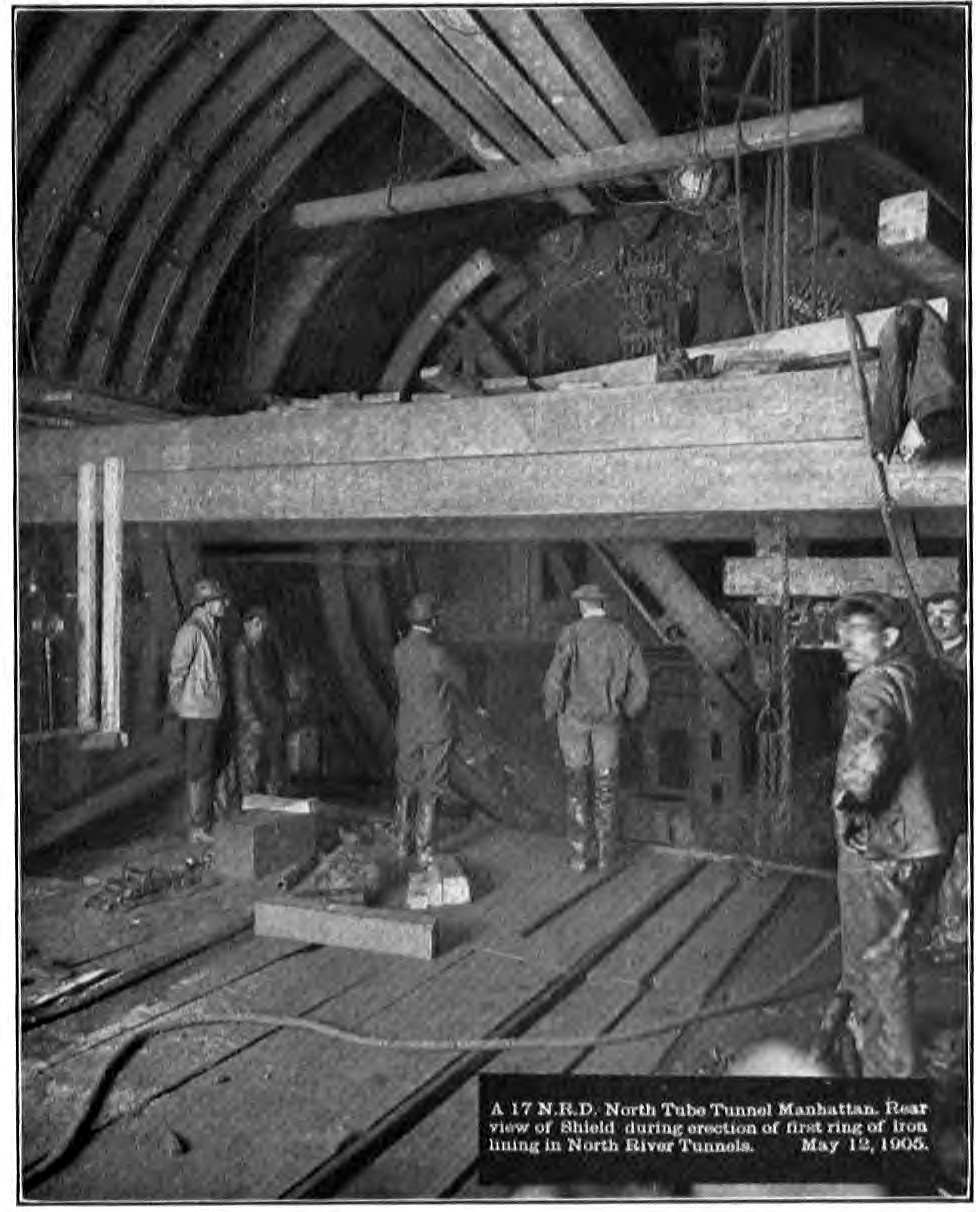
Construction of the northern tube under the Hudson River in 1905

Led by Chief Engineer Charles M. Jacobs, the tunnel design team began work in 1902. The contract for building the North River Tunnels was awarded to O'Rourke Engineering Construction Company in 1904. Originally, the tunnel would have comprised three tubes, but this was later downsized to two tubes. The first construction work comprised the digging of two shafts: one just east of 11th Avenue a few hundred yards east of the river's eastern shore; and a larger one in Weehawken, a few hundred yards west of the river's western shore. Construction on the Weehawken Shaft started in June 1903. It was completed in September 1904 as a concrete-walled rectangular pit, 56 by 116 ft (17.1 by 35.4 m) at the bottom and 76 ft (23.2 m) deep.

When the shafts were complete, O'Rourke began work on the tunnels proper. The project was divided into three parts, each managed by a resident engineer: the "Terminal Station" in Manhattan; the "River Tunnels", east from the Weehawken Shaft and under the Hudson River; and the Bergen Hill tunnels, west from the Weehawken Shaft to the tunnel portals on the west side of the Palisades. The tunnels were built with drilling and blasting techniques and tunnelling shields, which were placed at three locations and driven towards each other. The shields proceeded west from Manhattan, east and west from Weehawken, and east from the Bergen portals.

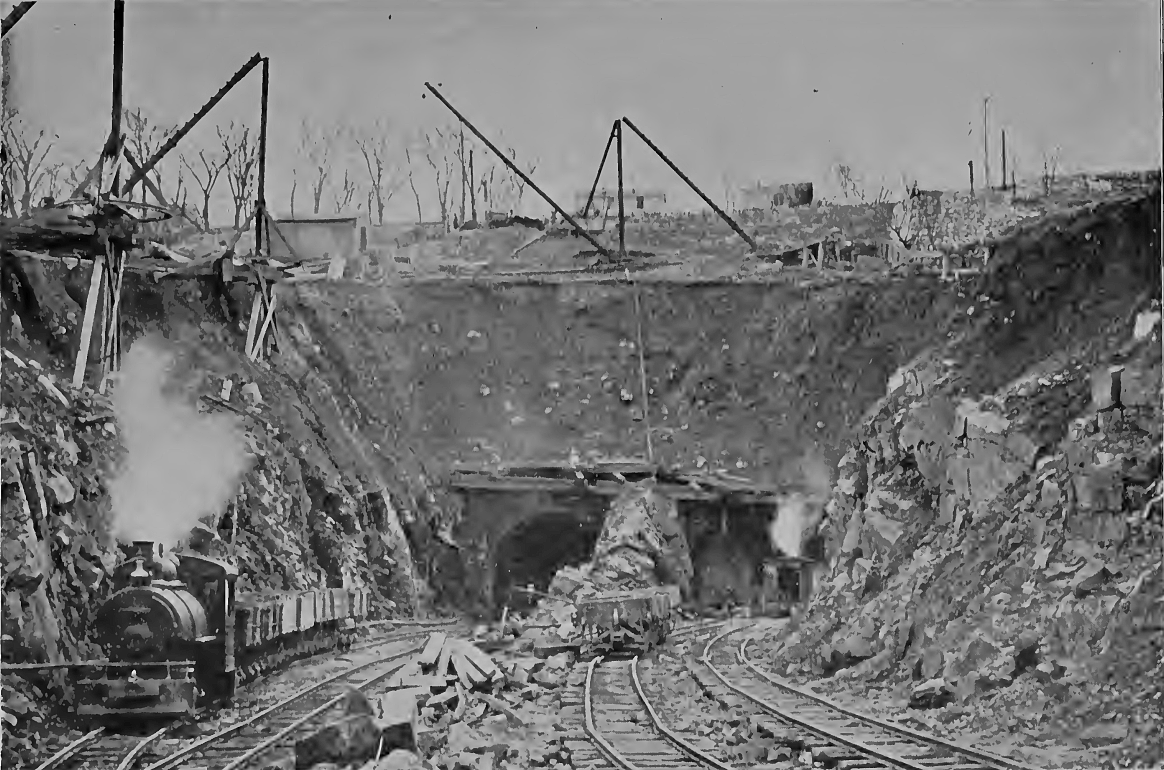
Western tunnel portal under construction near Bergen Hill in 1906

Under the river itself, the tunnels started in rock, using drill and blast, but the strata under the river was pure mud for a considerable depth. As a result, this part was driven under compressed air, using 194-ton shields that met about 3,000 feet (910 m) from the Weehawken and Manhattan portals. The mud was such that the shield was shoved forward without taking any ground; however, it was found that the shield was easier to steer if some mud was taken in through holes at the front, since the mud had the consistency of toothpaste. After the tubes had been excavated, they were lined with 2.5-foot-wide (0.76 m) segmental cast-iron rings, each weighing 22 tons. The segments were bolted together and lined with 22 inches (56 cm) of concrete. The two ends of the northern tube under the river met in September 1906; at that time it was the longest underwater tunnel in the world.

Meanwhile, the John Shields Construction Company had begun in 1905 to bore through Bergen Hill, the lower Hudson Palisades; William Bradley took over in 1906 and the tunnels to the Hackensack Meadows were completed in April 1908.

=== Opening and use ===
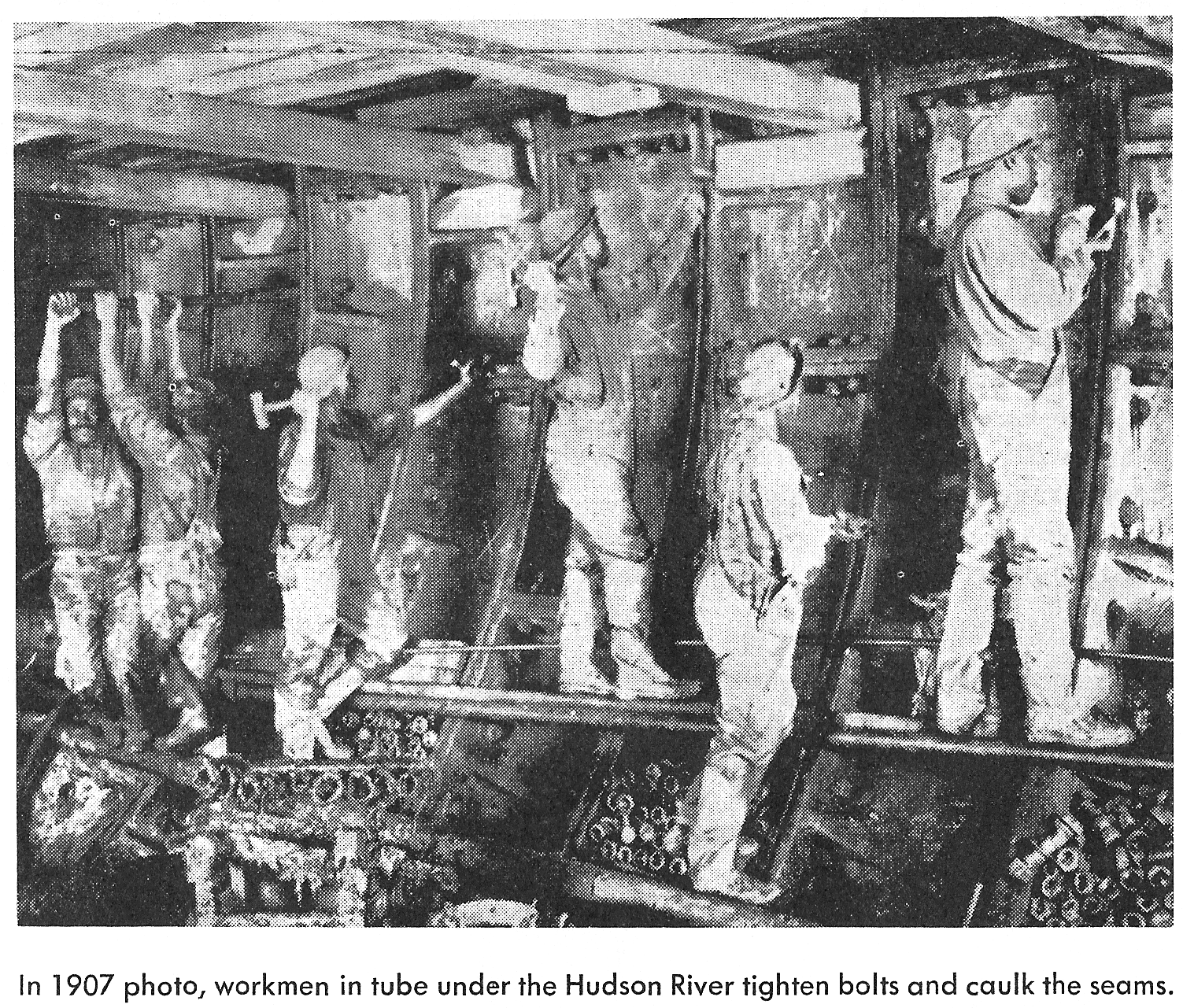
Workers in the North River Tubes tighten bolts and caulk seams in 1907

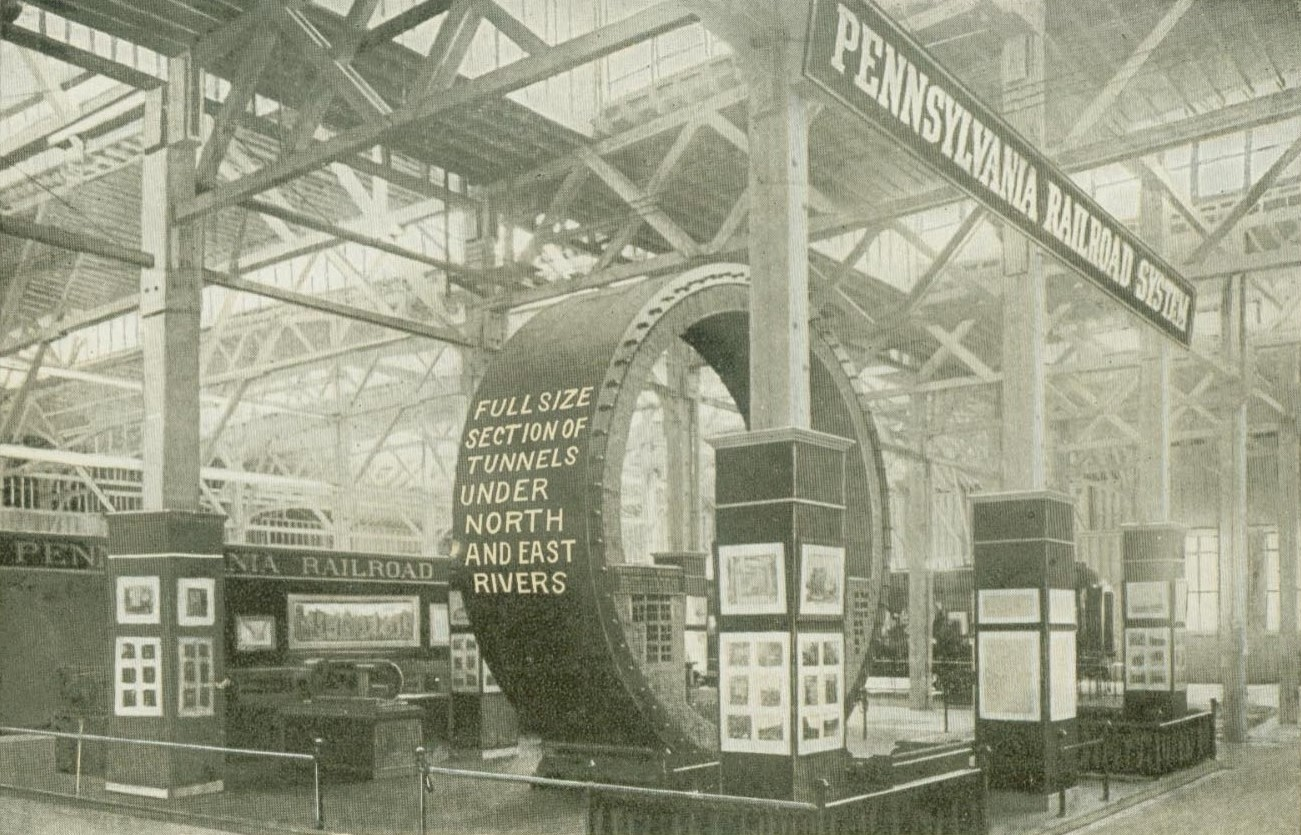
1907 exposition display showing cross-section of North and East River tunnels

The tunnels opened November 27, 1910, when the New York Tunnel Extension to New York Penn Station opened. Until then, PRR trains used the PRR main line to Exchange Place in Jersey City, New Jersey. The New York Tunnel Extension branched off from the original line two miles northeast of Newark, then ran northeast across the Jersey Meadows to the North River Tunnels and New York Penn. The tunnel project included the Portal Bridge over the Hackensack River and the Manhattan Transfer interchange with the Hudson and Manhattan Railroad (now PATH). The opening of the North River Tunnels and Penn Station made the PRR the only railroad with direct access to New York City from the south.

In 1967 the Aldene Plan was implemented, allowing trains of the floundering Central Railroad of New Jersey (CNJ) and Reading (RDG) to run to Newark Penn Station, connecting to PRR and PATH trains to New York. The PRR merged into Penn Central Transportation in 1968. Penn Central went bankrupt in 1970 and in 1976 its suburban trains were taken over by Conrail, then by NJ Transit in 1983. Penn Central long-distance service (including part of today's Northeast Corridor and Empire Corridor) had been taken over by Amtrak in 1971. Amtrak took control of the North River Tunnels in 1976, and NJ Transit started running trains through the tunnels under contract with Amtrak.

== Operation ==
=== Portals ===
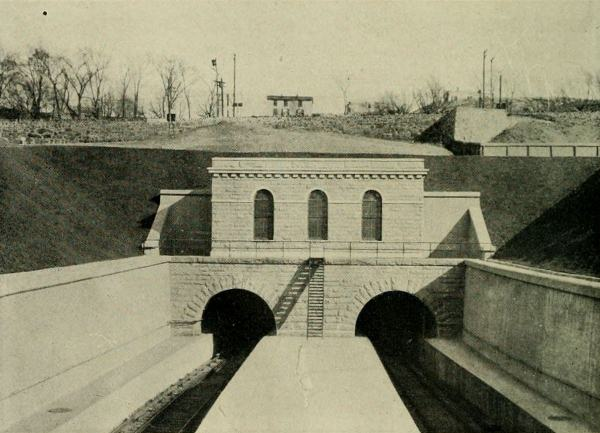
Hackensack portals in 1910

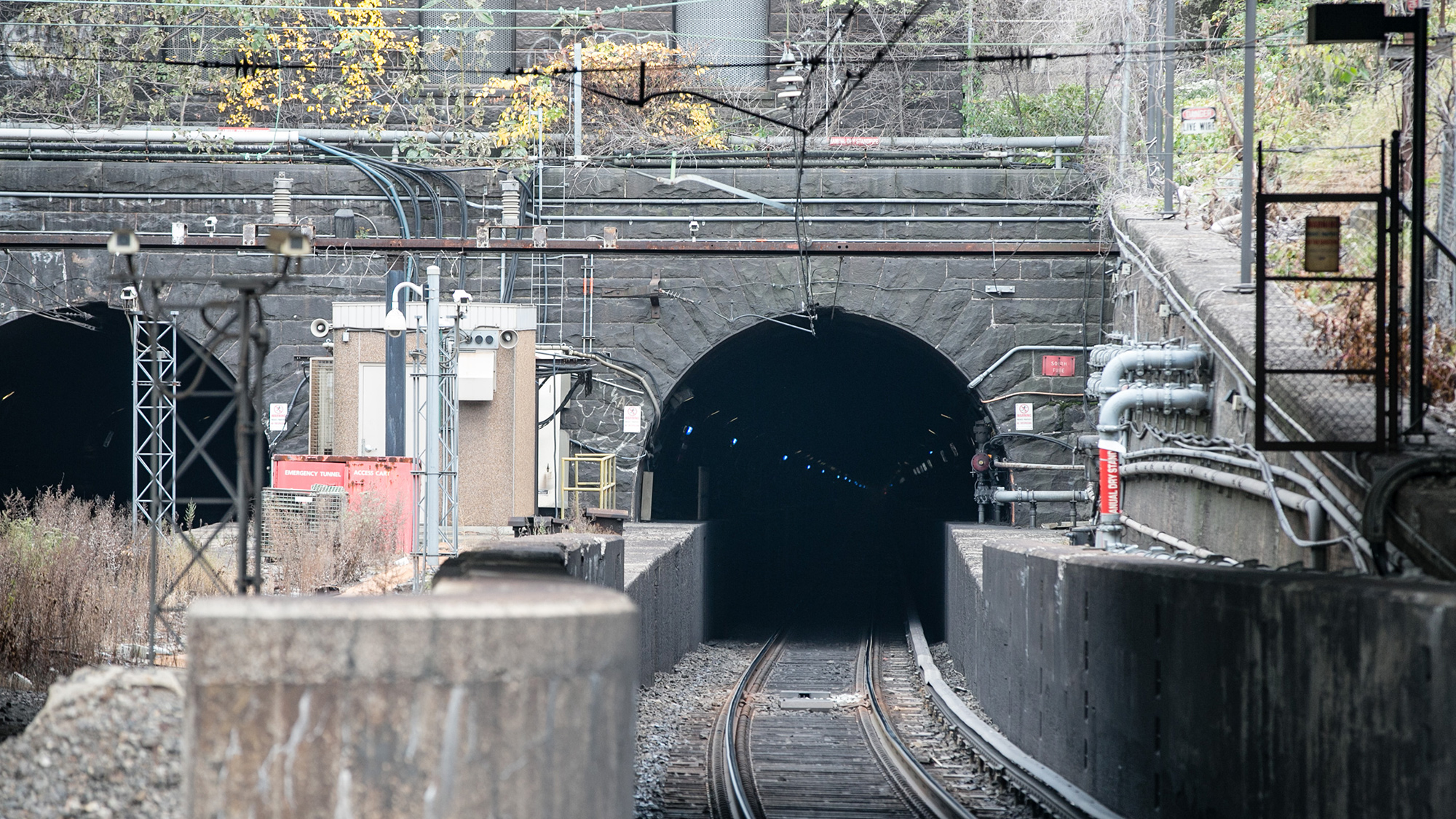
Manhattan Bound Tunnel on the North Bergen side that goes under the Hudson River into New York City's Penn Station in March 2023. After 9/11, security cameras were installed by the portals.

The west portals are in North Bergen, at the west edge of the New Jersey Palisades near the east end of Route 3 at U.S. Route 1/9 (40.7714°N 74.0419°W). They run beneath North Bergen, Union City, and Weehawken, to the east portals at the east edge of 10th Avenue at 32nd Street in Manhattan. When the top of the Weehawken Shaft was covered is a mystery; the two tracks may have remained open to the sky until catenary was added circa 1932. The two portals on the Manhattan side fanned out into 21 tracks just east of 10th Avenue, serving the platforms at Penn Station. 450 West 33rd Street (now Five Manhattan West), on the east side of 10th Avenue, was built above the east portals in 1969.

The two tubes are mostly straight and are 37 feet (11.3 m) apart. There are cross-passages spaced every 300 feet (91 m). At the Manhattan end, each tube splits into several tracks.

=== Capacity ===
The North River Tunnels allow a maximum of 24 crossings per hour each way. Since 2003, the tunnels have operated near capacity during peak hours. The number of NJ Transit weekday trains through the North River Tunnels increased from 147 in 1976 to 438 in 2010. Trains ordinarily travel west (to New Jersey) through the north tube and east through the south. During the busiest hour of morning rush, about 24 trains are scheduled through the south tube, and the same number travel through the north tube in the afternoon.

The tubes run parallel to each other underneath the river; their centers are separated by 37 feet (11 m). The two tracks fan out to 21 tracks just west of Penn Station.

In 2001, Verizon Wireless service was implemented in the tunnels.

== Expansion and restoration proposals ==
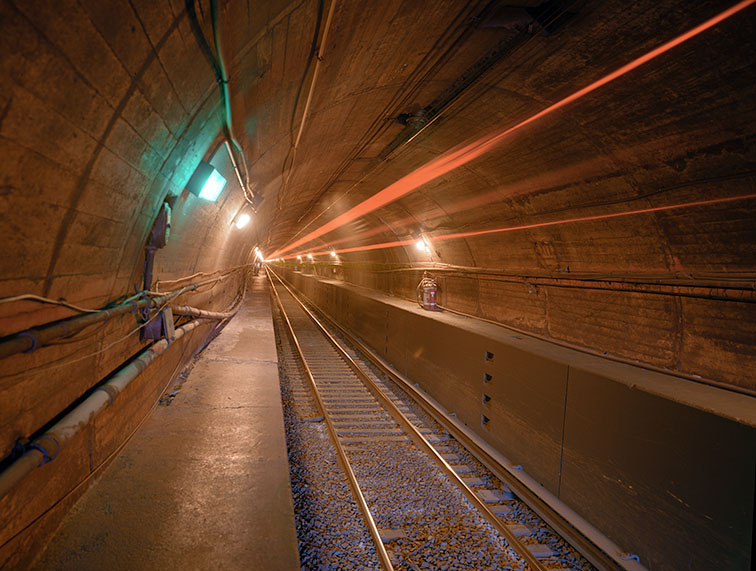
Inside the Manhattan-bound tube that goes under several cities and towns in New Jersey and then under the river into New York Penn Station. Date Unknown.

Beginning in the 1990s several proposals were developed to build additional tunnels under the Hudson, both to add capacity for Northeast Corridor traffic and to allow repairs to be made to the existing deteriorated tunnels. A plan to repair the tunnels and add new tubes was approved in 2021.

=== Access to the Region's Core ===
Access to the Region's Core (ARC), launched in 1995 by the Port Authority of New York and New Jersey (PANYNJ), NJ Transit, and the Metropolitan Transportation Authority, was a Major Investment Study that looked at public transportation ideas for the New York metropolitan area. It found that long-term goals would best be met by better connections to and in-between the region's major rail stations in Midtown Manhattan, Penn Station and Grand Central Terminal. The East Side Access project, which includes tunnels under the East River and the East Side of Manhattan, would divert some LIRR traffic to Grand Central; it was completed in January 2023.

The Trans-Hudson Express Tunnel or THE Tunnel, which later took on the name of the study itself, was meant to address the western, or Hudson River, crossing. Engineering studies determined that structural interferences made a new terminal connected to Grand Central or the current Penn Station unfeasible and its final design involved boring under the current rail yard to a new deep cavern terminal station under 34th Street. Amtrak had acknowledged that the region represented a bottleneck in the national system and had originally planned to complete work by 2040.

The ARC project, which did not include direct Amtrak participation, was cancelled in October 2010 by New Jersey governor Chris Christie, who cited potential cost overruns. Amtrak briefly engaged the governor in attempt to revive the ARC Tunnel and use preliminary work done for it, but those negotiations soon broke down. Amtrak said it was not interested in purchasing any of the work. New Jersey Senator Robert Menendez later said some preparatory work done for ARC may be used for the new project. Costs for the project were $117 million for preliminary engineering, $126 million for final design, $15 million for construction and $178 million real estate property rights ($28 million in New Jersey and $150 million in New York City). Additionally, a $161 million partially refundable pre-payment of insurance premiums was also made. Subsequently, Amtrak's timetable for beginning its trans-Hudson project was advanced. This was in part due to the cancellation of ARC, a project similar in scope, but with differences in design.

=== Gateway Program and Hurricane Sandy ===
Amtrak's plan for a new Trans-Hudson tunnel, the Gateway Program, was unveiled on February 7, 2011, by Amtrak CEO Joseph Boardman and New Jersey Senators Menendez and Frank Lautenberg. The announcement also included endorsements from New York Senator Charles Schumer and Amtrak's Board of Directors. Officials said Amtrak would take the lead in seeking financing; a list of potential sources included the states of New York and New Jersey, the City of New York, the PANYNJ, and the MTA as well as private investors. As of 2017, the Gateway Program is expected to cost $12.9 billion.

In October 2012, a year after the Gateway Program was announced, the North River Tubes were inundated by seawater from Hurricane Sandy, marking the first time in the tunnel's history that both tubes had been completely flooded. The surge damaged overhead wires, electrical systems, concrete bench walls, and drainage systems. As a result of the storm damage and the tunnels' age, component failures within the tubes increased, resulting in frequent delays. One report in 2019 estimated that the North River Tubes and the Portal Bridge, two components that the Gateway Program will replace, contributed to 2,000 hours of delays between 2014 and 2018. After the North River Tunnels were flooded, the Gateway Program was prioritized. In May 2014, Boardman told the Regional Plan Association that there was less than 20 years before one or both of the tunnels would have to be shut down. In July 2017, the draft Environmental Impact Study for the project was issued.

Funding for the Gateway Project had been unclear for several years due to a lack of funding commitments from New Jersey officials and the federal government. In 2015, a Gateway Development Corporation, consisting of members from Amtrak, the Port Authority and USDOT, was created to oversee construction of the Gateway Project. The federal government and the states agreed to split the cost of funding the project. The first administration of President Donald Trump cast doubts about funding for the project, and in December 2017, a Federal Transit Administration official called the previous funding agreement "nonexistent". In March 2018, up to $541 million for the project was provided in the Consolidated Appropriations Act. On June 24, 2019, the state governments of New York and New Jersey passed legislation to create the bi-state Gateway Development Commission, whose job it is to oversee the planning, funding and construction of the rail tunnels and bridges of Gateway Program. In February 2020, Amtrak indicated that it would go forward with the renovation of the North River Tunnels regardless of the Gateway Program's status.

On May 28, 2021, the project was formally approved by USDOT, with funding still to be determined. On August 31, 2022, the Gateway Development Commission announced that the new tunnels would be completed in 2035 and that the existing North River Tunnels will be rehabilitated by 2038. The project will use federal funding from the Infrastructure Investment and Jobs Act, with the balance provided by the states of New Jersey and New York.

==== Service and repair plans ====
When the new Gateway Program tunnels are built, the two North River Tunnels will close for repairs, one at a time, with the existing level of service maintained. The North River Tubes and the Gateway Program tunnels would both be able to carry a maximum of 24 trains per hour. Capacity on the line will be doubled after rehabilitation of the old tunnels is complete. The Hudson Tunnel Project will improve resiliency on the Northeast Corridor, making service along the line more reliable with redundant capacity.

The existing North River Tunnels can carry a maximum of 24 trains per hour in each direction. If the new Hudson Tunnel is not built, the North River Tunnels will have to be closed one at a time, reducing weekday service below the existing level of 24 trains per hour. Due to the need to provide two-way service on a single track, service would be reduced by over 50 percent. In the best-case scenario, with perfect operating conditions, 9 trains per hour could be provided through the existing North River Tunnels, or a 63% reduction in service. During the duration of construction, passengers would have to use overcrowded PATH trains, buses, and ferries to get between New Jersey and New York. On the other hand, if the new Gateway tunnel is built, it would allow an additional 24 trains per hour to travel under the Hudson River, supplementing the 24 trains per hour that could use the existing North River tubes.

== See also ==
- Bergen Hill
- Bergen Tunnels
- East River Tunnels
- List of bridges, tunnels, and cuts in Hudson County, New Jersey
- List of ferries across the Hudson River in New York City
- List of fixed crossings of the Hudson River (bridges and tunnels)
- Uptown Hudson Tubes (PATH transit tunnels, opened 1908)
