= Subway =

Subway most commonly refers to:

- Rapid transit, a type of rail transportation
- Subway (restaurant), an American fast-food chain that primarily sells submarine sandwiches

Subway, Subways, The Subway, or The Subways may also refer to:

== Transportation ==
- Subway (underpass), a type of walkway that passes underneath an obstacle
- Subway (George Bush Intercontinental Airport), a people mover in Houston, Texas, United States

== Entertainment ==
=== Film ===
- Subway (film), a 1985 French thriller film

=== Television ===
- "Subway" (Homicide: Life on the Street), a television episode
- "The Subway" (Seinfeld), a television episode

=== Music ===
- Subway (group), an American band
- The Subways, an English rock band
  - The Subways (album), their self-titled debut album
- "Subways" (song), by the Avalanches
- "Subway", a song by Aṣa from her self-titled album Aṣa
- "Subway", a song by the Bee Gees on their album Children of the World
- "The Subway" (song), by Chappell Roan

== Other uses ==
- The Subway (Zion National Park), a slot canyon in Utah, United States
