= Tunnel effect =

Phenomenon in psychology

In experimental psychology, the tunnel effect is the perception as a single object moving beyond an occluding object and then reappearing after a suitable amount of time on the other side of it. This phenomenon has been studied by Burke (1952), who discovered that the optimal amount of time for giving the impression of a single object is shorter than what is actually needed to cross the occlusion at that speed.

Another use of the term "tunnel effect", when talking about long stretches of road, refers to the environment surrounding the driver that begins to merge towards the central point of the horizon. This effect can be noted at high speeds, when driving on straight smooth roads. The effect is amplified if the environment surrounding is monotonous. The "tunnelling effect" can cause nausea and confusion to drivers as well as letting fatigue settle in at a higher rate, making it one major cause in sleep related accidents.
