= Access to the Region's Core =

Canceled commuter-rail project

ARC Tunnel
- Interactive map of ARC Tunnel

Overview
- Location: Hudson Palisades/Hudson River
- Coordinates: 40.75479°N 74.01677°W
- Status: Canceled as of October 2010
- System: New Jersey Transit Rail Operations
- Start: North Bergen, New Jersey
- End: New York City

Operation
- Work began: June 2009
- Operator: New Jersey Transit
- Traffic: Train
- Character: Passenger

Technical
- No. of tracks: 2 single-track tubes
- Track gauge: 1,435 mm (4 ft 8 1/2 in) standard gauge
- Electrified: 12 kV overhead catenary
- Min elevation: 100 ft (30.5 m) below river level 200 ft (61 m) average depth in Palisades portion
- Tunnel clearance: 24.5 ft (7.5 m)
- Grade: 0.3 – 0.8%

Access to the Region's Core (ARC) was a proposed commuter-rail project to increase passenger service capacity on New Jersey Transit (NJT) between Secaucus Junction in New Jersey and Manhattan in New York City. New infrastructure would have included new trackage, a new rail yard, and a tunnel under the Hudson River. A new station adjacent to New York Penn Station was to be constructed as running more trains into the current station was deemed unfeasible. An estimated budget for the project was $8.7 billion. Construction began in mid-2009 and the project was slated for completion in 2018, but it was cancelled in October 2010 by Chris Christie, the governor of New Jersey, who cited the possibility of cost overruns and the state's lack of funds. Six hundred million dollars had been spent on the project. The decision remains controversial.

After its cancellation, the federal government demanded repayment of funding received by NJT for the project. The Christie administration engaged a law firm to present its arguments for non-payment, which were subsequently rejected by the Federal Transit Administration. An agreement was eventually reached in which part of the funds would be returned while other monies would be used on transit-related projects. Soon after work was halted, there was speculation that the previously discussed idea of the New York City Transit Authority's 7 Subway Extension continuing into New Jersey would be revived, but was later scuttled.

In February 2011, Amtrak announced the Gateway Project, a plan to build a right of way and new tunnels from Newark Penn Station to New York Penn Station, passing through Secaucus Junction, which would be shared with NJT trains. Christie later directed PANYNJ funding toward New Jersey road projects. A March 2012 Government Accountability Office investigated the decision to cancel the project and provided comments that questioned Christie's rationale. Manhattan District Attorney Cyrus Vance, Jr. and Securities and Exchange Commission conducted investigations into possible misuse of PANYNJ funds towards projects involving roadways possibly not under the agency's purview, such as the Pulaski Skyway. Eventually $400,000 in fines were paid.

== Overview ==
=== Infrastructure ===
NJT ARC Project Definition Report EPE update Rev.3 2008 08

The project would have more than doubled the number of trains from New Jersey to Midtown Manhattan, providing direct, one-seat service from most of New Jersey Transit's rail lines, as well as more frequent service to in-state destinations. The improvement would have included the construction of two new rail tunnels under the Hudson River as a supplement to the North River Tunnels, which operate at 100% capacity. The new tunnels would have connected to a six-track, state-of-the-art construction of a new station under 34th Street east of the existing Penn Station with pedestrian connections to the existing station and the Eighth, Seventh, Sixth Avenue, and Broadway lines of the New York City Subway. Also planned were a new rail loop near the Frank R. Lautenberg Secaucus Junction Station allowing Main Line/Bergen County Line and Pascack Valley Line trains direct service to Midtown, and a new mid-day rail storage yard in the Kearny Meadows. While the terminal station would have dead-ended trains, there was hope that it would one day be extended eastward depending on future funding. (Note: For a very detailed discussion of the project scope see the project definition report produced by the project in 2008 and the updated report issued later that same year.)

=== Cost and funding ===
2009 Federal Transit Administration projections for the cost of the ARC tunnel. Later increases in projected costs, which would have to be assumed by the State of New Jersey, led Governor Chris Christie to cancel the project.
1. New Starts — $3.0B (34.5%)
2. Port Authority — $3.0B (34.5%)
3. CMAQ & FHWA — $1.32B (15.2%)
4. NJ Turnpike — $1.25B (14.4%)
5. ARRA — $0.13B (1.50%)

The Federal Transit Administration (FTA) projected the cost for ARC as $8.7 billion in their 2009 Annual Report on Funding Recommendations for the New Starts Program, which identified the funding for the project as follows.

- Federal New Starts = $3.0 billion
- Federal American Recovery & Reinvestment Act = $0.130 billion
- Federal Congestion Mitigation & Air Quality Improvement (CMAQ) Program & Federal Highway Administration (FHWA) = $1.320 billion
- Port Authority of New York and New Jersey = $3.0 billion
- New Jersey Turnpike Authority = $1.250 billion

Projections rose to close to $11 billion by the time of the cancellation of New Jersey's funding of the project It is estimated that $610 million has been spent on the project. Before being terminated, the Port Authority had purchased, or otherwise acquired rights or leased land on Manhattan's West Side. About $250 million was spent on studies and design. Condemnation procedures initiated by the state for properties along the route in Hudson County were left pending at various stages after the cancellation.

Christie later directed that funding be directed to road projects. In March 2011 the PANYNJ agreed to redirect $1.8 billion earmarked for the project to repairs to road and bridges in Hudson County that it saw as part of the larger network of the distribution system in the Port of New York and New Jersey. In September 2011, the Turnpike Authority voted to spend the funds committed to the project on roads within the state.

== Project history ==
=== Design ===
In 1995, the ARC project began with the initiation of the Access to the Region's Core Major Investment Study (MIS) in which an initial list of 137 alternatives was identified, including bus, light rail, subway, Port Authority Trans-Hudson (PATH) rail, commuter rail, ferry, new technologies, and auto. This Major Investment Study was completed in 2003, and recommended two alternatives for advancement into a Draft Environmental Impact Statement. Alternative P would create new tracks and platforms under the existing Penn Station. Alternative S would create a new rail link to existing Penn Station as well as new East River Tunnels to expanded rail storage facilities at Sunnyside Yard. Alternative G would have provided a link to Grand Central Terminal, but that alternative was not recommended for further advancement.

The environmental review stage lasted from 2003 to 2009. In the very early stages of the project, there were plans for track connections from the new tunnels to existing Penn Station, the Penn Station Connector, which would have provided NJ Transit and Amtrak with the operational flexibility to use either the existing rail tunnels or the new ARC tunnels. In order to achieve a less than two percent grade from the low point in the tunnel under the river to Penn Station, the Penn Station Connector would have to diverge from the new ARC tunnels somewhere under the Hudson River. This would have required approval by the United States Environmental Protection Agency and the United States Coast Guard to allow construction of a very large, expensive cofferdam mid-river. Regulatory approvals seemed unlikely; construction of the cofferdam would have disrupted the contaminated river bottom, which was previously declared a Superfund site and would have obstructed busy river shipping channels. In addition to Hudson River impacts, the Penn Station Connector would have required excavation of a wide trench across Manhattan's West Side. Known as cut and cover tunneling construction, this wide trench would have displaced many businesses and residents and required unlikely support from the Hudson River Park Trust, Community Boards, and other stakeholder organizations.

After the initial engineering and expert peer review in 2006 and 2007, NJ Transit determined that moving the station deeper and using modern tunnel boring techniques was the only way to avoid environmental, community, and engineering concerns. The agency opted to construct an underground terminal, which later became a source of controversy.

Design and construction management contracts were awarded respectively to THE Partnership, a joint venture of Parsons Brinckerhoff, STV, and DMJM Harris/AECOM, and CM Consortium, a joint venture of Tishman, Parsons Corp. and ARUP, both in 2006.

In July 2006, the Federal Transit Administration (FTA) announced its decision to allow preliminary engineering to begin on the new trans-Hudson rail tunnel. Supporters called the FTA's announcement a positive sign that the federal government eventually intended to commit funding to the project. The FTA approved the Draft Environmental Impact Statement (DEIS) for the project in January 2007, and the Supplemental Draft Environmental Impact Statement (SDEIS) in March 2008. The SDEIS identified and evaluated the environmental impacts of a deeper profile tunnel with no track connections to existing Penn Station. These changes to the project scope were necessitated by a significant number of environmental, community, and engineering concerns regarding construction of the previous shallow tunnel and station. The Final Environmental Impact Statement (FEIS) was approved in October 2008. In January 2009, the FTA issued the Record of Decision for the project and approved the start of final design.

=== Beginning of construction ===
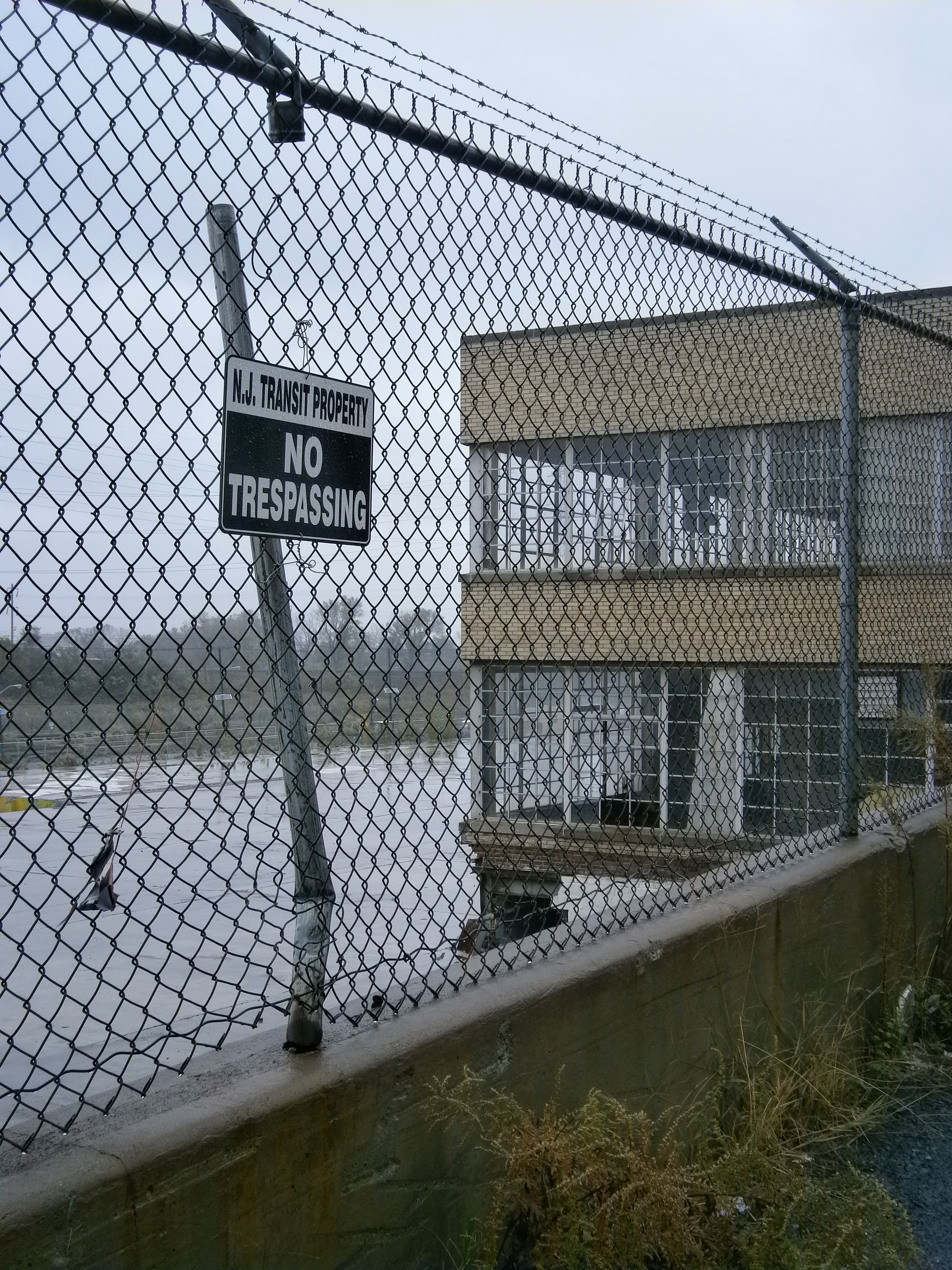
Factory and grounds at site of western portal of tunnel in North Bergen, now owned by NJT

The first construction contract was awarded to construct a new railroad underpass at Tonnelle Avenue in North Bergen in June 2009, and the project's groundbreaking was held on June 8, 2009. The Palisades Tunnels construction contract, the first major tunneling contract for the project was awarded on May 5, 2010.

=== Cancellation ===
Governor Christie endorsed the project in April 2010, but his support for the project was later called into question. On September 10, 2010, with final design and construction on the first two contracts was already underway, NJ Transit's executive director, James Weinstein, ordered work on the tunnel to be suspended for 30 days for a 30-day risk review of the project's cost and schedule, because of concerns that the project would go $1 billion over budget which the State of New Jersey could not afford to pay. News reports mentioned the possibility that Governor Christie's administration was considering scrapping the project to use the project's funding to replenish New Jersey's Transportation Trust Fund, however New Jersey's Transportation Commissioner James S. Simpson denied that the Administration ever contemplated such a possibility.

On October 7, 2010, New Jersey governor Chris Christie announced that the ARC Tunnel project was officially cancelled, citing rising costs and concerns over New Jersey residents fronting the bill for the estimated $15 billion project. The next day the governor agreed to a two-week reprieve, so that additional options for funding the tunnel could be developed. Christie did briefly reconsider, reviewing options in discussions with US Secretary of Transportation Ray LaHood, but made a final decision to terminate the project on October 27, 2010.

At the time of cancellation, construction was already underway on the Tonnelle Avenue Underpass and the Palisades Tunnels, one of the project's three tunnel segments in the project. The construction contract for the Manhattan Tunnels was pending award to Barnard-Judlau JV. The Hudson River Tunnels, the third and final tunnel construction contract, was in the procurement phase.

== Funding repayment controversy ==
The cancellation forfeited federal funding for the project, and put into question the use of Port Authority money. In November 2010, U.S. Secretary of Transportation Ray LaHood agreed to an arrangement proposed by New Jersey's congressional delegation in which the state would return $271 million already received for the project and the federal DOT would in turn put $128 million into the state's Congestion Mitigation Air Quality account to be used on future projects. The Christie administration did not accept the offer.

The federal government then demanded total repayment by New Jersey of federal grants, as stipulated under federal law. The Christie administration has refused to repay and is involved in legal proceedings to avoid doing so. The Federal Transit Administration requested that the state repay $271,101,291 by December 24, 2010. New Jersey hired the Washington, D.C. law firm Patton Boggs to argue against the repayment. As of April 2011, Patton Boggs had billed the state $803,000 in legal fees. In a letter to New Jersey U.S. senators and congressional representatives, Secretary LaHood wrote that the state was liable for the money, and that non-payment could result in the withholding of federal funding for other projects.

On April 29, 2011, a Federal Transit Administration ruling rejected New Jersey's arguments on the repayment of the funds. The debt carries an interest rate of 1% per year, and began to accrue on that date at a rate of approximately $225,000 per month. Christie vowed that he would contest in the decision in court.

In September 2011, FTA and NJT reached a deal whereby $95 million would be paid back. The agreement waived $2.7 million in penalties and interest and stipulated that $128 million would be spent on DOT-approved transit-related projects. While the $95 million taken as loss in 2011, the re-payment schedule will be $19 million per year for five years.

== NJT costs, litigation, and settlements ==
In June 2010, a $162.7 million insurance premium payment was made by NJT when the project started, $144.5 million of which was reimbursed. The remaining $18,208,603 was used to cover the cost of insurance coverage for the project until it was shut down.

In October 2012, in an eminent domain case for a property in Weehawken that lies in the path of the tunnel, NJT was ordered to pay $8.5 million for the parcel. The amount was contested and reduced to $6.13 million.

The agency also agreed to a $5.6 million settlement with a construction company, Barnard/Judlau Joint Venture, for previously completed work final design plans, drawings and reports.

== Government Accountability Office report ==
In March 2012, the Government Accountability Office (GAO), a federal agency, published a report entitled Commuter Rail Potential Impacts and Cost Estimates for the Cancelled Hudson River Tunnel Project, which concluded that Christie's basis for cancellation was a misrepresentation and that he misstated the estimated costs, cost over-runs, and New Jersey's obligation to pay them.

It found that no agreement had been made as to who was responsible for cost over-runs, which Christie claimed were NJ's responsibility. While he had suggested that the project would cost up to $14 billion, NJ state officials stated that in their estimation before the cancellation it would cost around $10 billion. The report concluded that New Jersey would have been responsible for 14.4% of the costs of project, and that Christie's claim of 70% included funds committed by the PANYNJ (a bi-state agency) and a $775 million contribution to the rebuilding of the Portal Bridge, which was not in the scope of ARC project. New Jersey's funds earmarked for ARC were eventually diverted to the state transportation trust, normally funded by a gasoline tax, one of the lowest in the United States.

== NJ Legislature, Manhattan District Attorney and SEC investigations ==
In a controversial move in 2011, Governor Chris Christie directed the PANYNJ to divert money originally earmarked for ARC to highway projects. The agency agreed to pay $1.8 billion to partially fund efforts to rehabilitate the Pulaski Skyway and Route 139, replace Wittpenn Bridge, and extend Route 1&9T, all part of the larger distribution network in the Port of New York and New Jersey. A 2014 article in WNYC claimed: "According to documents and interviews with more than a dozen top-level sources, the governor made clear from the get-go that the agency would be the source of cash for New Jersey's hard-up infrastructure budget. And he and his team proceeded to wrangle billions from the bi-state authority to further his political goals — much of that for projects that had never been under the Port Authority's jurisdiction before.

In February 2014, a special joint committee of the New Jersey Legislature investigating the Fort Lee lane closure scandal subpoenaed the PANYNJ for documents related to the ARC project, specifically with regard to projected cost overruns and to discussions related to Christie's appointments to the agency.

In March 2014, Manhattan District Attorney Cyrus Vance, Jr. subpoenaed records from the PANYNJ seeking correspondence among authority officials and Christie's administration regarding projects such as the rebuilding of the World Trade Center site and the PATH transportation hub in lower Manhattan. Vance's office has conducted interviews about the agency's funding of reconstruction of the Pulaski Skyway. As the Port Authority's jurisdiction includes access roads to the Lincoln Tunnel but not the Holland Tunnel, the Christie administration allegedly pressured the Port Authority to classify the Skyway as an access route to the Lincoln Tunnel.

In April 2014, media reported that lawyers from the New York office of the Securities and Exchange Commission were working with the Manhattan DA's office in a joint probe into the possible misuse of Port Authority funds. NJ State Senator Ray Lesniak reportedly had sent a letter to the SEC and the Internal Revenue Service calling for an investigation into whether the diversion of money to New Jersey roads may have violated securities or tax laws. The SEC ultimately fined the PANYNJ $400,000. The PANYNJ conceded that it had acted negligently. The investigation also revealed that the Christie administration had already eyed the money prior to announcing the cancelation of the project in order to prevent a transportation funding crisis in NJ.

== Alternatives ==
=== Gateway Project ===
In February 2011 Amtrak announced its intention to build a small segment of a high-speed rail corridor called the Gateway Project to also be used by New Jersey Transit. While Amtrak acknowledged that the region represented a bottleneck in the national system, its timetable for beginning the project was advanced in part due to ARC's cancellation. The project is similar in scope, but passengers travelling from Bergen, Passaic, Rockland, and Orange counties will still require a transfer at Secaucus Junction. Rather than a deep cavern station, a new southern terminal annex, considered more integral to an expanded New York Penn Station complex, will be built. A track from the new tunnel will also connect to the existing Penn Station, allowing for use by Amtrak's Northeast Corridor through-service trains.

On May 28, 2021, the project was formally approved by the federal government; the Gateway Development Commission announced that the new tunnels would be completed in 2035 at a cost of $16.1 billion. The first contracts for the project were awarded in September 2023.

=== New York City Subway extension ===
In 2015, 7 and <7> service was extended from Times Square to 34th Street, on a route partially parallel to the Hudson River

On November 16, 2010, The New York Times reported that New York City Mayor Michael Bloomberg's administration was working on a plan in lieu of the ARC tunnel, to extend the IRT Flushing Line of the New York City Subway to Secaucus Junction. This revived previous discussions about the possible extension that were not pursued given New Jerseyans presumed preference for a "one seat ride" into Manhattan. Construction on the 7 Subway Extension saw the line extended southwest from Times Square – 42nd Street to the 34th Street – Hudson Yards station, which opened on September 13, 2015. The new station is near the Hudson Yards Redevelopment Project site and Jacob K. Javits Convention Center, one block from the Hudson River.

If built, the extension would take the New York City Subway outside the city's borders for the first time. It would offer a direct rail access from New Jersey to Times Square, Grand Central Terminal, and Queens as well as connections with most other subway routes.

A subway extension would cost less than the ARC tunnel, as its eastern end would be the new subway station at Eleventh Avenue, avoiding the expensive tunnel boring work east to Herald Square. Travel times into Manhattan could be longer than under the original ARC proposal, because riders would need to transfer to the subway from New Jersey Transit trains at Secaucus. On the other hand, riders would gain direct access to Grand Central Terminal on the east side of Manhattan. This was one of the original key goals of the ARC project that the final ARC proposal didn't satisfy. The 7 route might not have the same capacity as the ARC tunnel, as trains would not be arriving at a terminal station with multiple platforms. Bloomberg had not discussed the project with either New York Governor Andrew Cuomo or Christie, and it would not automatically receive the federal funds allotted to the ARC tunnel. Christie stated that he would be open to the discussion.

On February 2, 2011, the city's Economic Development Corporation voted to budget up to $250,000 for a feasibility study of a tunnel for the subway line extension awarded to Parsons Brinckerhoff, a major engineering firm that was working on the ARC tunnel. The report was released in April 2013. The proposal includes the construction of the in-fill station at 10th Avenue, tunnels running along the path of the ARC tunnel, and a multi-level multi-modal addition to Secaucus Junction. A widening of the right-of way of the Northeast Corridor was considered. The study revived hope for the project, with Mayor Bloomberg saying "Extending the 7 train to Secaucus is a promising potential solution ... and is deserving of serious consideration." Citing budget considerations, the director of the MTA, Joe Lhota, said that it was doubtful the extension would be built in the foreseeable future.

In a November 2013 Daily News opinion article, the president of the Real Estate Board of New York and the chairman of Edison Properties called for the line to be extended to Secaucus in tunnels to be shared with the Gateway Project. Later in November 2013 the New Jersey Assembly passed a Resolution 168 supporting the extension of the line to Hoboken and Secaucus. An economic impact study by the Meadowlands Chamber of Commerce is expected to be released in spring 2015.

== See also ==
- Empire Connection
- Florida high speed rail
- List of ferries across the Hudson River in New York City
- List of fixed crossings of the Hudson River (bridges and tunnels)
