= Court Street Bridge (Hackensack River) =

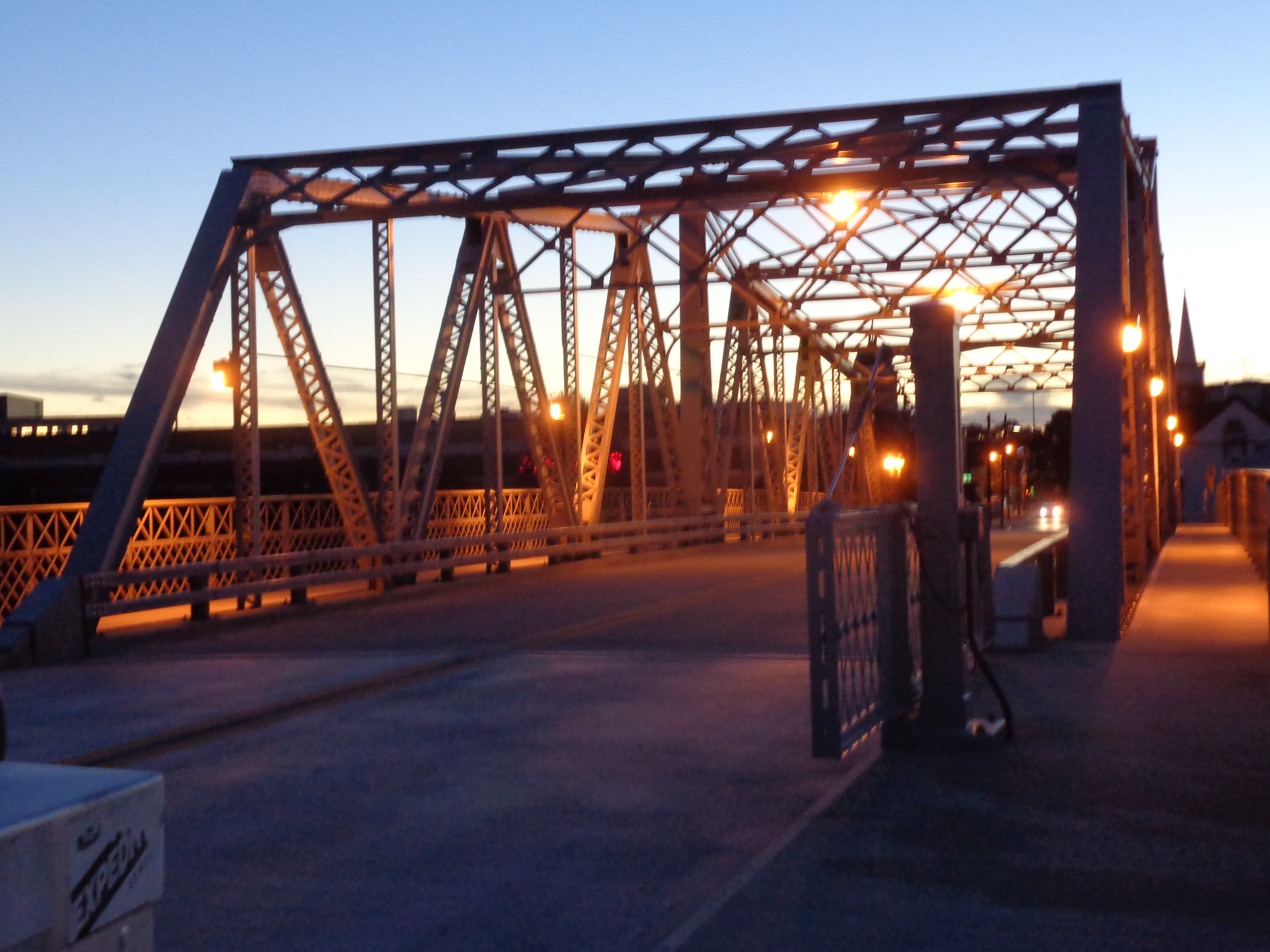
- Coordinates: 40.87907°N 74.03946°W
- Carries: Court Street; West Fort Lee Road
- Crosses: Hackensack River
- Locale: Hackensack and Bogota, New Jersey
- Other name: Harold J. Dillard Memorial Bridge
- Owner: Bergen County

Characteristics
- Design: Swing
- Material: Steel
- Total length: 317 ft (97 m)
- Width: 27.5 ft (8.4 m)
- Longest span: 88.9 ft (27.1 m)
- No. of spans: 3
- Clearance above: 13.2 ft (4.0 m)
- Clearance below: 3 ft (0.91 m) mean high water 8 ft (2.4 m) mean low water

History
- Designer: R. Earle
- Constructed by: R.F. Long and Company
- Construction start: 1907
- Construction end: 1908
- Opened: 1908

Statistics
- Daily traffic: 9,000

Location
- Interactive map of Court Street Bridge

The Court Street Bridge, also known as the Harold J. Dillard Memorial Bridge, is a vehicular movable bridge crossing the Hackensack River between Hackensack and Bogota in Bergen County, New Jersey, which owns it. Located 16.2 miles (26.1 km) from the river mouth at Newark Bay, the swing bridge, which opened in 1908 and underwent major rehabilitation in 2010–2012, is the most-upstream bridge on the river required by federal regulations to open on request.

== Background and environs ==
Originally the territory of the Hackensack tribe, the earliest European settlement near the site of the bridge was in 1641 at Achter Col, a short lived factorij (trading post) in what is now Bogota. Hackensack became the county seat of Bergen in the early 1700s. A bridge at Old Bridge and later at New Bridge Landing and a ferry at Little Ferry were crossings created during the colonial era. The river later was at one time a major commercial waterway within the Port of New York and New Jersey. The historic center of the town at the Green, site of the First Dutch Reformed Church is near the west end of the bridge. Government and administrative offices, including the Bergen County Court House, are also nearby. The New Jersey Naval Museum, home of the submarine USS Ling, is located on the west bank just upstream of the bridge.

Court Street Bridge is one of several bridges over the river in Hackensack, including Anderson Street Bridge, Midtown Bridge and those that carry Interstate 80 and Route 4.

== Design and historical significance ==
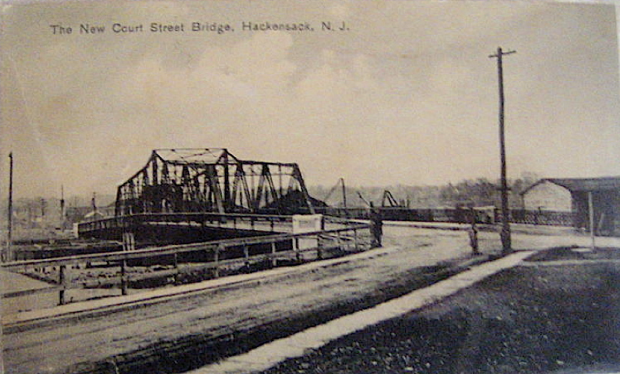
Court Street Bridge 1910

The Court Street Bridge is a center-bearing swing span Warren through truss bridge with two steel deck girder approach spans supported on a concrete substructure. A 1991–94 New Jersey Department of Transportation statewide survey of bridges states: "The riveted through truss bridge is one of several swing-span crossings of the Hackensack River, an important navigable waterway instrumental in the growth and industrial development of Bergen County. Constructed in 1907, the span replaced an earlier swing-span bridge. The builder, F.R. Long Company, was a New York firm that was a prolific bridge contractor in Bergen County, and it incorporated in New Jersey in 1899 moving its major operations to Hackensack at a site adjacent to the bridge. Although the span has undergone some alterations, it is a well-preserved and operational example of the swing-span trusses over the Hackensack River built by a prominent contractor in Bergen County".

In 1998, the New Jersey State Historic Preservation Office identified the bridge (ID#4555) as eligible for listing on the state and federal registers of historic places.

== Dedication ==
Harold J. "Duke" Dillard had been a Hackensack High School star athlete. At the age of 20, the decorated lance corporal became the city's first casualty in the Vietnam War when he was killed by artillery fire in battle on May 25, 1967. The bridge was named in his honor a few years later. At re-dedication ceremonies held in 2011, a new plaque placed in his memory was unveiled on the newly reconstructed bridge.

== Rehabilitation and operations ==
Court Street Bridge is located near the county seat of Bergen and the New Jersey Naval Museum

Major repairs to the bridge were conducted in 1950 and 1974. The timber fenders at the swing-span piers have been reconstructed several times. In 1950 the original concrete jack arch deck was replaced with a reinforced slab and the stringers were encased. In 1974 the truss lower chord was reinforced for its full length, plates were added at the bottom flanges of the end floor beams, and new stringer seat angle connections were added at the floor beams. While the original decorative metal railings were left intact on the approach spans, chain-link fences were placed along the sidewalks on the swing span. While the bridge once had a load-carrying capacity of 20 tons, it was later limited to 3 tons because of rust and corrosion.

As of 2010, approximately 9,000 motor vehicles crossed the Court Street Bridge annually. The bridge was closed for 26 months for rehabilitation in 2010–2012, and has almost entirely been reconstructed. Its substructure, including abutments and piers, as well as electric mechanisms for the swing span, were replaced. The original trusses were restored to maintain the bridge's historic appearance. The project was largely funded through the American Recovery and Reinvestment Act of 2009. which provided $17.2 million for the $19.8 million project.

Court Street Bridge is the most upstream bridge over the Hackensack River required by federal regulations to open on request. In 1999, the Code of Federal Regulations regarding bridge openings were changed at the request of Bergen County to require the bridge to open within four hours of a request, which had not occurred since 1994. The decision to re-build the bridge was a matter of controversy since it is unlikely that a request will be forthcoming. Freshwater flow in the Hackensack has been considerably altered by the Oradell Dam. The river has only been channelized to a point at the Riverbend in Hudson County. The accumulation of silt near the bridge affords navigation only for small boats. The fate of USS Ling may ultimately be connected to the ability for it to be moved from its location just north, or upstream, of the bridge.

== See also ==
- List of crossings of the Hackensack River
- List of crossings of the Lower Passaic River
