= Anderson Street Bridge (Hackensack River) =

- Coordinates: 40.891975°N 74.036288°W
- Carries: CR 60
- Crosses: Hackensack River
- Locale: Hackensack and Teaneck, New Jersey
- Other name(s): Cedar Lane Bridge
- Owner: Bergen County

Characteristics
- Design: box girder
- Material: Steel concrete
- Total length: 304.1 ft (92.7 m)
- Width: 72.42 ft (22.07 m)
- Longest span: 48.9 ft (14.9 m)
- No. of spans: 6
- Clearance above: N/A
- Clearance below: 8.9 ft (2.7 m) mean

History
- Construction end: 1971
- Closed: 2012 (partial); 2016 (eastbound)

The Anderson Street Bridge, also known as the Cedar Lane Bridge, is a fixed-span road bridge over the Hackensack River in Hackensack and Teaneck in Bergen County, New Jersey, U.S. The crossing was built in 1971 to replace an earlier structure. Being structurally deficient, the bridge was given weight restrictions in 2012 and was partially closed in 2016 for interim repairs. It is one of several bridges over the river in Hackensack, including the Court Street Bridge, the Midtown Bridge, and those that carry Interstate 80 and Route 4.

== Earlier crossings ==
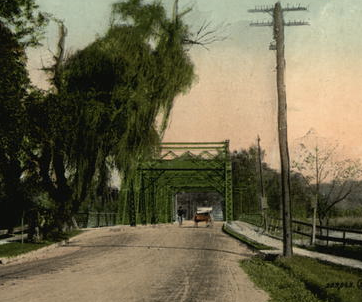

Records indicate that a wooden bridge was built on the site in 1858 and replaced by a new crossing in the early 20th century.

== Weight limitations and reconstruction ==
In 2012 due to structural deficiencies, the bridge was limited to vehicles of less than 15 tons, and two outer lanes were closed, thus precipitating the re-routing of more than 400 weekday bus trips, affecting New Jersey Transit bus routes 83, 157, 168, 175, 178, 182, 751, 753, 755, 772, and 780.

In 2016, eastbound lanes were closed for interim repairs until such time as it can be permanently repaired or replaced.

In 2017, the North Jersey Transportation Planning Authority (NJTPA) allocated $432,000 for a study to consider reconstruction or replacement of the bridge, to take place in 2018. Replacement of the failing bridge remains unfunded. As of 2020, it remained NJTPA concern. After the November 2021 passage of the Infrastructure Investment and Jobs Act, New Jersey officials announced on January 18, 2022, that funding from the bill would be used to fund $40 million of improvements to the bridge, with construction slated to start in 2023 and finish three years later.

In February 2024, plans were announced under which the two sides would be replaced one after the other, with one lane of traffic available in each direction while the other side of the bridge is demolished and reconstructed.

== See also ==
- List of crossings of the Hackensack River
- List of county routes in Bergen County, New Jersey
- Anderson Street station
- Hackensack Bus Terminal
