= Rich LeFurgy =

American investor

- Born: c. 1956 (age 69–70); Hackensack, New Jersey, United States
- Education: Syracuse University
- Occupations: Advertising consultant, investor
- Years active: 1978 – Present
- Known for: Pioneer of internet advertising standards
- Board member of: Founding chairman Interactive Advertising Bureau, ex officio board member, PlaceCast, and ad:tech
- Website: www.archeradvisors.com

Rich LeFurgy (born c. 1956) is an American advertising consultant and investor. The founding chairman of the Interactive Advertising Bureau, he left a senior position at a Madison Avenue agency in 1995, becoming one of the first advertising executives to shift from traditional to digital media.

Described as the "godfather of internet advertising standards," LeFurgy was central to the development and adoption of the standards that guide online advertising.

== Early life and education ==
LeFurgy was born in Hackensack, New Jersey, the son of Priscilla and Francis LeFurgy, an insurance broker. As a student at Edgemont High School, he was interested in computers and CB radios and was active in REACT, a volunteer organization that provided emergency assistance in response to CB radio communications.

LeFurgy attended the S.I. Newhouse School of Public Communications at Syracuse University. He graduated in 1978 with a BA in advertising.

== Career ==
=== NW Ayer, Starwave, Walt Disney Internet Group ===
LeFurgy was hired as an assistant account executive at NW Ayer in their training program in 1978. Over the course of his tenure at the company, he worked on advertising for clients including AT&T, Burger King, and Procter & Gamble. He was promoted several times, becoming a senior partner and member of the board of directors. Towards the end of his 17-year career at Ayer, he developed a "passion for the web" and began to develop interactive media programs.

In 1995, on a flight to Boston for a meeting with Gillette, LeFurgy read an article about Starwave, a Seattle software and web content company founded by Paul Allen. LeFurgy, "intrigued" by the company as well as several of their online properties, traveled to Seattle, and after a series of interviews, he left NW Ayer, taking a 30% pay cut to become Starwave's head of advertising and product marketing. LeFurgy developed online advertising campaigns, partnerships and sponsorships and oversaw advertising for all of Starwave's properties, including ESPNetSportszone.com, a joint venture with Disney. It became the most successful Internet sports site in advertising revenue, generating $7 million annually. In 1997 Starwave began working with ABC News, owned by Disney, to increase the online presence of abc.com. Later that year, Disney purchased a stake in Starwave. When it exercised its option to buy the company in 1998, LeFurgy was named senior vice president of advertising for the Walt Disney Internet Group/Buena Vista Internet Group.

=== IAB, FAST ===
In 1996, LeFurgy and ad sales executives from Prodigy, Microsoft, and other companies founded the Interactive Advertising Bureau, an industry trade organization that standardized online advertising formats, audience measurement methods, and metrics. For the next five years, as IAB chairman, LeFurgy oversaw the development of foundational standards such as internet ad size guidelines, the IAB Advertising Revenue Report conducted by PricewaterhouseCoopers, and standard publisher/agency terms and conditions.

While serving as chairman of the IAB, LeFurgy helped plan Procter & Gamble's Future of Advertising Stakeholders Summit (FAST). The summit was considered a "breakthrough event" because "it was the first time a major marketer invited all parties to the table -- including competitors -- to figure out how to make the Internet work as an ad medium." As a result of the summit, FAST Forward—an industry coalition made up of representatives of advertisers, ad agencies, online marketers, media researchers, and content providers—was formed. Its goal was to achieve industry-wide consensus beginning with four central issues: ad measurement, ad models, consumer acceptance, and media buying. LeFurgy chaired the FAST Forward steering committee.

=== WaldenVC, Archer Advisors ===
In 1998, LeFurgy joined venture capital firm WaldenVC as a general partner; in 2003, he transitioned to become a venture partner as he started an advisory firm. Among other ventures, LeFurgy led an investment in Blue Lithium, a behavioral ad network of 1,000 sites. LeFurgy was a director of the company, which was sold to Yahoo! in 2007.

LeFurgy founded Archer Advisors in 2003. Based in San Francisco, it assists early stage online media companies in areas related to investments, advisory projects, and, directorship.

== Recognition ==
LeFurgy received ad:tech's Industry Achievement Award and the Interactive Advertising Bureau Lifetime Achievement Award. In 2000, he was named to the Advertising Age Interactive Hall of Fame.

== Personal life ==
LeFurgy lives with his wife and children in Mill Valley, California. A CrossFit athlete, he finished in the Top 20 CrossFit Games in 2012.

== Other positions ==
| Years | Company | Role |
|---|---|---|
| 1978 — 1995 | NW Ayer | Senior partner, director |
| 1996 — Present | Interactive Advertising Bureau (IAB) | Founding chairman, 1996-2001; Ex officio board member |
| 1997 — 1998 | Advertising Research Foundation | Director |
| 1998 — 1999 | FAST (Future of Advertising Stakeholders) | Chairman |
| 1998 — 1998 | Advertising Education Foundation | Director |
| 1999 — 2003 | Snowball (renamed IGN after IPO) | Director |
| 2001 — Present | ad:tech | Advisory board |
| 2004 — 2005 | Web Clients | Director |
| 2004 — 2005 | Bay Area Interactive Group | Founding chairman |
| 2005 — 2007 | Blue Lithium | Director |
| 2005 — 2010 | Associated Content | Director |
| 2005 — 2011 | x+1 | Director |
| 2008 — Present | 1020 Placecast | Director |
| 2016 — Present | Stone Research Foundation | Director |
