= Hackensack, New Jersey =

City in Bergen County, New Jersey, US

- City
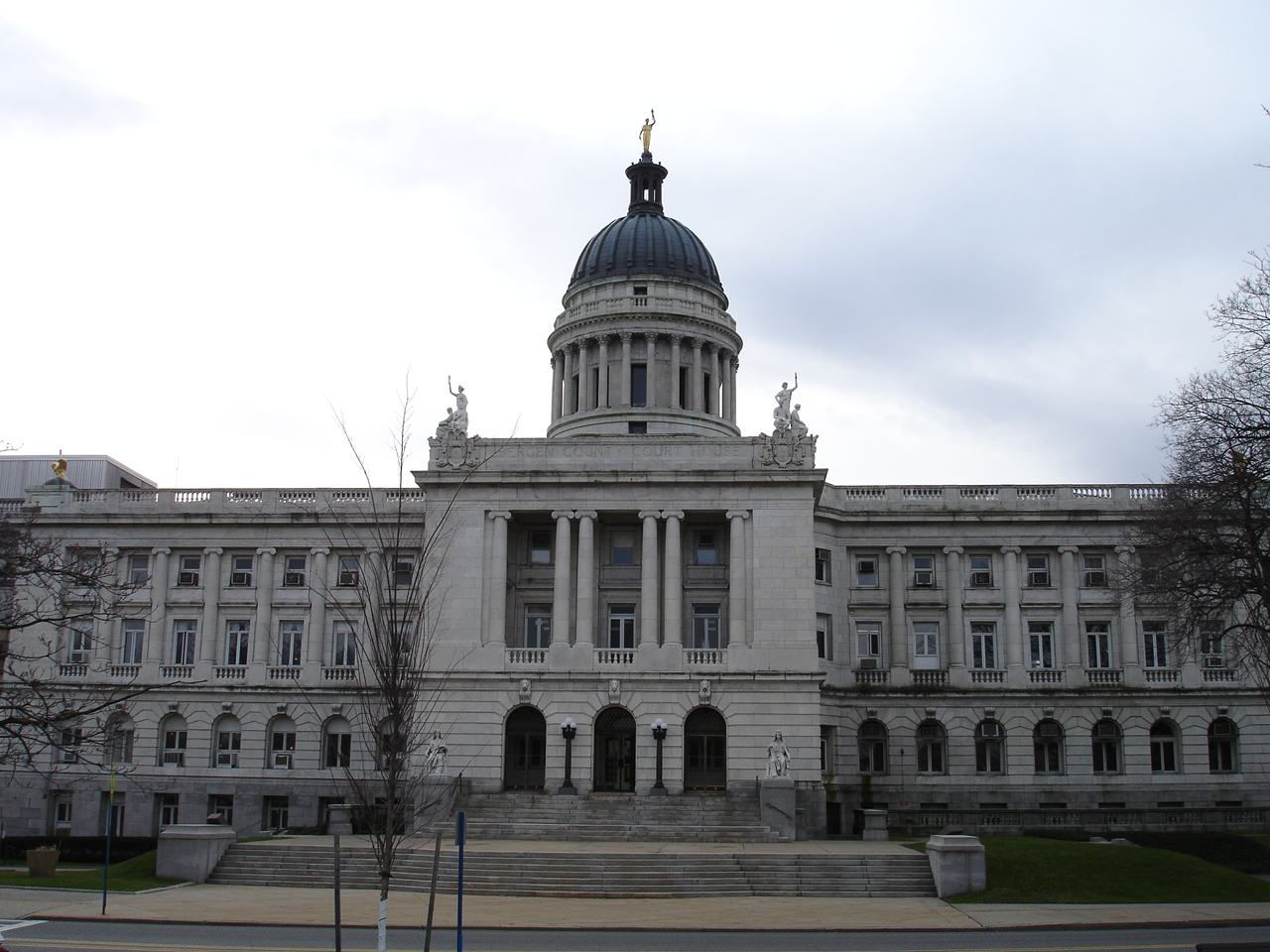
- The Bergen County Court House, designed in the American Renaissance style

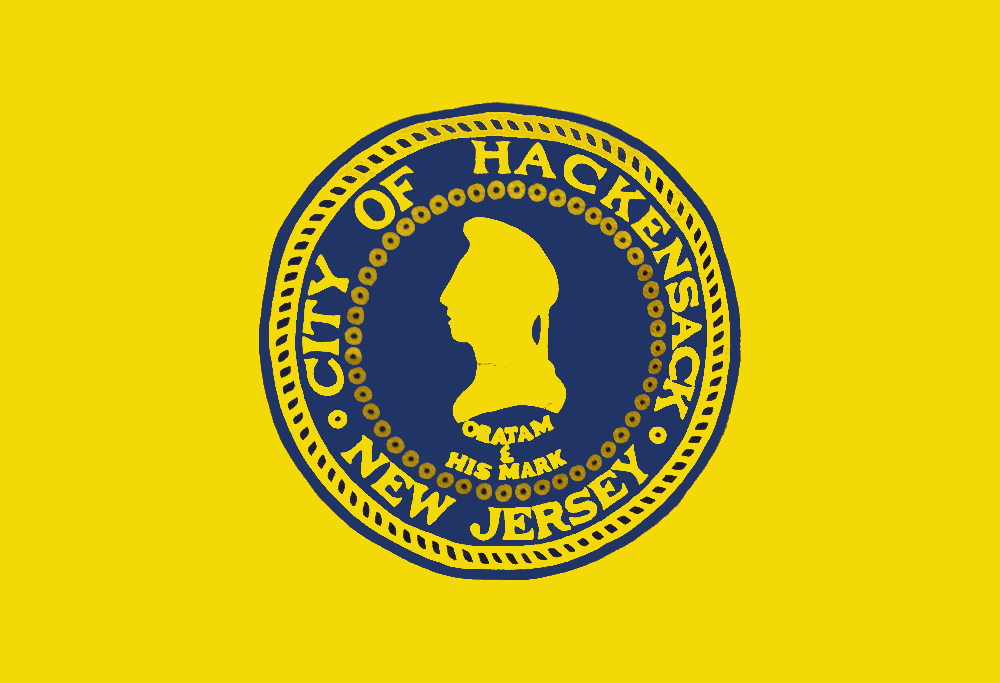
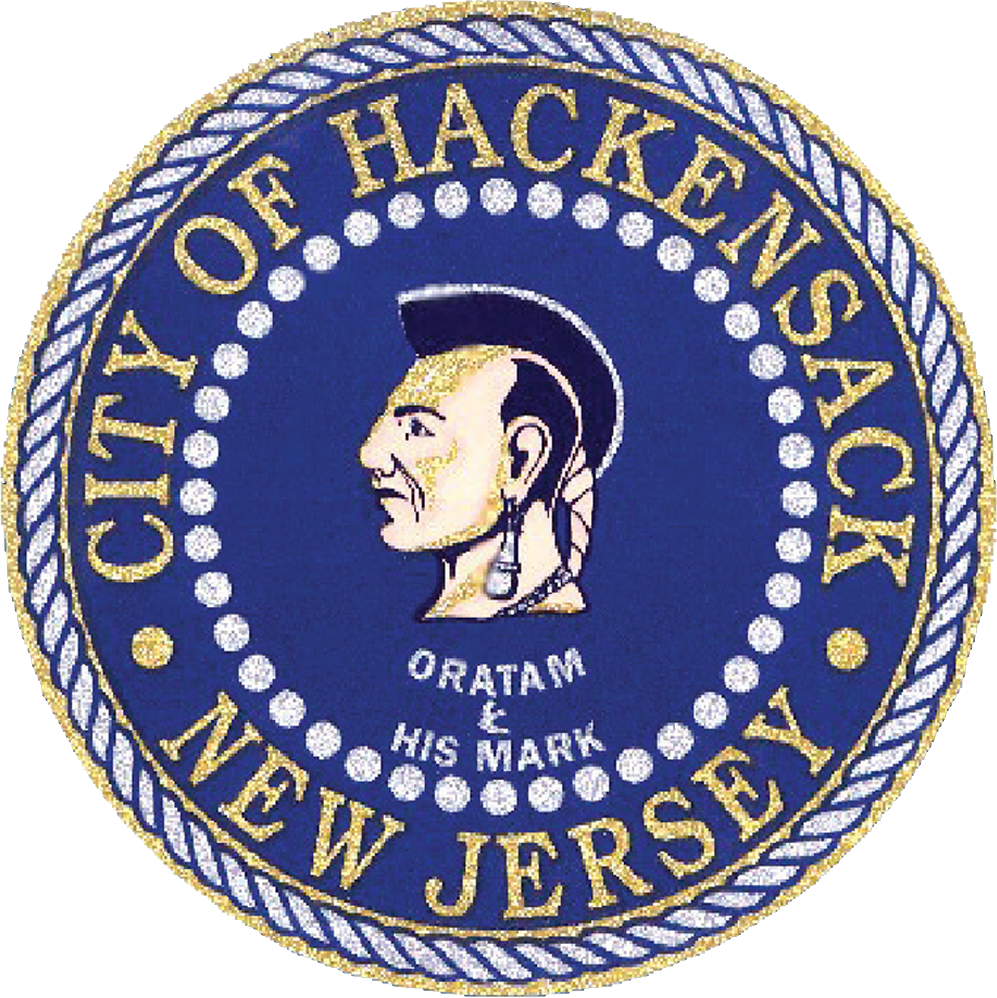
- Flag Seal Logo
- Motto: "A City in Motion"
- Location of Hackensack in Bergen County highlighted in red (left). Inset map: Location of Bergen County in New Jersey highlighted in orange (right).
- Interactive map of Hackensack, New Jersey
- Location in Bergen County Location in New Jersey Location in the United States
- Coordinates: 40.889398°N 74.045698°W
- Country: United States
- State: New Jersey
- County: Bergen
- Settled: 1665 (as New Barbadoes)
- Incorporated: October 31, 1693 (as New Barbadoes Township)
- Reincorporated: November 21, 1921 (as a city under current name)

Government
  - Type: Municipal council–manager
  - Body: City council
  - Mayor: Caseen Gaines (term ends June 30, 2029)
  - City manager: Thomas Freeman
  - Municipal clerk: Deborah Karlsson

Area
  - Total: 4.35 sq mi (11.27 km^{2})
  - Land: 4.19 sq mi (10.86 km^{2})
  - Water: 0.16 sq mi (0.41 km^{2}) 3.63%
  - Rank: 287th of 565 in state 16th of 70 in county
- Elevation: 20 ft (6.1 m)

Population (2020)
  - Total: 46,030
  - Estimate (2023): 45,736
  - Rank: 45th of 565 in state 1st of 70 in county
  - Density: 10,983.1/sq mi (4,240.6/km^{2})
  - Rank: 33rd of 565 in state 10th of 70 in county
- Time zone: UTC−05:00 (Eastern (EST))
  - Summer (DST): UTC−04:00 (Eastern (EDT))
- ZIP Code: 07601
- Area code: 201
- FIPS code: 3400328680
- GNIS feature ID: 885236
- Website: www.hackensack.org

Hackensack is the most populous municipality in and the county seat of Bergen County, in the U.S. state of New Jersey. The area was officially named New Barbadoes Township until 1921, but has informally been known as Hackensack since at least the 18th century. As of the 2020 United States census, the city's population was 46,030, its highest decennial count ever and an increase of 3,020 (+7.0%) from the 2010 census count of 43,010, which in turn reflected an increase of 333 (+0.8%) from the 42,677 counted in the 2000 census.

An inner suburb of New York City, Hackensack is located approximately 12 miles (19 km) northwest of Midtown Manhattan and about 7 miles (11 km) from the George Washington Bridge. From a number of locations, including portions of Prospect Avenue, the New York City skyline can be seen.

The Metropolitan Campus of Fairleigh Dickinson University straddles the Hackensack River in both Hackensack and Teaneck. Hackensack is also the home of the former New Jersey Naval Museum and the World War II submarine USS Ling. Astronaut Wally Schirra is perhaps Hackensack's most famous native son.

The city has diverse neighborhoods and land uses located close to one another. Within its borders are the Hackensack University Medical Center, a residential high-rise district about a mile long (along Prospect Avenue between Beech Street and Passaic Street), suburban neighborhoods of single-family houses, stately older homes on acre-plus lots, older two-family neighborhoods, large garden apartment complexes, industrial areas, the Bergen County Jail, a tidal river, Hackensack River County Park, Borg's Woods Nature Preserve, various city parks, large office buildings, a major college campus, the Bergen County Court House, a vibrant small-city downtown district, and various small neighborhood business districts.

== History ==
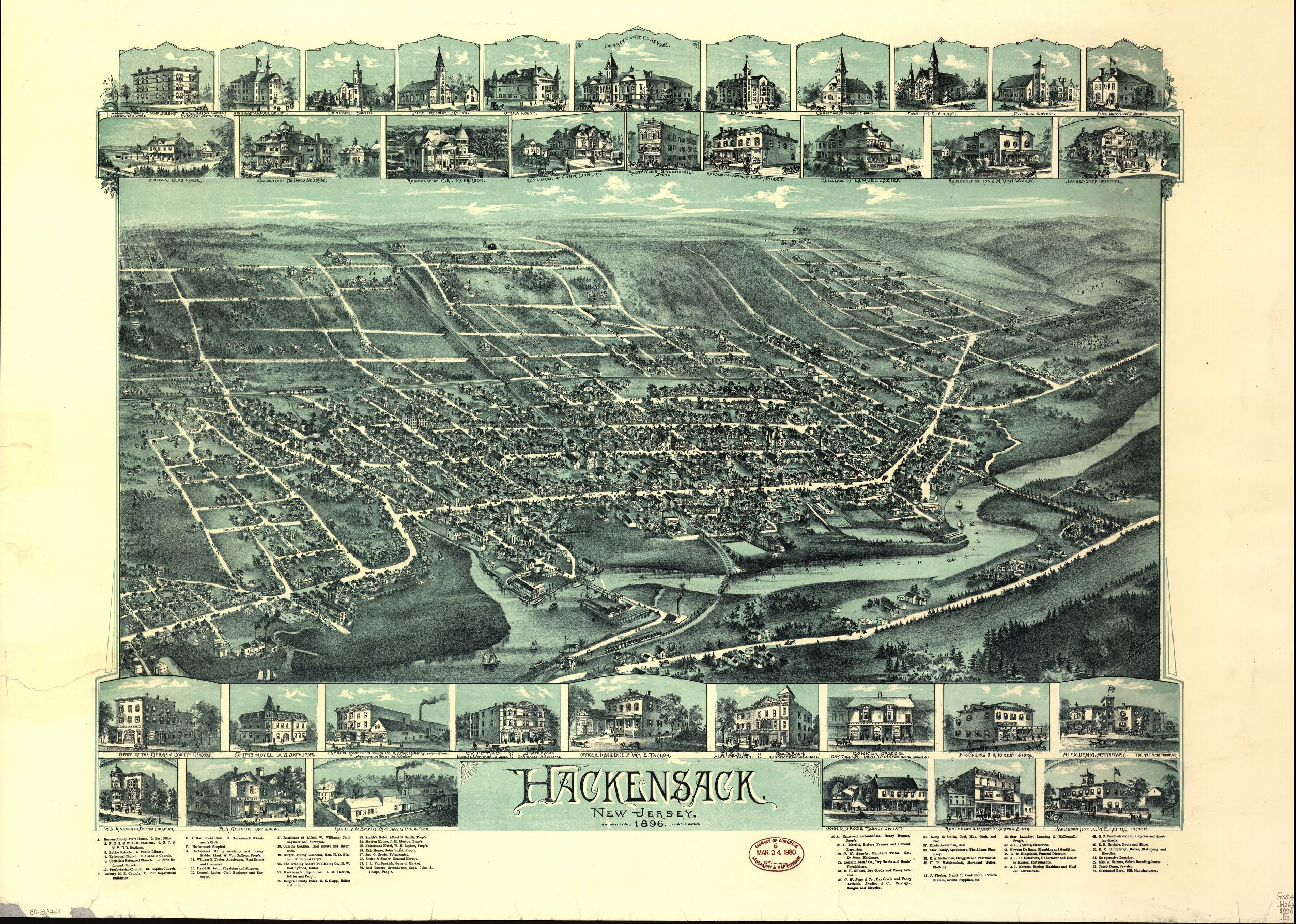
Hackensack map c. 1896

The earliest known inhabitants of the area were the Lenni Lenape, an Algonquian people who became known to settlers as 'the Delaware Indians.' They lived along a river they called Achinigeu-hach, or "Ackingsah-sack", which translates to stony ground—today this river is more commonly known by the name 'the Hackensack River.' A representation of Chief Oratam of the Achkinhenhcky appears on the Hackensack municipal seal. The most common explanation is that the city was named for the Native American tribe, though other sources attribute it to a Native American word variously translated as meaning "hook mouth", "stream that unites with another on low ground", "on low ground" or "land of the big snake", while another version described as "more colorful than probable" attributes the name to an inn called the "Hock and Sack".

Settlement by the Dutch West India Company in New Netherland on the west banks of the Hudson River across from New Amsterdam (present-day lower Manhattan) began in the 1630s at Pavonia, eventually leading to the establishment of Bergen (at today's Bergen Square in Jersey City) in 1660.

Oratam, sachem of the Lenni Lenape, deeded the land along mid-Hackensack River to the Dutch in 1665. The area was soon taken by the English in 1667, but kept its Dutch name. Philip Cartaret, governor of what became the proprietary colony of East Jersey granted land to Captain John Berry in the area of Achter Kol and soon after took up residence and called it "New Barbadoes," after having resided on the island of Barbados. In 1666, a deed was confirmed for the 2,260-acre (9.1 km^{2}) tract that had been given earlier by Oratem to Sarah Kiersted in gratitude for her work as emissary and interpreter. Other grants were given at the English Neighborhood.

In 1675, the East Jersey Legislature established the administrative districts Bergen, Essex, Middlesex, and Monmouth. In 1683, Bergen (along with the three other counties) was officially recognized as an independent county by the Provincial Assembly. The seal of Bergen County bearing this date includes an image of an agreement between the European settlers and the Native Americans.

New Barbadoes Township, together with Acquackanonk Township, were formed by Royal charter on October 31, 1693.

In 1700, the village of Hackensack was little more than the area around Main Street from the Courthouse to around Anderson Street. New Barbadoes Township included what is now Maywood, Rochelle Park, Paramus and River Edge, along with those portions of Oradell that are west of the Hackensack River. These areas were all sparsely populated and consisted of farm fields, woods and swamplands. The few roads that existed then included the streets now known as Kinderkamack Road, Paramus Road/Passaic Street and Essex Street. The southernmost portions of what is now Hackensack were not part of New Barbadoes Township at that time and were acquired in the late 1800s.

The neighborhood that came to be known as the village of Hackensack (today the area encompassing Bergen County's municipal buildings in Hackensack) was a part of Essex County until 1710, when Bergen County, by royal decree of Queen Anne of Great Britain, was enlarged and the Township of New Barbadoes was removed from Essex County and added to Bergen County.

In 1710, the village of Hackensack (in the newly formed Township of New Barbadoes) was designated as being more centrally located and more easily reached by the majority of the Bergen County's inhabitants and, hence, was chosen as the county seat of Bergen County, as it remains today. The earliest records of the Bergen County Board of Chosen Freeholders date back to 1715, at which time agreement was made to build a courthouse and jail complex, which was completed in 1716.

During the American Revolutionary War, George Washington headquartered in the village of Hackensack in November 1776 during the retreat from Fort Lee via New Bridge Landing and camped on 'The Green' across from the First Dutch Reformed Church on November 20, 1776. A raid by British forces against Hackensack on March 23, 1780, resulted in the destruction by fire of the original courthouse structure.

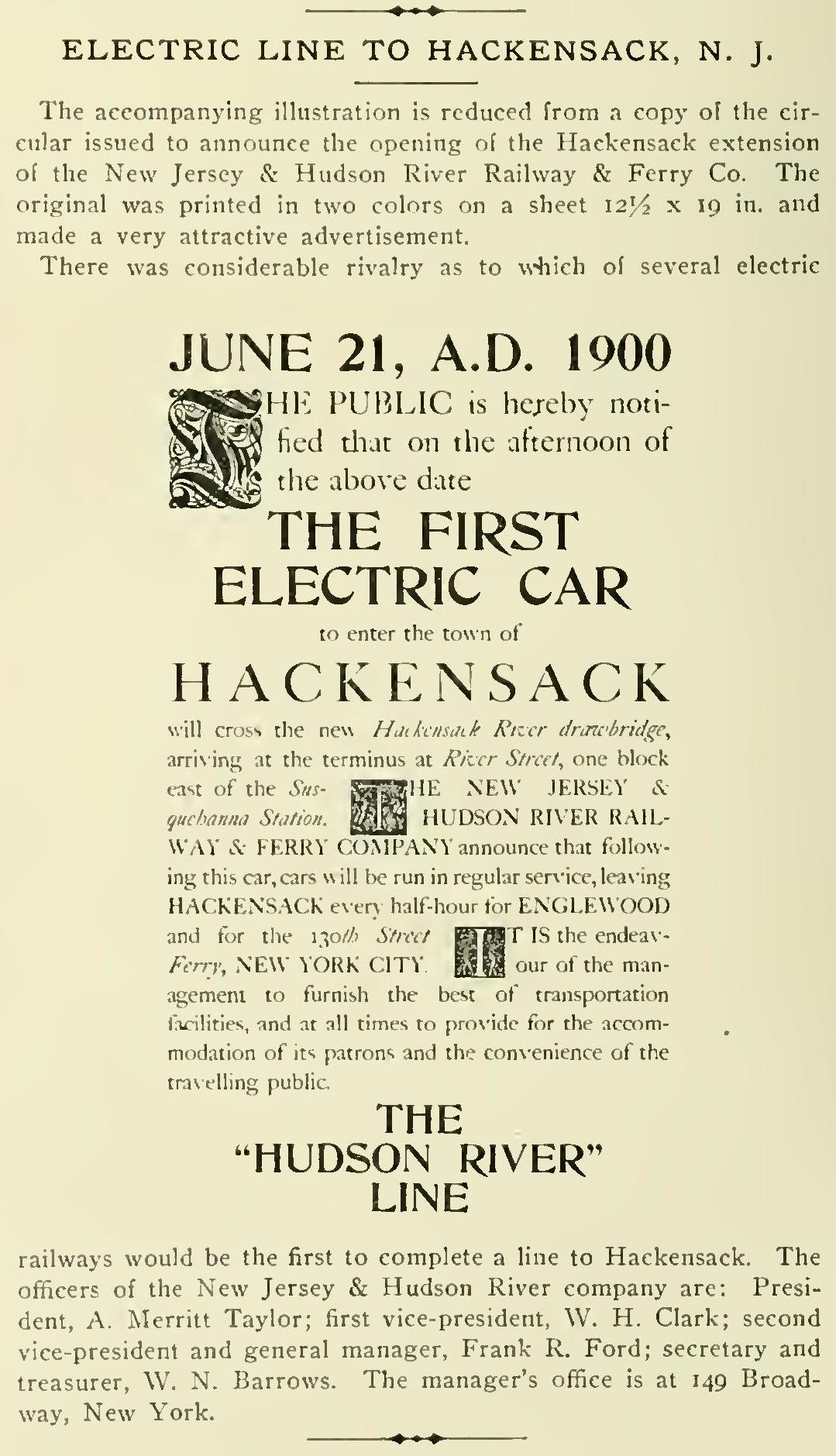
Article in The Street Railway Review of July 1900

The Hackensack Improvement Commission was incorporated by an Act of the state legislature approved on April 1, 1868, within New Barbadoes township and including the village of Hackensack, with authority to develop sewers and other improvements in Hackensack.

The New Jersey Legislature passed the Township School Act in 1894, under which each village, borough, town, or city in New Jersey was delegated responsibility for its own public schools through the office of the county superintendent. Hackensack established a local board of education in 1894, as required by the new law, which took over operation of schools located in the township and established Hackensack High School. The 1894 act allowed local residents, by petition, to change municipal boundaries at will, setting off fearsome political battles statewide.

Portions of the township had been taken to form Harrington Township (June 22, 1775), Lodi Township (March 1, 1826), Midland Township (March 7, 1871) and Little Ferry (September 20, 1894). After these departures, secessions, and de-annexations, all that was left of New Barbadoes Township was the village of Hackensack and its surrounding neighborhoods of Fairmount, Red Hill and Cherry Hill. In 1896, New Barbadoes acquired a portion of Lodi Township covering an area south of Essex Street from the bend of Essex Street to the Maywood border. That same year the Hackensack Improvement commission was abolished and the City of Hackensack and New Barbadoes Township became coterminous.

The final parcel lost by New Barbadoes Township was the northeastern corner of what is now Little Ferry, which was incorporated in September 1894.

An act of the State Legislature incorporated the Fairmount section of New Barbadoes with the Hackensack Improvement Commission, and eliminated New Barbadoes Township as a political entity. On November 21, 1921, based on the results of a referendum held on November 8, 1921, New Barbadoes Township received its charter to incorporate as a city and officially took on its name "Hackensack," a name derived from its original inhabitants, the Lenni Lenape, who named it "Ackingsah-sack".

In 1933, Hackensack adopted the Manager form of government under the terms of the 1923 Municipal Manager Law, with five Council persons all elected at-large and a mayor selected by the council from among its members.

The Sears location on Main Street, which opened on October 27, 1932, and was the last freestanding Sears in the state of New Jersey, closed on September 12, 2020.

== Geography ==
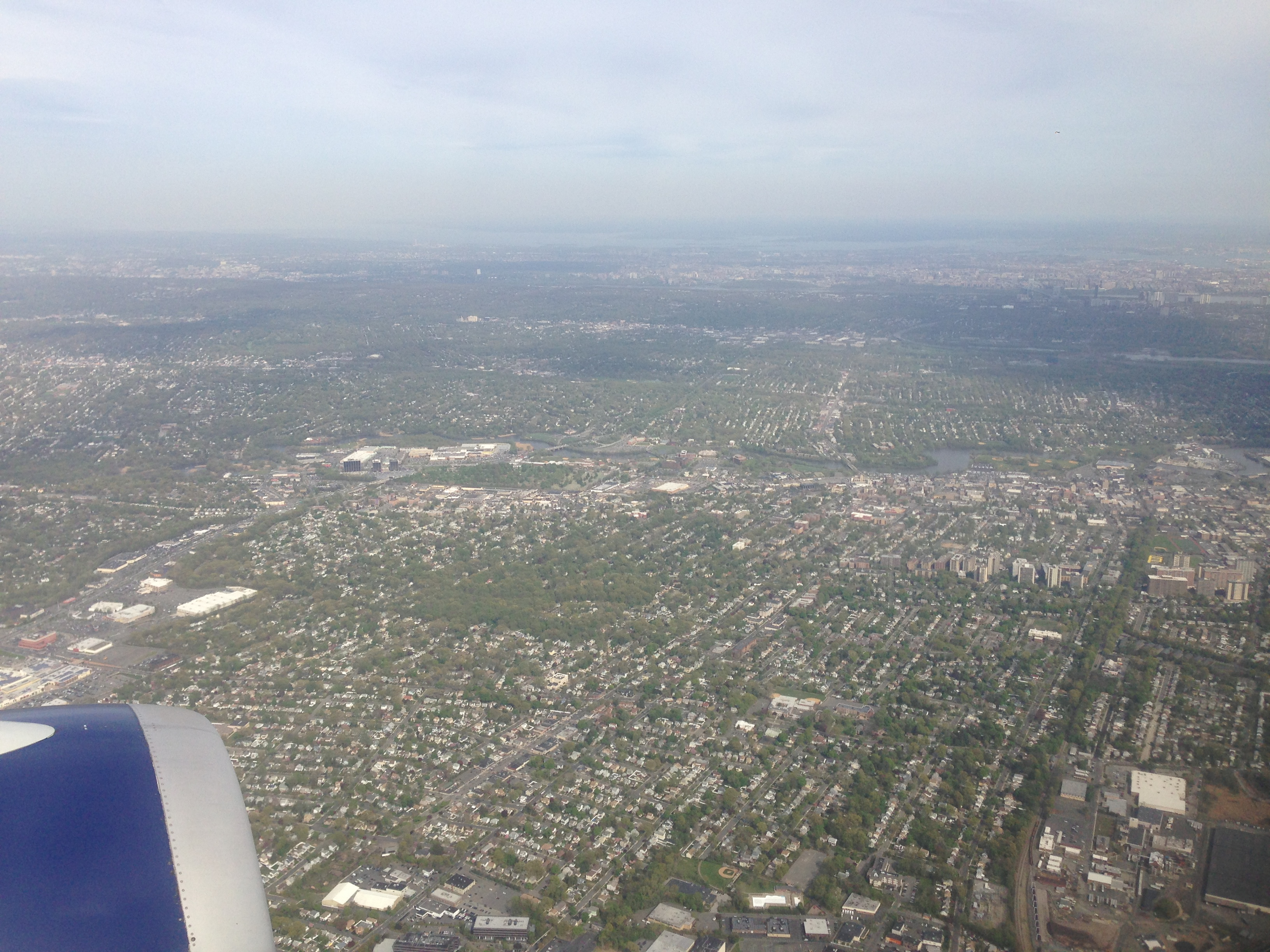
Aerial view of Hackensack

According to the United States Census Bureau, the city had a total area of 4.35 square miles (11.27 km^{2}), including 4.19 square miles (10.86 km^{2}) of land and 0.16 square miles (0.41 km^{2}) of water (3.63%).

The city is bordered by the Bergen County municipalities of Bogota, Hasbrouck Heights, Little Ferry, Lodi, Maywood, Paramus, Ridgefield Park, River Edge, South Hackensack, Teaneck and Teterboro.

There are many houses of historic value, and some of these were identified in the 1990 Master Plan. The city does not have any registered historic districts, or any restrictions on preserving the historic facade in any portions of the city. Areas considered suburban single-family residential neighborhoods account for about one-third of the city's area, mostly along its western side.

Unincorporated communities, localities and place names located partially or completely within the city include Fairmount and North Hackensack.

== Demographics ==
Historical population
Census	Pop.	Note	%±
1810	2,835		—
1820	2,592		−8.6%
1830	1,693	*	−34.7%
1840	2,104		24.3%
1850	2,265		7.7%
1860	3,558		57.1%
1870	4,929		38.5%
1880	4,248	*	−13.8%
1890	6,004		41.3%
1900	9,443	*	57.3%
1910	14,050		48.8%
1920	17,667		25.7%
1930	24,568		39.1%
1940	26,279		7.0%
1950	29,219		11.2%
1960	30,521		4.5%
1970	36,008		18.0%
1980	36,039		0.1%
1990	37,049		2.8%
2000	42,677		15.2%
2010	43,010		0.8%
2020	46,030		7.0%
2023 (est.)	45,736		−0.6%
Population sources: 1850–1920; 1850–1870 1850 1870; 1880–1890 1890–1910 1880–1930; 1900–2020 2000; 2010 2020 * = Lost territory in previous decade.

=== Racial and ethnic composition ===
Hackensack city, New Jersey – Racial and ethnic composition Note: the US Census treats Hispanic/Latino as an ethnic category. This table excludes Latinos from the racial categories and assigns them to a separate category. Hispanics/Latinos may be of any race.
Race / Ethnicity (NH = Non-Hispanic)	Pop 2000	Pop 2010	Pop 2020	% 2000	% 2010	% 2020
White alone (NH)	17,013	12,845	11,053	39.86%	29.87%	24.01%
Black or African American alone (NH)	10,092	9,693	9,558	23.65%	22.54%	20.76%
Native American or Alaska Native alone (NH)	90	67	62	0.21%	0.16%	0.13%
Asian alone (NH)	3,163	4,372	4,734	7.41%	10.17%	10.28%
Native Hawaiian or Pacific Islander alone (NH)	8	5	7	0.02%	0.01%	0.02%
Other race alone (NH)	111	178	435	0.26%	0.41%	0.95%
Mixed race or Multiracial (NH)	1,139	664	961	2.67%	1.54%	2.09%
Hispanic or Latino (any race)	11,061	15,186	19,220	25.92%	35.31%	41.76%
Total	42,677	43,010	46,030	100.00%	100.00%	100.00%

=== Ethnic diversity ===
As the initial destination for many immigrants to Bergen County from around the globe, Hackensack's ethnic composition has become exceptionally diverse. As of 2013, approximately 38.9% of the population was foreign-born. In addition, 2.5% were born in the U.S. territory of Puerto Rico or abroad to American parents. Over half, 51.7%, of the population over the age of five speak only English in their household, while 32.5% of the population speak Spanish at home. The South Asian and East Asian populations have increased most rapidly in Hackensack since 2000, with nearly 2,000 Indian Americans, over 1,000 Filipino Americans, and over 600 Korean Americans represented in the 2010 United States Census. Hackensack's Hispanic population has also risen rapidly, to over 15,000 in 2010; Ecuadoreans, Dominicans, and Colombians have become the top Hispanic groups in northern Hackensack. The Black population dropped as a percentage, although minimally in absolute numbers between 2000 and 2010. The city lost approximately 10% of its White population between 2000 and 2010, which has stabilized and resumed growth since 2010 and has remained substantial, at over 20,000 in 2010. The city has also witnessed greatly increasing diversity in its non-Hispanic white segment, with large numbers of Eastern Europeans, Eurasians, Central Asians, and Arabic immigrants offsetting the loss in Hackensack's earlier established Italian American, Irish American, and German American populations.

=== 2020 census ===
As of the 2020 census, Hackensack had a population of 46,030. The median age was 40.1 years. 17.5% of residents were under the age of 18 and 16.1% of residents were 65 years of age or older. For every 100 females there were 96.9 males, and for every 100 females age 18 and over there were 94.2 males age 18 and over.

100.0% of residents lived in urban areas, while 0.0% lived in rural areas.

There were 19,132 households in Hackensack, of which 24.3% had children under the age of 18 living in them. Of all households, 33.5% were married-couple households, 24.6% were households with a male householder and no spouse or partner present, and 35.0% were households with a female householder and no spouse or partner present. About 38.4% of all households were made up of individuals and 12.6% had someone living alone who was 65 years of age or older.

There were 20,290 housing units, of which 5.7% were vacant. The homeowner vacancy rate was 1.0% and the rental vacancy rate was 5.2%.

Racial composition as of the 2020 census
Race	Number	Percent
White	13,500	29.3%
Black or African American	10,193	22.1%
American Indian and Alaska Native	543	1.2%
Asian	4,780	10.4%
Native Hawaiian and Other Pacific Islander	12	0.0%
Some other race	11,106	24.1%
Two or more races	5,896	12.8%
Hispanic or Latino (of any race)	19,220	41.8%

=== 2010 census ===
The 2010 United States census counted 43,010 people, 18,142 households, and 9,706 families in the city. The population density was 10,290.0 per square mile (3,973.0/km^{2}). There were 19,375 housing units at an average density of 4,635.4 per square mile (1,789.7/km^{2}). The racial makeup was 46.67% (20,072) White, 24.44% (10,511) Black or African American, 0.56% (241) Native American, 10.30% (4,432) Asian, 0.02% (10) Pacific Islander, 13.59% (5,844) from other races, and 4.42% (1,900) from two or more races. Hispanic or Latino of any race were 35.31% (15,186) of the population.

Of the 18,142 households, 23.2% had children under the age of 18; 34.1% were married couples living together; 13.9% had a female householder with no husband present and 46.5% were non-families. Of all households, 39.3% were made up of individuals and 10.4% had someone living alone who was 65 years of age or older. The average household size was 2.30 and the average family size was 3.11.

18.7% of the population were under the age of 18, 8.3% from 18 to 24, 34.6% from 25 to 44, 26.1% from 45 to 64, and 12.4% who were 65 years of age or older. The median age was 37.5 years. For every 100 females, the population had 98.0 males. For every 100 females ages 18 and older there were 96.4 males.

The Census Bureau's 2006–2010 American Community Survey showed that (in 2010 inflation-adjusted dollars) median household income was $57,676 (with a margin of error of +/− $3,577) and the median family income was $66,911 (+/− $5,433). Males had a median income of $45,880 (+/− $4,012) versus $42,059 (+/− $1,681) for females. The per capita income for the city was $32,036 (+/− $1,809). About 8.9% of families and 10.7% of the population were below the poverty line, including 13.2% of those under age 18 and 11.7% of those age 65 or over.

Same-sex couples headed 145 households in 2010, an increase from the 112 counted in 2000.

=== 2000 census ===
As of the 2000 United States census, there were 42,677 people, 18,113 households, and 9,545 families residing in the city. The population density was 10,358.3 inhabitants per square mile (3,999.4/km^{2}). There were 18,945 housing units at an average density of 4,598.2 per square mile (1,775.4/km^{2}). The racial makeup of the city was 52.61% White, 24.65% African American, 0.45% Native American, 7.45% Asian, 0.05% Pacific Islander, 9.71% from other races, and 5.08% from two or more races. Hispanic or Latino of any race were 25.92% of the population.

There were 18,113 households, out of which 21.9% had children under the age of 18 living with them, 34.8% were married couples living together, 13.0% had a female householder with no husband present, and 47.3% were non-families. 39.8% of all households were made up of individuals, and 9.4% had someone living alone who was 65 years of age or older. The average household size was 2.26 and the average family size was 3.08.

In the city, the population was spread out, with 18.2% under the age of 18, 8.6% from 18 to 24, 38.4% from 25 to 44, 22.3% from 45 to 64, and 12.5% who were 65 years of age or older. The median age was 36 years. For every 100 females, there were 98.7 males. For every 100 females age 18 and over, there were 98.5 males.

The median income for a household in the city was $49,316, and the median income for a family was $56,953. Males had a median income of $39,636 versus $32,911 for females. The per capita income for the city was $26,856. About 6.8% of families and 9.3% of the population were below the poverty line, including 9.1% of those under age 18 and 10.3% of those age 65 or over.

== Parks and recreation ==
Borg's Woods Nature Preserve is a wooded municipal park covering 15 acres (6.1 ha). Efforts to create the park date back to a 1979 study that showed that the city had less parkland available to residents than specified by benchmarks.

== Government ==
=== Local government ===
Hackensack operates under the 1923 Municipal Manager Law form of New Jersey municipal government. The city is one of seven municipalities (of the 564) statewide that use this form of government. The City Council is comprised of five members who are elected to four-year terms on a concurrent basis in a non-partisan election held every four years in May. This form of government separates policy making (the work of the mayor and city council) from the execution of policy (the work of the city manager). This maintains professional management and a Citywide perspective through: nonpartisan election, at-large representation, concentration of executive responsibility in the hands of a professional manager accountable to the Mayor and Council, concentration of policy making power in one body: a five-person Mayor and Council. In the several decades since the city adopted the Municipal Manager form of government, Hackensack has had only nine City Managers.

As of 2025, the mayor of the City of Hackensack is Caseen Gaines, whose term of office as mayor ends June 30, 2029, along with those of all other councilmembers. The other members of the Hackensack City Council are Deputy Mayor Agatha Toomey, Philip Carroll, Sonya Clark-Collins and Roberto Diaz.

In an election that focused on development and the use of payment in lieu of taxes agreements to developers, the challenger's Hackensack Unites slate of Philip Carroll, Sonya Clark-Collins, Roberto Diaz, Caseen Gaines and Agatha Toomey defeated a slate led by three-term mayor John Labrosse.

Led by Mayor Labrosse, a team of candidates including four incumbents (and one newcomer) won the May 2021 municipal election. The winning slate defeated two other groups of five candidates, one of which was led by former deputy mayor David Sims.

The May 2017 election was won by the Labrosse Team, which include the mayor and three other incumbents, joined by one newcomer.

In April 2015, the city council selected Jason Some on an interim basis to fill the vacant seat of Rose Greenman, who had resigned the previous month citing claims that her council colleagues had discriminated against her. In the November 2015 general election, Deborah Keeling-Geddis was elected to serve the balance of the term of office, edging interim councilmember Jason Some by 24 votes in the final count, with four candidates running for the seat.

City Council candidate Joseph DeFalco, principal of Hackensack High School, died of a heart attack the day of the municipal election in 2005, but was elected despite his death. Calvin Coles, who had received the sixth highest number of votes, sued in Superior Court, claiming he should be elected as he received the sixth highest number of vote. However, the Court held that DeFalco's death created a vacancy on the Council to be filled in accordance with the Municipal Vacancy Law. DeFalco's running mates appointed Charles P. McAuliffe to the Council. McAuliffe served for four years. . The Council members agreed to create a rotation under which each of the four surviving members of the New Visions for Hackensack slate would serve for a year as Mayor, creating a series of firsts for the City. . Townes took office in 2005 as the city's first black mayor, and Sasso became the first female mayor in 2006. Meneses became Hackensack's first Hispanic mayor when he was sworn in on July 1, 2007, and Melfi took the reins as mayor in 2008. Four of the same five officials were re-elected in 2009 (Townes, Melfi, Sasso, Meneses), along with one opposition candidate, LaBrosse. The city council continued to rotate the mayor's seat, with the exception of Labrosse, and Melfi became mayor again in 2012.

Walter E. Nowakowski served as mayor from 1965-1969, Frank Zisa served as mayor from 1977 to 1981, Fred Cerbo from 1981 to 1989, and John F. "Jack" Zisa (son of Frank Zisa) from 1989 to 2005.

Former Assemblyman Charles "Ken" Zisa served as chief of the Hackensack Police Department from his 1995 appointment to replace John Aletta until May 2010 when he was suspended without pay on charges of official misconduct and insurance fraud. Tomas Padilla was appointed the acting police chief while the police department was being monitored by the Bergen County Prosecutors office. In May 2012, a judge ordered Zisa out of his position as police chief, a decision that cost him his police retirement benefits. In January 2013, Mike Mordaga was appointed the new civilian police director, which replaced the previous position of police chief.

=== Federal, state and county representation ===
Hackensack is located in the 5th Congressional District and is part of New Jersey's 37th state legislative district.

For the 119th United States Congress, New Jersey's 5th congressional district is represented by Josh Gottheimer (D, Wyckoff). New Jersey is represented in the United States Senate by Democrats Cory Booker (Newark, term ends 2027) and Andy Kim (Moorestown, term ends 2031).

For the 2026–2027 session, the 37th legislative district of the New Jersey Legislature is represented in the New Jersey Senate by Gordon M. Johnson (D, Englewood) and in the General Assembly by Shama Haider (D, Tenafly) and Ellen Park (D, Englewood Cliffs).

Bergen County is governed by a directly elected County Executive, with legislative functions performed by a Board of County Commissioners comprised of seven members who are elected at-large to three-year terms in partisan elections on a staggered basis, with either two or three seats coming up for election each November; a Chairman and Vice Chairman are selected from among its seven members at a reorganization meeting held every January. As of 2025, the county executive is James J. Tedesco III (D, Paramus), whose four-year term of office ends December 31, 2026.

Bergen County's Commissioners are Chair Mary J. Amoroso (D, Mahwah, 2025), Vice Chair Steven A. Tanelli (D, North Arlington, 2027), Chair Pro Tem Joan Voss (D, Fort Lee, 2026), Rafael Marte (D, Bergenfield, 2026), Germaine M. Ortiz (D, Emerson, 2025), Thomas J. Sullivan Jr. (D, Montvale, 2025) and Tracy Silna Zur (D, Franklin Lakes, 2027).

Bergen County's elected constitutional officials are Clerk John S. Hogan (D, Northvale, 2026), Sheriff Anthony Cureton (D, Englewood, 2027) and Surrogate Michael R. Dressler (D, Cresskill, 2026).

=== Politics ===
As of March 2011, there were a total of 19,123 registered voters in Hackensack, of which 8,630 (45.1% vs. 31.7% countywide) were registered as Democrats, 1,993 (10.4% vs. 21.1%) were registered as Republicans and 8,492 (44.4% vs. 47.1%) were registered as Unaffiliated. There were 8 voters registered as either Libertarians or Greens. Among the city's 2010 Census population, 44.5% (vs. 57.1% in Bergen County) were registered to vote, including 54.7% of those ages 18 and over (vs. 73.7% countywide).

Gubernatorial election results for Hackensack
Year	Republican		Democratic		Third party(ies)	
Year	No.	%	No.	%	No.	%
2025	2,713	22.17%	9,458	77.30%	64	0.52%
2021	2,080	24.10%	6,499	75.31%	51	0.59%
2017	1,389	19.65%	5,557	78.60%	124	1.75%
2013	2,790	39.04%	4,268	59.72%	89	1.25%
2009	2,194	25.05%	6,247	71.31%	319	3.64%
2005	1,902	22.88%	6,217	74.80%	193	2.32%

In the 2013 gubernatorial election, Democrat Barbara Buono received 59.7% of the vote (4,268 cast), ahead of Republican Chris Christie with 39.0% (2,790 votes), and other candidates with 1.2% (89 votes), among the 7,327 ballots cast by the city's 19,506 registered voters (180 ballots were spoiled), for a turnout of 37.6%. In the 2009 gubernatorial election, Democrat Jon Corzine received 6,247 ballots cast (70.9% vs. 48.0% countywide), ahead of Republican Chris Christie with 2,194 votes (24.9% vs. 45.8%), Independent Chris Daggett with 288 votes (3.3% vs. 4.7%) and other candidates with 31 votes (0.4% vs. 0.5%), among the 8,812 ballots cast by the city's 19,819 registered voters, yielding a 44.5% turnout (vs. 50.0% in the county).

Presidential elections results
Year	Republican	Democratic
2024	30.4% 5,151	67.0% 11,338
2020	23.1% 4,160	75.8% 13,685
2016	21.2% 3,345	76.0% 12,015
2012	19.6% 2,835	78.6% 11,335
2008	22.6% 3,498	75.7% 11,711
2004	28.0% 3,870	71.0% 9,815

In the 2016 presidential election, Democrat Hillary Clinton received 12,015 votes (76.0% vs. 54.2% countywide), ahead of Republican Donald Trump with 3,345 votes (21.2% vs. 41.1%) and other candidates with 380 votes (2.4% vs. 4.6%), among the 15,913 ballots cast by the city's 22,926 registered voters, for a turnout of 69.4% (vs. 72.5% in Bergen County). In the 2012 presidential election, Democrat Barack Obama received 11,335 votes (78.6% vs. 54.8% countywide), ahead of Republican Mitt Romney with 2,835 votes (19.6% vs. 43.5%) and other candidates with 113 votes (0.8% vs. 0.9%), among the 14,428 ballots cast by the city's 20,971 registered voters, for a turnout of 68.8% (vs. 70.4% in Bergen County). In the 2008 presidential election, Democrat Barack Obama received 11,711 votes (75.7% vs. 53.9% countywide), ahead of Republican John McCain with 3,498 votes (22.6% vs. 44.5%) and other candidates with 102 votes (0.7% vs. 0.8%), among the 15,461 ballots cast by the city's 20,616 registered voters, for a turnout of 75.0% (vs. 76.8% in Bergen County). In the 2004 presidential election, Democrat John Kerry received 9,815 votes (71.0% vs. 51.7% countywide), ahead of Republican George W. Bush with 3,870 votes (28.0% vs. 47.2%) and other candidates with 88 votes (0.6% vs. 0.7%), among the 13,818 ballots cast by the city's 19,013 registered voters, for a turnout of 72.7% (vs. 76.9% in the whole county).

United States Senate election results for Hackensack1
Year	Republican		Democratic		Third party(ies)	
Year	No.	%	No.	%	No.	%
2024	4,330	27.43%	10,998	69.67%	458	2.90%
2018	2,256	20.41%	8,488	76.78%	311	2.81%
2012	2,467	18.67%	10,580	80.08%	165	1.25%
2006	2,032	24.29%	6,235	74.54%	98	1.17%

United States Senate election results for Hackensack2
Year	Republican		Democratic		Third party(ies)	
Year	No.	%	No.	%	No.	%
2020	3,614	20.74%	13,493	77.42%	322	1.85%
2014	1,512	20.74%	5,701	78.21%	76	1.04%
2013	1,157	21.24%	4,250	78.01%	41	0.75%
2008	3,009	22.15%	10,410	76.63%	166	1.22%

== Education ==
=== Public schools ===
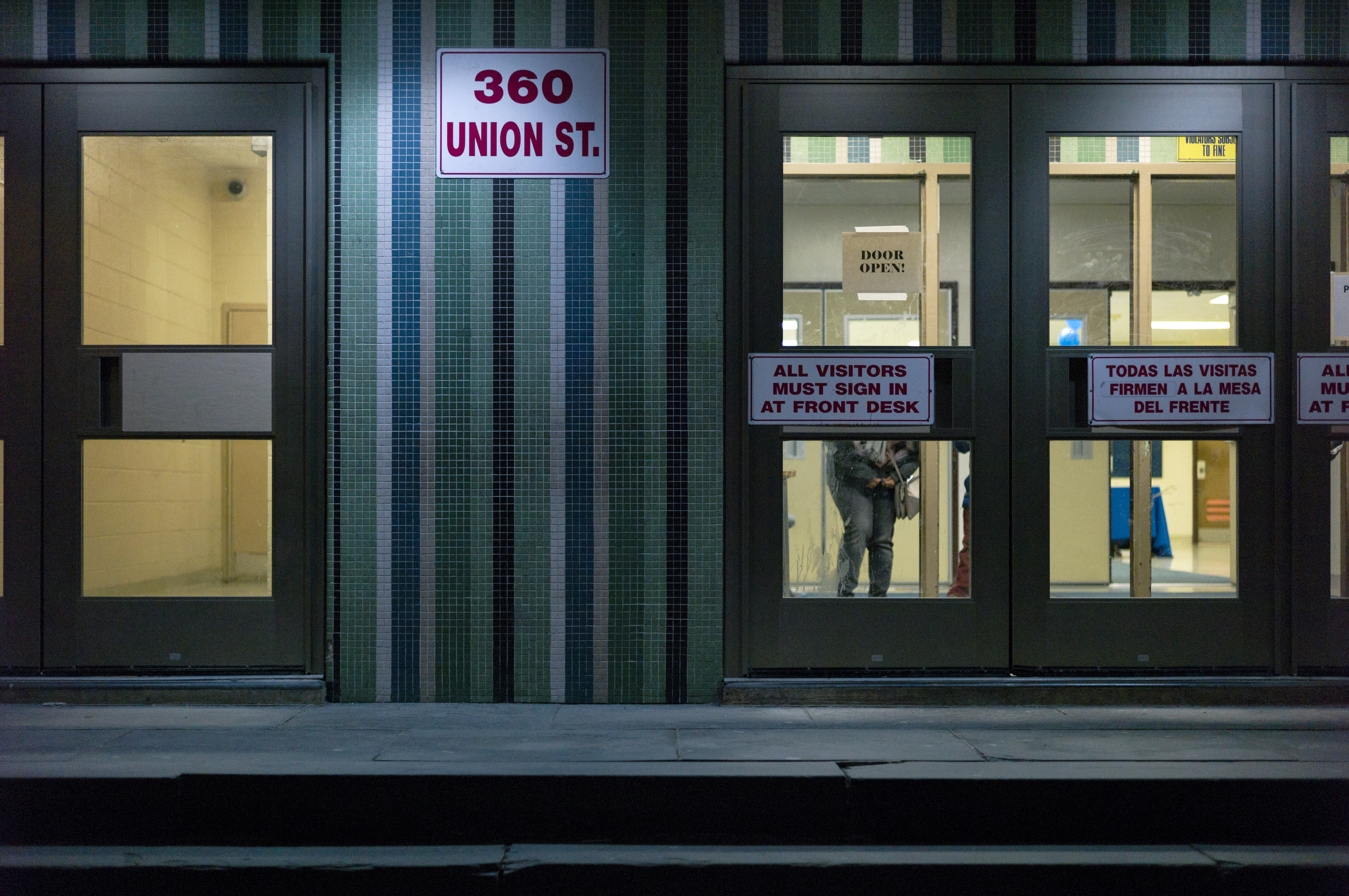
Main Entrance, Hackensack Middle School

The Hackensack Public Schools serve students in pre-kindergarten through twelfth grade. As of the 2021–22 school year, the district, comprised of six schools, had an enrollment of 5,483 students and 415.8 classroom teachers (on an FTE basis), for a student–teacher ratio of 13.2:1. Schools in the district, with 2021–22 enrollment data from the National Center for Education Statistics, are Early Childhood Development Center for preschool, Fairmount Elementary School with 598 students in grades PreK-4, Fanny Meyer Hillers School with 473 students in grades PreK-4, Jackson Avenue School with 435 students in grades PreK-4, Nellie K. Parker School with 527 students in grades PreK-4, Hackensack Middle School with 1,447 students in grades 5-8 and Hackensack High School with 1,852 students in grades 9-12.

Hackensack High School serves high school students living in neighboring communities as part of sending/receiving relationships with the respective districts, including about 250 from Maywood, 120 from Rochelle Park and 250 from South Hackensack as of 2012. Teterboro residents had been able to choose between Hackensack High School and Hasbrouck Heights School District's Hasbrouck Heights High School. In March 2020, the Maywood Public Schools received approval from the New Jersey Department of Education to end the relationship it had established with Hackensack in 1969 and begin transitioning incoming ninth graders to Henry P. Becton Regional High School beginning in the 2020–2021 school year.

Bergen Arts and Science Charter School serves public school students from Hackensack, as well as those from Garfield and Lodi.

Public school students from the borough, and all of Bergen County, are eligible to attend the secondary education programs offered by the Bergen County Technical Schools, which include the Bergen County Academies in Hackensack and the Bergen Tech campus in Teterboro or Paramus. The district offers programs on a shared-time or full-time basis, with admission based on a selective application process and tuition covered by the student's home school district.

=== Private schools ===
The First Baptist Church operates Bergen County Christian Academy, a K–12 school that was established in 1972 and is located at Union Street and Conklin Place.

The YCS George Washington School is a nonprofit private school for classified students ages 5–14 in grades K–8 who are experiencing behavioral and/or emotional difficulties. Its population consists of students who reside at the YCS Holley Child Care and Development Center in Hackensack and students within the surrounding communities whose needs cannot be adequately met in special education programs within their districts.

Padre Pio Academy is a defunct K–8 school that operated under the auspices of the Roman Catholic Archdiocese of Newark until its closure at the end of the 2012–2013 school year in the wake of declining enrollment and a deficit approaching $350,000. The school had been formed in 2009 by the diocese through the merger of St. Francis of Assisi School with Holy Trinity.

=== Colleges and universities ===
The Metropolitan Campus of Fairleigh Dickinson University straddles the Hackensack River in both Hackensack and Teaneck.

Bergen Community College has a location in Hackensack. The Philip Ciarco Jr. Learning Center, is located at 355 Main Street at the corner of Passaic Street.

Eastwick College is located at 250 Moore Street.

== Healthcare ==
Hackensack University Medical Center, part of Hackensack Meridian Health, is the primary health care provider and hospital for the city. Its main hospital campus, which includes a children's hospital, an all women's hospital, and Heart and Vascular Hospital, is located on 30 Prospect Avenue. The hospital's John Theurer Cancer Center is located on 2nd Street. Hackensack University Medical Center has two medical offices located on Russell Place and Essex Center.

== Transportation ==
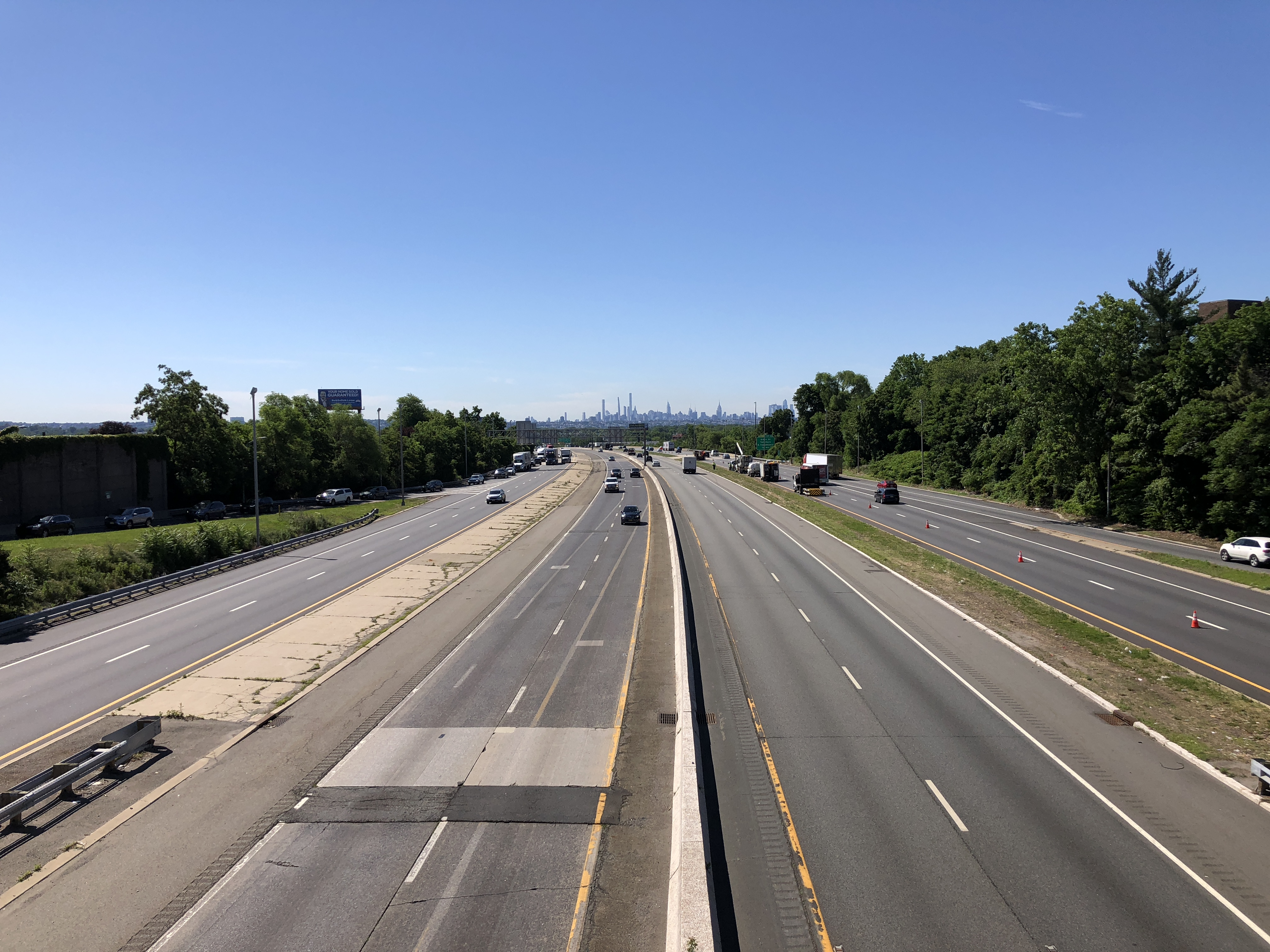
Interstate 80 eastbound at Route 17 in Hackensack

=== Roads and highways ===
As of May 2010, the city had a total of 79.69 miles (128.25 km) of roadways, of which 62.10 miles (99.94 km) were maintained by the municipality, 15.10 miles (24.30 km) by Bergen County and 2.49 miles (4.01 km) by the New Jersey Department of Transportation.

Interstate 80, Route 17, Route 4, and County Route 503 are among the many main roads serving Hackensack. Several bridges, including the Court Street Bridge, the Midtown Bridge and the Anderson Street Bridge span the Hackensack River.

=== Public transportation ===
The city is served by three train stations on NJ Transit's Pascack Valley Line, two of them in Hackensack, providing service to Hoboken Terminal with connecting service to Penn Station New York and other NJ Transit service at Secaucus Junction. Anderson Street station serves central Hackensack while Essex Street station serves southern portions of the city. The New Bridge Landing station, located adjacent to the city line in River Edge also serves the northernmost parts of Hackensack, including The Shops at Riverside.

NJ Transit provides bus service on routes 144, 162, 163, 164, 165 and 168 to the Port Authority Bus Terminal in Midtown Manhattan; the 171, 175, 178 and 182 to the George Washington Bridge Bus Station; the 76 to Newark; the 83 to Jersey City; and local service on routes 709, 712, 751, 752, 753, 755, 756, 762, 770, 772 and 780. Most routes serve the Hackensack Bus Terminal. Spanish Transportation provides frequent jitney service along Route 4 between Paterson and the George Washington Bridge Bus Station.

The Passaic-Bergen Rail Line planned to have two stops in Hackensack, but the proposal went dormant.

== Emergency services ==
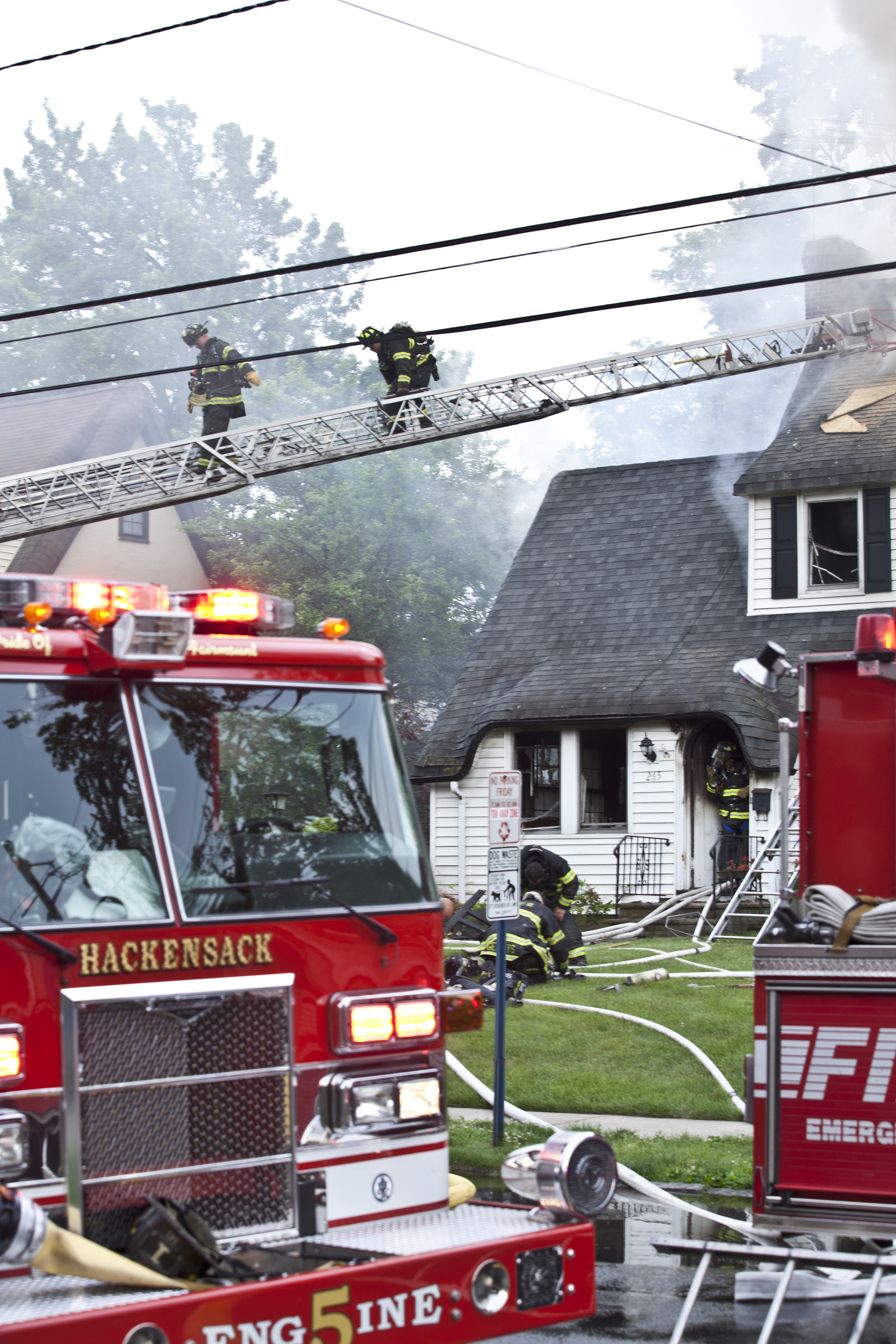
Hackensack Fire Department responding to a house fire

=== Fire department ===
The City of Hackensack is protected by a force of 100 paid, professional firefighters of the city of Hackensack Fire Department (HFD). The Hackensack Fire Department was first established on April 1, 1871, as Bergen Hook & Ladder Co. 1. In 1911, the full-time fire department was organized. The Hackensack Fire Department responds to approximately 7,500 emergency calls annually.

The Hackensack Ford dealership fire on July 1, 1988, resulted in the deaths of five firefighters after a bowstring truss roof collapsed. A message issued a minute before the collapse ordering firefighters out was never received due to defective communications equipment and two firefighters who survived the initial collapse could not be rescued as their calls for help were not received.

Ten firefighters from Hackensack have died in the line of duty.

The Hackensack Fire Department currently operates out of four fire stations located throughout the city, under the command of a Deputy Chief / Tour Commander for each shift. The Hackensack Fire Department operates a fire apparatus fleet of four engines, one ladder, two rescues (Rescue 2 is part of the Metro USAR Collapse Rescue Strike Team), one Metro USAR (urban search and rescue) Collapse Rescue Shoring Unit, one Special Operations (flood rescue) Unit, one Air Cascade Unit, one fire alarm maintenance bucket truck, two spare engines, and one spare ladder, as well as several special and support units.

The department is part of the Metro USAR Strike Team, which consists of nine North Jersey fire departments and other emergency services divisions working to address major emergency rescue situations.

Fire station locations and apparatus

Engine company	Ladder company	Special unit	Command unit	Address
Engine 1		Special Operations Flood Rescue Unit		199 Hudson Street
Engine 2				107 S. Summit Avenue
Engine 4	Ladder 1	Rescue 1, Rescue 2 (Metro USAR Collapse Rescue Strike Team Unit), Air Cascade 1, Metro USAR (Urban Search And Rescue) Collapse Rescue Shoring Unit, (reserve/spare apparatus – Ladder 2, Engine 3, Engine 6)	Deputy Chief 1/Tour Commander	205 State Street
Engine 5				784 Main Street

=== Ambulance ===
The Hackensack Volunteer Ambulance Corps provides emergency medical services to Hackensack and other nearby towns through mutual aid agreements. The Corps operates nightly from 6 pm to 6 am, and 24 hours on Saturdays and Sundays. Daytime EMS is provided seven days a week by the Hackensack University Medical Center's ambulance service, overlapping volunteer coverage on weekends. Both the Hackensack University Medical Center and Hackensack Volunteer Ambulance Corps are dispatched by MICCOM, the Northern New Jersey Mobile Intensive Care Communications Network. MICCOM provides dispatch and emergency medical call taking with pre-arrival instructions and updates.

== Points of interest ==
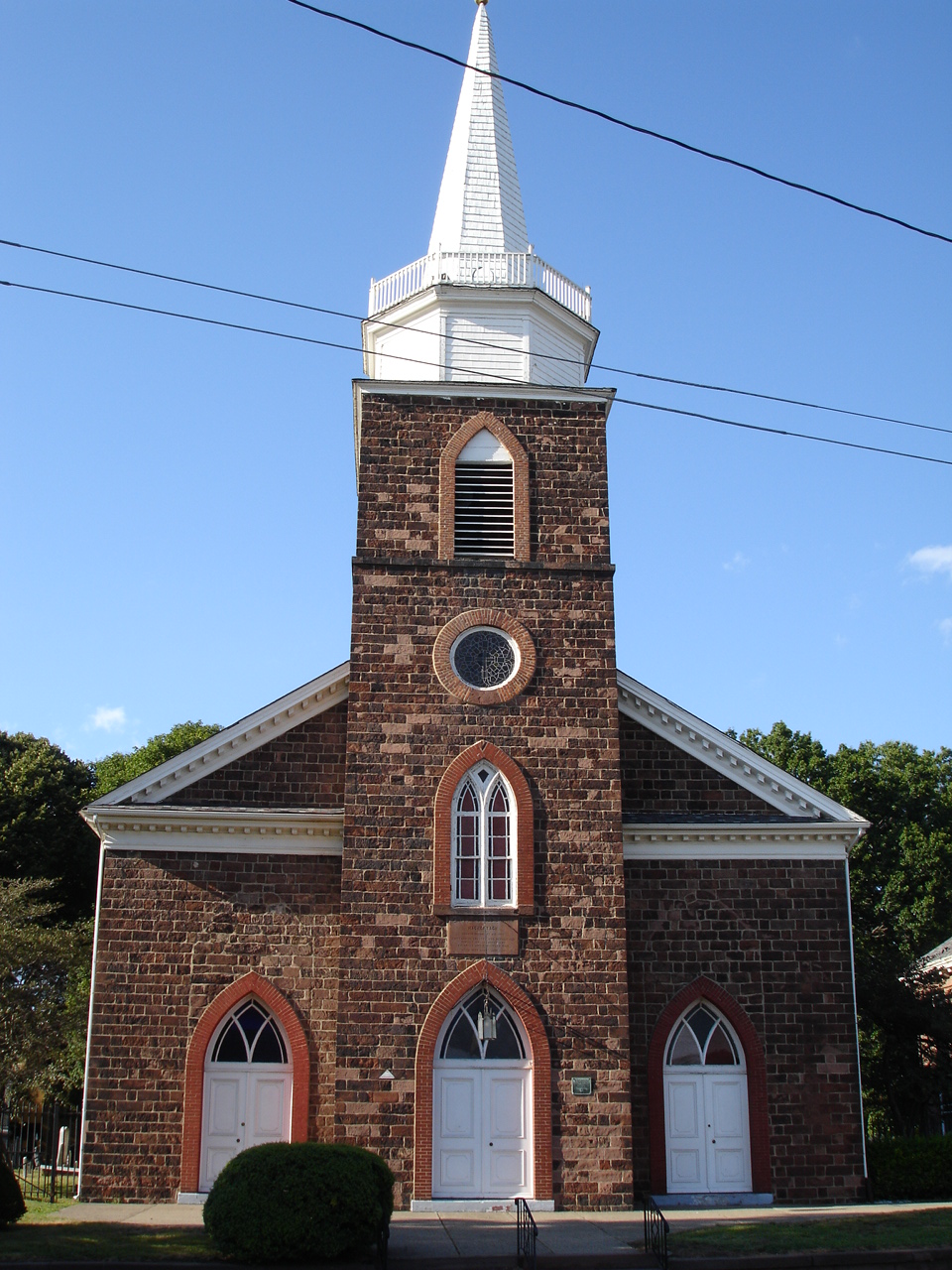
Hackensack's Church on The Green (First Reformed Dutch Church, Hackensack)

The city historian is Albert Dib. Walking tours are conducted of historic markers in downtown Hackensack, in and around The Green and lower Main Street, and a virtual historic walking tour is available as far north as the Pascack Valley Line crossing at Main Street.

The First Dutch Reformed Church ("Church on The Green") was built in 1696. In 1696 Major Berry donated land for the First Dutch Reformed Church, erected in that same year, which still stands in Hackensack today as the oldest church in Bergen County and the second oldest church in New Jersey. The following is list of notable people buried in the Church's adjoining cemetery:

- Enoch Poor, one of George Washington's officers.
- Richard Varick, former mayor of the city of New York and former New York Attorney General.

Bergen County's largest newspaper, The Record, a publication of the North Jersey Media Group, had been headquartered in Hackensack until moving to Woodland Park. Its 19.7-acre (8.0 ha) campus is largely abandoned and has been sold to be redeveloped for a mixed-use commercial project that would include 500 residential apartments and a hotel, in association with the river walkway project.

The New Jersey Naval Museum is home to the World War II submarine USS Ling, a Balao-class submarine, and several smaller water vessels and artifacts. The museum was open select weekdays for group tours. In July and August 2018, several individuals broke in to the submarine attempting to steal artifacts and caused extensive flooding that severely damaged the vessel.

The Hackensack Cultural Arts Center, located at 39 Broadway, is the city's leading theater arts institution and houses many local arts groups such as the Teaneck Theater Company and the Hackensack Theater Company. The facility also serves as the summer indoor location for the Hudson Shakespeare Company in case of rain. Otherwise, the group performs outdoors at Staib Park, with two "Shakespeare Wednesdays" per month for each month of the summer.

The Shops at Riverside (formerly known as Riverside Square Mall), is an upscale shopping center located at the intersection of Route 4 and Hackensack Avenue at the northern edge of the city along the Hackensack River near its border with River Edge to the north and with Teaneck across the river. The mall, which has undergone a significant expansion, is anchored by a number of high-end department stores and restaurants, including Bloomingdale's, Tiffany & Co., Pottery Barn and Barnes & Noble, offering a gross leasable area of 674,416 square feet (62,655.3 m^{2}). The mall also added an AMC Theatres dine-in movie theater on September 13, 2017, which replaced the former Saks Fifth Avenue store that opened in 1977 and closed down in 2014. The mall is known for its marble floors and attracts a great many upper-income shoppers from Manhattan and Northern Bergen County.

Hackensack's Main Street is devoted to shopping and includes some of the city's iconic landmarks, including the United Jersey Bank headquarters building and the former Woolworth site that is now a housewares store. The only remaining major store on Hackensack's Main Street had been Sears Roebuck and Co., which was located on the corner of Main and Anderson Streets. In July 2020, Sears announced that it would close its store in Hackensack. The site is close to the Anderson Street train station, and has been open since the 1930s.

Bergen County Jail is a detention center for both sentenced and unsentenced prisoners. It is located on South River Street. The County is in the process of moving the County Police from the northern end of the city to a new site across from the Jail. The former site will be redeveloped as a "transit village" complex associated with the New Bridge Landing station in adjoining River Edge.

The city's Johnson Public Library at 274 Main Street is a member of Bridging Communities, Connecting Library Services. The library opened in 1901 with a gift from State Senator William M. Johnson.

Ice House is a complex with four full-sized skating rinks that opened in 1996. It is home to the New Jersey Avalanche mainstreamed and special needs hockey teams and several high school hockey teams, in addition to being the home rink of gold medalists Sarah Hughes, Elena Bereznaia and Anton Sikharulidze. At the 2018 Winter Olympics, there were 11 Olympic figure skaters—from Israel, Switzerland, Slovakia, Canada and Australia—who trained at the Ice House for the ladies' singles, men's singles, pairs and ice dance competitions.

Other points of interest within the city include the Hackensack University Medical Center, Hackensack River County Park, Bowler City Bowling Lanes, Borg's Woods Nature Preserve, the Bergen County Court House and the Bergen Museum of Art & Science.

== Local media ==
Radio station WNYM at 970 AM, is licensed to Hackensack and has its transmitter in the city. The station is currently owned by Salem Communications with a conservative talk radio format. After five years as a country music station, the station switched its call letters to WWDJ and started playing a Top 40 radio format starting in July 1971, competing with Top 40 powerhouse 77 WABC. The station, then the county's only commercial radio station, switched to religious broadcasting in April 1974.

== Notable people ==
People who were born in, residents of, or otherwise closely associated with Hackensack include:

- Ahmad Al-Qaq (born 2002), professional soccer midfielder for the USL Championship club North Carolina FC
- Enzo Amore (born 1986 as Eric Arndt), former professional wrestler who worked for WWE
- Phil Arnold (1909–1968), actor
- Cheryl Arrowsmith (born 1959), structural biologist who is the chief scientist at the Toronto laboratory of the Structural Genomics Consortium
- Carol Arthur (1935–2020), actress who played a number of supporting roles in films by Mel Brooks
- Pete Athas (1946–2015), cornerback who played for the New York Giants during his six NFL seasons
- Janet Aulisio, artist whose work has appeared in role-playing games and on the covers of books and magazines
- Barton Lidice Beneš (1942–2012), artist
- Ellsworth P. Bertholf (1866–1921), Commandant of the Coast Guard from 1915 to 1919
- John H. Beyer (1933–2026), architect who was a founding partner of Beyer Blinder Belle and an advocate for historic preservation of the architecture of New York City
- Hubert Birkenmeier (born 1949), soccer player, coach, and businessman
- James Black (1800–1872), blacksmith who is credited with creating the Bowie knife
- David Boll (born 1953), cyclist who competed in the individual road race event at the 1976 Summer Olympics
- Debby Boone (born 1956), singer
- Warren Boroson (1935–2023), author and journalist
- Adam Boyd (1746–1835), represented New Jersey in Congress from 1803 to 1805, and again from 1808 to 1813
- Glenn Britt (1949–2014), CEO of Time Warner Cable from 2001 to December 2013
- David Brock (born 1962), Neo-Liberal political operative, author and commentator who founded the media watchdog group Media Matters for America
- Hector Luis Bustamante (born 1972), Colombian-American actor
- Oleksii Bychenko (born 1988), Ukrainian-born Israeli Olympic figure skater who competed at the 2018 Winter Olympics
- Cody Calafiore (born 1990), reality television personality who was runner up on Big Brother 16
- Frank Capsouras (born 1947), weightlifter who represented the United States in the men's heavyweight event at the 1972 Summer Olympics
- Philip Carey (1925–2009), actor who starred in One Life to Live
- George Cassedy (1783–1842), member of the United States House of Representatives from New Jersey who served from 1821 to 1827
- Brian Cina, politician who serves in the Vermont House of Representatives
- Vinny Ciurciu (born 1980), linebacker who has played in the NFL with the Tampa Bay Buccaneers, Carolina Panthers, Minnesota Vikings and Detroit Lions
- Paul Clemence, photo-artist
- Austen Crehore (1893–1962), World War I pilot in the Armée de l'Air and the recipient of the Legion of Honor and Croix de Guerre with two palms
- Erin C. Conaton (born 1970), former United States Under Secretary of Defense for Personnel and Readiness and Under Secretary of the Air Force
- Dave Davis (1942–2022), professional ten-pin bowler; 1967 PBA Player of the Year and PBA Hall of Famer
- Christopher Dell (born 1956), diplomat who served as the United States Ambassador to Kosovo, Angola and Zimbabwe
- Anthony DiCosmo (born 1977), gridiron football player
- Harold Dow (1947–2010), correspondent on 48 Hours
- Peter Dykstra (1957–2024), Greenpeace activist and a CNN environment correspondent
- Nathan Farb (1941–2026), photographer
- Douglas M. Fasciale (born 1960), lawyer who serves as a justice of the Supreme Court of New Jersey
- John Fenn (1917–2010), chemist who was a co-winner of the Nobel Prize in Chemistry in 2002 for his work in mass spectrometry
- F. Scott Fitzgerald, went to the prep school, the Newman School, in Hackensack in 1911
- Jim Finn (born 1976), New York Giants fullback
- Dave Fiore (born 1974), offensive lineman for the San Francisco 49ers and the Washington Redskins
- Percy Keese Fitzhugh (1876–1950), author of many popular children's books
- Silvia Fontana (born 1976), figure skater who represented Italy at the 2006 Winter Olympics in Turin
- Chet Forte (1935–1996), television director and sports radio talk show host
- Donald Frankos (1938–2011), contract killer and mob associate of the Lucchese crime family
- Bob Franks (1951–2010), represented New Jersey's 7th congressional district from 1993–2001
- Mike Fratello (born 1947), NBA coach and TV commentator
- Dean Gallo (1935–1994), represented New Jersey's 11th congressional district from 1985 until his death
- Elene Gedevanishvili (born 1990), figure skater who represented the nation of Georgia at the 2010 Winter Olympics in Vancouver
- Norm Gigon (1938–2013), utility player who played for the Chicago Cubs in 1967
- Doug Glanville (born 1970), writer, broadcaster and former MLB outfielder who played for the Philadelphia Phillies, Chicago Cubs and the Texas Rangers;
- Junior Glymph (born 1980), linebacker who played in the NFL for the Atlanta Falcons and Dallas Cowboys
- Navarro Gray (born 1979), lawyer best known for his accomplishments in the entertainment industry, including representing Fetty Wap
- David Grisman (born 1945), mandolin player
- John Groninga (born 1945), politician who served in the Iowa House of Representatives from the 20th district from 1983 to 1993
- Bill Hands (1940–2017), former Major League Baseball pitcher who played for the Chicago Cubs during his 11-year career
- Chet Hanulak (1933–2021), former NFL running back who played for four seasons for the Cleveland Browns
- Harry Harper (1895–1963), Major League Baseball pitcher from 1913 to 1923
- Archibald C. Hart (1873–1935), represented New Jersey's 6th congressional district from 1912 to 1913 and from 1913 to 1917
- Matt Herr (born 1976), ice hockey forward who played for parts of four NHL seasons
- Henry Kent Hewitt (1887–1972), United States Navy commander of amphibious operations in North Africa and southern Europe throughout World War II
- John Huyler (1808–1870), represented New Jersey's 4th congressional district in the United States House of Representatives from 1857 to 1859
- Mark Ingram II (born 1989), anchor for Fox Sports who was a Heisman Trophy winning running back and played for 12 years in the NFL
- Connor Jaeger (born 1991), competition swimmer who specializes in distance freestyle events
- Howie Janotta (1924–2010), professional basketball player who played for the Baltimore Bullets in 9 games during the 1949–50 NBA season
- Al Jochim (1902–1980), gymnast who won two silver medals in gymnastics at the 1932 Summer Olympics in Los Angeles
- Eric Karros (born 1967), Major League Baseball player and TV commentator
- Lena Kleinschmidt (1835–after 1886), German-born New York criminal who was a prominent jewel thief during the late 19th century
- Hailey Kops (born 2002), Israeli pair skater
- Louis F. Kosco (born 1932), politician who served in both the New Jersey General Assembly and the New Jersey Senate
- Harvey M. Krueger (1929–2017), investment banker who was CEO and President of Kuhn, Loeb & Co.
- Marc Kudisch (born 1966), stage actor
- Lauren Lake (born 1969), lawyer and presiding judge of Lauren Lake's Paternity Court
- Rich LeFurgy (born c. 1956), advertising consultant and investor
- Coi Leray (born 1997), rapper and songwriter
- William Alexander Linn (1846–1917), journalist and historian
- John Maessner (born 1969), soccer player and coach who played six seasons in Major League Soccer
- Roger Mandle (1941–2020), art historian, curator and academic administrator, who was president of the Rhode Island School of Design
- Hugh McCracken (1942–2013), rock guitarist and session musician
- James McEachin (1930–2025), actor and author
- Earl Schenck Miers (1910–1972), historian who wrote extensively about the American Civil War
- E. Frederic Morrow (c. 1906–1994), the first African American to hold an executive position at the White House, when he served President Dwight Eisenhower as Administrative Officer for Special Projects from 1955 to 1961
- John H. Morrow (1910–2000), diplomat, who was appointed by President Dwight Eisenhower in 1959 as the first Ambassador to independent Guinea
- Herman Neilson (1907–1978), college football, college basketball, and tennis coach
- Don Nelson (1927–2013), screenwriter, film producer and jazz musician, best known for his work on the sitcom The Adventures of Ozzie and Harriet
- Richard Cooper Newick (1926–2013), multihull sailboat designer
- Donald Nichols (1923–1992), United States Air Force officer who worked in military intelligence
- Dan Oates (born 1955), police chief of Miami Beach, Florida
- Frederick Albion Ober (1849–1913), naturalist and writer
- Danny Oquendo (born 1987), wide receiver who played for the Maryland Terrapins football team
- Deborah Oropallo (born 1954), artist who is best known for her digital montages
- William A. Pailes (born 1952), United States Air Force astronaut in the Manned Spaceflight Engineer Program during the mid-1980s whi served as a Payload Specialist on STS-51-J Atlantis (October 3–7, 1985)
- John B. Paolella (born 1949), politician who represented the 38th Legislative District in both houses of the New Jersey Legislature
- Nellie Morrow Parker (1902–1998), first African American school teacher in Bergen County, New Jersey, and the namesake of Nellie K. Parker Elementary School
- Randi Patterson (born 1985), former professional soccer player
- Randolph E. Paul (1890–1956), lawyer specializing in tax law who has been credited as "...an architect of the modern tax system"
- Bill Peck (c. 1927–2017), football player and coach who was head coach of the Middle Tennessee Blue Raiders football team in the 1970s
- Melissa Perello (born 1976), chef
- Stan Pitula (1931–1965), right-handed pitcher who played for the Cleveland Indians
- Charles Lane Poor (1866–1951), astronomy professor, noted for his opposition to Albert Einstein's theory of relativity
- Willie Prall (born 1950), pitcher who appeared in three games in 1950 for the Chicago Cubs
- George Prevost (1767–1816), British Army officer and colonial administrator
- Jahvon Quinerly (born 1998), college basketball player for the Alabama Crimson Tide men's basketball team
- Alice Huyler Ramsey (1886–1983), first woman to drive across the United States from coast to coast
- John R. Ramsey (1862–1933), politician who represented New Jersey's 6th congressional district in the United States House of Representatives from 1917 to 1921
- David Remnick (born 1958), journalist, writer, and magazine editor who won a Pulitzer Prize in 1994 for his book Lenin's Tomb: The Last Days of the Soviet Empire
- Hezly Rivera (born 2008), artistic gymnast
- Joe Rizzo (born 1998), professional baseball third baseman
- John Anthony Rodriguez (born 2000), musician, who performs as "54 Ultra" and is best known for his smooth, Latin soul-influenced vocals
- Eric Rogers (born 2002), professional football cornerback who plays in the NFL for the Los Angeles Chargers
- Nicholas Romayne (1756–1817), physician
- Hatch Rosdahl (1941–2004), football player who played for the Buffalo Bills and Kansas City Chiefs
- Jason Rullo (born 1972), professional drummer, one of the founding members of progressive metal band Symphony X
- Alfred D. Schiaffo (1920–1988), politician who served in the New Jersey Senate from the 13th district from 1968 to 1973
- Wally Schirra (1923–2007), NASA astronaut, one of the original seven astronauts chosen for Project Mercury
- Walter G. Schroeder (1927–2021), politician who was a member of the Oregon House of Representatives from 1985 to 1993
- Dave Scott (born 1953), offensive lineman who played for the Atlanta Falcons
- Chris Smalls (born 1988), labor organizer known for his role in leading Amazon worker organization in the New York City borough of Staten Island
- Robert Stiles (born 1959), field hockey player who competed in the men's tournament at the 1984 Summer Olympics
- Adel Tankova (born 2000), Ukrainian-born Israeli Olympic figure skater who competed at the 2018 Winter Olympics
- Warren Terhune (1869–1920), United States Navy Commander and the 13th Governor of American Samoa
- Russell Thacher (1919–1990), author and film producer who co-produced the films Soylent Green and The Last Hard Men together with Walter Seltzer
- Jim Tullis (1941–2017), politician who served as a member of the Florida House of Representatives
- Joe Lynn Turner (born 1951), singer
- Rudy Van Gelder (1924–2016), recording engineer who taped many jazz albums for Blue Note Records in his Hackensack recording studio in the 1950s
- Richard Varick (1753–1831), lawyer and politician
- Charles H. Voorhis (1833–1896), lawyer and judge from New Jersey who served one term representing New Jersey's 5th congressional district
- Douglas Watt (1914–2009), theater critic for the New York Daily News
- Teresa Weatherspoon (born 1965), professional basketball player, formerly with WNBA's New York Liberty
- Leslie West (1945–2020), rock guitarist, vocalist, and songwriter who is best known as a founding member of the hard rock band Mountain
- William B. Widnall (1906–1983), member of the United States House of Representatives for 24 years representing New Jersey's 7th congressional district
- Anna Wessels Williams (1863–1954), physician who worked as a bacteriologist at the first U.S. municipal diagnostic laboratory, helped develop the diphtheria antitoxin and was the first woman to be elected chair of the laboratory section of the American Public Health Association
- Bill Willoughby (born 1957), basketball player who, along with Darryl Dawkins, were the first high school players drafted by the NBA after they graduated in 1975
- Chris Wragge (born 1970), news anchor for WCBS-TV
- Ronald Zilberberg (born 1996), Israeli Olympic figure skater who competed at the 2018 Winter Olympics
- Ken Zisa (born 1954), politician who served as a member of the New Jersey General Assembly from 1994 to 2002, where he represented the 37th Legislative District

== Sources ==
- Municipal Incorporations of the State of New Jersey (according to Counties) prepared by the Division of Local Government, Department of the Treasury (New Jersey); December 1, 1958.
- Clayton, W. Woodford; and Nelson, Nelson. History of Bergen and Passaic Counties, New Jersey, with Biographical Sketches of Many of its Pioneers and Prominent Men. Philadelphia: Everts and Peck, 1882.
- Harvey, Cornelius Burnham (ed.), Genealogical History of Hudson and Bergen Counties, New Jersey. New York: New Jersey Genealogical Publishing Co., 1900.
- Lark, Terry (editor), Hackensack – Heritage to Horizons, The Hackensack Bicentennial Committee, The City of Hackensack, 1976
- Van Valen, James M. History of Bergen County, New Jersey. New York: New Jersey Publishing and Engraving Co., 1900.
- Westervelt, Frances A. (Frances Augusta), 1858–1942, History of Bergen County, New Jersey, 1630–1923, Lewis Historical Publishing Company, 1923.
