= Bergen County Court House =

Municipal edifice in New Jersey, US

- Bergen County Court House Complex
- U.S. National Register of Historic Places
- New Jersey Register of Historic Places
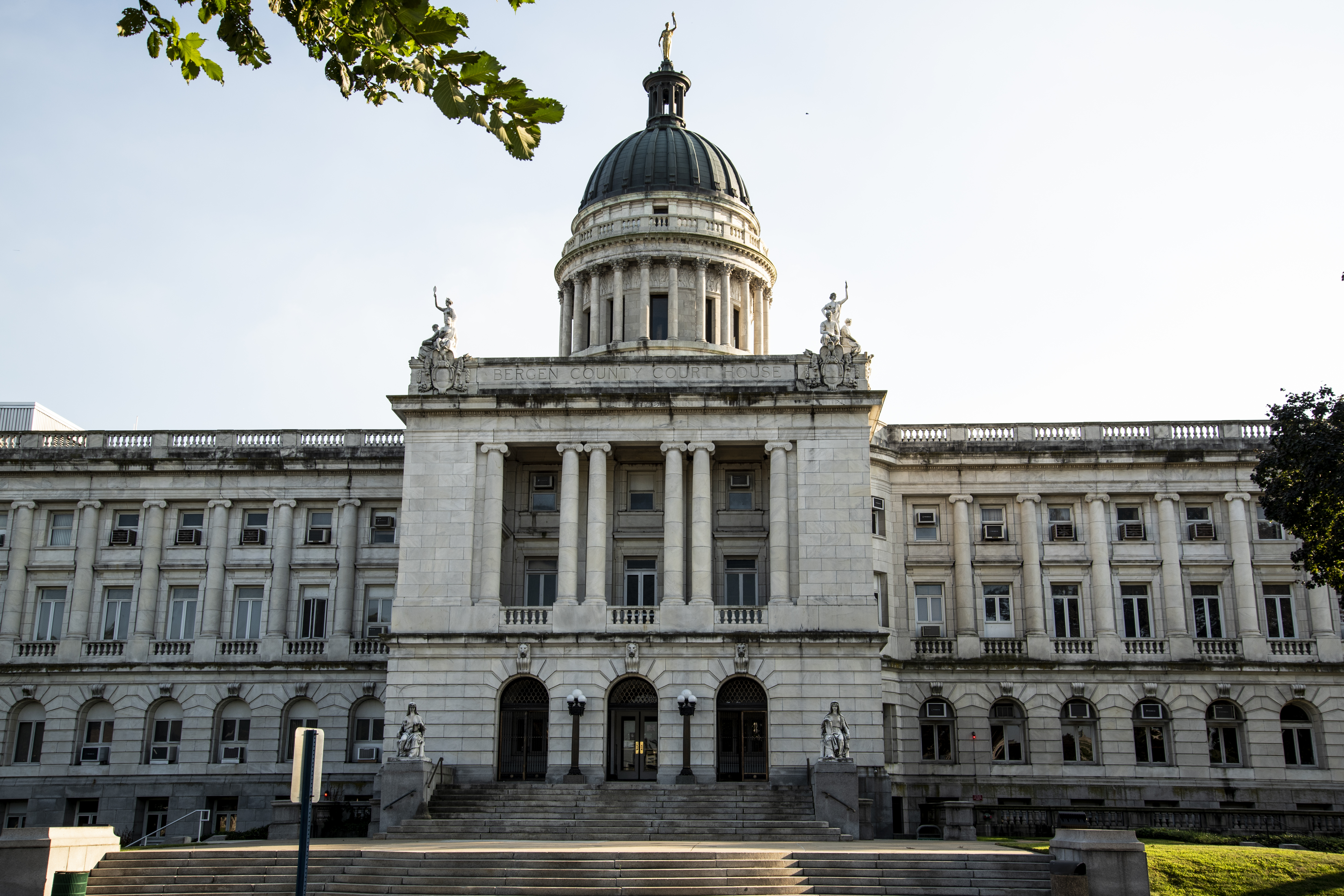
- The Bergen County Court House

- Location within Bergen County, New Jersey Location within New Jersey Location within the United States
- Location: Court, Main and Essex Streets, Hackensack, New Jersey
- Coordinates: 40°52′41″N 74°02′38″W
- Area: 5.9 acres (2.4 ha)
- Built: 1910—1912
- Architect: James Riely Gordon
- Architectural style: Late 19th And 20th Century Revivals
- NRHP reference No.: 83001468
- NJRHP No.: 520

Significant dates
- Added to NRHP: January 11, 1983
- Designated NJRHP: November 22, 1982

Bergen County, the most populous county in the U.S. state of New Jersey, has had a series of courthouses. The current one stands in Hackensack.

== History ==
The current Bergen County Courthouse is not the first courthouse but actually the sixth courthouse built for Bergen County. In 1683, four counties were created in East Jersey—Bergen, Essex, Middlesex, and Monmouth. In 1710, Hackensack became the county seat of Bergen. In 1715, the first courthouse was built three blocks from the current courthouse. The courthouse also housed a jail. The second courthouse was built in 1734 near the “Green”, but was burned by the British in 1780 during the Revolutionary War. The third courthouse, a log building, was then built in Oakland. This was considered a temporary location and the courthouse later moved to the home of John Hopper in Ho-Ho-Kus. After the war, the courthouse was moved to the house of Archibald Campbell of Hackensack.

Freeholder Peter Zabriskie later donated land near his Hackensack home located at the northeast corner of Main and Bridge Streets, and in 1786, a new courthouse and jail opened. Peter Zabriskie's home, called “The Mansion” was also called “Washington’s Headquarters” because George Washington frequently was a guest there. Years later the Mansion became a hotel. The Mansion was then torn down in 1945. In 1822, due to space limitations, a new courthouse was built at the location of the current courthouse and it was utilized for over 90 years.

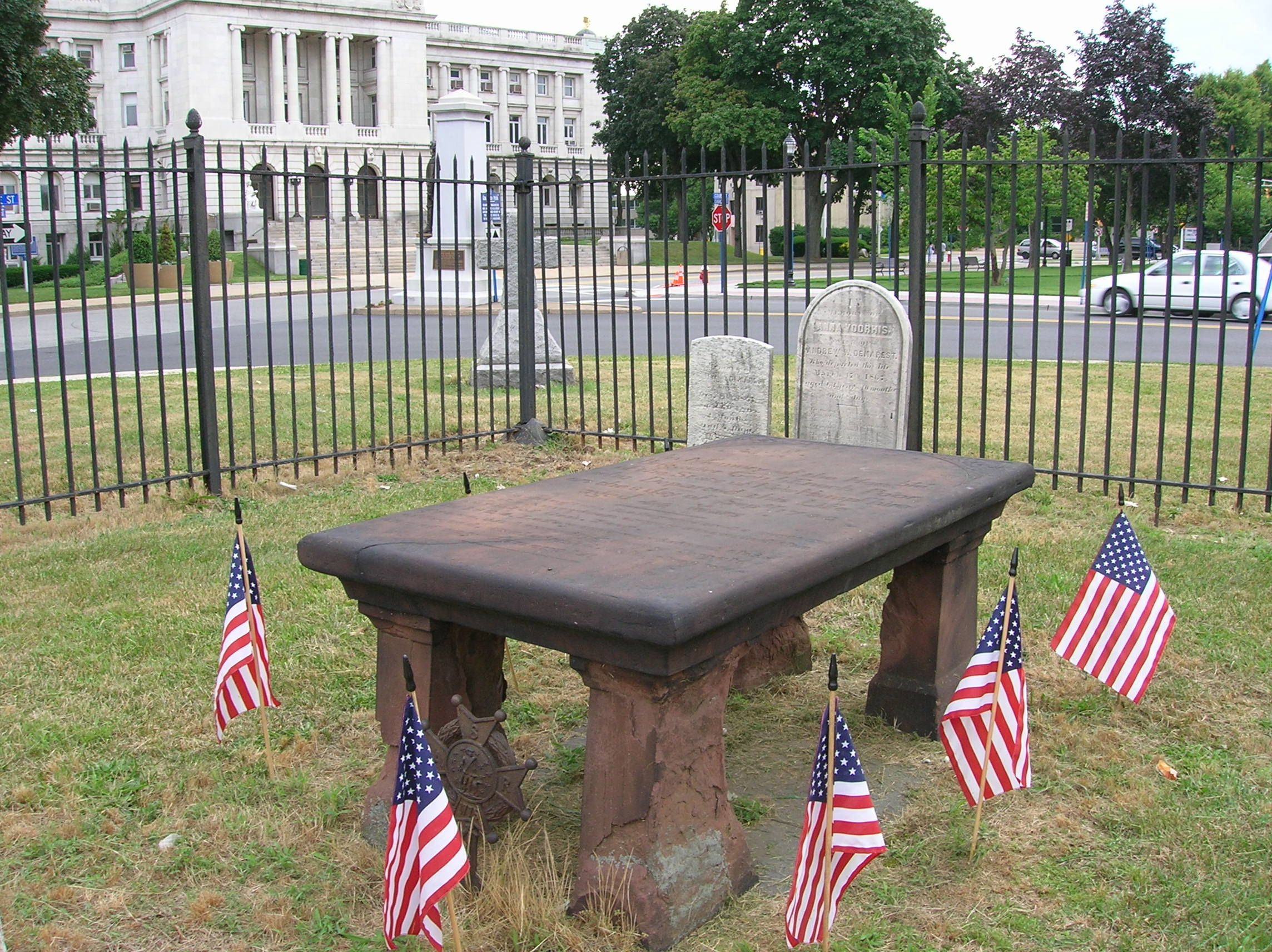
Enoch Poor's burial site. Bergen County Court House is in the background.

The current courthouse is the sixth Bergen County courthouse. James Riely Gordon, a civil engineer, born in Winchester, Virginia, won a competition to design the Bergen County courthouse. The style of the courthouse building is known as American Renaissance. Construction began in 1910 and was completed in 1912 at a cost of one million dollars. The jail was also completed in 1912, the style of the jail being Medieval Revival. The courthouse was placed on both the New Jersey and National Registers of Historic Places in 1982 and 1983, respectively.

The Green is a public square located across the street from the courthouse at the corner of Main Street and Court Street. On the west side of the green is a marker showing where the second courthouse stood before it was burned by the British in 1780. A bronze statue is located at the intersection of Court Street and Washington Place. This statue is of General Enoch Poor. General Poor, a New Hampshire native, was a hero at the Battle of Saratoga in 1777. General Poor served under General Washington. He was in New Jersey organizing an army to raid New York City. General Poor died in 1780 and is buried across the street from the Green at the Dutch Reformed Church. General Washington and the Marquis de Lafayette attended General Poor's funeral.

== Construction ==
The interior dome of the rotunda area of the courthouse is modeled after the Pantheon in Rome. On the first floor of the rotunda building there was a fountain. The fountain was removed in 1930. In the 1930s as part of the Works Progress Administration (WPA), murals were painted in courtrooms 253 and 352. In the early 1940s an additional mural was added in courtroom 357. All three murals were designed by Teaneck resident William Winter. The murals in room 352 (formerly known as the Supreme Court Room) represent the roots of American Law. The murals in room 253 (formerly known as the Freeholder Chambers) represent local historical sights. The murals in room 357 (formerly known as the Circuit Court Chamber) represent Roman Law. There are four stained glass skylights in the rotunda building. The first is located in the rotunda dome and it measures eight feet in diameter. Eight trapezoidal sections carry the name of a historically significant English or American jurist. The three remaining skylights contain the Bergen County seal. The glass utilized for these skylights was made by M.J. Lamb. The interior of the rotunda and its courtrooms were treated with marble, scagliola, bronze and cast iron.

The exterior walls of the courthouse rotunda building were made from Vermont marble. On top of the dome is a copper figure entitled “Enlightenment Giving Power” by Johannes Gelert. Around the drum of the dome is a relief consisting of forty panels that represent twelve tablets of the first Roman Law. Five bronze eagles adorn the balustrades on the corners of the building. The eagles and “Enlightenment” were resurfaced with gold leaf in 1994. There are four sculptures on the front of the rotunda building that faces Court Street. Two of the sculptures each contain three figures. The left group consists of Truth holding a mirror flanked by Justice and Integrity. The right group consists of Honor flanked by Law and Order. There are two statues located on the walls of the main steps. The left statue represents History and the right statue represents Law.

Construction for the Administration Building started in 1929 and was completed in 1933. The style of this building is called neoclassical. The exterior walls of the Administration Building were made from Arkansas limestone. The Annex building that joins the Administration Building with the rotunda building was completed in 1958.

== In popular culture ==
The historical charm of the courthouse has even caught the eye of Hollywood. Scenes from the following television shows and movies feature the courthouse:

=== Film ===
- Hackers
- Before and After
- The Devil's Advocate
- Changing Lanes

=== Television ===
- Law & Order

== See also ==
- County courthouses in New Jersey
- Richard J. Hughes Justice Complex
- Federal courthouses in New Jersey
- National Register of Historic Places listings in Bergen County, New Jersey
