= Adam Boyd (politician) =

American politician (1746–1835)

Adam Boyd (March 21, 1746 – August 15, 1835) was an American politician and jurist who served as a United States representative from New Jersey from 1803 to 1805, and from 1808 to 1813.

He was a slaveholder.

== Early life and career ==
Born in Mendham Township, he moved to Bergen County and to Hackensack a few years later.

=== Politics ===
He was a member of the Bergen County board of freeholders and justices in 1773, 1784, 1791, 1794, and 1798, and was sheriff of Bergen County from 1778 to 1781 and again in 1789. Boyd was a member of the New Jersey General Assembly in 1782, 1783, 1787, 1794, and 1795, and was judge of the Court of Common Pleas of Bergen County from 1803 to 1805.

== Congress ==
Boyd was elected as a Democratic-Republican to the Eighth Congress, serving from March 4, 1803, to March 3, 1805, and was elected to the Tenth Congress to fill the vacancy caused by the death of Ezra Darby. He was reelected to the Eleventh and Twelfth Congresses and served from March 8, 1808, to March 3, 1813. He was again judge of the court of common pleas from 1813 to 1833.

== Death ==
Boyd died in Hackensack, and was interred there in the First Reformed Dutch Church, Hackensack.

U.S. House of Representatives
Preceded by John Condit	Member of the U.S. House of Representatives from New Jersey's at-large congressional district March 4, 1803 – March 3, 1805	Succeeded by Ezra Darby
Preceded by Ezra Darby	Member of the U.S. House of Representatives from New Jersey's at-large congressional district March 8, 1808 – March 3, 1813	Succeeded by Ezra Baker
