= Midtown Bridge (Hackensack River) =

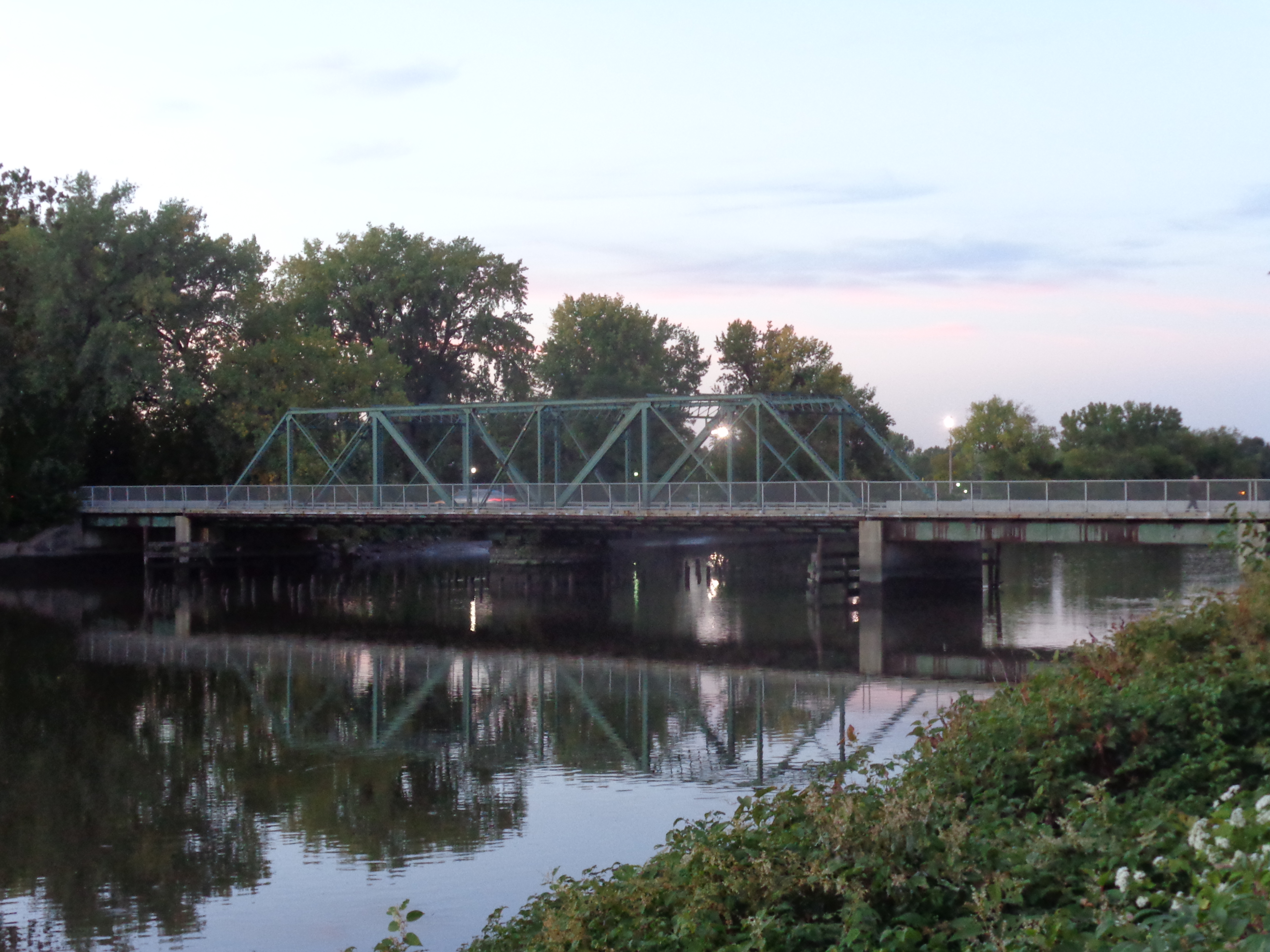
- Before 2017-18 reconstruction
- Coordinates: 40.88241°N 74.03596°W
- Carries: Salem Street; West Main Street
- Crosses: Hackensack River
- Locale: Hackensack and Bogota, New Jersey
- Other name(s): Salem Street Bridge; William C. Ryan Memorial Bridge
- Owner: Bergen County

Characteristics
- Design: Swing (fixed 1984)
- Material: Steel
- Total length: 321.9 ft (98.1 m)
- Width: 21.7 ft (6.6 m)
- Longest span: 70.9 ft (21.6 m)
- No. of spans: 3
- Clearance above: 14.0 ft (4.3 m)
- Clearance below: 3 ft (0.91 m) mean high water 8 ft (2.4 m) mean low water

History
- Constructed by: R.F. Long and Company
- Opened: 1900 2018 (replacement)
- Closed: 1998 (temporary); 2013 (temporary); 2017 (rebuilt)

Location
- Interactive map of Midtown Bridge

Midtown Bridge, also known as the Salem Street Bridge and William C. Ryan Memorial Bridge, crosses over the Hackensack River between Hackensack and Bogota, in Bergen County, New Jersey, United States. The through truss bridge was originally a swing bridge built in 1900 for trolleys. It became a road bridge in 1940 and its swing span was fixed in 1984. It was closed in 2017 and slated for replacement; the rebuilt bridge reopened in April 2018.

== History ==
The bridge was built in 1900 by F.R. Long and Company as a trolley bridge for the Bergen County Traction Company, which had opened in 1896. Steel for the bridge was provided by the Passaic Rolling Mill Company of Paterson. The bridge's original design was a through Pratt truss swing span on a stone center pier. It carried two sets of tracks, part of line running to Edgewater where there was connecting ferry service across the Hudson River to Manhattan. Various lines were consolidated in 1900 into the New Jersey and Hudson River Railway Company and in 1910 were sold to the Public Service Corporation as part of the Bergen Division which ran service between the ferry and the Broadway Terminal in Paterson.

Service was discontinued in 1938. The tracks were replaced with a steel deck and in 1940 the Midtown Bridge began carrying vehicular traffic. The swing span was closed for the passage of maritime vessels on February 4, 1978 and a rehabilitation project in 1984 fixed it in place and machinery was removed. As of 2014, Coast Guard rules required that the draw be made operable within 12 months after notification by the District Commander.

== Designation ==
In 1980, the bridge was designated the "Ryan Memorial Bridge," after Bogota resident and U.S. Marine Corps Lieutenant William C. Ryan, who was killed (MIA) during the Vietnam War in 1969. It was designated the Lt. William C Ryan (USMC) Memorial Bridge during a re-dedication of the bridge on April 21, 2018.

== Reconstruction ==
The Midtown Bridge was shut down for several weeks in 1998 by the Department of Public Works so that emergency repairs could be made to its steel joints, a situation described by county engineer Robert Mulder as "an ongoing problem that needs to be permanently fixed". A rehabilitation project closed the downriver Court Street Bridge from 2010 to 2012 and traffic diverted to the Midtown Bridge, which is believed to have suffered stresses due to the extra use. On October 17, 2013 the Midtown Bridge was temporarily shut down for emergency repairs again after Bogota’s Council President and Office of Emergency Management coordinator Tito Jackson noticed a large separation in the joints of bridge’s metal decking.

As of 2017 the bridge was slated for replacement. It was closed on March 16 and expected to be completed in November 2017. It reopened on April 20, 2018.

== See also ==
- List of crossings of the Hackensack River
- List of Public Service Railway lines
- List of county routes in Bergen County, New Jersey
- North Hudson County Railway
