= First Dutch Reformed Church, Hackensack =

Historic church in Bergen County, New Jersey, US

- Reformed Dutch Church and Green of Hackensack
- U.S. National Register of Historic Places
- U.S. Historic district
- New Jersey Register of Historic Places
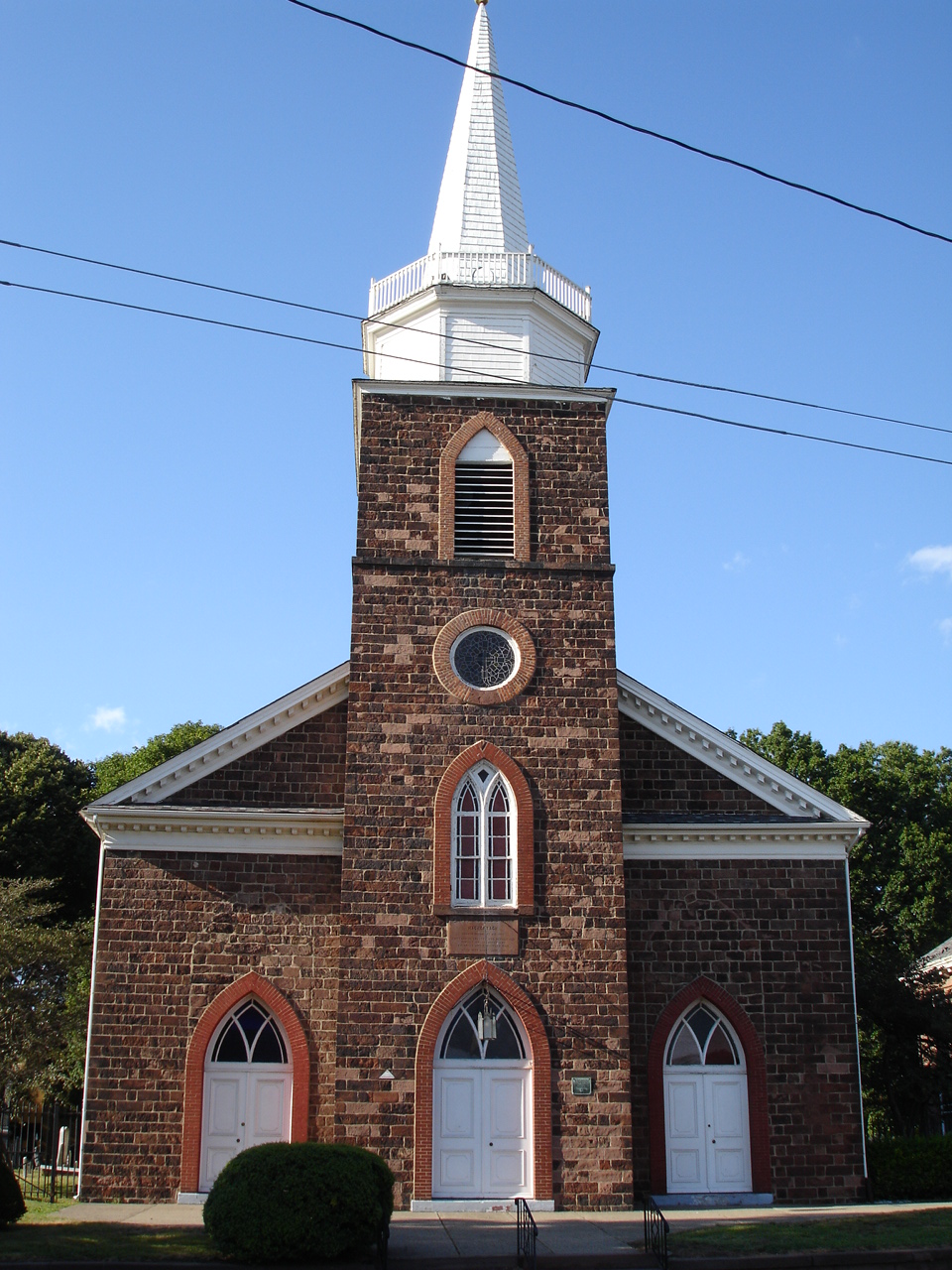
- Hackensack's Church On The Green

- Location within Bergen County, New Jersey Location within New Jersey Location within the United States
- Location: 42 Court Street, Hackensack, New Jersey
- Coordinates: 40°52′45″N 74°2′34″W
- Area: 1.6 acres (0.65 ha)
- Built: 1791
- Architectural style: Wrenn-Gibbs type
- NRHP reference No.: 83001546
- NJRHP No.: 523

Significant dates
- Added to NRHP: June 9, 1983
- Designated NJRHP: April 8, 1983

First Dutch Reformed Church, also known as the "Old Church on the Green", is located in Hackensack, New Jersey.

== History ==
It sits in the churchyard of the church by the same name, the current building being constructed in 1791. The east wall of the building is of particular interest because it incorporates several carved stones from the first church building erected on the site. These stones bear the monogram of several of the founding families. The congregation was founded by Dutch settlers in 1686. For the first ten years the congregation worshipped in various locations, and in 1696 the first building was built on the current site. In 1780 Colonial General Enoch Poor was buried in the Cemetery. George Washington and the Marquis de Lafayette attended the funeral. The church is the oldest extant church in Bergen County.

The church is adjacent to the Hackensack Green, which was originally church land and is one of the oldest public squares in New Jersey.

== Notable burials ==
- Adam Boyd (1746–1835) represented New Jersey in Congress from 1803 to 1805, and again from 1808 to 1813.
- George Cassedy (1783–1842), represented New Jersey in Congress from 1821 to 1827.
- Enoch Poor (1736–1780), one of George Washington’s officers.
- Richard Varick (1753–1831), former mayor of the city of New York and former New York Attorney General

== See also ==
- Bergen County Cemeteries
