= List of NJ Transit rolling stock =

NJ Transit Rail Operations (reporting mark NJTR), the rail division of NJ Transit, operates a fleet of 175 locomotives and over 1,200 passenger cars. This rolling stock is used to operate NJ Transit's network of 11 lines.

== Locomotives ==
=== Active revenue ===
These locomotives carry NJTR reporting marks for revenue service. Not included are the EMU cars, which are technically locomotives, but are listed in the passenger cars roster below.

Builder and model	Photo	Numbers	Built	Acquired	Type	Number active	Power	Notes
EMD GP40PH-2		4100–4101, 4109	1968	1983 (inherited at inception)	Diesel	3	3,000 hp (2,237 kW)	Ex-Central Railroad of New Jersey GP40P; Rebuilt by Conrail 1991–1993.; Last remaining units from a 13 engine order.; 4101 painted in heritage NJDOT scheme.; 4109 painted in heritage Central Railroad of New Jersey scheme.
EMD GP40PH-2B		4201–4219	1965–1969	1993–1994	Diesel	19	3,000 hp (2,237 kW)	Ex-Penn Central.; 4202 painted in Pennsylvania-Reading Seashore Lines heritage paint Scheme.; 4208 painted in Conrail heritage paint scheme.; 4210 painted in Erie Railroad heritage paint scheme.; 4219 was rebuilt from GP40PH-2A 4148, which was damaged in 1996.; Units (including the EMD GP40PH-2 units) can be found on the Main/Bergen County, Pascack Valley, and Atlantic City lines. Additionally, they can be found on the Morristown and Montclair Boonton lines on trains to/from Hackettstown, Mount Olive, and Lake Hopatcong, plus Dover on Montclair Boonton line trains
EMD F40PH-2CAT		4119–4120	1981		Diesel	2	3,000 hp (2,237 kW)	Used for work and passenger service.; Last remaining units from a 17 engine order.; Units can be found on the Main/Bergen County, and Pascack Valley lines. Additionally, they can be found on the Morristown and Montclair Boonton lines on trains to/from Hackettstown, Mount Olive, and Lake Hopatcong, plus Dover on Montclair Boonton line trains
Alstom PL42AC		4000–4032	2005–2006		Diesel	29	4,200 hp (3,132 kW); 3,680 hp (2,744 kW) available for traction	Some units to be replaced, remaining units to be given light overhauls.; Units can be found on the Main/Bergen County, Pascack Valley, and occasionally, the Raritan Valley line during off-peak hours if there's a gap in equipment availability
Bombardier ALP-46		4600–4628	2001–2002		Electric	29	7,100 hp (5,294 kW)	Purchased for Midtown Direct service.; 4609 wrapped in Ride With Pride scheme; 4636 wrapped in heritage Pennsylvania Railroad scheme; 4640 wrapped in heritage "disco stripe" scheme; Units can be found on the NEC, NJCL, Morristown, Montclair Boonton, and Gladstone (branch) lines
Bombardier ALP-46A		4629–4664	2010–2011		Electric	36	7,500 hp (5,593 kW)	Purchased for Midtown Direct service.; 4609 wrapped in Ride With Pride scheme; 4636 wrapped in heritage Pennsylvania Railroad scheme; 4640 wrapped in heritage "disco stripe" scheme; Units can be found on the NEC, NJCL, Morristown, Montclair Boonton, and Gladstone (branch) lines
Bombardier ALP-45DP		4500–4534	2011–2012		Dual-mode (electric and diesel)	35	Electric mode 5,365 hp (4,001 kW) Diesel mode 4,200 hp (3,132 kW); 3,000 hp (2,237 kW) available for traction	4502 wrapped in commemorative Armed Forces scheme.; 4503 wrapped in commemorative scheme celebrating the 100th anniversary of the founding of Atlas Model Railroad.; 4506 wrapped in commemorative scheme for Autism Acceptance Month.; 4508 wrapped in commemorative scheme for Black History Month.; 4519 wrapped in heritage Erie Lackawanna Railroad scheme.; 4526 wrapped in commemorative scheme celebrating the 250th anniversary of the United States of America.; Several units have commemorative stickers for branches of the United States military and first responders.; Units are found on every line in the system (except for the Atlantic City line), including the Doordash shuttle to Meadowlands, due to its capability of operating on both electric and diesel power
Bombardier/Alstom ALP-45A		4535–4571	2021–present		Dual-mode (electric and diesel)	25 (12 on order)	Electric mode 5,365 hp (4,001 kW) Diesel mode 4,200 hp (3,132 kW); 3,000 hp (2,237 kW) available for traction	Option for 17 locomotives exercised in December 2017; increased to 25 in July 2020. A further 12 locomotives were ordered in May 2025.; Units are found on every line in the system (except for the Atlantic City line), including the Doordash shuttle to Meadowlands, due to its capability of operating on both electric and diesel power

=== Retired revenue ===
Builder and model	Photo	Numbers	Built	Acquired (by NJT)	Retired	Type	Power	Notes
EMD F40PH-2CAT		4113–4118, 4121–4129	1981		2014	Diesel	3,000 hp (2,237 kW)	Replaced by ALP-45DP.; Two retained for work and passenger service.; Two sold to the Grand Canyon Railway; Few sold to Bruggere and Monson (BUGX) and based in Stockton, California.
GE U34CH		4151–4183	1970–1971	1976	1994	Diesel	3,600 hp (2,700 kW)	Replaced by GP40PH-2A and GP40PH-2B.; 4172 is preserved.
EMD GP40FH-2		4130–4144	1966–1967	1987	2012	Diesel	3,000 hp (2,237 kW)	Rebuilt by Morrison-Knudsen with the frame of a standard GP40 and cowl of an F45.; Replaced by ALP-45DP.
EMD GP40PH-2A		4145–4150	1967–1971	1992–1993	2014	Diesel	3,000 hp (2,237 kW)	4148 was wrecked in 1996 and was rebuilt as GP40PH-2B 4219.; Replaced by ALP-45DP.; 4145 sold to MARC
GE P40DC		4800–4803	1993	2007	2015	Diesel	4,250 hp (3,170 kW)	Former Amtrak units; Sold to CDOT for CT Rail; Used on the Atlantic City Express Service (ACES) to push/pull on between Frankford Junction and Atlantic City Rail Terminal. After it was discontinued, it was transferred to Raritan yard for service on the Raritan Valley line.
ABB ALP-44		4400–4414	1989	1990	2011	Electric	7000 hp (5.2 MW)	Replaced by the Bombardier ALP-46.; 4424 is preserved.; Used on the Atlantic City Express Service (ACES), to push pull the train from Frankford Junction to Penn Station New York
ABB ALP-44E		4415–4419	1995		2012	Electric	7000 hp (5.2 MW)	Replaced by the Bombardier ALP-46.; 4424 is preserved.; Used on the Atlantic City Express Service (ACES), to push pull the train from Frankford Junction to Penn Station New York
ABB ALP-44M		4420–4431	1996		2011	Electric	7000 hp (5.2 MW)	Replaced by the Bombardier ALP-46.; 4424 is preserved.; Used on the Atlantic City Express Service (ACES), to push pull the train from Frankford Junction to Penn Station New York
GE E60CH		958–973	1973	1984	1998	Electric	6,000 hp (4.5 MW)	Purchased from Amtrak.; 958 is preserved; Stored out of service mid 1991 but not officially retired until 1998
GE/Altoona Works GG1		4872–4884	1934–1943	N/A	1983	Electric	4,620 hp (3,450 kW)–8,500 hp (6,300 kW)	Ex-Pennsylvania Railroad.
EMD F7A		417–418, 420, 422–425	1949–1952		1984	Diesel	1,500 hp (1,100 kW)	
EMD E8A		4246, 4248–4249, 4251, 4253, 4256–4258, 4267, 4272, 4285, 4305, 4320–4328, 4330–4334	1950–1953		1987	Diesel	2,250 hp (1,678 kW)	
EMD F40PHR		270, 274, 293, 302, 311, 400	1975–1992	2003	2005	Diesel	3,000–3,200 hp (2.2–2.4 MW)	Ex-Amtrak.

=== Non-revenue ===
All non-revenue locomotives are diesel-powered and legally carry the same "NJTR" AAR reporting marks as all other equipment without exception. As these locomotives lack HEP (the ability to power the trailers they're hauling), they do not haul trains in revenue service unless performing a rescue.

Model	Photo	Numbers	Year(s)	Notes
EMD GP40-2		4300–4303	1965–1968	Ex-Conrail and New York Central. Mainly used for Yard Service and Equipment moves
EMD GP40PH-2		4102–4108, 4110–4112	1968	Modified for non-revenue use and are now mechanically standard GP40-2s.; 4105, 4110, and 4112 remain unmodified.
MotivePower MP20B-3		1001–1005	2008	Rebuilt from 1967 EMD GP40FH-2s 4130–4134.

== Multiple units ==
These trains are self-propelled, meaning they power themselves and don't require a locomotive for traction and HEP.

Builder and model	Photo	Numbers	Total	Built	Notes
GE Arrow III		1304–1333	30 single cars (no lavatory)	1977	Single car Arrow III units are GE Model MA-1J, married pairs are GE Model MA-1H.; 160 cars are in revenue service.; Rebuilt 1992–1995 by ABB; 1319 features heritage Lackawanna Railroad decals.; 1502–1503 feature heritage Penn Central decals.
GE Arrow III		1334–1533	200 paired cars (lavatory in odd cars)	1977	Single car Arrow III units are GE Model MA-1J, married pairs are GE Model MA-1H.; 160 cars are in revenue service.; Rebuilt 1992–1995 by ABB; 1319 features heritage Lackawanna Railroad decals.; 1502–1503 feature heritage Penn Central decals.
Bombardier MultiLevel Coach III		8000–8099	100 unpowered cab cars (lavatory)	2024–2029	NJ Transit awarded Bombardier a $670 million contract for the construction of an initial 113-car order in December 2018, with deliveries expected to begin in early to mid-2026 and entry into service in the same year. The contract includes options for up to 636 more cars, 25 of which were exercised in February 2022 for an additional $74.1 million.; An additional 36 options were exercised in July 2024 for $170 million.; An additional 200 options were exercised in May 2025 for $1.496 billion, with a further 50 option cars to be decided on at a later date.; Cars slated to replace Arrow III multiple units, remaining single level fleet, and expand capacity. They are expected to enter revenue service sometime in early 2026, with full delivery of trains expected by 2029.
Bombardier MultiLevel Coach III		8200–8217	18 unpowered trailers (lavatory)	2024–2029	
Bombardier MultiLevel Coach III		8300–8411	112 power cars (no lavatory)	2024–2029	
Bombardier MultiLevel Coach III		8500–8643	144 unpowered trailers (no lavatory)	2024–2029	

== Unpowered passenger cars ==
NJ Transit has a fleet of over 1,000 passenger cars. Previous car fleets include the Comet I, Comet III, Comet IA, and Comet IB. The fleet and examples are described below.

Builder and model	Photo	Numbers	Total	Built	Notes
Bombardier Comet II		5300–5460	161 trailers (no lavatories)	1982–1989	Rebuilt 1999–2003 by AAI/Alstom; No wider "middle door" for improved accesibility
Bombardier Comet IV		5011–5031	21 cab cars (lavatory)	1996	No door at the engineer's position.; 5019 and 5025 are retired.; Cab cars have had their controls removed and are now used exclusively as trailers; Has an "middle door" on both sides for improved accessibility; All units are used on (but are not limited to) MidTown Direct service trains, trains leaving New York/Newark Penn Station, and the Atlantic City Line.
Bombardier Comet IV		5235–5264	30 trailers (lavatory)	1996	No door at the engineer's position.; 5019 and 5025 are retired.; Cab cars have had their controls removed and are now used exclusively as trailers; Has an "middle door" on both sides for improved accessibility; All units are used on (but are not limited to) MidTown Direct service trains, trains leaving New York/Newark Penn Station, and the Atlantic City Line.
Bombardier Comet IV		5535–5582	48 trailers (no lavatory)	1996	No door at the engineer's position.; 5019 and 5025 are retired.; Cab cars have had their controls removed and are now used exclusively as trailers; Has an "middle door" on both sides for improved accessibility; All units are used on (but are not limited to) MidTown Direct service trains, trains leaving New York/Newark Penn Station, and the Atlantic City Line.
Alstom Comet V		6000–6083	84 cab cars (lavatory)	2002–2004	Cab cars used on all trains equipped with comet train cars, including II and IVs; Comet V trailers are used only on the Hoboken division, Main/Bergen County, Pascack Valley, Morristown, and Montclair Boonton Lines, on trains entering/leaving Hoboken Terminal only, they're mainly used with diesel equipment. Trains leaving/entering Penn Station New York or Newark Penn Station use older Comet II and IVs as trailers, and Gladstone branch trains leaving Hoboken uses Arrow III EMUs.
Alstom Comet V		6200–6213	14 trailers (lavatory)	2002–2004	Cab cars used on all trains equipped with comet train cars, including II and IVs; Comet V trailers are used only on the Hoboken division, Main/Bergen County, Pascack Valley, Morristown, and Montclair Boonton Lines, on trains entering/leaving Hoboken Terminal only, they're mainly used with diesel equipment. Trains leaving/entering Penn Station New York or Newark Penn Station use older Comet II and IVs as trailers, and Gladstone branch trains leaving Hoboken uses Arrow III EMUs.
Alstom Comet V		6500–6601	102 trailers (no lavatory)	2002–2004	Cab cars used on all trains equipped with comet train cars, including II and IVs; Comet V trailers are used only on the Hoboken division, Main/Bergen County, Pascack Valley, Morristown, and Montclair Boonton Lines, on trains entering/leaving Hoboken Terminal only, they're mainly used with diesel equipment. Trains leaving/entering Penn Station New York or Newark Penn Station use older Comet II and IVs as trailers, and Gladstone branch trains leaving Hoboken uses Arrow III EMUs.
Bombardier MultiLevel Coach		7000–7051	52 cab cars (lavatory)	2005–2009	Joint order with AMT (Montreal).; 45-car option exercised in June 2007, 50-car option exercised in August 2008.
Bombardier MultiLevel Coach		7200–7298	99 trailers (lavatory)	2005–2009	Joint order with AMT (Montreal).; 45-car option exercised in June 2007, 50-car option exercised in August 2008.
Bombardier MultiLevel Coach		7500–7677	178 trailers (no lavatory)	2005–2009	Cab cars have no door at the engineer's position, and a door with no low-level trapdoor to board from low-level platforms on the left side of the cab; All 419 Multilevel I and Multilevel II units will be overhauled after $917 million was authorized for the project, part of a larger project from NJT to modernize its fleet by 2031, and insure compatibility with operations with the new Multilevel III units
Bombardier MultiLevel Coach II		7052–7061	10 cab cars (lavatory)	2011–2013	Cab cars have no door at the engineer's position, and a door with no low-level trapdoor to board from low-level platforms on the left side of the cab; All 419 Multilevel I and Multilevel II units will be overhauled after $917 million was authorized for the project, part of a larger project from NJT to modernize its fleet by 2031, and insure compatibility with operations with the new Multilevel III units
Bombardier MultiLevel Coach II		7678–7767	90 trailers (no lavatory)	2011–2013	Cab cars have no door at the engineer's position, and a door with no low-level trapdoor to board from low-level platforms on the left side of the cab; All 419 Multilevel I and Multilevel II units will be overhauled after $917 million was authorized for the project, part of a larger project from NJT to modernize its fleet by 2031, and insure compatibility with operations with the new Multilevel III units
