= Bombardier ALP-45DP =

Model of electro-diesel locomotives built by Bombardier Transportation

ALP-45DP
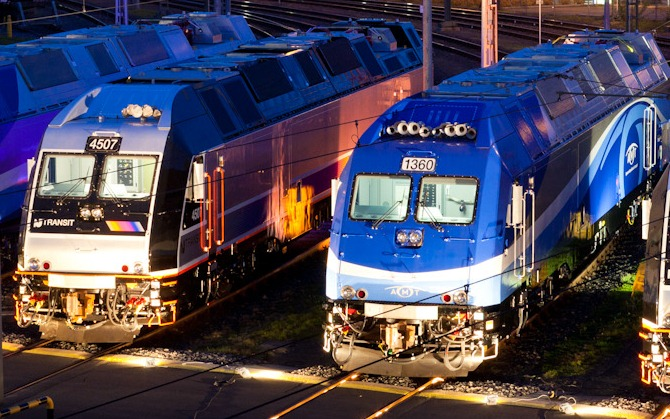
- ALP-45DP locomotives for NJT and AMT in Kassel, Germany
Type and origin
- Power type: Electro-diesel (dual mode)
- Builder: Bombardier Transportation; Alstom
- Build date: 2010–2012; 2019–Present
- Total produced: NJT: 72; Exo: 20
Specifications
- Configuration
  - AAR: B-B
  - UIC: Bo′Bo′
- Gauge: 4 ft 8 1/2 in (1,435 mm) standard gauge
- Bogies: FLEXX Power 250
- Wheel diameter: 1.118 to 1.046 m (44.0 to 41.2 in) new / worn
- Minimum curve: 91 m (298.56 ft)
- Wheelbase: bogie (truck) 2.8 m (9 ft 2 in) bogie centres 13.25 m (43 ft 6 in)
- Length: 21.8 m (72 ft) length over coupler faces
- Width: 2.95 m (9 ft 8 1/8 in)
- Height: 4.4 m (14 ft 5 1/4 in)
- Axle load: 32.65 t (72,000 lb) max
- Loco weight: 131 t (288,000 lb)
- Fuel type: Diesel
- Fuel capacity: NJT: 1,600 US gal (6,100 L; 1,300 imp gal), Exo: 1,800 US gal (6,800 L; 1,500 imp gal)
- Electric system/s: Overhead line: 25 kV 60 Hz AC; 12 kV 25 Hz AC (NJT only)
- Current pickup: pantograph
- Prime mover: 2 × Caterpillar 3512C HD
- RPM range: 600-1800
- Engine type: V12 diesel
- Aspiration: Turbocharged
- Displacement: 58.6 L (3,580 cu in)
- Alternator: 2 × MITRAC TG 3800A, 1700 kVA
- Traction motors: 4 × MITRAC DR 3700F, 1,300 kW (1,700 hp) each (Note: Each traction motor drive- unit consists of a MITRAC TM 3700F forced air cooled, three phase induction (asynchronous) motor, with a MITRAC GB 3700 helical spur gear and hollow shaft drive.)
- Head end power: 1100 kVA, 1,000 kW (1,300 hp), 3 phase, 3 x 480 V AC 60 Hz
- Transmission: AC-DC-AC
- MU working: Yes, up to 2 units (Note: Multiple working in dual mode with locomotives of the same class. NJT: Electric mode also with ALP-46, and ALP-44. Diesel mode with NJT PL42AC and GP40.)
- Train heating: Locomotive supplied HEP
- Loco brake: Regenerative/Dynamic, WABCO Electro-pneumatic. Mechanical: hollow shaft mounted disc brake, plus tread brakes
- Train brakes: Pneumatic
- Couplers: Tightlock coupler
Performance figures
- Maximum speed: Diesel mode: 161 km/h (100 mph); Electric mode: 201 km/h (125 mph)
- Power output: Continuous electric at rail: 5,360 hp (4,000 kW); Max electric at rail: 5,900 hp (4,400 kW); Max diesel at rail: 3,600 hp (2,700 kW) (no HEP); Max diesel at rail: 2,734 hp (2,039 kW) (With HEP for 8 car train); 1,567 kW (2,101 hp) each, 3,108 kW (4,168 hp) at shaft. inserted
- Tractive effort: 316 kN (71,000 lb_{f}) starting 262 kN (59,000 lb_{f}) continuous electric @55 km/h (34 mph); 291 kN (65,000 lb_{f}) continuous diesel @25.2 km/h (16 mph)
- Factor of adh.: 4.056
- Brakeforce: Electric regenerative: 4,000 kW (5,400 hp); Electric dynamic: 1,300 kW (1,700 hp); Maximum electric brake effort: 150 kN (34,000 lb_{f})
Career
- Operators: NJ Transit; Exo
- Numbers: NJT (45DP): 4500–4534; NJT (45A): 4535–4559; Exo: 1350–1369
- First run: NJT: May 30, 2012
- Sources: except where noted

The Bombardier ALP-45DP is a type of single cab dual-mode locomotive operated by New Jersey Transit and Exo. The locomotive was designed and originally built by Bombardier until 2021, and by Alstom since 2021.

== Operators ==
=== New Jersey Transit ===
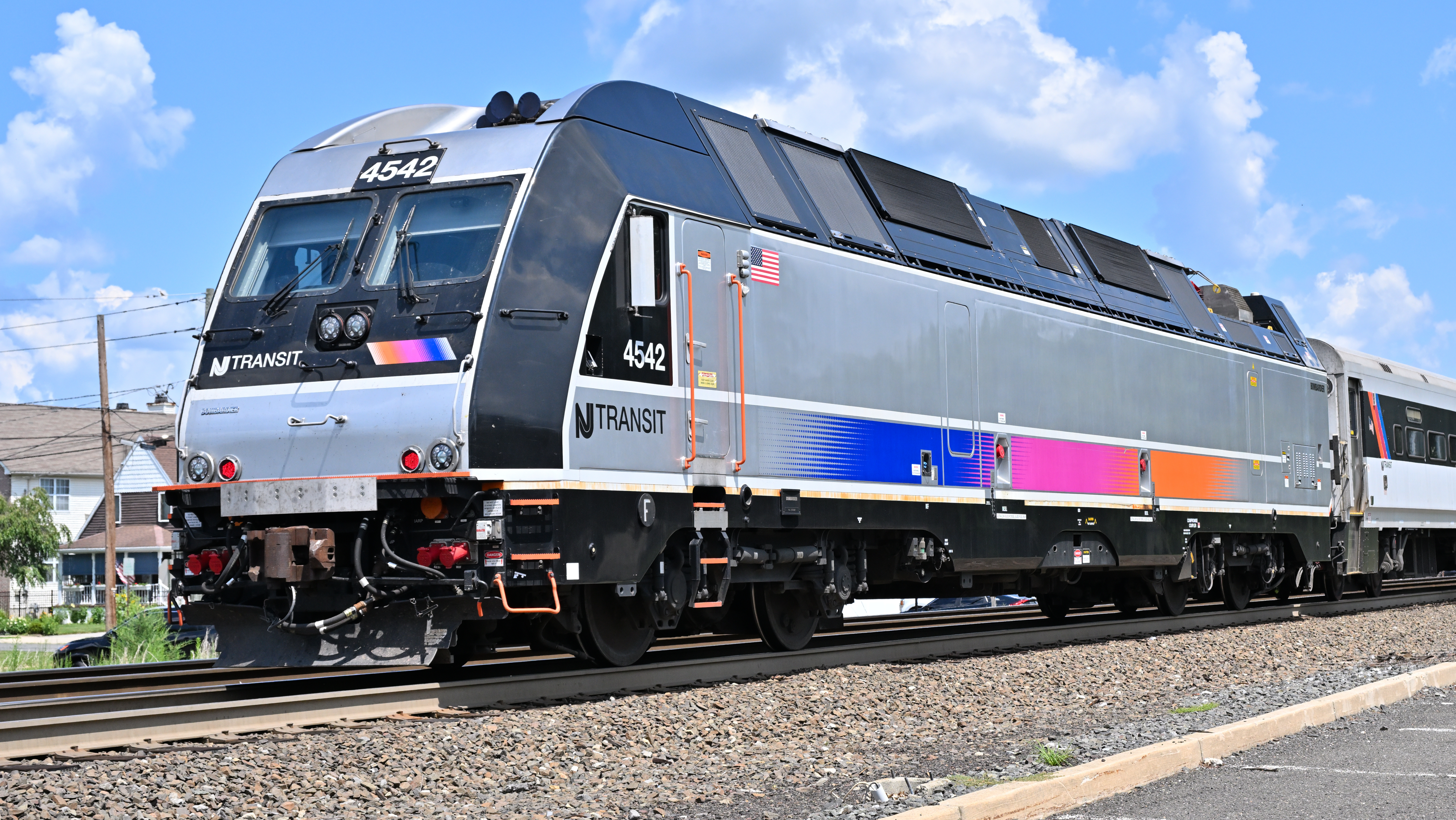
NJ Transit ALP-45A No. 4542 departing Raritan station

New Jersey Transit (NJT) purchased 26 ALP-45DPs in 2008, with an option to purchase up to 63 additional units. The first locomotive from the order was displayed at Innotrans in 2010 and was officially unveiled at Pennsylvania Station on May 11, 2011. NJT purchased 9 additional units in July 2010. The locomotives from these two orders are numbered 4500–4534.

The ALP-45DPs are used on the Morristown Line, Montclair-Boonton Line, Raritan Valley Line, Northeast Corridor Line, and the North Jersey Coast Line, providing a one-seat ride into New York Penn Station. They are also used on the Main Line, Bergen County Line, Pascack Valley Line, and occasionally on Metro-North Railroad's Port Jervis Line while some are used on the Gladstone Branch on either Hoboken or Midtown direct trains. They have replaced all GP40FH-2 locomotives (except those owned by Metro-North), and a majority of the GP40PH-2 and F40PH-2CAT locomotives.

In December 2017, NJT purchased 17 additional ALP-45DPs, labelled as the ALP-45A. On June 28, 2019, Bombardier announced that the first car body from this order was inspected and approved for final assembly. In July 2020, NJT ordered 8 additional ALP-45As. Originally slated to replace the remaining GP40PH-2B locomotives, the 25 locomotives are now intended to replace the majority of the PL42AC fleet, due to the PL42AC's unreliability and inability to be upgraded to meet new Environmental Protection Agency standards. The ALP-45A locomotives from the 2017 and 2020 orders were numbered 4535–4559. On December 15, 2020, the first unit from the order, No. 4535, has left the Kassel factory and was delivered in January 2021. No. 4536 was the first ALP-45A unit to enter revenue service on July 30, 2021. Following the purchase of Bombardier Transportation in January 2021, Alstom became responsible for completing the ALP-45A order. On May 14th, 2025, NJT ordered 12 new ALP-45As, along with 200 new Multilevel III railcars from Alstom.

In September 2026, NJ Transit announced a $27 million program to rebuild 50 engines for 24 ALP-45A locomotives built in 2021.

=== Exo ===
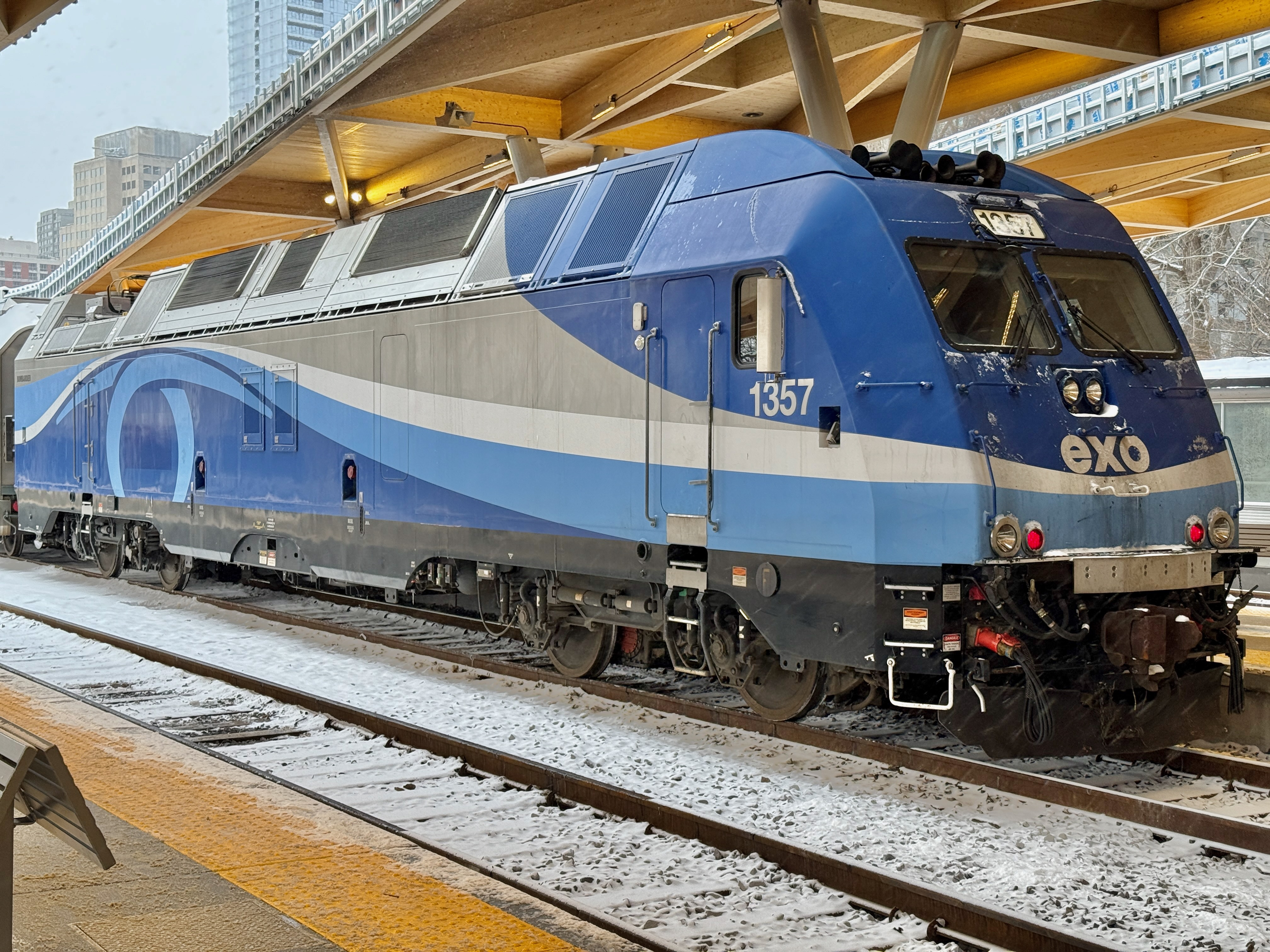
Exo ALP-45DP No. 1357 at Lucien-L'Allier station

In 2008, the predecessor of Montreal's Exo, the Agence métropolitaine de transport (AMT), ordered 20 locomotives (with an option for 10 more), with an order value of €152 million. These units replaced the remaining GP9s, F40PHRs, and all ex-NJT equipment. The locomotives are for use on the Vaudreuil-Hudson line, Saint-Jérôme line, Mont-Saint-Hilaire line, and Mascouche line to Montreal Central Station via the 25 kV AC electrified Mount Royal Tunnel. They are numbered 1350-1369.

The first unit, AMT 1350, arrived in Montreal on June 9, 2011, after being shipped to Newark and then moving north to its new home.

The locomotives originally ran in electric mode along the entirety of the Deux-Montagnes line and along the Mascouche line between Montreal Central Station and Ahuntsic station. However, in January 2020, the electrified portion of the Exo network was permanently closed, so the locomotives now operate exclusively in diesel mode. The Deux-Montagnes line was converted into the mainline of the Réseau express métropolitain light metro system and the Mascouche line was truncated to Côte-de-Liesse station.

== Design ==
The ALP-45DP is an electro-diesel locomotive design, based on Bombardier's ALP-46/A and TRAXX locomotives. (Note: "ALP" refers to "American Locomotive Passenger"; "4" indicates the number of axles; "5" refers to the power class, ~5MW; "DP" indicates dual power.) Design requirements included weight less than 288,000 lb (131,000 kg), length less than 75 ft (22.86 m), and EPA-compliant emissions.

The challenge of fitting diesel and electric systems within the same carbody while staying within axle load limits, led to the choice of two high-speed, twelve-cylinder Caterpillar 3512C HD diesel engines rated at 2,100 hp (1.6 MW) each. The systems for the two engines are independent – for example, each has a separate 3,400 L (750 imp gal; 900 US gal) fuel supply (split across four total tanks owing to NJT regulations regarding tunnel operations that limit individual fuel tank capacity to 400 US gal (1,500 L; 330 imp gal)) – allowing the locomotive to operate on one engine in case of failure or under low load. The engines are capable of shorter startup times from idle to load (100 rpm/s) than traditional medium speed diesel engines. To achieve mass balance and distribution within the locomotive, the engines are situated on either side of the transformer, which is located in the center of the locomotive. The engines are manufactured in Lafayette, Indiana, USA.

When running under diesel power, each engine powers a MITRAC TG 3800 A alternator having an output of 1700 kVA @ 1800 rpm. Power output is reduced from 6,700 hp (5.0 MW) (including HEP) in electric mode to 4,200 hp (3.1 MW) in diesel mode; under diesel power, the same tractive effort curve is maintained up to around 25 km/h (16 mph) (assuming 2,734 hp (2.039 MW) available for traction after HEP reductions for an 8 car train).

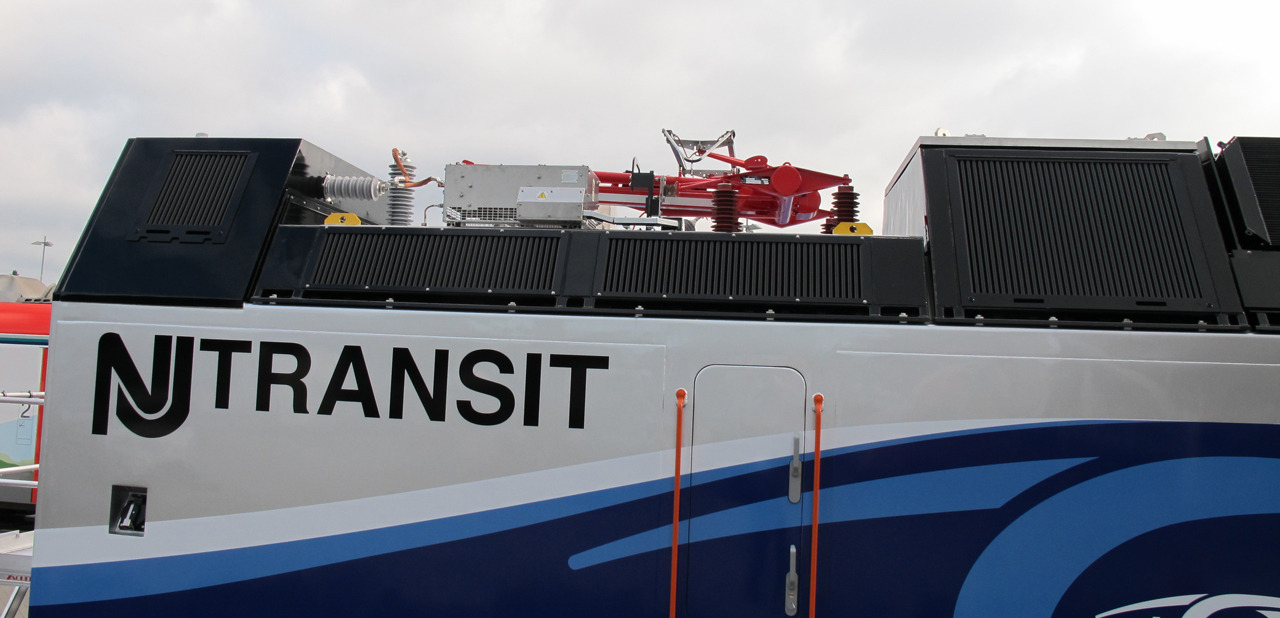
Pantograph mounted at the rear of the locomotive

The pantograph is of TransTech design. The ABB main transformer has four secondary taps, switchable to supply 1360 V under all electrification supplies. There are two MITRAC TC 3360 DP V01 DC-AC main converters, one per bogie, which convert the single phase input to a 2,8 kV intermediate DC-bus, using IGBT based switches. Each DC bus powers two traction converters, with each traction inverter powering a separate traction motor. The locomotive uses four 1,300 kW (1,700 hp) MITRAC DR 3700 F fully suspended, bogie mounted traction drives to reduce unsprung mass.

In addition to taps for the traction inverters, the locomotive transformer supplies 1 100 kVA and 140 kVA for head-end power and locomotive auxiliary power. Two partially-redundant auxiliary inverters are incorporated into the two main converter units. Normally, one provides a 3 phase, 480 V 60 Hz 1100 kVA supply for head end power, while the other provides several 3 phase variable voltage, variable frequency supplies (up to 480 V 60 Hz) for the traction motor fans, transformer fans, and inverter cooling circuit motors. In the event of a converter failure, it is possible to route all supply through a single converter, ensuring redundancy and margin of error operations.

HEP is maintained when changing power modes, due to the fact that the pantograph is not lowered until the prime movers have been started (when changing from electric to diesel), and the prime movers are not shut down until the pantograph has made contact with the catenary wire (when changing from diesel to electric). In either case, the changeover takes approximately 100 seconds. The locomotive is capable of performing a mode change while on the move; however, NJ Transit has reprogrammed their locomotives to only allow a mode change during a station stop. This is most likely to prevent the loss of power during the transition to diesel mode with a limited amount of wire left.

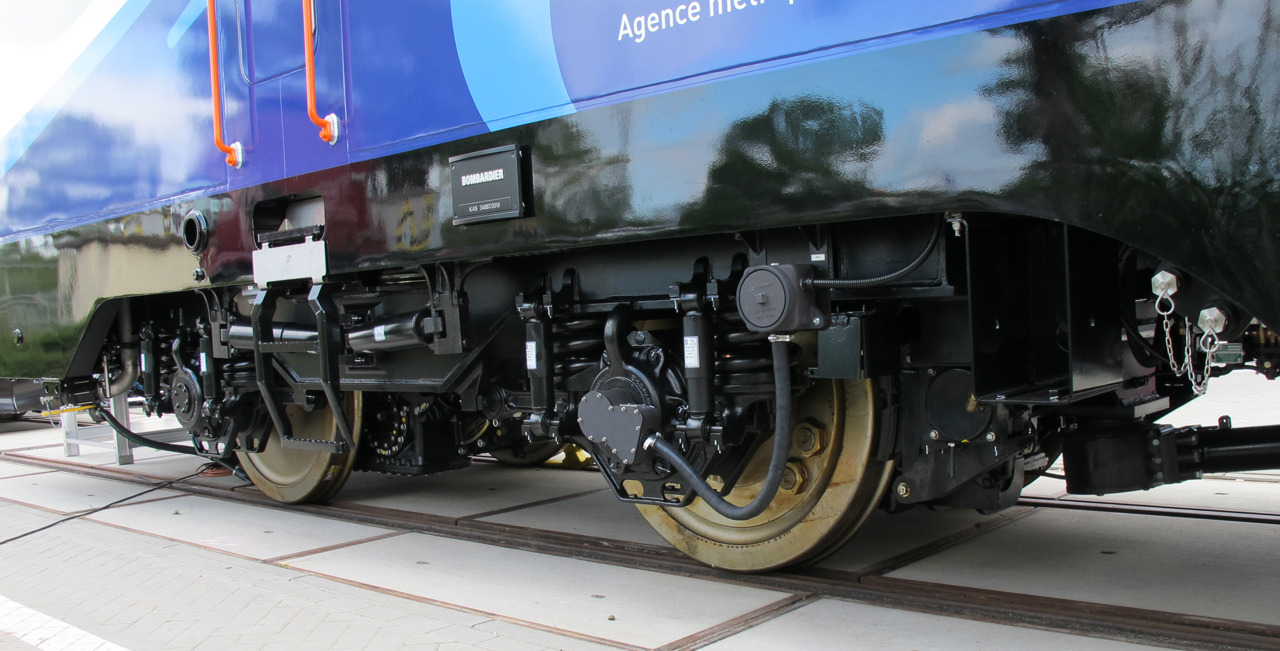
Bogie and suspension detail

The braking system uses Wabtec's Fastbrake control system, with two disc brakes per axle. The mechanical parts of the brake system were supplied by Faiveley Transport. Compressed air supply is charged through a Knorr screw compressor with a capacity of 3,400 L/min (750 imp gal/min; 900 US gal/min) at 10 bar (1,000 kPa; 150 psi) pressure, stored in two 480 L (110 imp gal; 130 US gal) air reservoirs. The dynamic and regenerative braking system operates under all three NJT electrical systems. In addition, the locomotive, while in diesel mode, is capable of routing power generated by the electric brake to HEP and locomotive auxiliary power requirements in addition to the dynamic brake resistor.

The locomotives are within Amtrak's A-05-1355 structure gauge and meet CFR and AAR crashworthiness standards. The diesel engines meet Tier 3 EPA emission standards, and work is being done to enable an upgrade to Tier 4 standards, which took effect on January 1, 2015. Total length is 21.8 m (72 ft), approximately 2 m (6 ft 7 in) longer than the ALP-46A.

The bodyshells of the locomotive were constructed at Bombardier's Wrocław site, the bogies at Siegen, and the alternators at Hennigsdorf factory. The locomotives were assembled at Kassel.

ALP-45DP exterior at Innotrans 2010

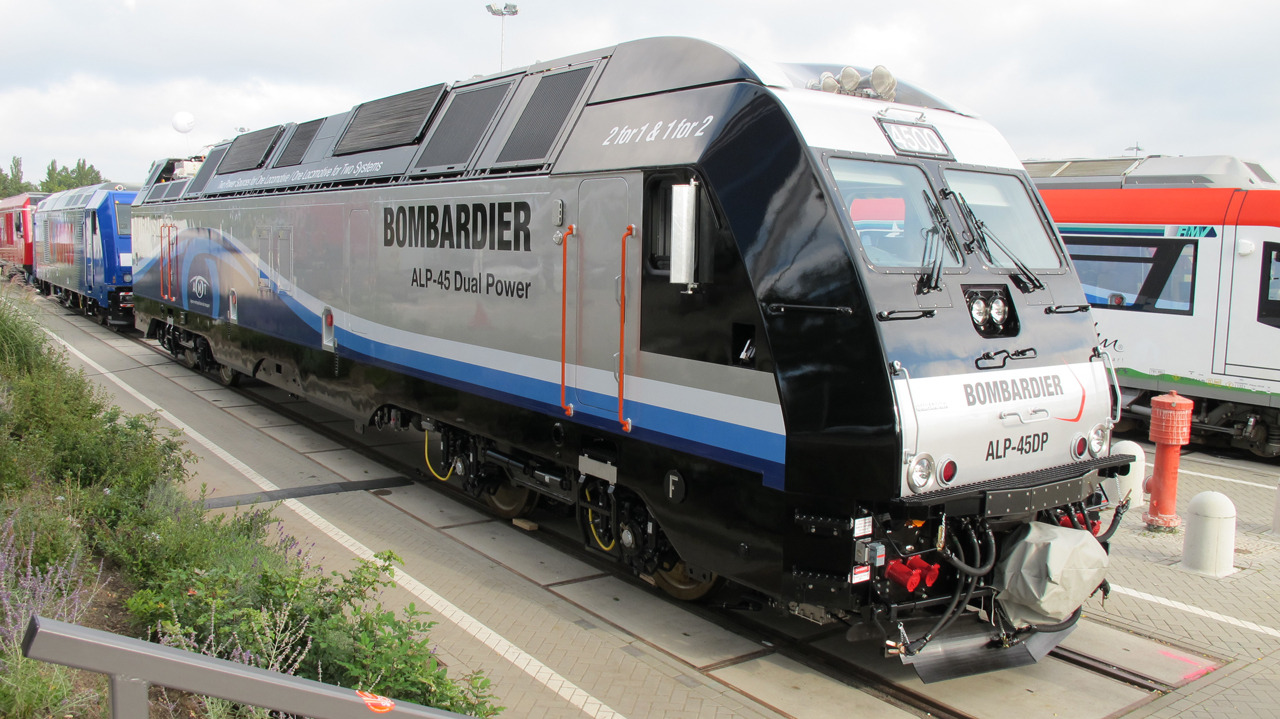
Front view

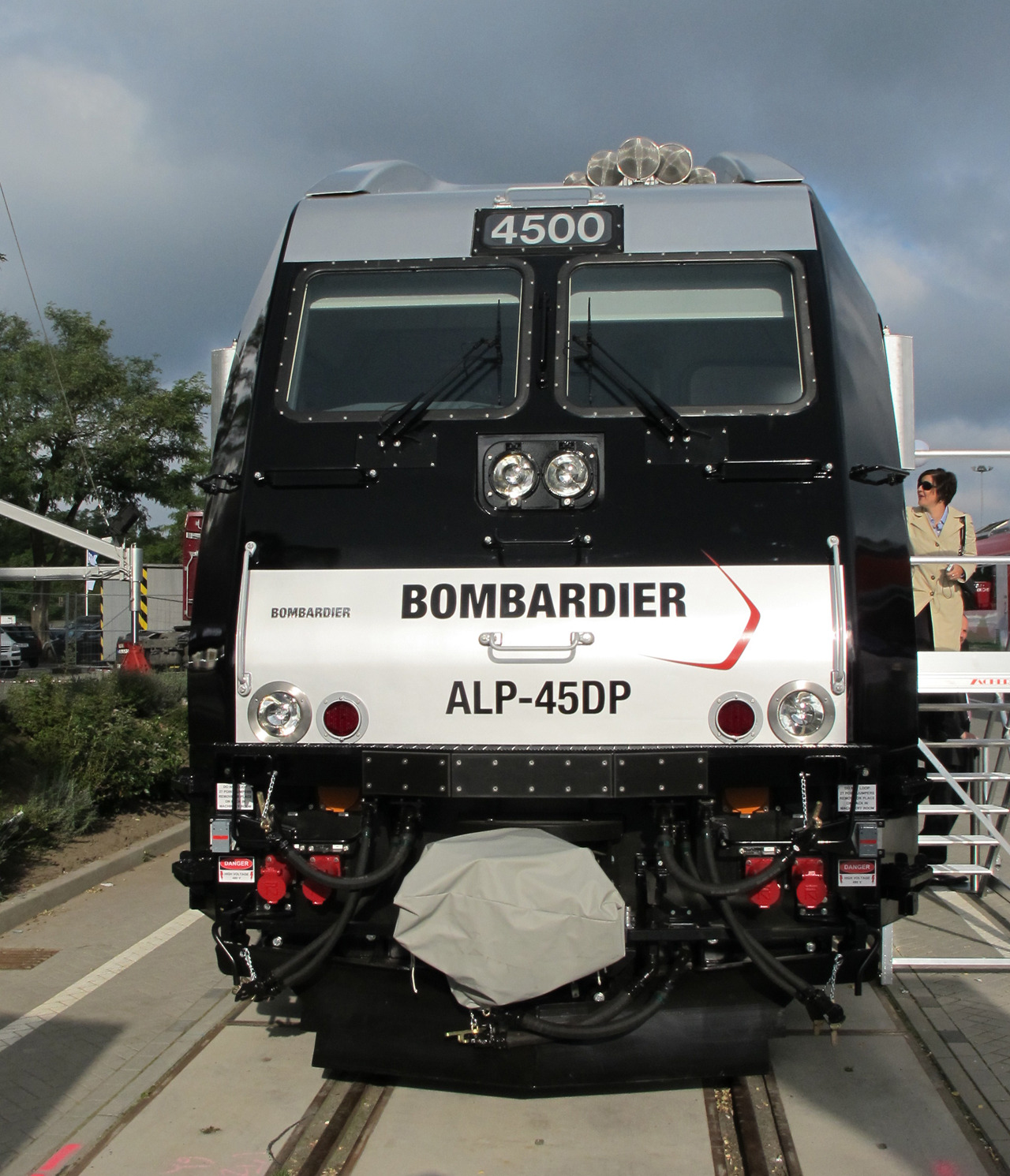
Frontal shot

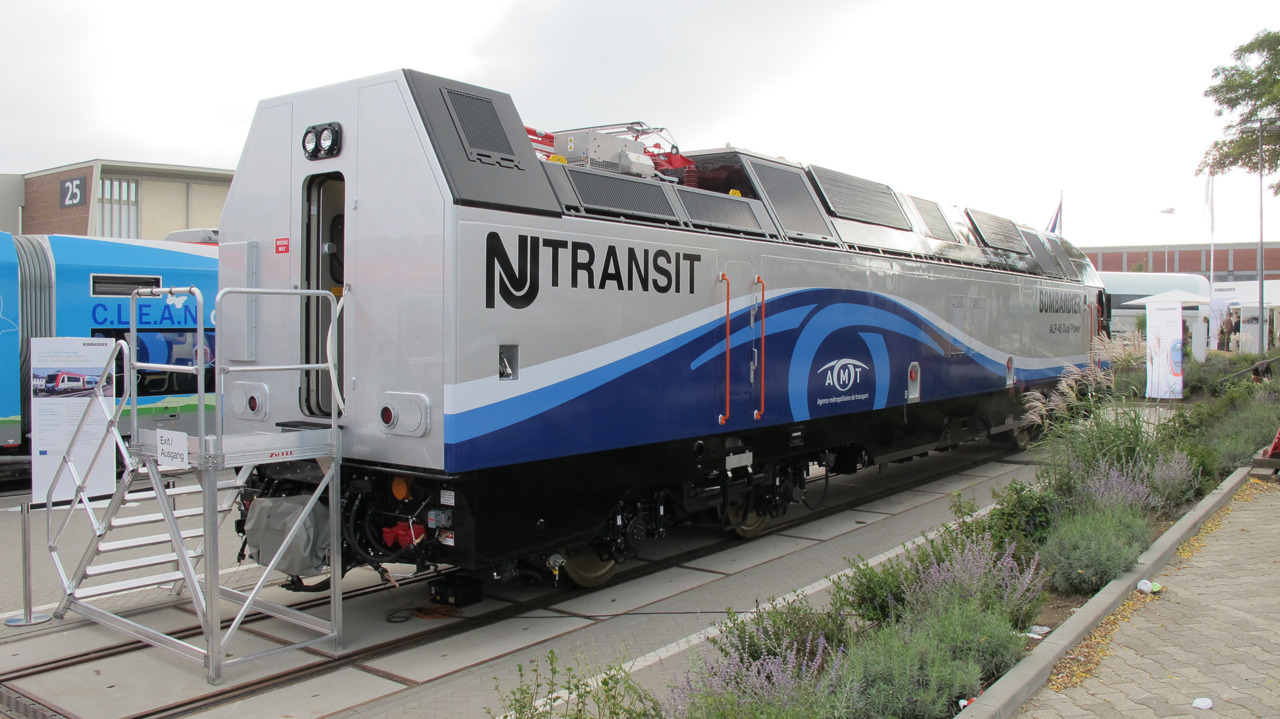
Rear corner view
ALP-45DP interiors

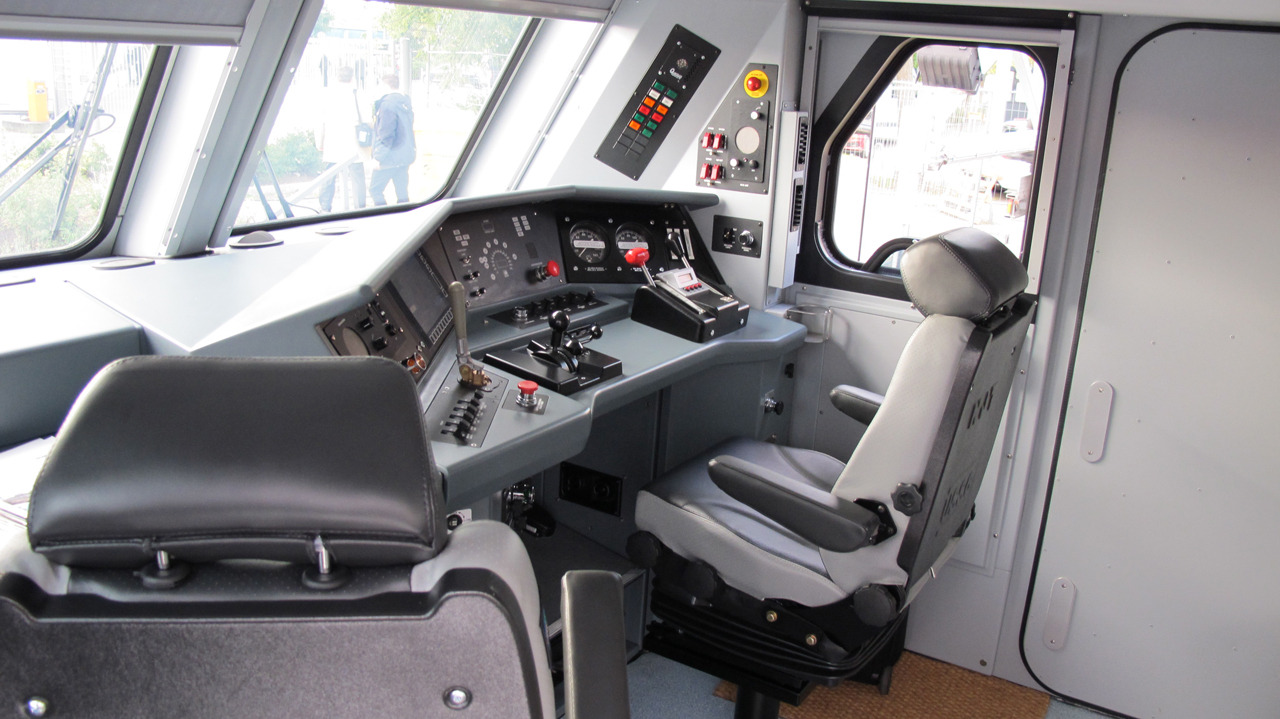
Cab interior

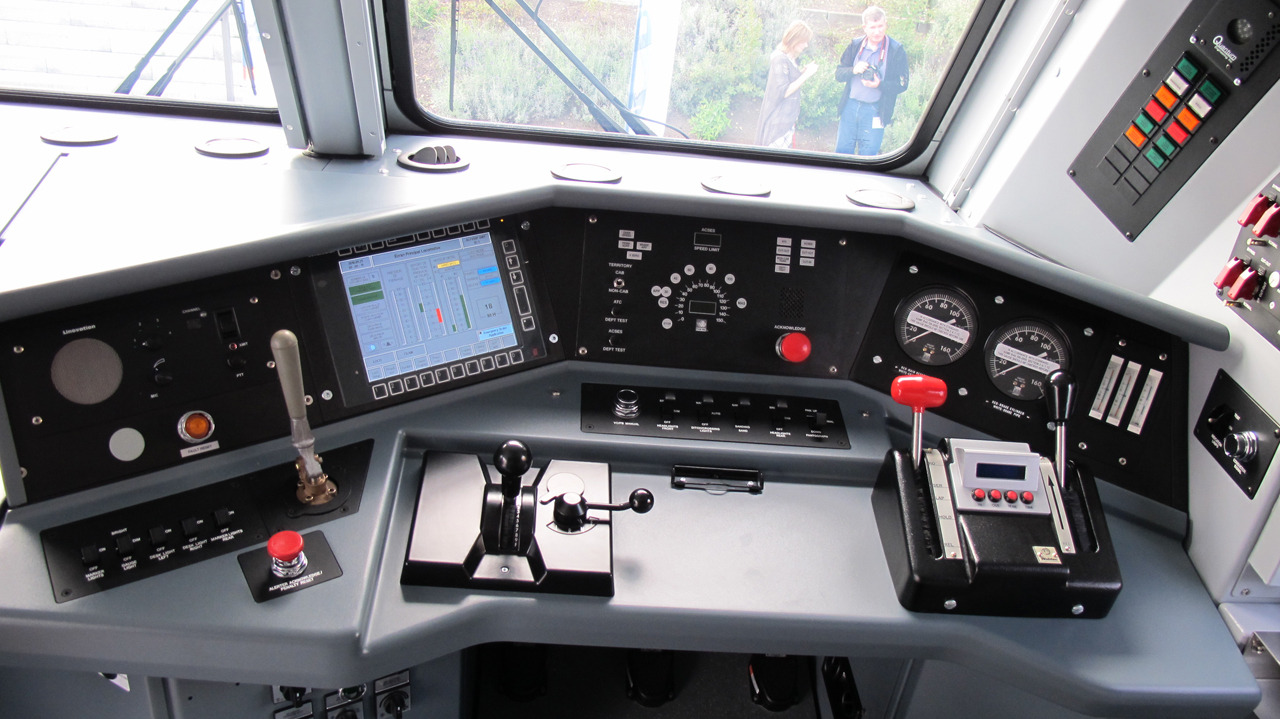
Engineer's controls

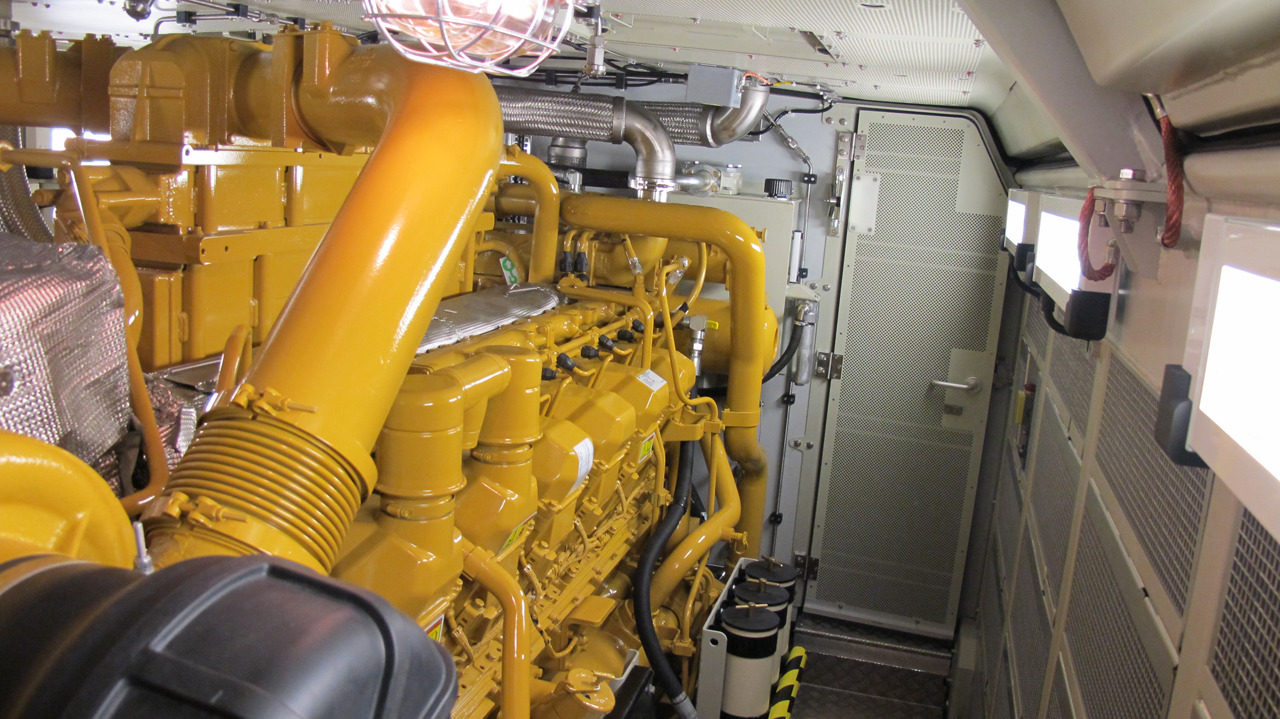
Caterpillar prime mover inside the engine room
