= EMD AEM-7 =

American electric locomotive

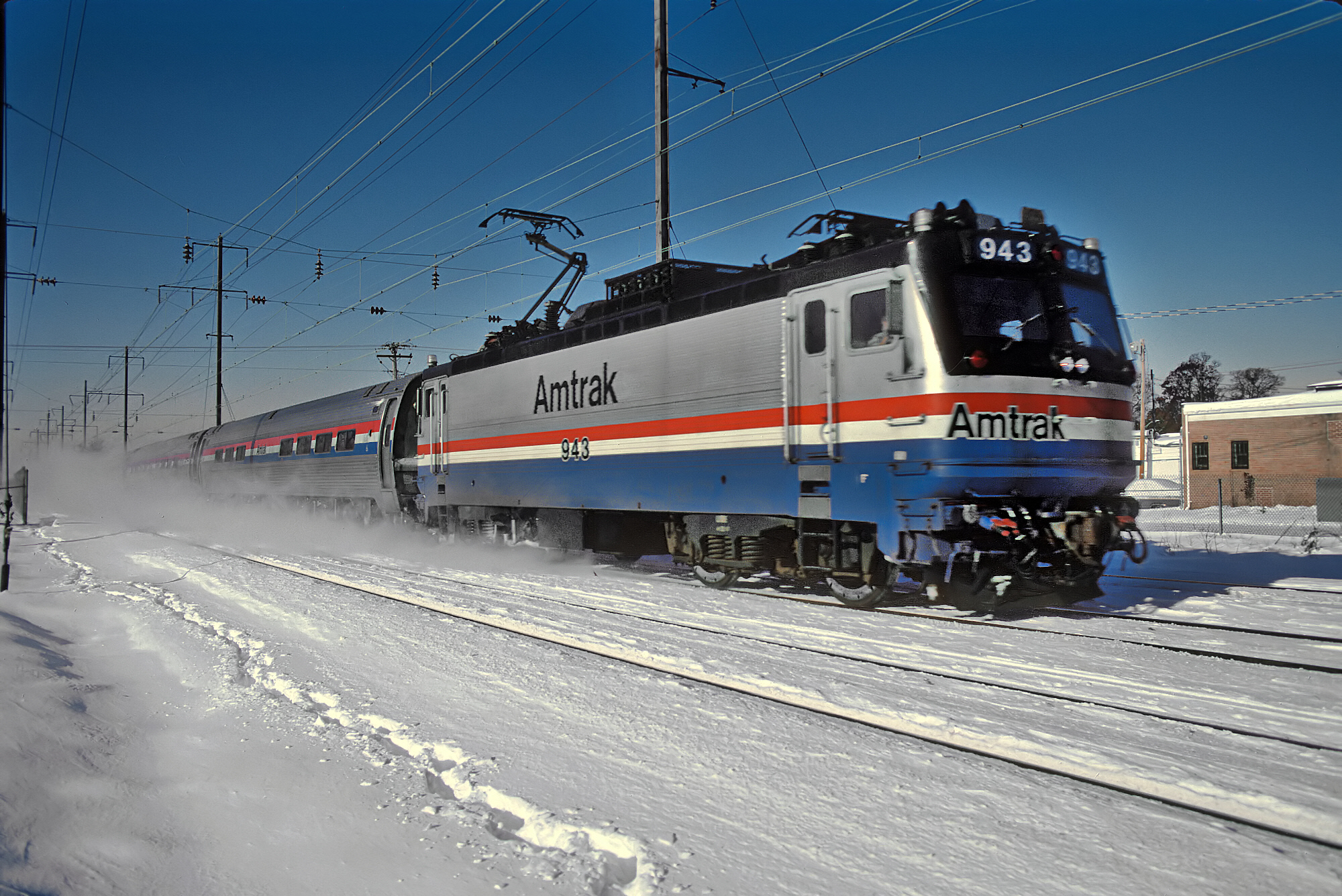
- Amtrak AEM-7 No. 943 operating as a Metroliner at Seabrook, Maryland, in 1987
Type and origin
- Power type: Electric
- Builder: EMD–ASEA
- Model: SJ Rc
- Build date: 1978–1988
- Total produced: 65
- Rebuilder: Alstom
- Rebuild date: 1999–2002
- Number rebuilt: 29
Specifications
- Configuration
  - AAR: B-B
  - UIC: Bo'Bo'
- Gauge: 4 ft 8 1/2 in (1,435 mm) standard gauge
- Wheel diameter: 51 1/8 in (1,300 mm)
- Wheelbase: 25 ft 7 1/16 in (7.80 m) (between truck centers)
- Length: 51 ft 1 25/32 in (15.59 m)
- Width: 10 ft 2 in (3.10 m)
- Height: 14 ft 9.5 in (4.51 m)
- Service weight: 101 short tons (90.2 long tons; 91.6 tonnes)
- Power supply: 500 kW, 480 V AC
- Electric system/s: Overhead line: 25 kV 60 Hz AC; 12.5 kV 60 Hz AC; 12 kV 25 Hz AC
- Current pickup: Dual pantographs
- Traction motors: ASEA LJH 108-5 (DC); Alstom 6 FXA 5856 (AC)
- Head end power: 500 kW (DC); 1,000 kW (AC)
- Gear ratio: 85:36
- MU working: Yes, AAR
- Train heating: Locomotive-supplied head-end power
Performance figures
- Maximum speed: 125 mph (200 km/h)
- Power output: 7,000 hp (5,220 kW)
- Tractive effort
  - Starting: 51,710 lbf (230 kN)
  - Continuous: 28,100 lbf (125 kN)
- Factor of adh.: 3.91
Career
- Operators: Amtrak; MARC; SEPTA
- Numbers: Amtrak: 900–953; MARC: 4900–4903; SEPTA: 2301–2307
- Nicknames: Toasters; Meatballs
- Locale: Northeast United States
- First run: May 9, 1980 (Amtrak)
- Last run: December 1, 2018 (SEPTA)
- Retired: 2016 (Amtrak); 2017 (MARC); 2018 (SEPTA)
- Preserved: Amtrak Nos. 915, 917, 927, and 945
- Disposition: Two Amtrak units sold to TTCI, two Amtrak units sold to Caltrain, four Amtrak units preserved, all MARC units stored, remainder Amtrak and all SEPTA scrapped

The EMD AEM-7 is a twin-cab four-axle B-B 7,000 hp (5.2 MW) electric locomotive manufactured by Electro-Motive Division (EMD) and ASEA between 1978 and 1988. It is a derivative of the Swedish SJ Rc4 designed for passenger service in the United States. Amtrak purchased 54 for use on the Northeast Corridor and Keystone Corridor while commuter operators MARC and SEPTA purchased four and seven for a combined total of 65.

Amtrak ordered the AEM-7 after the failure of the GE E60 locomotive. The first locomotives entered service in 1980 and were an immediate success, ending a decade of uncertainty on the Northeast Corridor. In the late 1990s, Amtrak rebuilt 29 of its locomotives from DC to AC traction. The locomotives continued operating through the arrival of the final Siemens ACS-64 in June 2016. MARC retired its fleet in April 2017 in favor of Siemens Chargers, and SEPTA retired all seven of its AEM-7s in November 2018 in favor of ACS-64s.

== Background ==
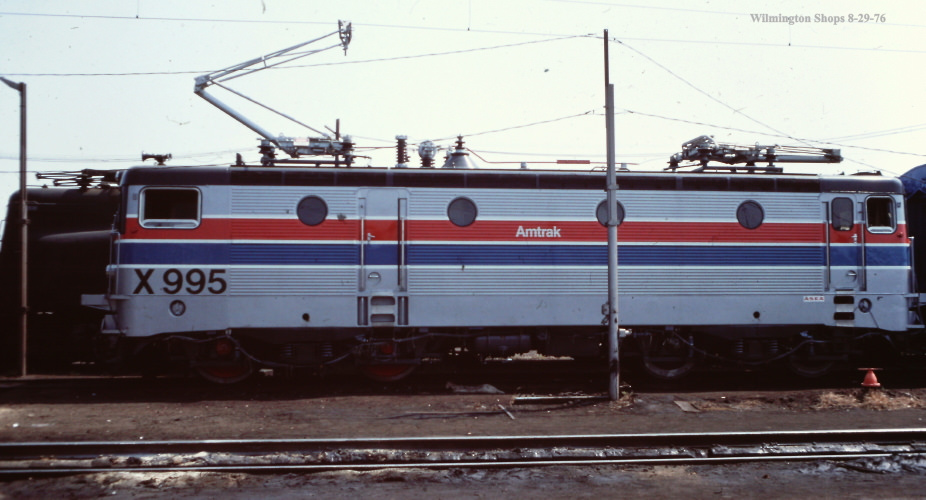
Swedish Rc4 imported and repainted in Amtrak livery for evaluation. This locomotive performed well and would become the basis of the AEM-7.

Amtrak assumed control of almost all private sector intercity passenger rail service in the United States on May 1, 1971, with a mandate to reverse decades of decline. Amtrak retained approximately 184 of the 440 trains which had run the day before. To operate these trains, Amtrak inherited a fleet of 300 locomotives (electric and diesel) and 1190 passenger cars, most of which dated from the 1940s–1950s.

Operation on the electrified portion of the Northeast Corridor was split between the Budd Metroliner electric multiple units and PRR GG1 locomotives. The latter were over 35 years old and restricted to 85 mph (137 km/h). Amtrak sought a replacement, but no US manufacturer offered an electric passenger locomotive. Importing and adapting a European locomotive would require a three-year lead time. With few other options, Amtrak turned to GE to adapt the E60C freight locomotive for passenger service. GE delivered two models, the E60CP and the E60CH. However, the locomotives proved unsuitable for speeds above 90 mph (145 km/h), leaving Amtrak once again in need of a permanent solution.

Amtrak then examined existing European high-speed designs, and two were imported for trials in 1976–77: the Swedish SJ Rc4 (Amtrak No. X995, SJ No. 1166), and the French SNCF Class CC 21000 (Amtrak No. X996, SNCF No. 21003). Amtrak favored the Swedish design, which became the basis for the AEM-7.

== Design ==
Comparison of AEM-7 with predecessors
	AEM-7	PRR GG1	GE E60
Length	51 ft 1 25/32 in (15.59 m)	79 ft 6 in (24.23 m)	71 ft 3 in (21.7 m)
Weight	101 short tons (90 long tons; 92 tonnes)	193.5 short tons (173 long tons; 176 tonnes)	237.5 short tons (212 long tons; 215 tonnes)

The AEM-7 was far smaller than its predecessors, the PRR GG1 and the GE E60. It measured 51 ft 1 25/32 in (15.59 m) long by 10 ft 2 in (3.10 m) wide, and stood 14 ft 9.5 in (4.51 m) tall, a decrease in length of over 20 ft (6.1 m). The AEM-7's weight was half that of the E60CP or the GG1. On its introduction it was the "smallest and lightest high horsepower locomotive in North America." The Budd Company manufactured the carbodies for the initial Amtrak order, while the Austrian firm Simmering-Graz-Pauker built the carbodies for the MARC and SEPTA orders.

Reflecting the varied electrification schemes on the Northeast Corridor the locomotives could operate at three different voltages: 11 kV 25 Hz AC, 12.5 kV 60 Hz AC and 25 kV 60 Hz. A pair of Faiveley DS-11 two-stage pantographs, one at each end of the locomotive, collected power from the overhead catenary wire. Thyristor converters stepped down the high-voltage AC to provide DC power at a much lower voltage to four traction motors, one per axle. As built the AEM-7 was rated at 7,000 hp (5.2 MW), with a starting tractive effort of 51,710 lbf (230 kN) and a continuous tractive effort of 28,100 lbf (125 kN). Its maximum speed was 125 miles per hour (201.2 km/h). A separate static converter supplied 500 kW 480 V head-end power (HEP) for passenger comfort. This was sufficient to supply heating, lighting, and other electrical needs in 8-10 Amfleet cars.

=== AEM-7AC ===
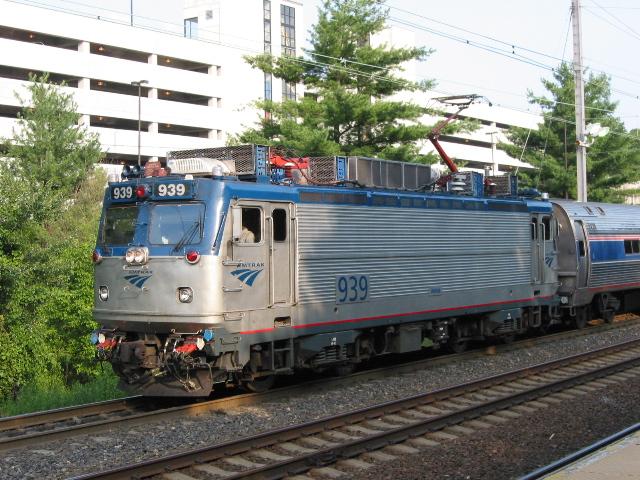
No. 939 was among the 29 units rebuilt as AEM-7ACs.

The rebuilt AEM-7ACs used AC traction instead of DC traction. The power modules used water-cooled insulated-gate bipolar transistor (IGBT) technology and provided about 5,000 kilowatts (6,700 horsepower) of traction power plus 1,000 kilowatts (1,300 horsepower) of HEP, twice the HEP capacity of the original DC units. The 6 FXA 5856 traction motors, from Alstom's ONIX family of propulsion components, had a maximum rating of 1,250–1,275 kilowatts (1,676–1,710 horsepower) each and a continuous rating of 1,080 kilowatts (1,450 horsepower). The remanufactured AEM-7ACs were the world's first passenger locomotives to incorporate IGBT technology.

== History ==
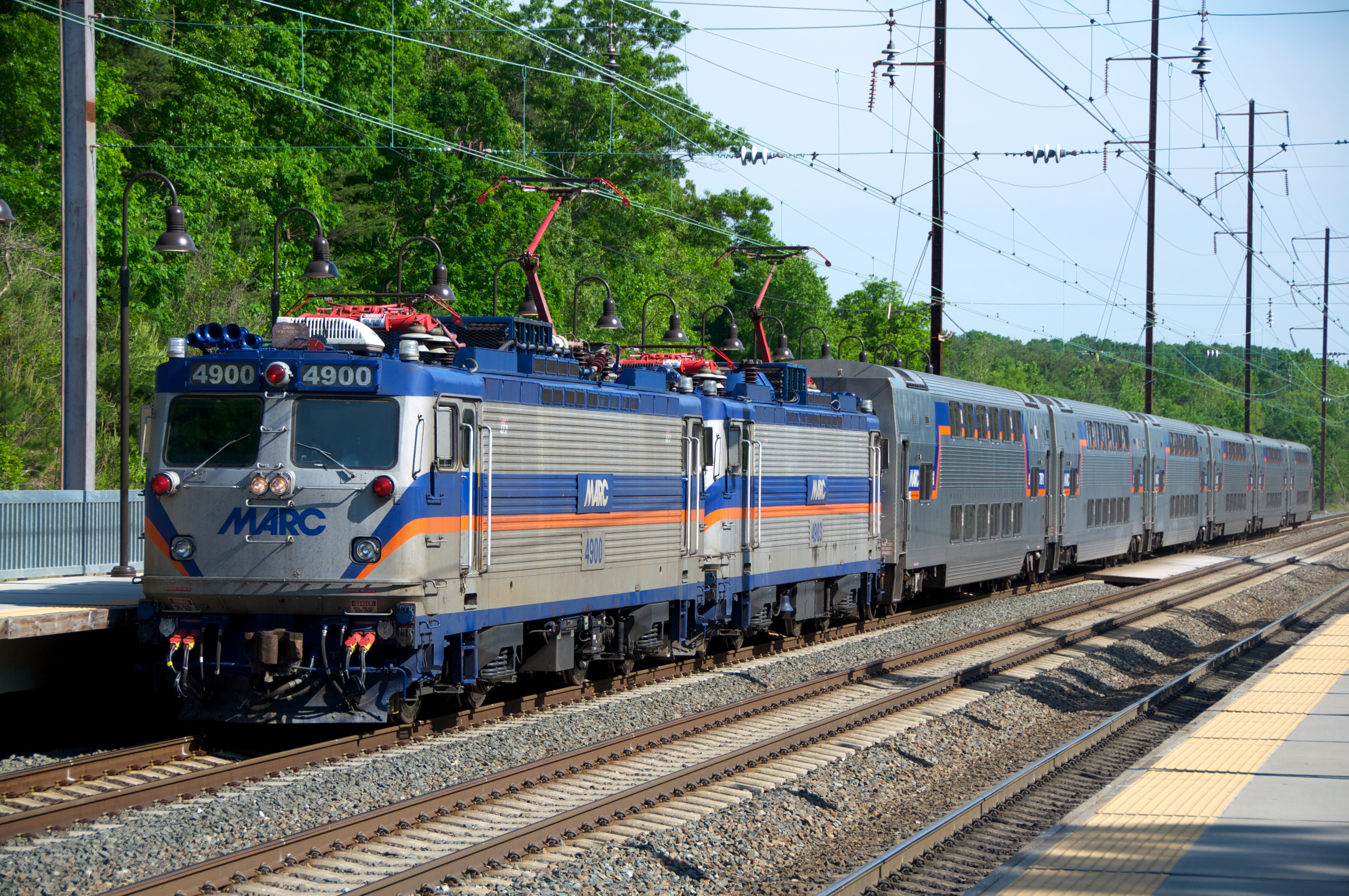
Two MARC AEM-7s at BWI Airport in 2012.

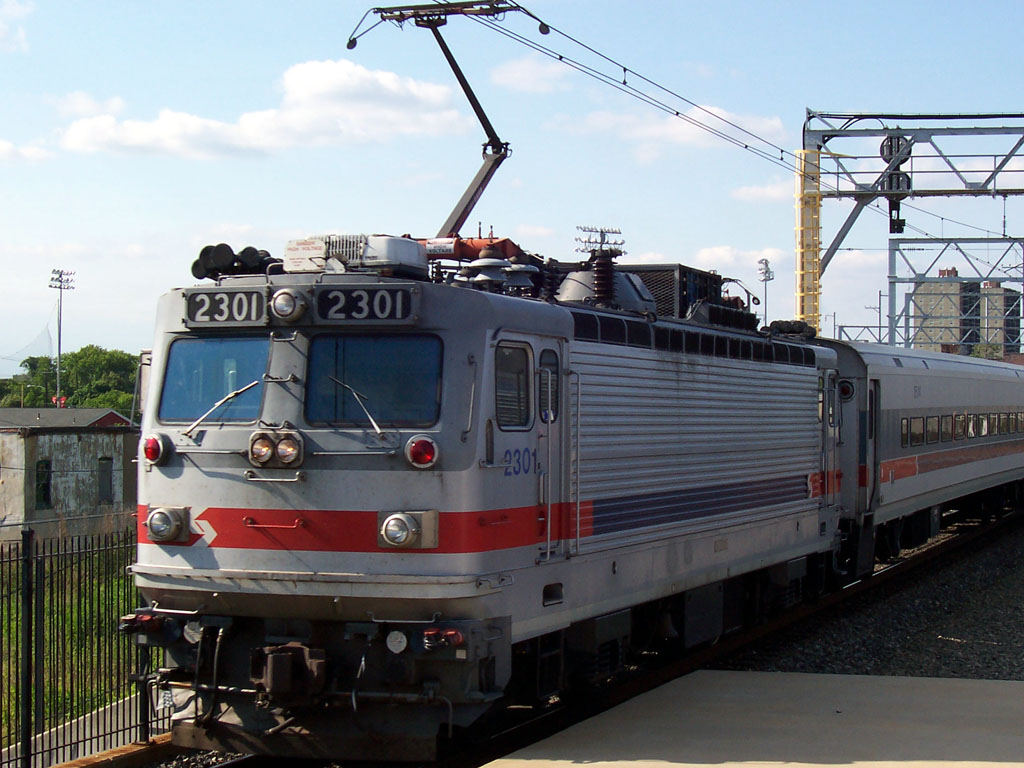
SEPTA AEM-7 No. 2301 entering Temple University

Amtrak planned a fleet of 53 locomotives, with an estimated cost of $137.5 million. Limited funding hampered that plan, but in September 1977 Amtrak proceeded with a plan to buy 30 locomotives for $77.8 million. Five groups bid on the contract: EMD/ASEA, Morrison Knudsen/Alstom, Brown Boveri, Siemens/KraussMaffei and AEG/KraussMaffei. Amtrak awarded the contract to the EMD/ASEA partnership in January 1978. It ordered 17 more locomotives in February 1980, bringing the total to 47.

The Railroad Test Track at the Transportation Test Center in Pueblo, Colorado was electrified in 1979 under sponsorship by the Northeast Corridor. The first locomotive completed, No. 900, was delivered to Amtrak in February 1980, then after acceptance testing, it was shipped to TTC for performance tests from April 1980 to May 1981. Testing included evaluation of three different pantograph designs, instantaneous power and total energy consumed during operation, and reliability testing, during which the AEM-7 was operated for 156,200 mi (251,400 km).

Revenue service began on May 9, 1980, when No. 901 departed Washington Union Station with a Metroliner service. The Swedish influence led to the nickname "Meatball", after Swedish meatballs. Railfans nicknamed the boxy locomotives "toasters". Between 1980 and 1982, 47 AEM-7s (Nos. 900–946) went into service. Amtrak retired the last of its PRR GG1s on May 1, 1981, while most of the GE E60s were sold to other operators. The new locomotives swiftly proved themselves; Car and Locomotive Cyclopedia stated that no new locomotive since the New York Central Hudson had "such an impact on speeds and schedule performance."

This strong performance led to further orders. Amtrak added seven more locomotives in 1987, delivered in 1988, for a total of 54. Two commuter operators in the Northeast ordered AEM-7s. MARC ordered four in 1986 for use on its Penn Line service on the Northeast Corridor between Washington, D.C., and Perryville, Maryland. The Southeastern Pennsylvania Transportation Authority (SEPTA) ordered seven in 1987. Amtrak also used the AEM-7s to handle the Keystone Service on the Keystone Corridor between Harrisburg and Philadelphia as the Budd Metroliners, displaced from the Northeast Corridor, reached the end of their service lives.

=== Refurbishment ===
In 1999, Amtrak and Alstom began a remanufacturing program for Amtrak's AEM-7s. Alstom supplied AC propulsion equipment, electrical cabinets, transformers, HEP, and cab displays. The rebuild provided Amtrak with locomotives that had improved high end tractive effort and performance with longer trains. Amtrak workers performed the overhauls under Alstom supervision at Amtrak's shop in Wilmington, Delaware. These remanufactured AEM-7s were designated AEM-7AC. Between 1999 and 2002, Amtrak rebuilt 29 of its AEM-7s.

=== Retirement ===
As the locomotives passed 30 years of service their operators made plans for replacements. In 2010, Amtrak ordered 70 Siemens ACS-64 locomotives to replace both the AEM-7s and the newer but unreliable Bombardier/Alstom HHP-8s. The ACS-64s began entering revenue service in February 2014. The last two active AEM-7s, Amtrak Nos. 942 and 946, made their final run on June 18, 2016, on a special farewell excursion that ran between Washington, D.C., and Philadelphia.

While Amtrak was replacing its AEM-7s, MARC initially decided in 2013 to phase out its electric operations on the Penn Line altogether and retire both its AEM-7 and Bombardier–Alstom HHP-8 locomotives, but the railroad instead started a refurbishment program for its HHP-8s in 2017. As of September 2017, the first HHP-8 reconditioned under this program had been delivered and was undergoing successful testing. MARC selected the Siemens Charger diesel locomotive as the replacement for its AEM-7 fleet in 2015. The last of the MARC AEM-7s were retired by April 2017, with the Chargers entering service in January 2018.

SEPTA continues to use electric traction, replacing its seven AEM-7s and lone ABB ALP-44, an improved AEM-7, with fifteen ACS-64s. The first SEPTA ACS-64, #901, entered revenue service on July 11, 2018. On December 1, 2018, SEPTA held a farewell excursion for the AEM-7 and ALP-44 locomotives along the Paoli/Thorndale Line.

=== Post-retirement ===
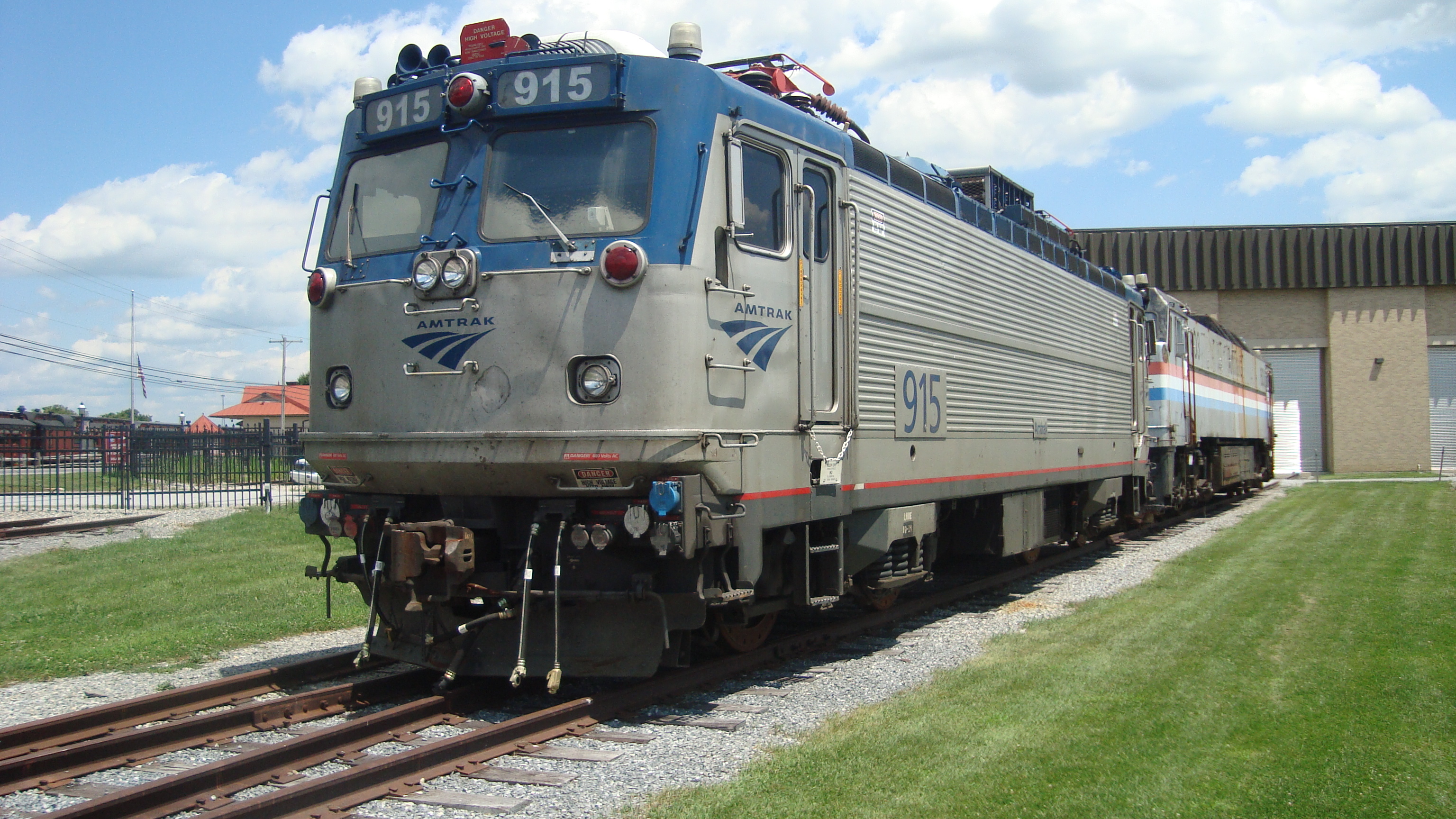
Amtrak AEM-7 No. 915 on display at the Railroad Museum of Pennsylvania

Two locomotives, ex-Amtrak Nos. 928 and 942, were moved to the Transportation Technology Center in July 2017. 15 AEM-7s entered storage at the Seaview Transportation Company in Rhode Island amid potential interest from the MBTA. When the MBTA declined to acquire the units, Seaview began scrapping them, with three units remaining in late 2024.

Caltrain, which operates commuter trains in the San Francisco Bay Area, purchased two retired Amtrak AEM-7s to test their electrification system once completed. The units would also serve as backup power for EMU cars. On June 7, 2018, the board awarded two contracts totalling approximately $600,000: one to purchase two AEM-7ACs from Mitsui & Co, and the other to Amtrak for refurbishment, training, and transportation to the Caltrain maintenance facility in San Jose. Locomotive Nos. 929 and 938 were delivered to California by Amtrak in June 2019.

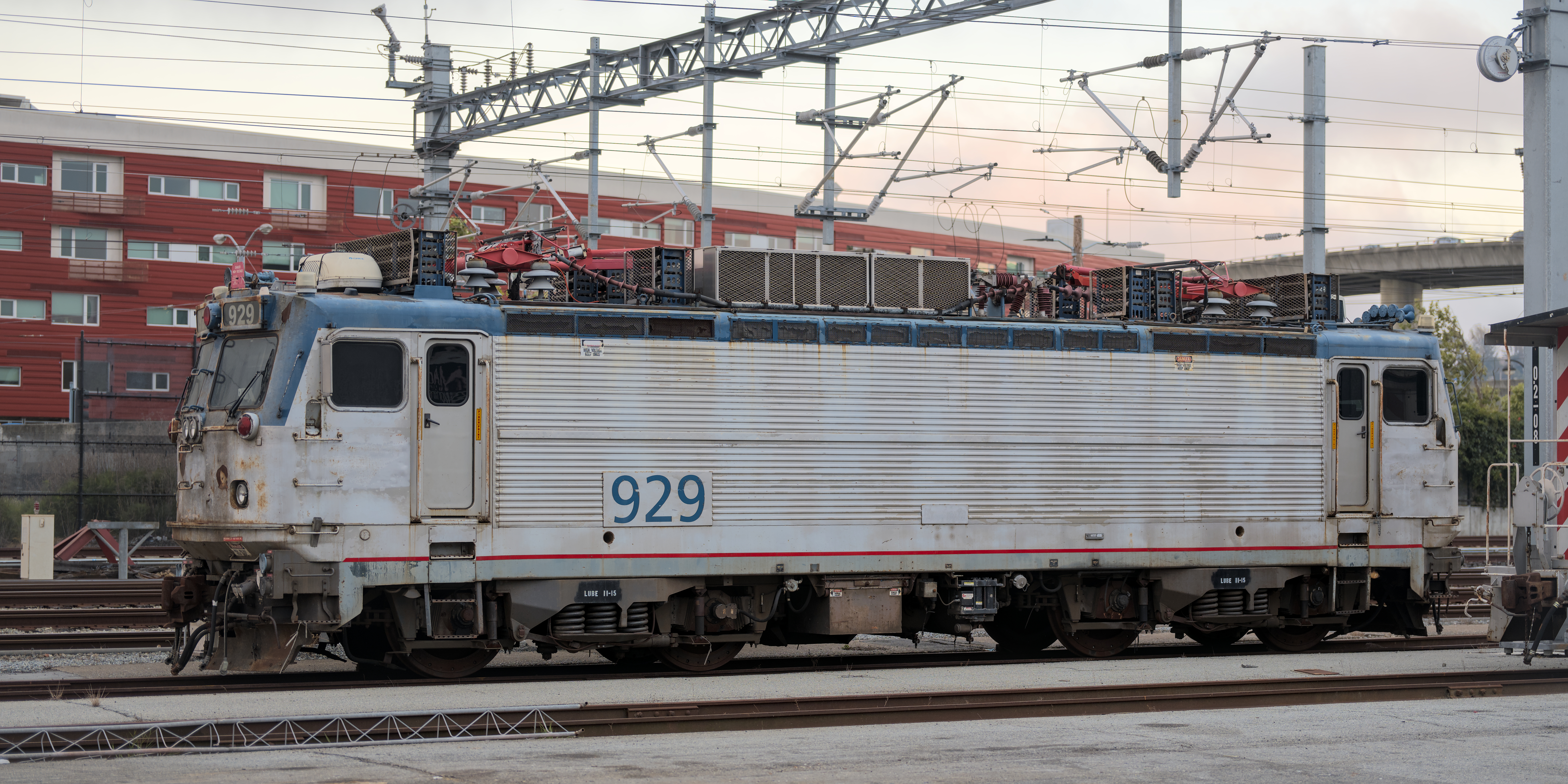
Locomotive 929 at Caltrain San Francisco station.

The seven SEPTA AEM-7s were leased to NJ Transit beginning in late December 2018 for the purpose of allowing NJ Transit to roster additional locomotives equipped with positive train control (PTC) in order to meet a deadline for operating PTC-capable equipment. However, they were never used and subsequently returned. SEPTA then used them exclusively for overnight work service during autumn, cleaning tracks and applying traction gel. In 2022, SEPTA sold the AEM-7s and ALP-44 for scrap.

Three ex-Amtrak units have been preserved: Nos. 915 at the Railroad Museum of Pennsylvania, 945 at the Illinois Railway Museum, and 917 at the Danbury Railway Museum. A fourth, no. 927, was purchased from Seaview by Northeast Rail Heritage Inc. in 2024 for preservation.

== See also ==
- ABB ALP-44 – A similar locomotive used by SEPTA and New Jersey Transit.
