= Siemens ACS-64 =

American electric locomotive

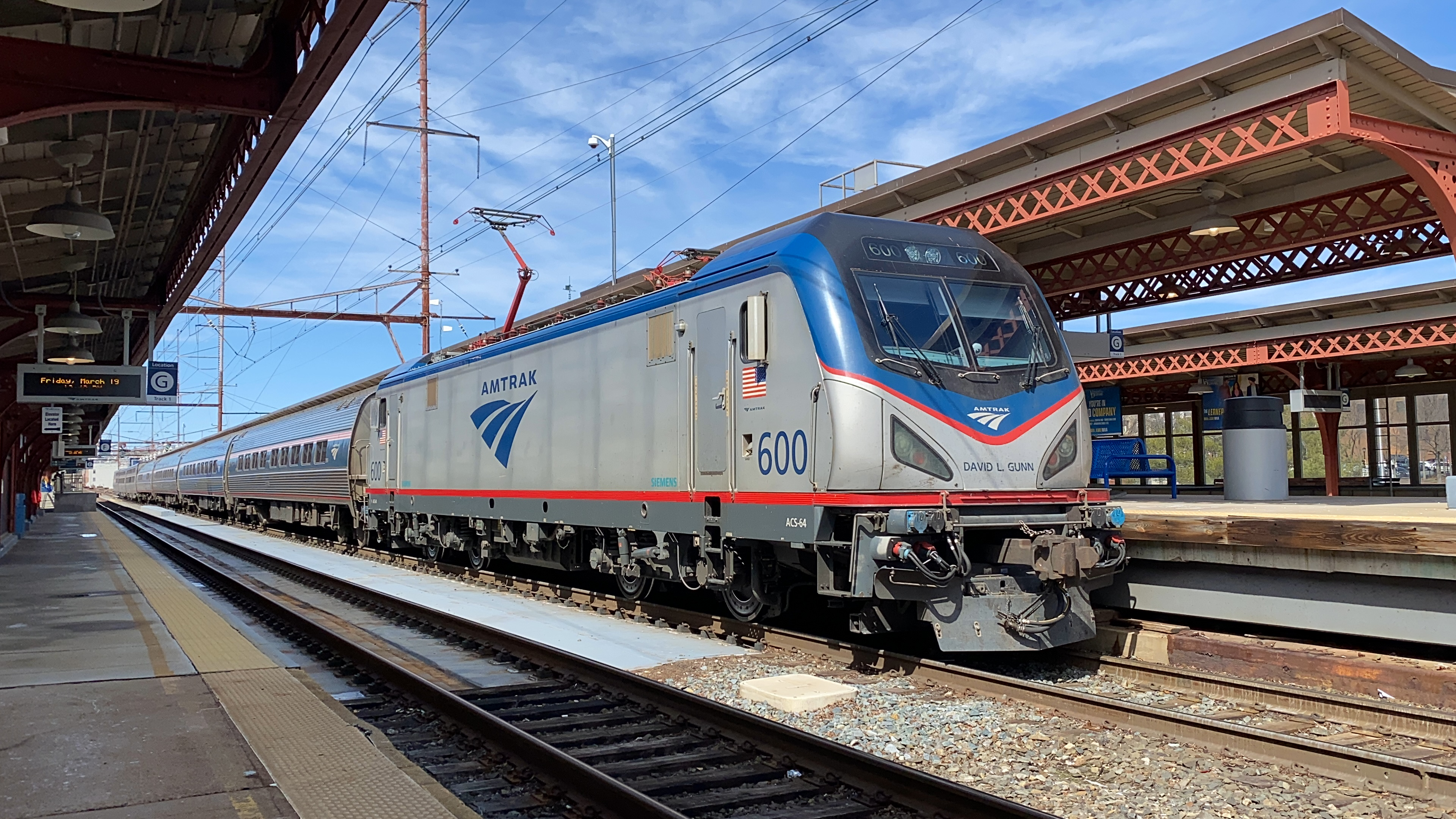
- Amtrak ACS-64 No. 600 with the Crescent in 2021
Type and origin
- Power type: Electric
- Builder: Siemens Mobility
- Build date: 2012–2018
Specifications
- Configuration
  - AAR: B-B
  - UIC: Bo'Bo'
- Gauge: 4 ft 8 1/2 in (1,435 mm) standard gauge
- Trucks: Siemens model SF4
- Wheel diameter: New: 43.98 in (1,117 mm); Worn: 40.98 in (1,041 mm)
- Minimum curve: 249.3 ft (76 m)
- Wheelbase: 32 ft 5.8 in (9.9 m) bogie center distance
- Length: 66 ft 8 in (20,320 mm)
- Width: 9 ft 9 1/2 in (2,984 mm)
- Height: 12 ft 6 in (3,810 mm) excluding pantograph
- Axle load: 54,250 lb (24,610 kg)
- Adhesive weight: 100%
- Loco weight: 215,537 lb (97,766 kg)
- Electric system/s: Overhead line: 25 kV 60 Hz AC; 12.5 kV 60 Hz AC; 12 kV 25 Hz AC
- Current pickup: Pantograph
- Traction motors: 3-phase, AC, fully suspended, Siemens built (Norwood, Ohio)
- Head end power: 1,000 kW (1,340 hp) 3-phase, 60 Hz, 480 VAC, 1,000 kVA
- Transmission: Pinion hollow shaft drive with partially suspended gearboxes
- MU working: Yes
- Loco brake: Regenerative braking and electro-pneumatic cheek-mounted disk brakes
- Train brakes: Electro-pneumatic
- Safety systems: Positive train control: ACSES II
Performance figures
- Maximum speed: Service: 125 mph (201 km/h); Design: 135 mph (217 km/h)
- Power output: Maximum: 6,400 kW (8,600 hp); Continuous: 5,000 kW (6,700 hp)
- Tractive effort: Starting: 72,000 lbf (320 kN); Maximum: 61,000 lbf (270 kN) @ 53.5 mph (86 km/h); 26,000 lbf (115 kN) @ 125 mph (200 km/h); Continuous: 63,000 lbf (282 kN) @ 40 mph (64 km/h); 20,000 lbf (89 kN) @ 125 mph (200 km/h)
- Factor of adh.: 2.99 (33.4%)
- Brakeforce: Maximum: 34,000 lbf (150 kN), 6,700 hp (5,000 kW)
Career
- Operators: Amtrak, SEPTA
- Numbers: Amtrak: 600–665, 667–670; SEPTA: 901–915
- Delivered: 2013–2018
- First run: February 7, 2014 with Amtrak
- Sources: except where noted

The Siemens ACS-64, or Amtrak Cities Sprinter, is an electric locomotive designed by Siemens Mobility for use on the Northeast Corridor (NEC) and the Keystone Corridor in the northeastern United States. The design was based on locomotives Siemens created for use in Europe and Asia, but with changes to comply with American standards. The ACS-64 is built at the Siemens factory in Florin, California, located outside of Sacramento.

The first 70 locomotives were built for Amtrak to replace the railroad's fleet of aging AEM-7 and unreliable HHP-8 locomotives. The first ACS-64 entered service in February 2014 and deliveries continued until August 2016.

The Southeastern Pennsylvania Transportation Authority (SEPTA), in Southeastern Pennsylvania, operates a fleet of 15 ACS-64s since August 2018, on the agency's Regional Rail Lines.

== Design ==
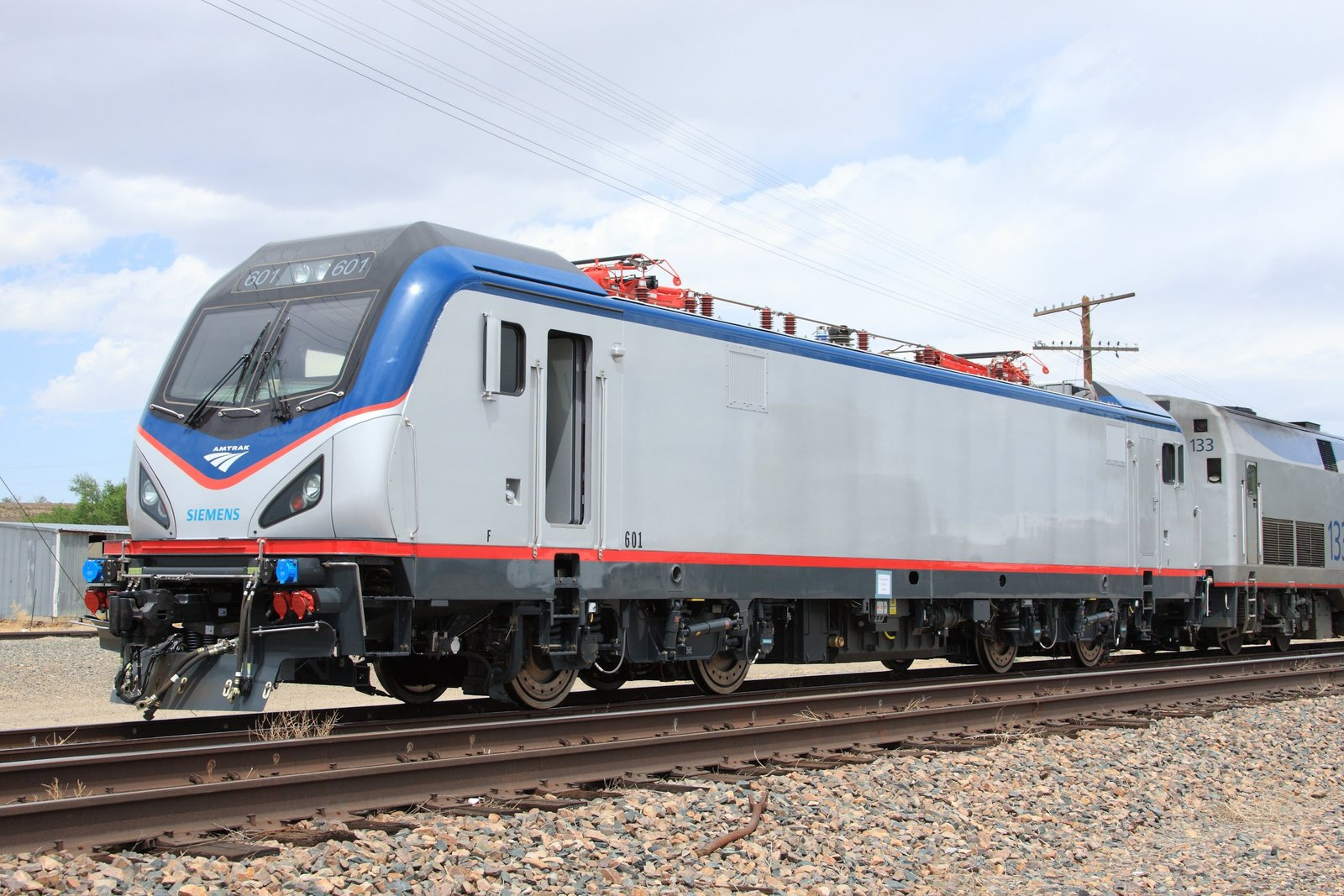
Amtrak ACS-64 No. 601, testing at Transportation Technology Center on June 8, 2013. 601 was later involved in the 2015 Philadelphia train derailment.

The design is based on the EuroSprinter and the Vectron platforms, which Siemens sells in Europe and Asia. Significant structural changes to the design were made to comply with American crashworthiness requirements, including the addition of crumple zones and anti-climbing features as well as structural strengthening of the cab, resulting in a heavier locomotive than the previous models. The body is a monocoque structure with integral frames and sidewalls.

The locomotives are able to operate from the 25 kV 60 Hz, 12.5 kV 60 Hz, and 12 kV 25 Hz AC power supplies used on the Northeast Corridor, and have a maximum power of 6,400 kilowatts (8,600 hp). The locomotives are designed to be capable of accelerating 18 Amfleet cars to maximum speeds as high as 125 miles per hour (201 km/h) on the Northeast Corridor in a little over eight minutes, with trains of eight Amfleets taking two and a half minutes to reach the same speed. They had advanced safety systems, including specialized couplers designed to keep trains from rolling over, jackknifing, or derailing during a collision. Additionally, the new locomotives are more energy-efficient than those that they replace, and lack dynamic braking grids in favor of 100% regenerative braking, depending on grid receptiveness. Energy generated from the brake may also be used to meet HEP needs, further reducing current draw from the grid.

Each locomotive has two electrical converter units with three IGBT based, water cooled output inverters per converter. Two of the inverters power the traction motors; the third unit supplies head-end and auxiliary power. The HEP/auxiliary inverters are dual-redundant and identical (rated 1,000 kW or 1,300 hp), allowing the locomotive to remain in service should one inverter fail en route. The locomotive bogies are fabricated steel designs, with low-lying traction links and center pivot pin. The traction motors are frame-mounted, with torque transmitted via a hollow shaft drive. Locomotive braking is facilitated by cheek mounted disc brakes on each wheel.

The locomotives are compliant with the "Buy America Act" and were assembled at the Siemens factory in Florin, California, with traction and electrical equipment being manufactured at Siemens facilities in Norcross and Alpharetta, Georgia. Traction inverters were manufactured in Alpharetta, and the traction motors and gear units were manufactured in Norwood, Ohio.

== Amtrak ==
=== Procurement ===
In October 2010, Amtrak ordered 70 locomotives at a cost of US$466 million, to be delivered beginning in February 2013. The order was the second part of Amtrak's company-wide fleet-replacement program, after an order for 130 Viewliner II passenger cars was placed in July 2010. On June 30, 2011, US Secretary of Transportation Ray LaHood announced that Amtrak had received a $562.9 million loan from the federal government's Railroad Rehabilitation and Improvement Financing program for the new locomotives. The additional funding over and above the $466 million will cover capital spare parts and facility improvements to accommodate the ACS-64s.

Amtrak and Siemens Mobility unveiled the first three completed locomotives on May 13, 2013. They were tested during the summer of 2013: Nos. 600 and 601 at the Transportation Technology Center in Pueblo, Colorado, and No. 602 on the NEC.

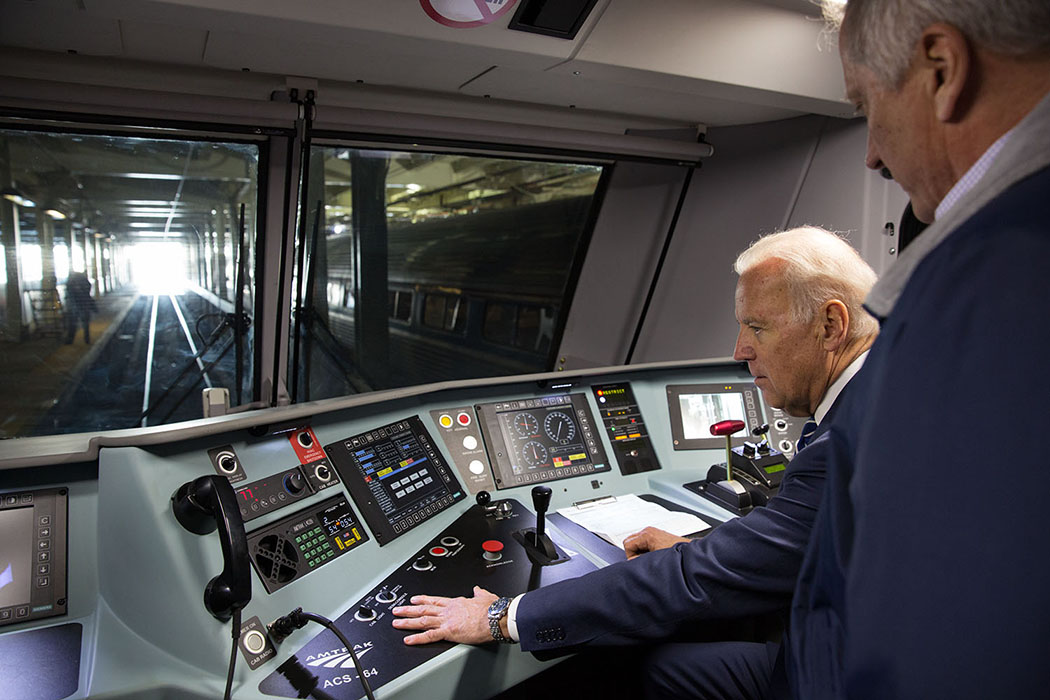
Then-Vice President Joe Biden sits at the controls of ACS-64 No. 600 at a publicity event on February 6, 2014

On February 6, 2014, then-Vice President Joe Biden visited 30th Street Station in Philadelphia to tour ACS-64 #600. In his subsequent remarks he stressed the importance of infrastructure investment as well as the important role Amtrak's new locomotives will play in serving the critical artery of the Northeast Corridor.

Amtrak and Siemens celebrated the completion of the last ACS-64, No. 670, in Florin, California, on June 2, 2016. The celebration concluded with unit No. 670 being towed by Amtrak CEO Joe Boardman's train bound for Washington, D.C. Locomotive No. 670 entered service in August 2016, completing the acceptance of the Amtrak order.

=== Service ===
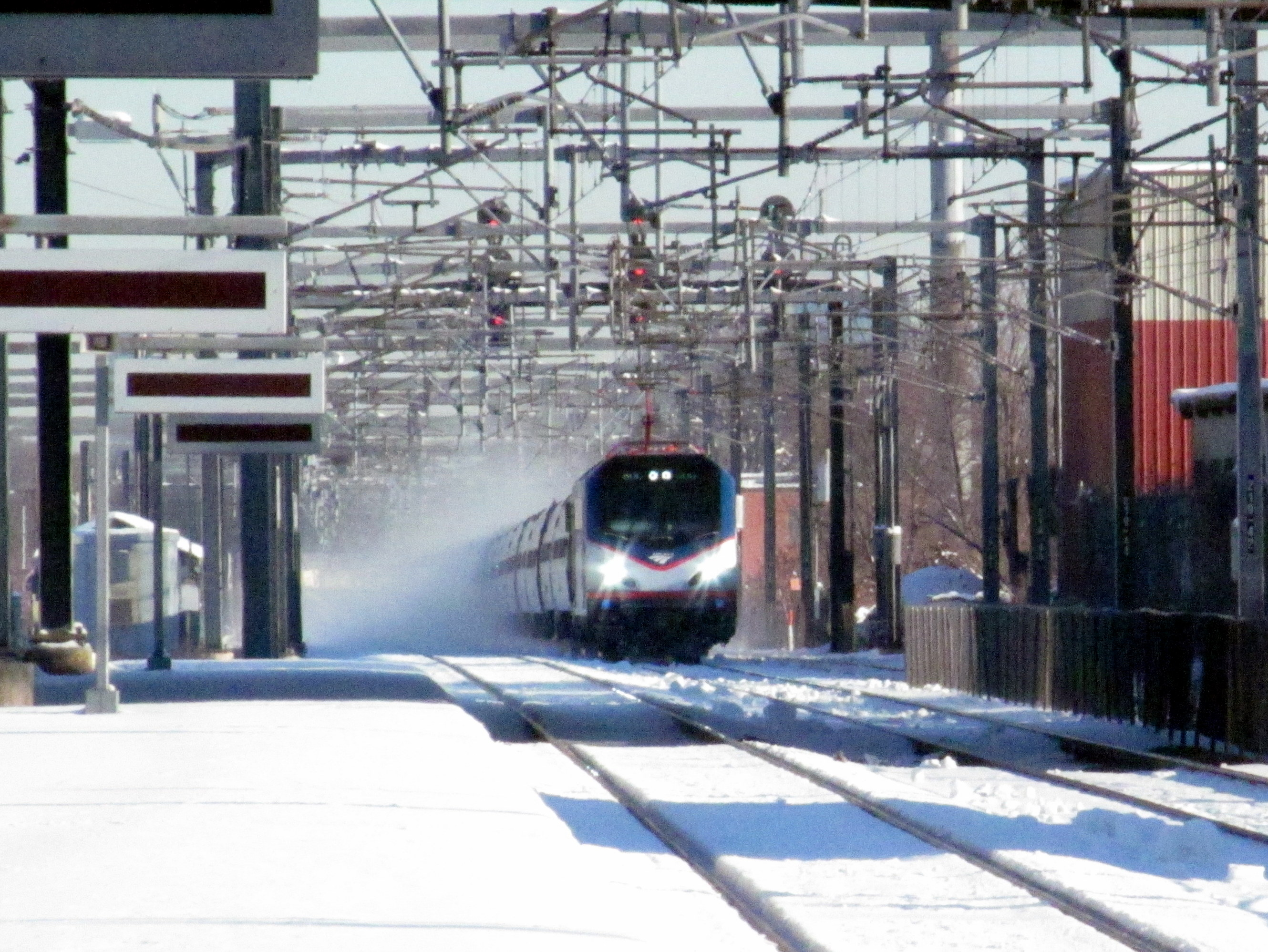
Amtrak ACS-64 No. 600 leading its first revenue trip on February 7, 2014

Unit 600 entered service on February 7, 2014, on Northeast Regional train 171 from Boston to Washington, D.C. As the new locomotives entered service, they gradually displaced the electric locomotives that Amtrak had previously operated. The extra six ACS-64 units were to be used to increase the number of locomotives available for use at any point, and to add more frequent service in the future. The final unit, #670, was delivered from Siemens on June 2, 2016, and entered revenue service in August of the same year.

=== Airo modernization ===
On November 18, 2026, Amtrak and Siemens announced plans to modernize 18 ACS-64 locomotives for use with 10-car Airo trainsets. The upgrades include new communications, diagnostic, and operational systems, as well as electronically controlled pneumatic (ECP) braking. Each trainset will use two locomotives in a double-ended configuration. The modernization program will provide two locomotives for each trainset, with two additional locomotives held as spares. The locomotives will deliver a combined output of approximately 12.8 MW per trainset, providing rapid acceleration for operations at speeds of up to 125 miles per hour (201 km/h).

== SEPTA ==
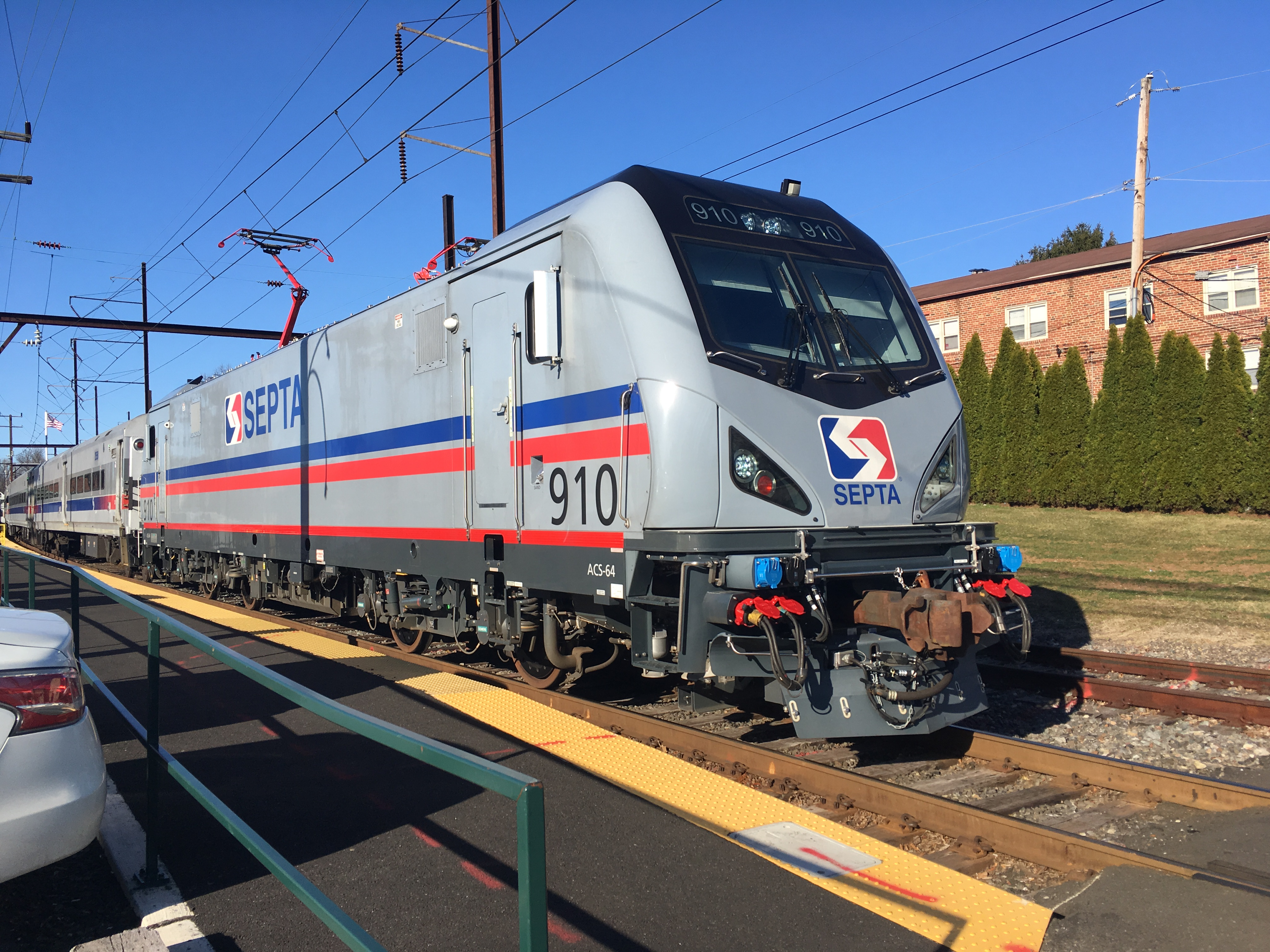
SEPTA ACS-64 910 leads a train out of Hatboro station

In May 2015, SEPTA (Philadelphia's mass-transit authority) approved an initial order for 13 ACS-64 locomotives for commuter service to replace its 7 AEM-7 and single ALP-44 locomotives on push-pull express trains, with an option for an additional five locomotives to be added to the order. On November 11, 2015, Siemens announced that it was awarded the $118 million contract for the initial 13 locomotives. The total contract value, including the option for additional locomotives, is worth $154 million.

On February 29, 2016, Amtrak unit 664 began test runs on SEPTA Regional Rail branches to test the height of the locomotives on SEPTA territory, and to ensure clearance through the Center City Tunnel. After testing the unit on most of SEPTA's lines, it was returned to Amtrak on March 21, 2016, for completion of its acceptance testing. From July 2016 until April 2017, SEPTA leased several ACS-64 units to pull five Amfleet cars and several MARC Train sets as emergency rolling stock after all Silverliner V cars were temporarily pulled from service.

SEPTA's first ACS-64 was delivered on December 14, 2017, by which time SEPTA had increased its order to 15 locomotives. The first unit entered service on the Paoli/Thorndale Line on July 11, 2018.
