= Atlantic City Express Service =

New York-New Jersey train service

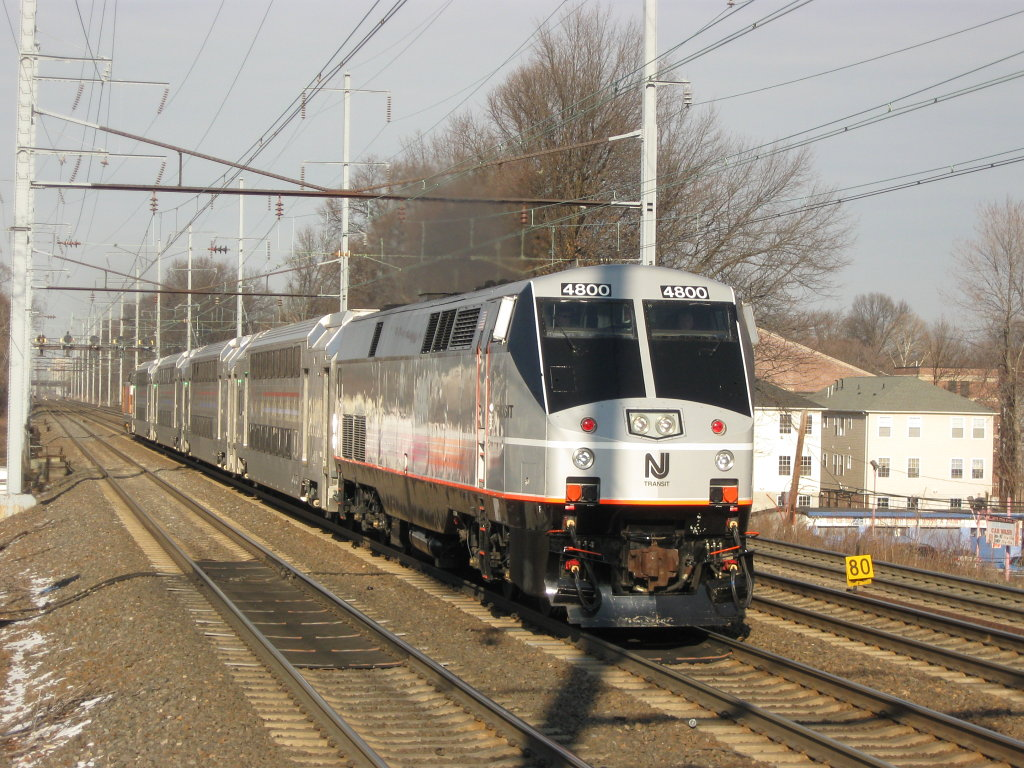
- GE Genesis diesel locomotive leads ACES train through Elizabeth express down the Northeast Corridor to Atlantic City.

Overview
- Service type: Inter-city rail
- Status: Discontinued
- Locale: New York City, New Jersey
- Predecessor: Atlantic City Express
- First service: February 6, 2009
- Last service: September 18, 2011
- Former operator: NJ Transit Rail Operations

Route
- Termini: New York Penn; Atlantic City
- Stops: 1
- Average journey time: 2 hours, 40 minutes
- Service frequency: Friday to Sunday only

On-board services
- Classes: Coach, first class, private lounge
- Disabled access: Yes
- Seating arrangements: Reserved
- Catering facilities: Café
- Baggage facilities: Luggage racks

Technical
- Rolling stock: GE Genesis P40DC & ALP-44 locomotives Bombardier MultiLevel Coaches
- Track owners: Amtrak, NJ Transit

The Atlantic City Express Service (ACES) was an inter-city rail service, operating from February 2009 until September 2011. It was operated by New Jersey Transit under contract and funded by the Casino Reinvestment Development Authority, with support from the Borgata, Caesars, and Harrah's casinos. The train provided summer seasonal service between New York City and Atlantic City three days a week, operating along the Northeast Corridor and Atlantic City Line. The train was formally cancelled on March 9, 2012.

== Background ==
With the success of NJT's commuter service to Atlantic City, talks about direct service to New York were discussed. In June 2006, the board of New Jersey Transit accepted a plan for an express service between Atlantic City, New Jersey and New York Penn Station in Midtown Manhattan, for a three-year trial initially slated to begin in 2007 (Newark Penn was not initially intended as a stop, but it would be added during the planning stages). Because of delays in acquiring the cars and preparing the needed motive power (the 8 cars for this service were part of a larger 329-car order, and the four diesel locomotives were acquired from Amtrak), the service did not begin until February 2009.

The fleet was composed of eight bilevel rail cars carrying both ACES and NJ Transit markings, with service funded by the Casino Reinvestment Development Authority and three casinos, Caesars, Harrah's, and the Borgata. Each train contained 300 seats with 4 cars per train. The multi-level cars' interior was customized for the ACES service, adding reclining leather seating across all classes and upper decks were dedicated to first-class seating in a 2x1 arrangement with at-seat food and beverage service. Trains also featured rentable private lounge space for groups of four and for coach passengers a small café offered food and beverages for sale.

In January 2011, service was suspended until May, citing low ridership and a $6 million loss in the first year of operations. Service resumed May 13, 2011 and ended September 18, 2011. The formal discontinuation of the route was announced on March 9, 2012.

The ACES passenger cars were converted to regular NJT cars by Bombardier between 2013 and 2014. They re-entered NJT service in mid-2014.

== ACES fares ==
Tickets for the ACES service were priced on a dynamic pricing scale, with tickets varying between $29 and $69 for one-way coach travel, first-class service available for a $20 upgrade from the coach fare, and lounge rental available for a $200 to $300 upgrade from the coach fare.

== Route ==
Trains picked up passengers at New York Penn Station and Newark Penn Station, then ran non-stop to/from the Atlantic City Rail Terminal in about two-and-a-half to three hours.

Typically, southbound trains departed New York pushed by an ALP-44 electric locomotive and led by a dormant GE P40DC diesel locomotive until Frankford Junction in North Philadelphia. At this junction in North Philadelphia, the diesel engine started, the train reversed direction and was pushed by the P40DC along the Atlantic City Line. Northbound, the P40DC pulled the train to Frankford Junction, where the pantograph on the ALP-44 was raised, and the electric locomotive pulled the train up the Northeast Corridor to New York.

== See also ==
- Atlantic City Express (Amtrak train)
- Blue Comet
- Pennsylvania–Reading Seashore Lines
- CapeFlyer
- Cannonball (LIRR train)
