= ABB ALP-44 =

Swedish/US electric locomotive class

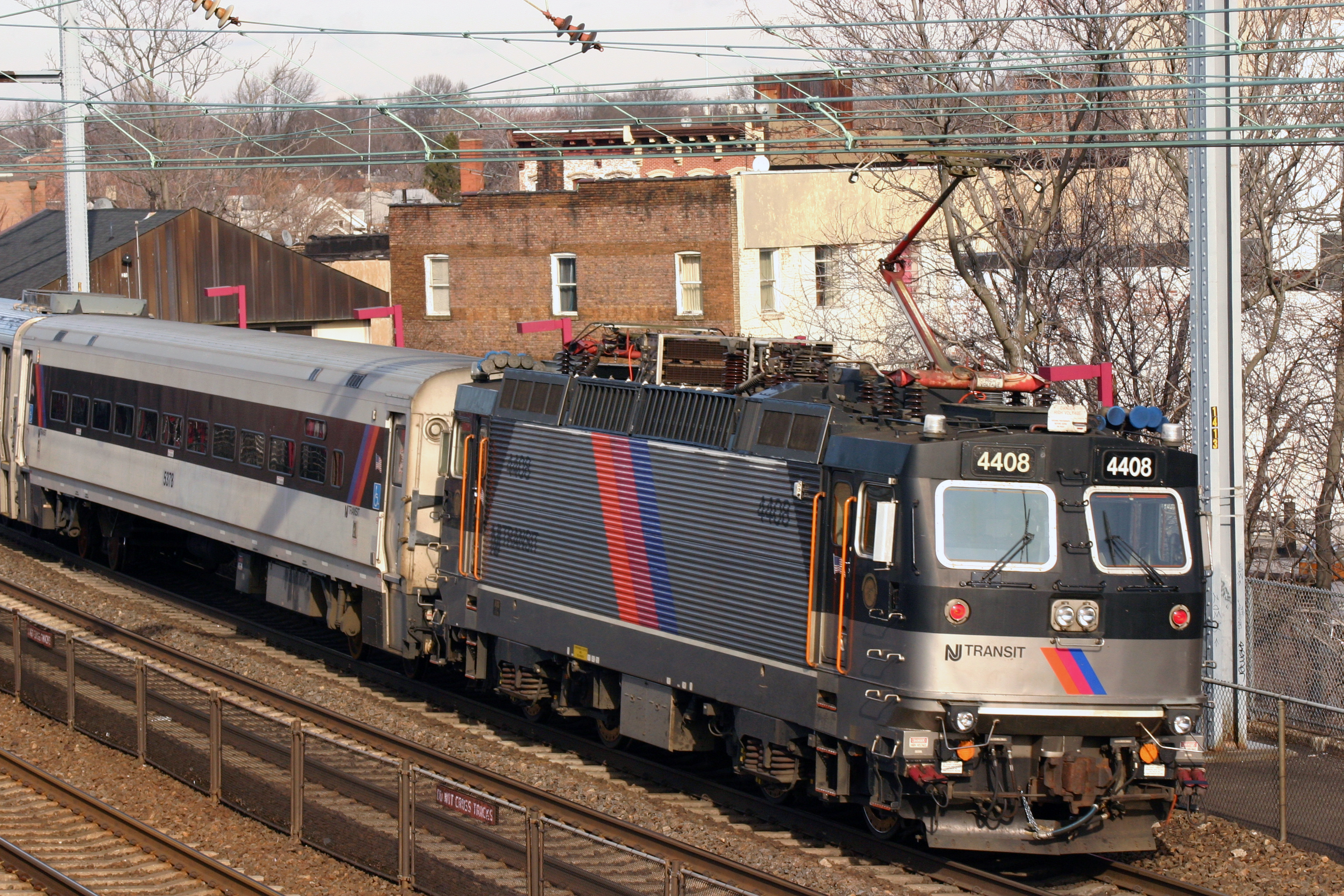
- NJT ALP-44O No. 4408 pushes an eastbound train into Elizabeth, New Jersey in 2006
Type and origin
- Power type: Electric
- Builder: ABB
- Model: SJ Rc/AEM-7
- Build date: 1989 – 1997
- Total produced: 33
Specifications
- Configuration
  - AAR: B-B
  - UIC: Bo'Bo'
- Gauge: 4 ft 8 1/2 in (1,435 mm)
- Driver dia.: 51.2 in (1,300 mm)
- Wheelbase
  - Truck: 9 ft 0 11/16 in (2.761 m)
- Length
  - Over couplers: 51 ft 1 25/32 in (15.590 m)
- Width: 10 ft (3.0 m) (over body); 10 ft 5 9/16 in (3.189 m) (over handrails)
- Height: 14 ft 8 1/2 in (4.483 m) (locked down pantograph); 15 ft 6 1/2 in (4.737 m) (fully extended pantograph, nominal)
- Loco weight: 207,000 lb (94,000 kg)
- Electric system/s: 12 kV 25 Hz AC; 12.5 kV 60 Hz AC; 25 kV 60 Hz AC
- Current pickup: Pantographs from catenary
- Traction motors: 4 × ABB LJH 108-8 (ALP-44O) 4 x ABB LJH 108-9 (ALP-44E/M/S)
  - Continuous: 1290 Amperes
- Gear ratio: 85:36
- Loco brake: Dynamic, ALP-44O/E WABCO 30E-CDW, ALP-44M/S WABCO EPIC 3102
- Train brakes: Direct Release air brakes
- Safety systems: Cab signals with Automatic Train Control
Performance figures
- Maximum speed: 125 mph (201 km/h)
- Power output: Max: 7,000 hp (5,220 kW); Continuous: 4,320 kW (5,793 hp)
- Tractive effort
  - Starting: 51,500 lbf (229 kN)
Career
- Operators: New Jersey Transit; SEPTA
- Numbers: NJT: 4400 – 4431; SEPTA: 2308
- First run: 1990 (NJT); 1997 (SEPTA)
- Last run: 2012 (NJT); 2018 (SEPTA)
- Preserved: NJT ALP-44M 4424
- Disposition: One NJT unit preserved, remainder scrapped.

The ABB ALP-44 was an electric locomotive which was built by Asea Brown Boveri of Sweden between 1989 and 1997 for the New Jersey Transit and SEPTA railway lines.

== Service ==
=== New Jersey Transit ===
New Jersey Transit acquired 32 ALP-44s for use on its electric railway lines. The first fifteen, numbered 4400–4414 and designated ALP-44O (Original), were delivered in 1990 (prototypes 4400 and 4401 in late 1989). Five additional units, numbered 4415–4419 and designated ALP-44E (Extended), were delivered in 1995. The final 12 locomotives, numbered 4420–4431 and designated ALP-44M (Microprocessor), were delivered in 1996 for the new Midtown Direct service.

NJT's ALP-44s were to be overhauled for a cost of $2 million during a two-year period by Philadelphia-based Interfleet Technology. A car builder had not yet been selected to carry out the overhaul. However, by June 2009, NJT decided that it would be more efficient (economically and physically) to replace the ALP-44s rather than overhaul them, and exercised an option of 9 additional ALP-46A's to enable the replacement to take place.

By late 2011, all NJ Transit ALP-44 O, E, and M locomotives had been retired, having been replaced by the ALP-46 and ALP-46A locomotives. The exceptions were units 4405, 4407, and 4409, which were assigned to the Atlantic City Express Service (ACES); however, these remaining units were also placed into retirement with the cancellation of ACES service in early 2012. Units 4402, 4403, 4408, and 4410 were leased by Amtrak for work train service through the Hudson River tunnels for a period of time during summer 2011, but were returned.

During 2012, most NJ Transit ALP-44s were prepared for storage in groups of at most five at a time. This work included the removal of pantographs and having the cab windows covered with steel plating. These units were then moved to Port Morris Yard and the Lackawanna Cut-Off stub track for storage in Stanhope, New Jersey, where they were awaiting to be sold off. Four ALP-44M units numbered 4421, 4424, 4429, and 4430, remained stored at the Meadowlands Maintenance Complex; in July 2023, one of the units (4424) was donated by NJ Transit to the United Railroad Historical Society of New Jersey (URHS) in Boonton, NJ.

In early 2026, NJ Transit started to scrap the units stored on the Lackawanna Cut-Off stub track after putting the remaining 31 units for sale in the fall of 2025, including the three remaining units at the Meadowlands Maintenance Complex. The units on the cut-off and at the MMC were scrapped by March 2026.

=== SEPTA ===
SEPTA received a single ALP-44S (SEPTA) unit, No. 2308, from ABB, which was part of a damages settlement for a lawsuit stemming from the late delivery of N5 cars for the Norristown High Speed Line. The ALP-44S was a unique class of ALP-44, having nearly all ALP-44E internals, but with the EPIC 3102 microprocessor airbrake system of an ALP-44M. Much like the ALP-44Ms, the ALP-44S was plagued with software issues stemming from this airbrake system. 2308 was replaced, along with the AEM-7s, with the ACS-64 in October 2018, with a farewell trip on December 1, 2018.

After the farewell, 2308, as well as seven AEM-7's, were leased to NJ Transit to help alleviate a locomotive shortage due to positive train control installation on their locomotives. However, they were never used for New Jersey Transit and returned to SEPTA in May 2019. The AEM-7s and the ALP-44 were eventually reassigned to SEPTA work service until 2021. In February 2022, the AEM-7s and ALP-44 were withdrawn and sold off. As of late 2022, all AEM-7s and the ALP-44 have been scrapped.

== Specifications ==
The ALP-44 was based on the Rc6 model and designed specifically for New Jersey Transit as a variant of the EMD AEM-7 electric locomotive, used by Amtrak (until June 2016), MARC (until April 2017), and SEPTA (until December 2018). ALP-44 stands for ASEA Locomotive Passenger 4-Axle 4.32 MW. The ALP-44 is powered by overhead lines through one of the locomotive's two pantographs and can produce up to 7000 hp (5.2 MW) with a top speed of up to 125 mph (201 km/h). In commercial use, however, both New Jersey Transit and SEPTA ALP-44s were only cleared for speeds up to 100 mph (161 km/h).

=== ALP-44M ===
The ALP-44M is a variant of the original ALP-44 design. It includes microprocessor control for functions such as braking and the then new EPIC brake control stand. These locomotives were notorious for their faulty software, which frequently caused problems and kept them out of service for maintenance.

== Gallery ==
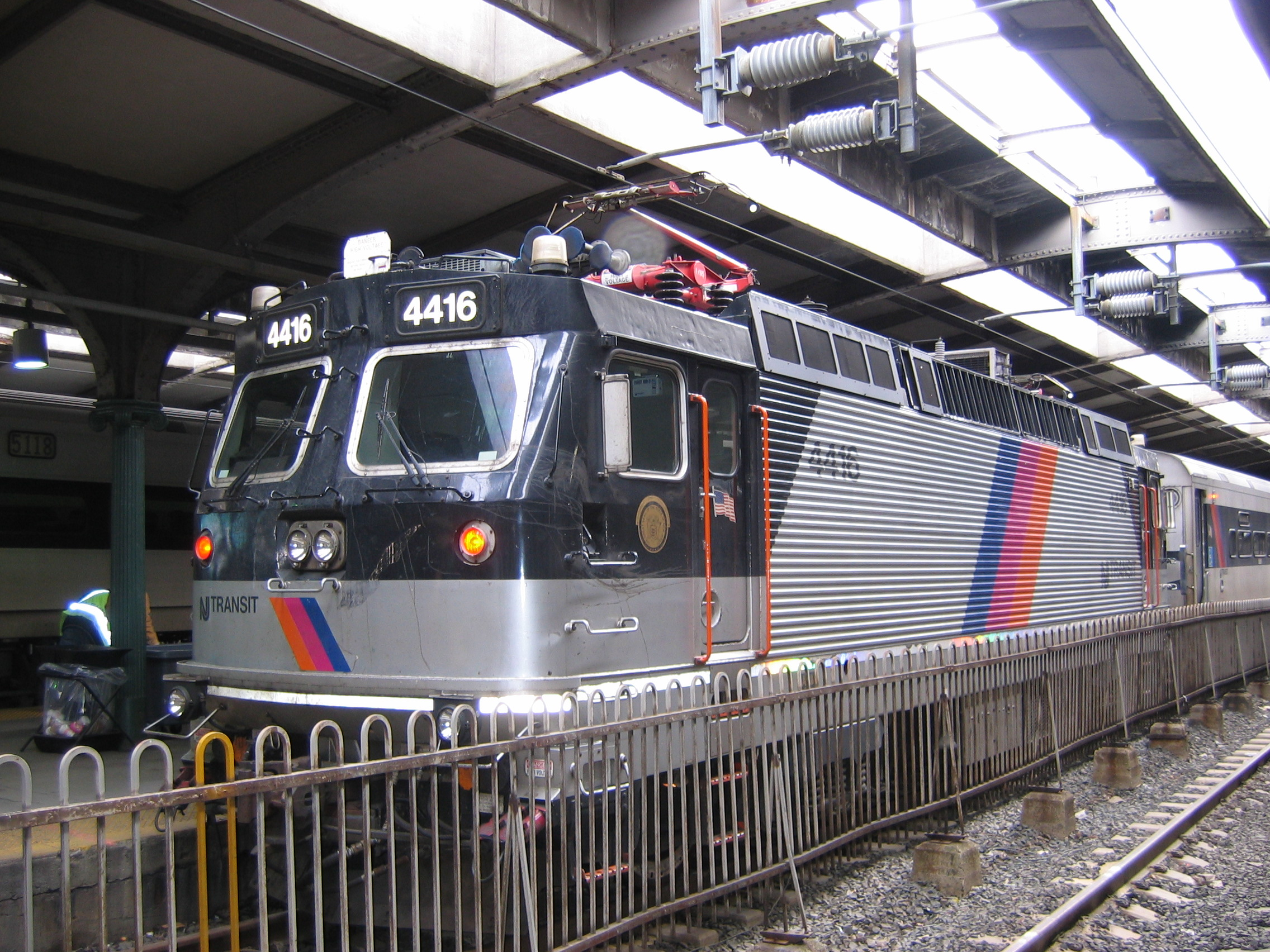
NJT ALP-44E No. 4416 standing at Hoboken Terminal in 2007

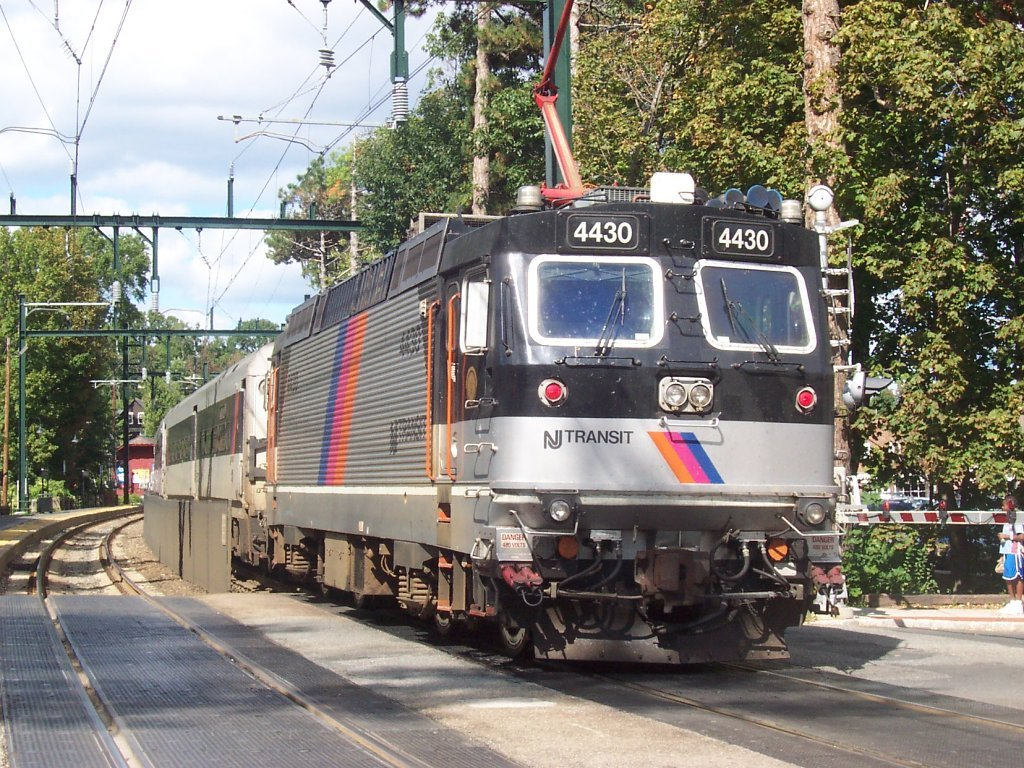
NJT ALP-44M No. 4430 pushing a train into Upper Montclair station in 2006

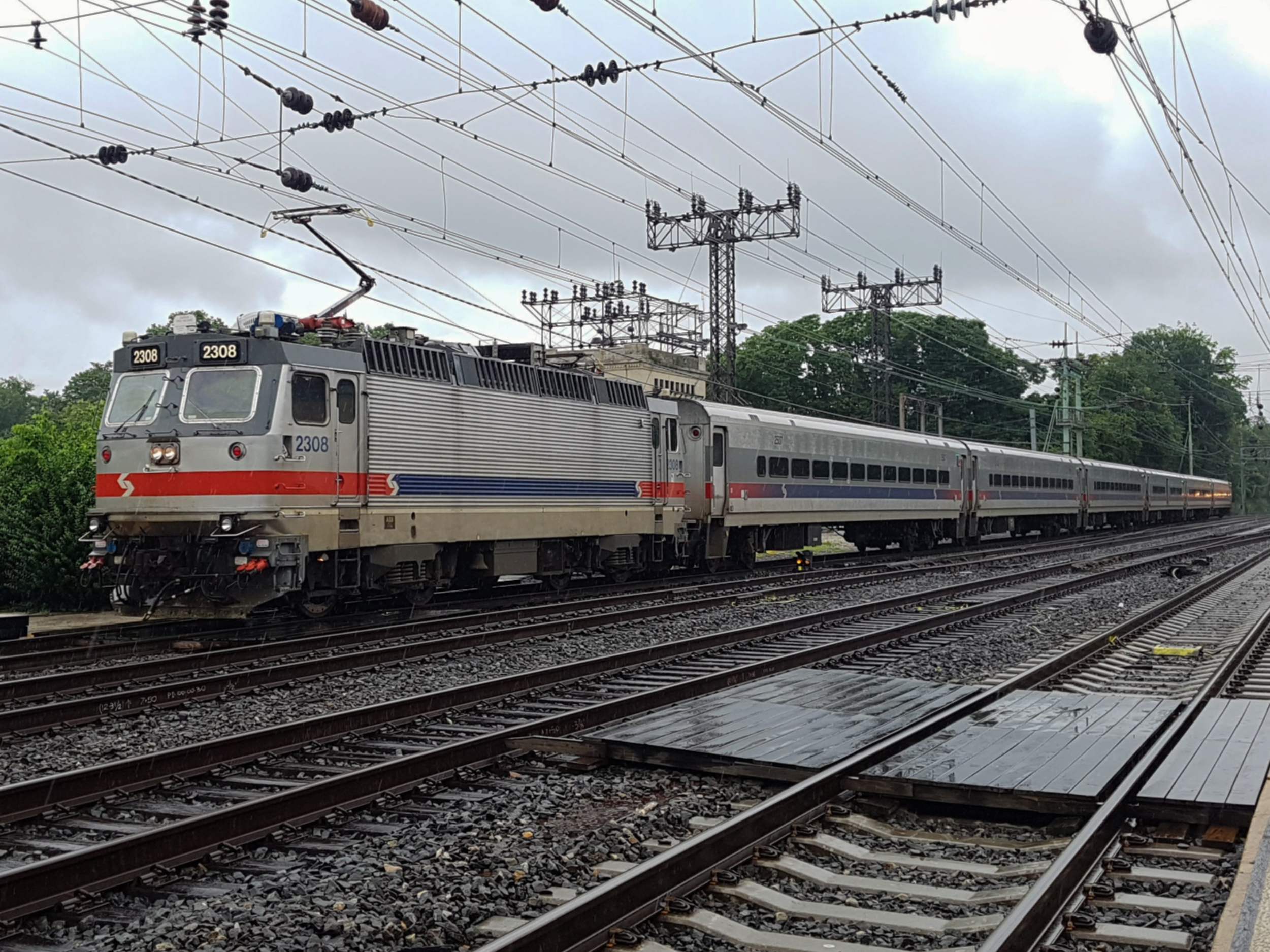
SEPTA ALP-44S No. 2308 at Bryn Mawr in 2018

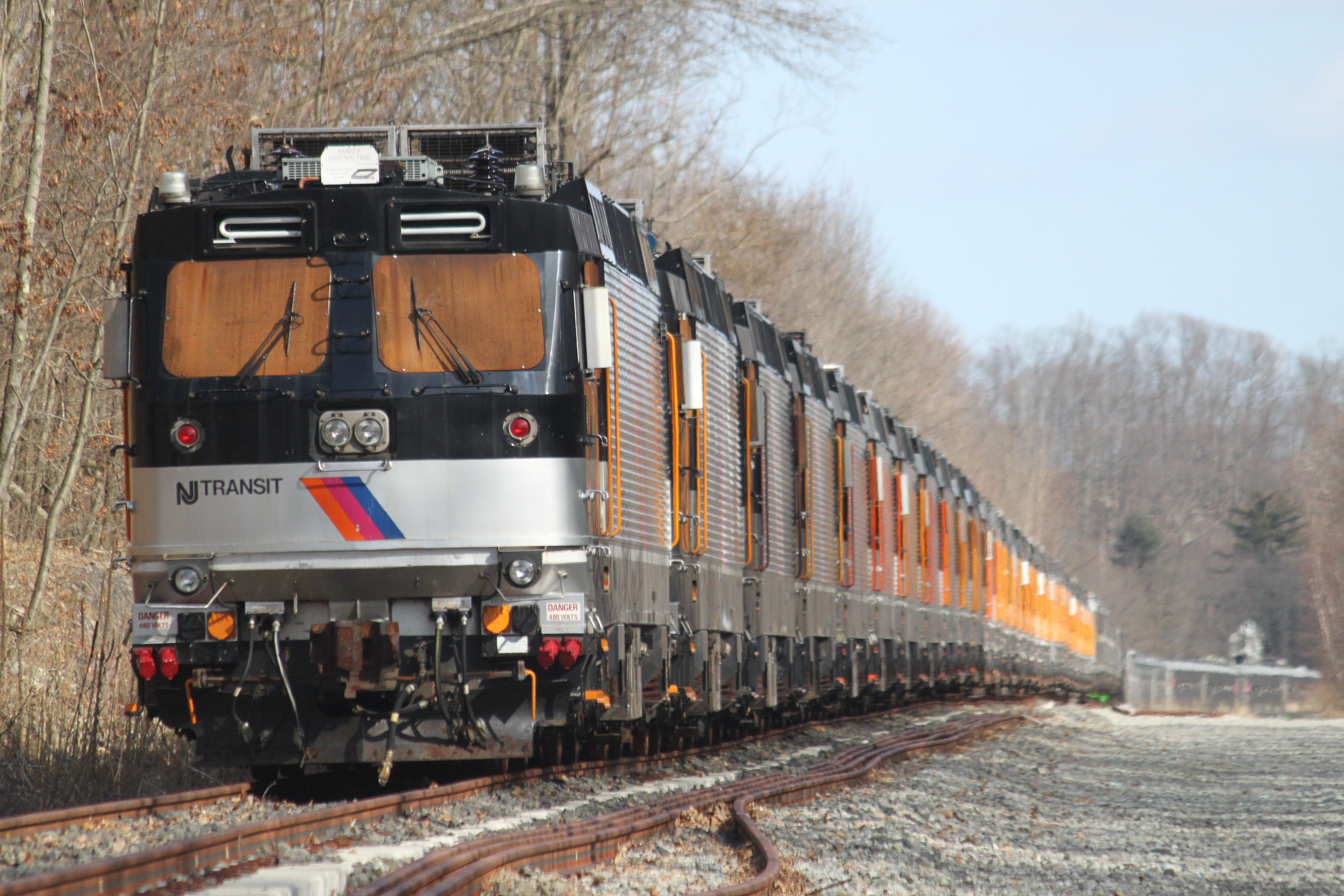
Retired ALP-44 locomotives and Arrow railcars stored on the Lackawanna Cut Off in 2013

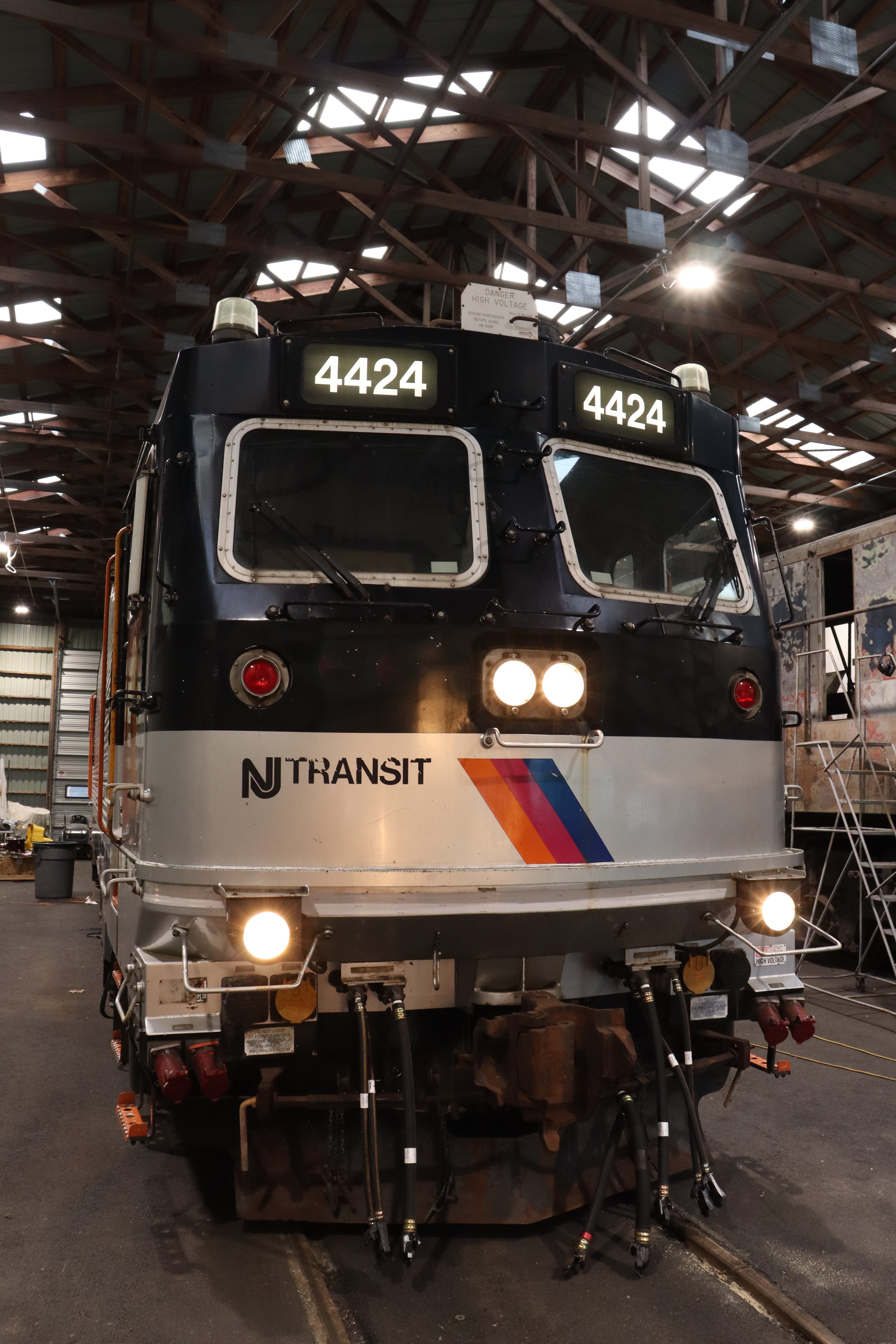
ALP-44M No. 4424 preserved at the United Railroad Historical Society of New Jersey in Boonton, NJ in 2023

== See also ==
- EMD AEM-7 — A similar locomotive used by Amtrak, MARC and SEPTA
