= Lower Hack Lift =

Lower Hack Lift Bridge
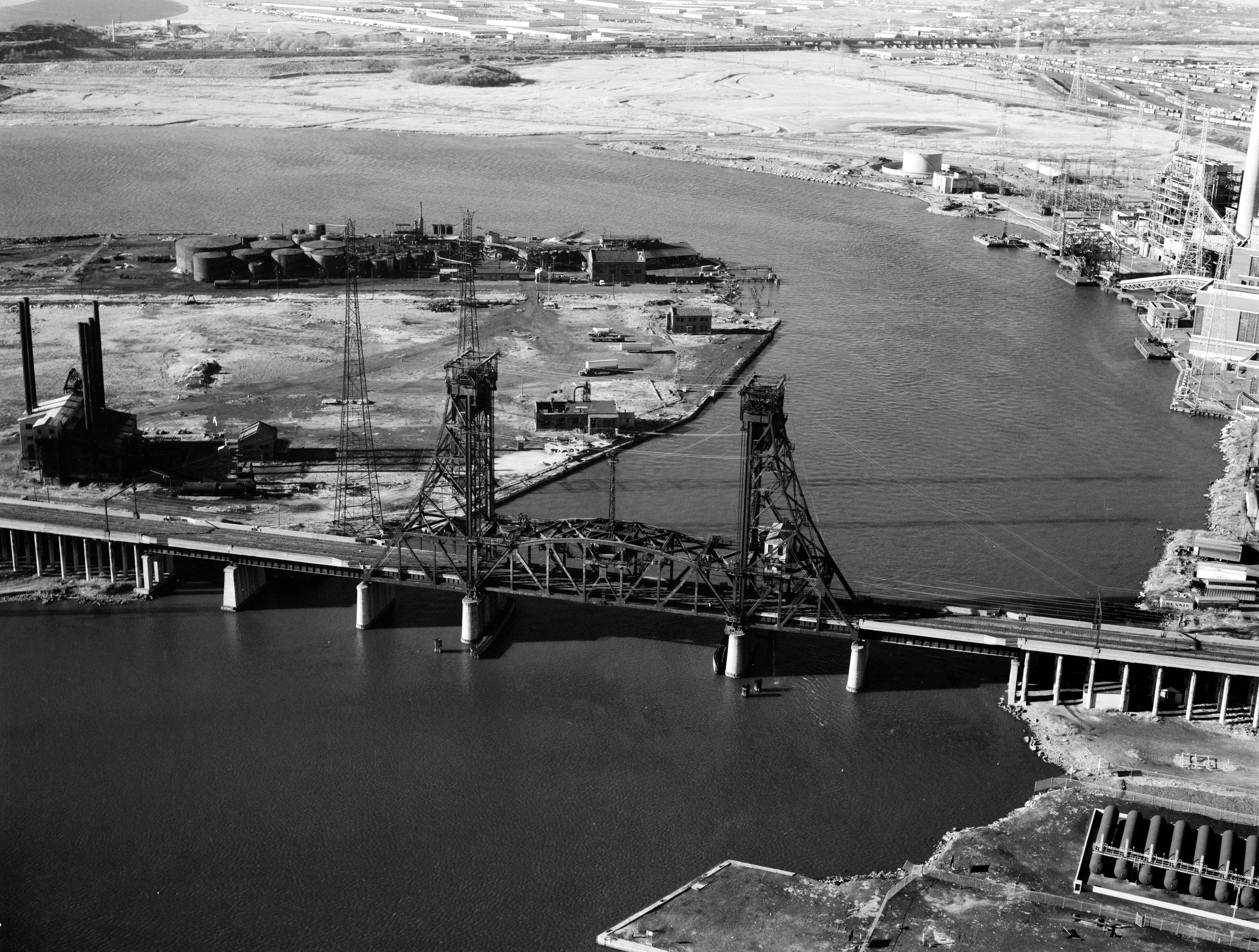
- Lower Hack Lift, looking southwest, in a 1979 photo
- Coordinates: 40.7432°N 74.0770°W
- Carries: New Jersey Transit
- Crosses: Hackensack River
- Locale: Jersey City, New Jersey and Kearny
- Other name(s): Erie-Lackawanna Railroad Bridge
- Maintained by: New Jersey Transit

Characteristics
- Design: Lift bridge
- Material: Steel

Rail characteristics
- No. of tracks: 3
- Track gauge: 1,435 mm (4 ft 8 1/2 in) standard gauge
- Electrified: 25 kV 60 Hz

History
- Designer: John Alexander Low Waddell
- Construction start: 1927
- Opened: October 2, 1928; 96 years ago

The Lower Hack Lift is a lift bridge carrying the New Jersey Transit Morristown Line across the Hackensack River at mile 3.4, Jersey City, New Jersey.

The three-track lift span was built in 1927–28 by the Delaware, Lackawanna and Western Railroad under the direction and design of John Alexander Low Waddell. The span was completed and opened October 2, 1928.

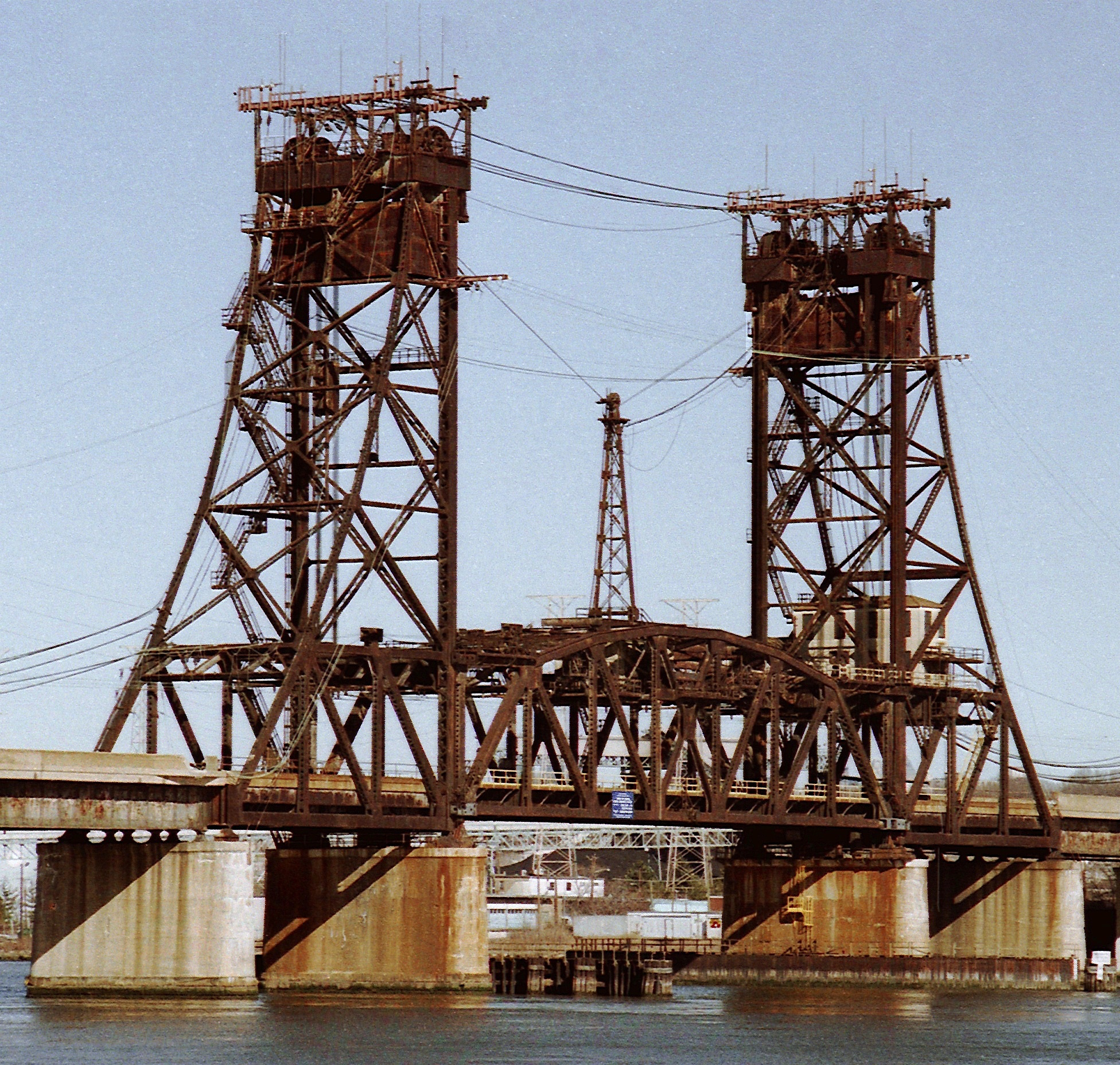
Seen from the southwest in 2006

In addition to the Morristown and Gladstone lines, Montclair-Boonton Line service and North Jersey Coast Line service (via the Waterfront Connection) also use Lower Hack to access Hoboken Terminal.

According to US Coast Guard regulations, Lower Hack shall open upon signal with at least one hour notice to the bridge tender at Upper Hack Lift on the Main Line.

== See also ==
- Upper Hack Lift (NJ Transit bridge at mile 6.9)
- List of bridges documented by the Historic American Engineering Record in New Jersey
- List of crossings of the Hackensack River
- NJT movable bridges
