= Bombardier ALP-46 =

German-built US electric locomotive class

Bombardier ALP-46/ALP-46A
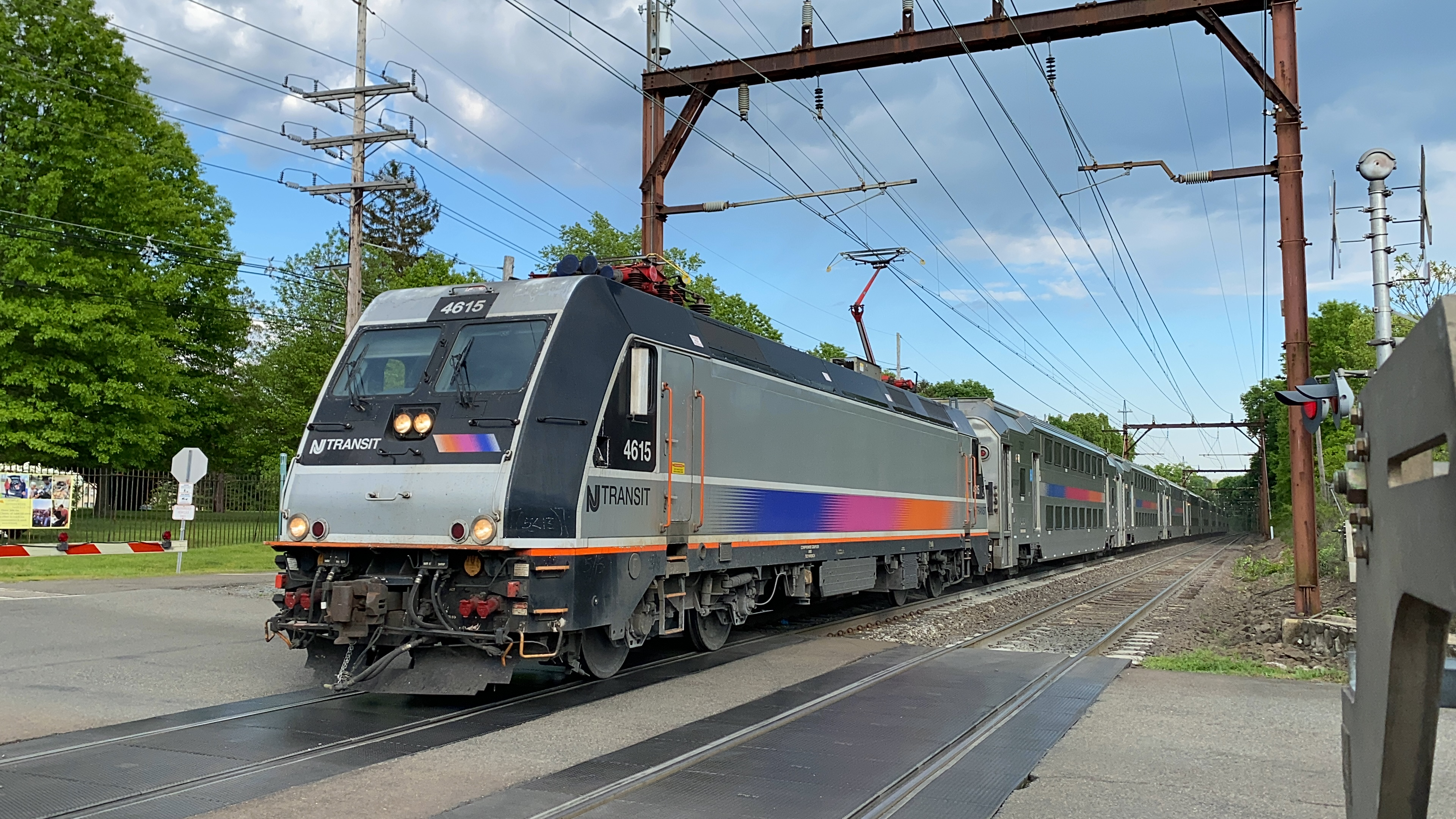
- NJT ALP-46 4615 pulling into Convent Station in New Jersey.
Type and origin
- Power type: Electric
- Builder: Bombardier/Adtranz
- Build date: 2001 – 2002*, 2009 –2011†
- Total produced: 29* + 36†
Specifications
- Configuration
  - AAR: B-B
  - UIC: Bo'Bo'
- Gauge: 4 ft 8 1/2 in (1,435 mm) standard gauge
- Driver dia.: 44 in (1,100 mm) (new); 41.2 in (1,050 mm) (worn)
- Minimum curve: 254 ft (77 m)
- Wheelbase
  - Truck: 8 ft 10 in (2.69 m)
- Length
  - Over couplers: 65 ft (20 m)
- Width: 9 ft 10 in (3.00 m)
- Height
  - Pantograph: 14 ft 11 1/2 in (4.559 m)
- Axle load: 46: 49,600 lb (22,500 kg); 46A: 50,706 lb (23,000 kg)
- Adhesive weight: 207,000 lb (94,000 kg); 51,000 lb (23,000 kg) (per axle)
- Loco weight: 46: 198,400 lb (90,000 kg); 46A: 202,822 lb (91,999 kg)
- Sandbox cap.: 4×778 lb (353 kg)
- Electric system/s: 12 kV 25 Hz AC Catenary; 12.5 kV 60 Hz AC Catenary; 25 kV 60 Hz AC Catenary
- Current pickup: pantograph
- Traction motors: 4× MITRAC DR 3700F (4 FIA 7065)
- Head end power: 480 V AC, 60 Hz, 3 phase, 1,000 kW*†
Performance figures
- Maximum speed: 46: 161 km/h (100 mph); 46A: 201 km/h (125 mph)
- Power output: at rail 46: 7,108 hp (5,300 kW) at rail 46A: 7,500 hp (5,600 kW)
- Tractive effort: 46, starting: 316 kN (71,000 lb_{f}), continuous: 245 kN (55,000 lb_{f}) at 50 mph (80 km/h); 46A : starting : ~316 kN (71,000 lb_{f}), continuous: ~ 240 kN (54,000 lb_{f}) at 85 km/h (53 mph)
- Brakeforce: dynamic 150 kN (34,000 lb_{f})
Career
- Operators: NJ Transit
- Numbers: NJT 4600 – 4628 (46); NJT 4629 – 4664 (46A)
- Sources: * ALP-46. † ALP46A. except where noted

The Bombardier ALP-46 is an electric locomotive built in Germany by Bombardier between 2001 and 2002 (and 2009–2011 for the ALP-46A) for use in the United States. It is derived from the German Class 101. New Jersey Transit (NJT) is the only railroad to operate this locomotive model, which is used across the electrified NJT system, specifically on the Northeast Corridor, North Jersey Coast, Morris & Essex, and Montclair-Boonton lines. These locomotives replaced the 32 ALP-44 locomotives, which were all retired by 2012.

== Orders and delivery ==
NJT ordered 29 locomotives: the first 24 locomotives in December 1999 and an additional five locomotives in September 2001.

They were built by Bombardier (formerly ADtranz) at their Kassel, Germany plant. The aesthetic design was done by Cesar Vergara. The first two locomotives were built as preseries locomotives for testing—4600 was tested on the TTCI test plant in Pueblo, Colorado, 4601 was sent to Kearny for testing on the NJT network. All locomotives were transported via road to the port of Bremen and shipped on Roro-ships of Wallenius Wilhelmsen Logistics to Port Newark-Elizabeth Marine Terminal, New Jersey.

In February 2008, NJT ordered twenty-seven 125 mph (201 km/h) top speed ALP-46A locomotives from Bombardier, which were to haul Bombardier MultiLevel Coaches. The estimated value of the order was €155 million (approximately $230 million). In June 2009, NJT took up an option for a further nine locomotives, and spare parts, at a cost of $72 million.

On November 12, 2009, Bombardier ceremonially handed over the first two completed ALP-46As to New Jersey Transit over at their Kassel plant in Germany.

They arrived on NJT property on December 13. Locomotive No. 4629 was shipped by rail to a testing facility in Pueblo, Colorado, while 4630 was placed on the rails at the Meadows Maintenance Complex in Kearny for testing on property and maintenance training.

All locomotives were delivered by April 5, 2011, and by May 7, 2011, all locomotives have entered regular revenue service.

== Variants and operations ==
Both the ALP-46 and ALP-46A have been used to haul NJ Transit's Comet IIM, IV, V, and Multilevel fleet. The ALP-46 was also used to pull Amfleet consists on Amtrak's Clocker service in its final days of operation.

=== ALP-46 ===
The ALP-46 locomotives produce 7,100 hp (5,300 kW) and are powered by overhead catenary. They can reach a top speed of 100 mph (161 km/h).

The ALP-46 is derived from the DBAG Class 101 locomotive, of which the operating speed is 200 km/h (124 mph).

The locomotives use Bombardier's MITRAC 3000 electric propulsion system. The system consists of a polyol-ester cooled transformer to reduce the catenary voltage which feeds two polyol-ester cooled GTO based traction converters (Bombardier MITRAC TC 3100 AC series). Each traction converter feeds the motors (Bombardier MITRAC DR 3700F series) of one truck.

=== ALP-46A ===
The ALP-46A locomotives use Bombardier's MITRAC 3000 electric propulsion system. The traction converters (Bombardier MITRAC TC 3360 AC series) are from a newer generation based on IGBT technology. The converters are water cooled and have individual inverters for each traction motor (Bombardier MITRAC DR 3700F series). Power at rail is increased to 7,500 hp (5,600 kW) and top speed is increased to 125 miles per hour (201 km/h), though NJ Transit restricts the speed to 100 mph.

== Images ==
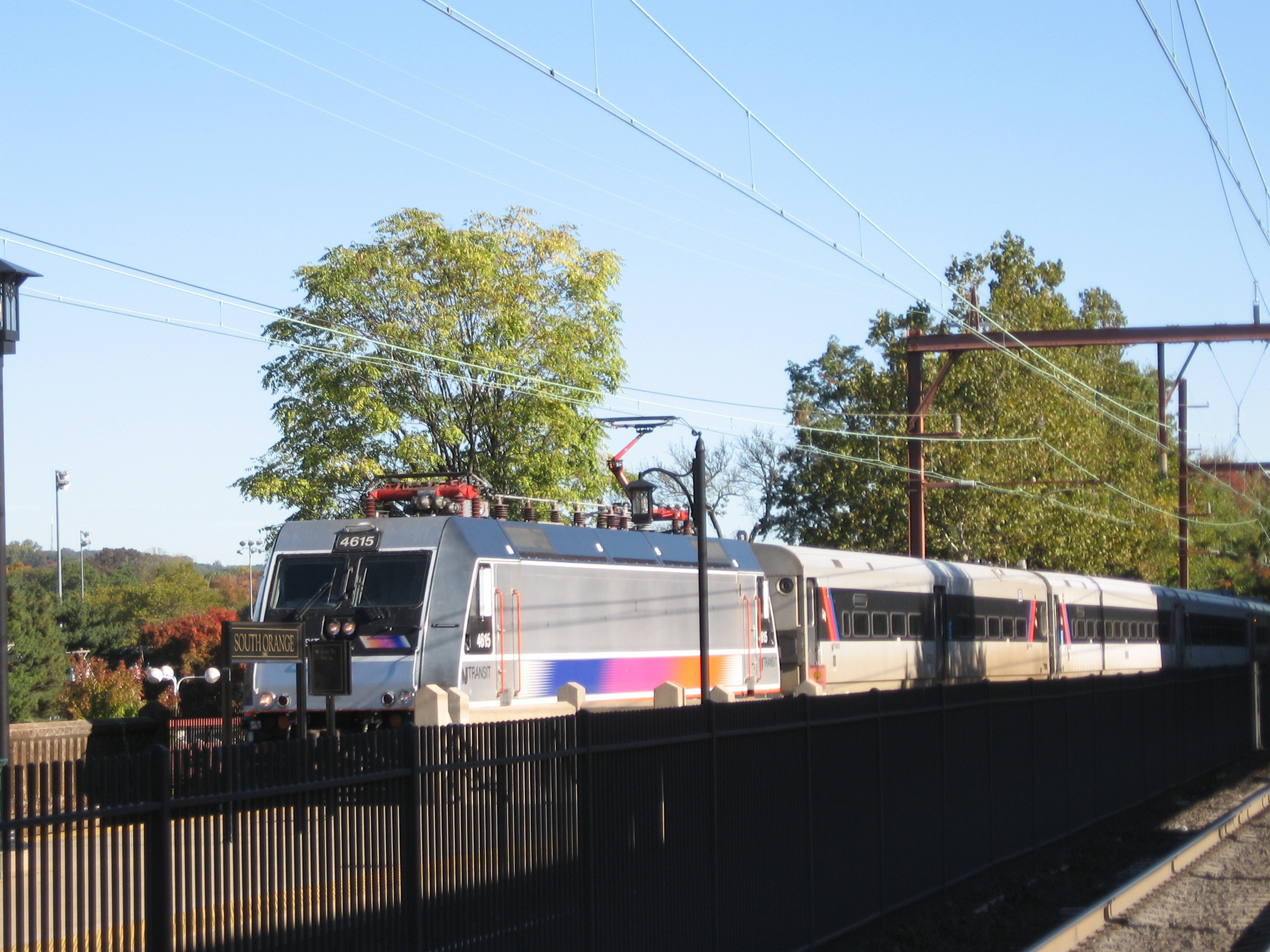
ALP-46 entering South Orange, New Jersey

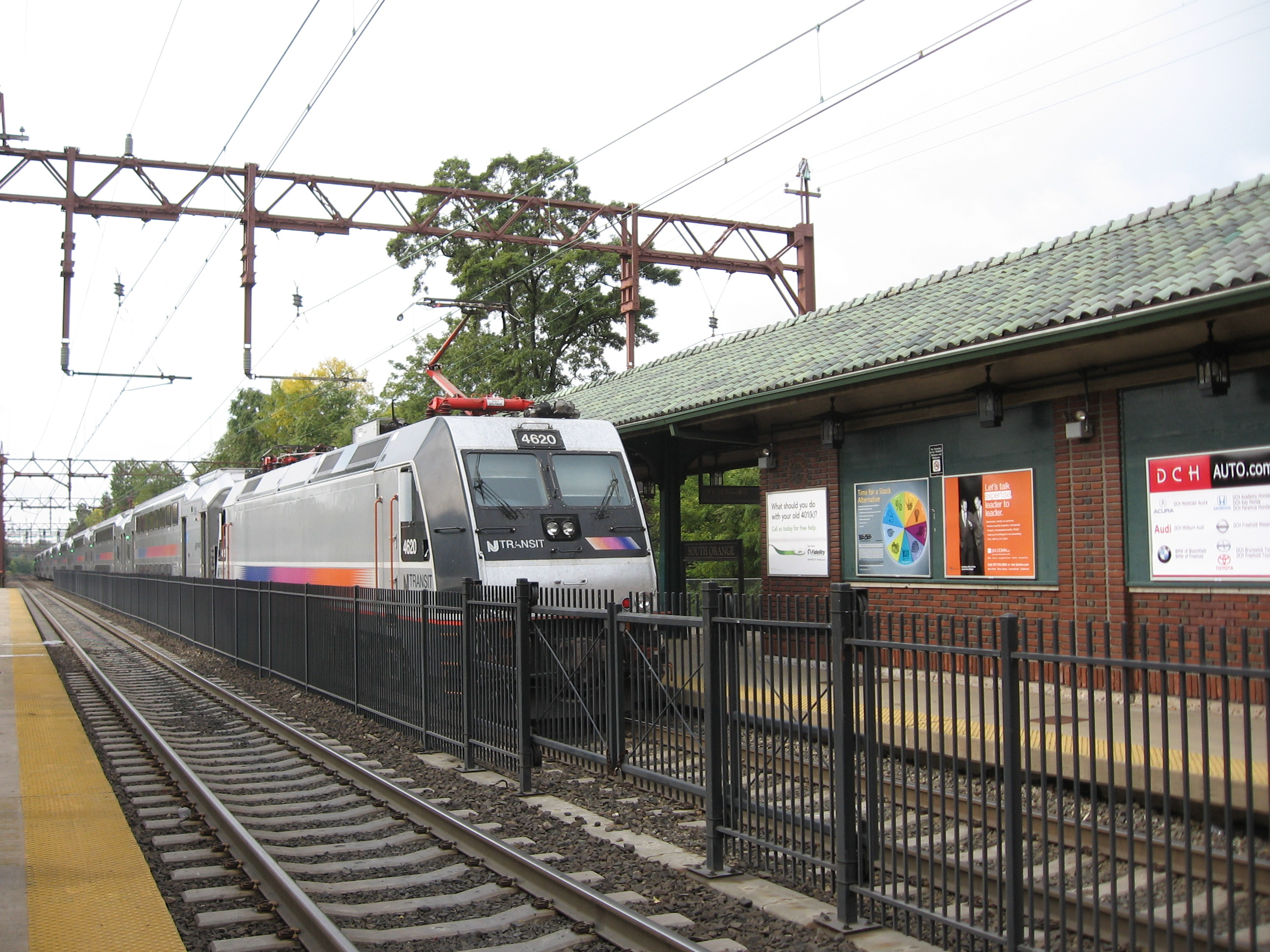
NJ Transit train with an ALP-46 leaving South Orange

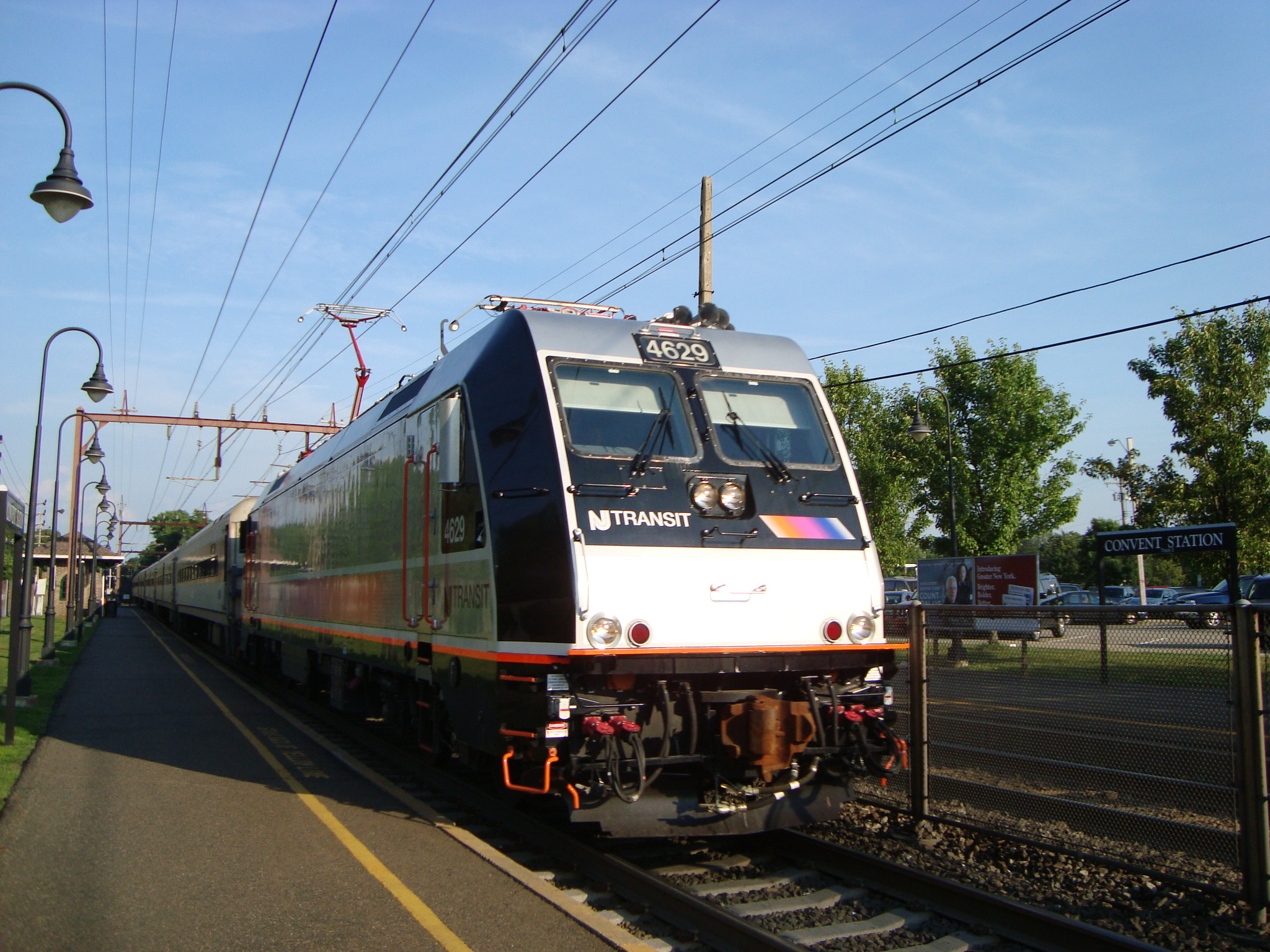
ALP-46A 4629 at Convent Station

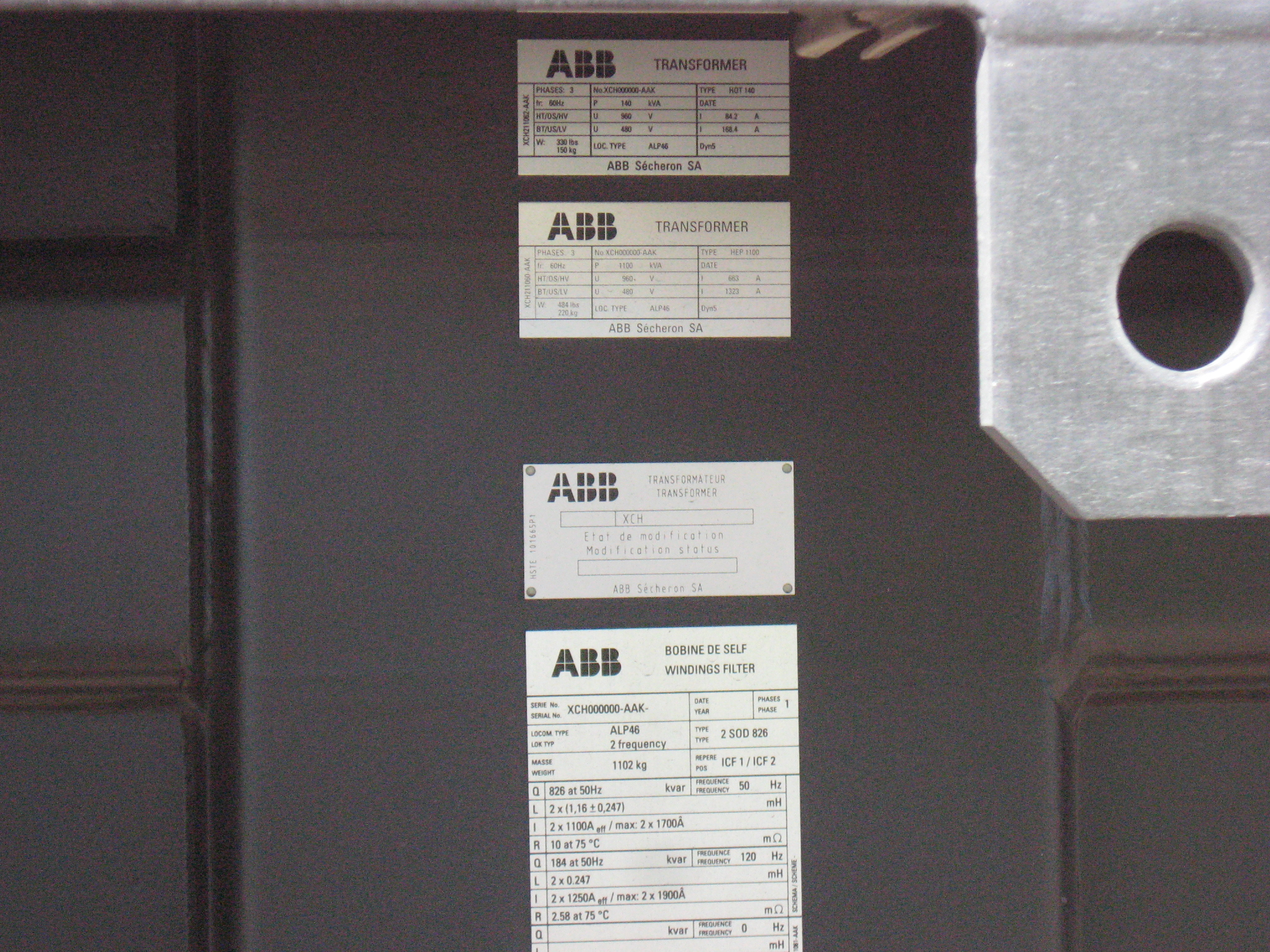
ABB HEP transformer on ALP-46A 4637

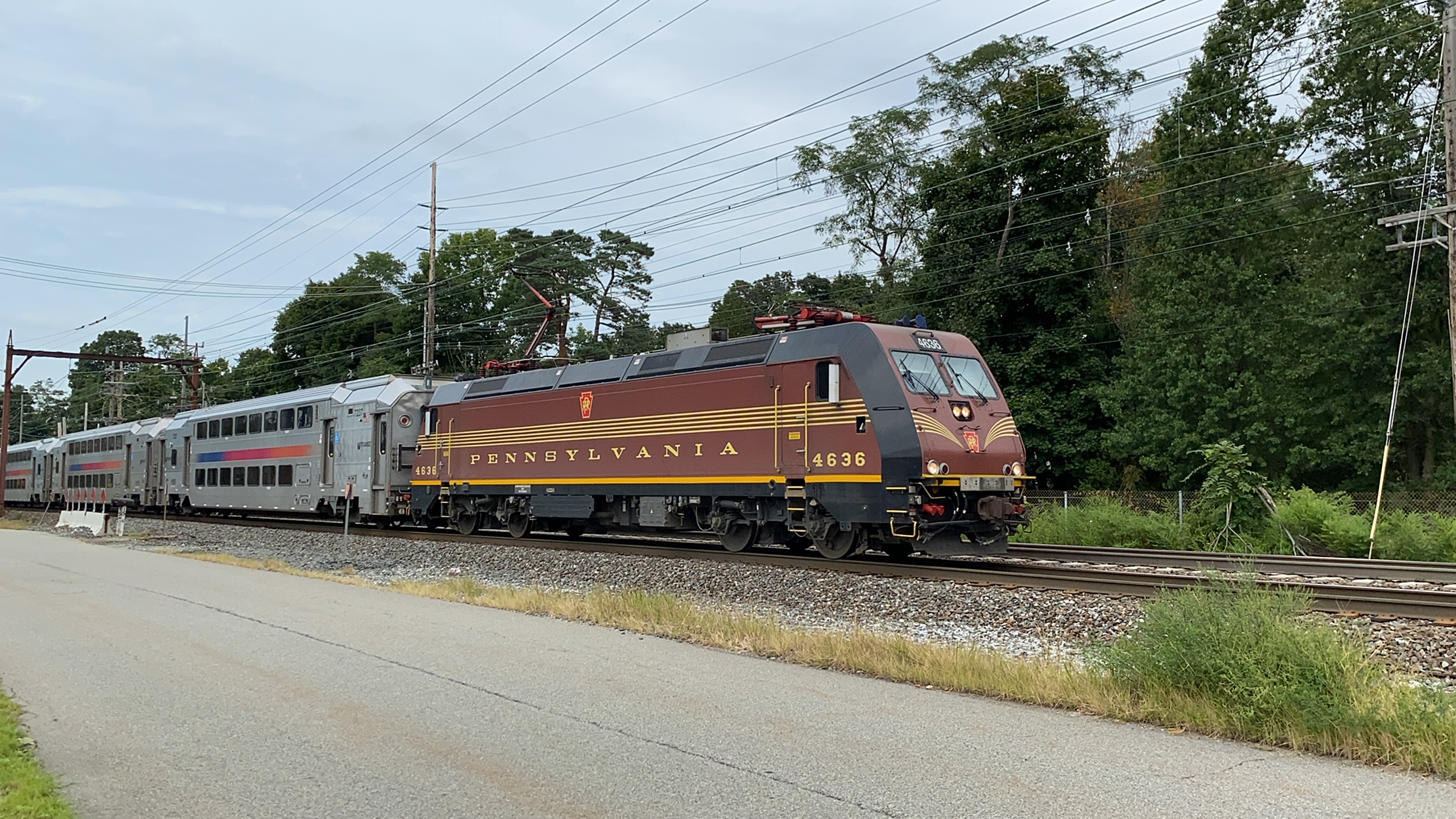
ALP-46A 4636 wearing the PRR heritage scheme

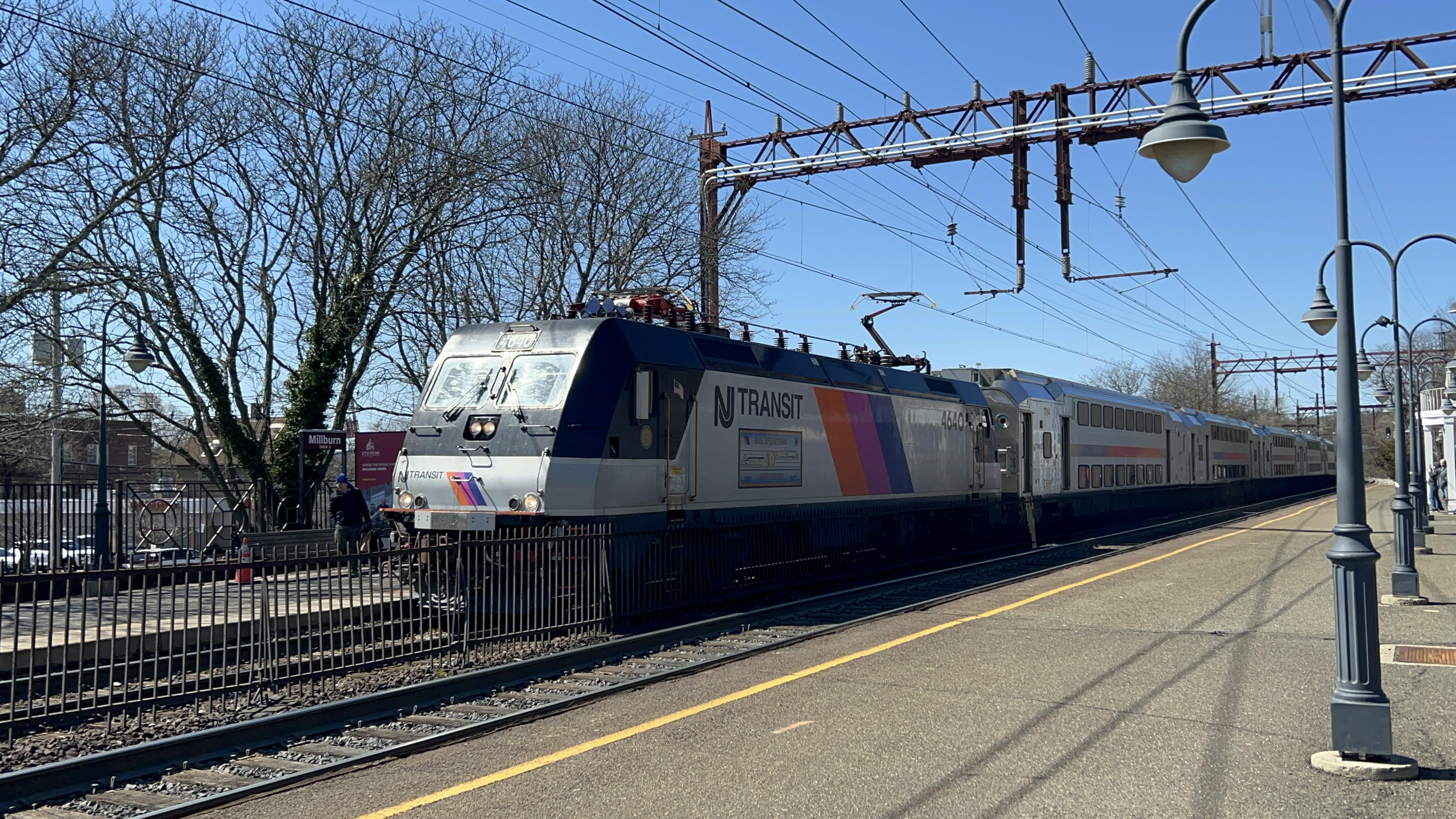
ALP-46A no. 4640, wearing the Disco Stripe heritage scheme

== See also ==
- ALP-45DP
- DB Class 101
