= Lyndhurst Draw =

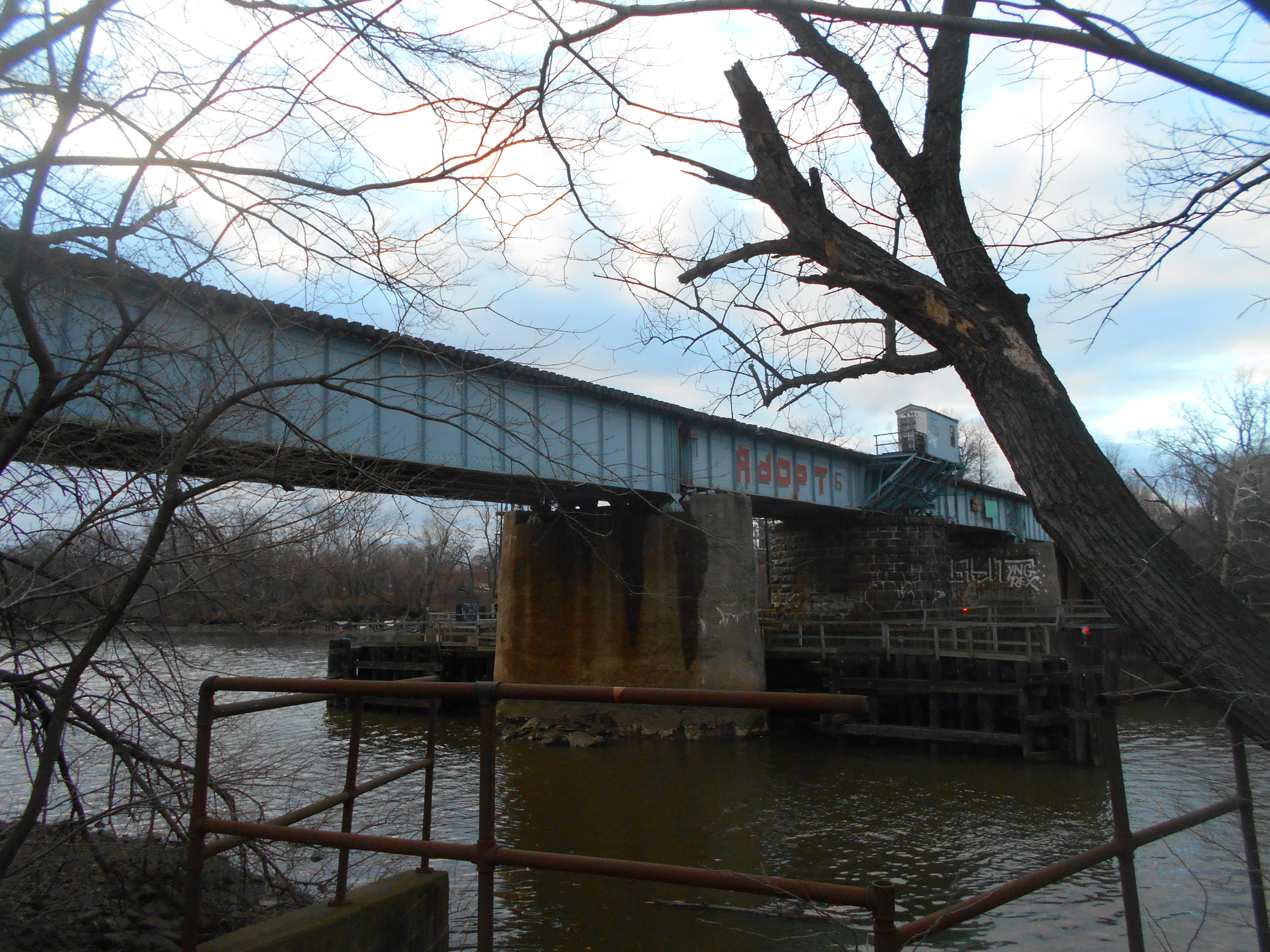
- Lyndhurst Draw as seen from Route 507 in Lyndhurst.
- Coordinates: 40°49′14″N 74°07′36″W
- Crosses: Passaic River
- Locale: Clifton and Lyndhurst, New Jersey
- Owner: New Jersey Transit

Characteristics
- Design: Swing bridge
- Total length: 441 feet (134 m)
- Longest span: 155.8 feet (47.5 m)

Rail characteristics
- No. of tracks: 2

History
- Opened: 1903

Location
- Interactive map of Lyndhurst Draw

The Lyndhurst Draw is a railroad bridge crossing the Passaic River between Clifton and Lyndhurst in northeastern New Jersey. Built in 1903, it is owned and operated by New Jersey Transit Rail Operations (NJT).

The swing bridge is situated between the Lyndhurst and Delawanna stations of NJT's Main Line, 8.52 miles (13.71 km) from its origination point at Hoboken Terminal, and 11.7 miles (18.8 km) from the river's mouth at Newark Bay. Norfolk Southern Railway uses the bridge to access Croxton Yard to the east across the New Jersey Meadowlands. The bridge is required by federal regulations to open on 24-hour notice. It is listed on the New Jersey Register of Historic Places (ID#2950).

The lower 17 miles (27 km) of the ninety-mile (140 km) long Passaic River downstream of the Dundee Dam is tidally influenced and navigable. Rail service across the river was originally oriented to bringing passengers and freight from the points west over the Hackensack Meadows to Bergen Hill, where tunnels and cuts provided access terminals on the Hudson River. The crossing of the river was developed under the auspices of the Delaware, Lackawanna, and Western Railroad (DL&W) as part of its Boonton Branch, which in 1960 merged with the Erie Railroad to form the Erie Lackawanna. In 1963, the Erie's Main Line south of Paterson through downtown Passaic was abandoned and service was shifted to the alignment over the Lyndhurst Draw and the Upper Hack Lift. Operations were later taken over by Conrail under contract with the New Jersey Department of Transportation, and in 1983 by NJT.

== See also ==
- Avondale Bridge (Passaic River)
- List of crossings of the Lower Passaic River
- List of NJT moveable bridges
- Boonton Branch
