= DB Class 101 =

German Bo-Bo electric locomotive

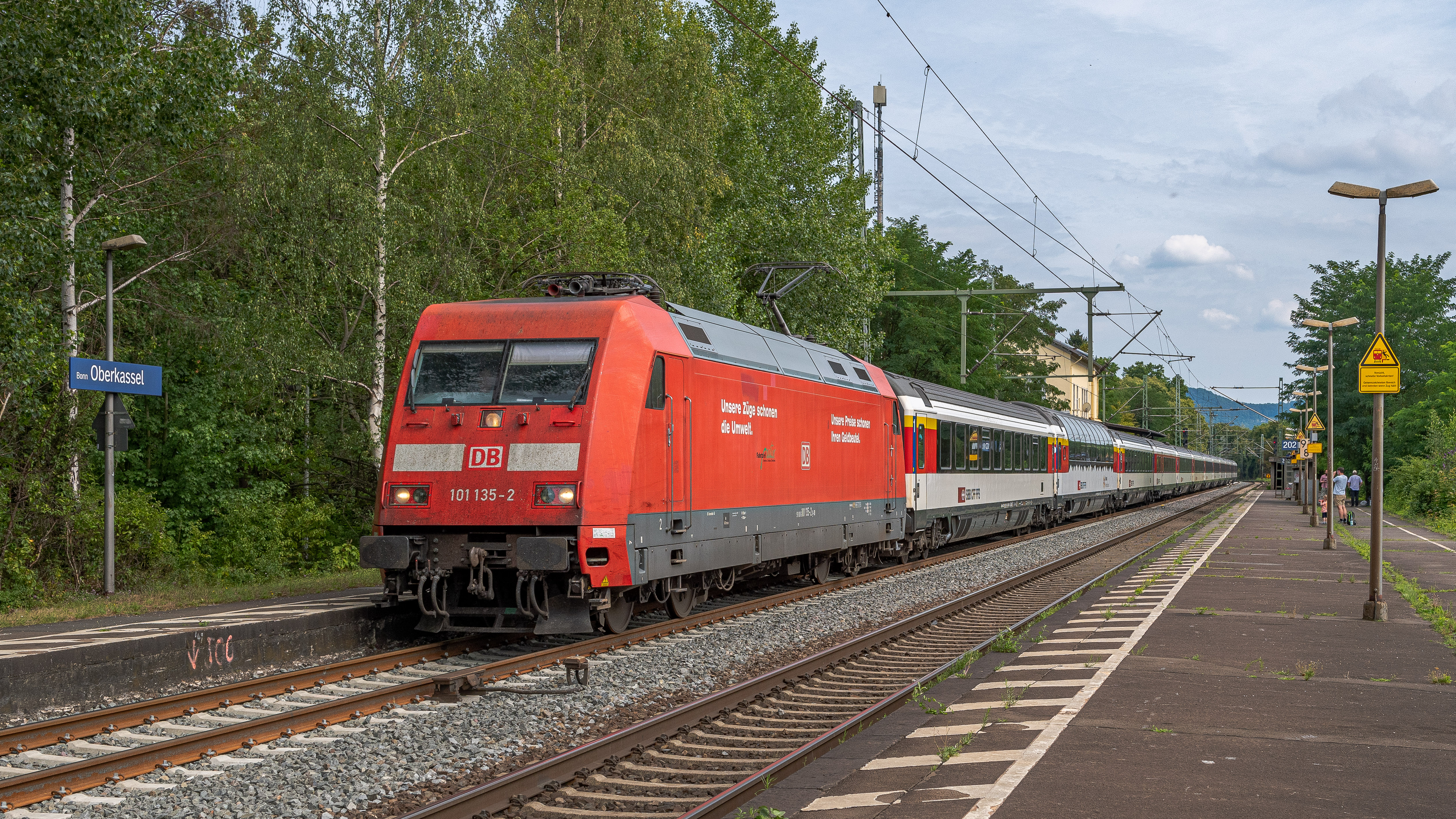
- 101135 passing through Bonn-Oberkassel on a EuroCity service
Type and origin
- Power type: Electric
- Builder: Adtranz
- Model: 101
- Build date: 1996–99, 2002
- Total produced: 145 (1 rebuilt)
Specifications
- Configuration
  - AAR: B-B
  - UIC: Bo′Bo′
- Gauge: 1,435 mm (4 ft 8 1/2 in) standard gauge
- Length: 19,100 mm (62 ft 8 in)
- Loco weight: 83 t (82 long tons; 91 short tons)
- Electric system/s: 15 kV 16.7 Hz AC Catenary
- Current pickup: Pantograph
- Traction motors: 4FIA 7067
- Train brakes: KE-GPR, electric brakes
- Safety systems: Sifa, PZB, LZB, ETCS
Performance figures
- Maximum speed: Service: 200 km/h (125 mph); Design: 220 km/h (137 mph)
- Power output: 6,400 kW (8,583 hp)
- Tractive effort: 300 kN (67,443 lb_{f})

The DB Class 101 is a class of three-phase electric locomotives built by Adtranz and operated by DB Fernverkehr in Germany. 145 locomotives were built between 1996 and 1999 to replace the 30-year-old and aging Class 103 as the flagship of the Deutsche Bahn, primarily hauling Intercity services. As of 2026, this class is currently being retired and scrapped.

In the United States, the Bombardier ALP-46 is derived from the DB Class 101. The Bombardier Traxx shares a common heritage.

== Background ==
101041 at Köln Messe/Deutz in 2015

Following German reunification in 1990, it became apparent that the fleet of electric locomotives serving the InterCity network, the Class 103, were too old and unreliable to serve a newly-unified network. While newer fleets were ordered for the East and West German railways, coming in the form of the Class 112 and 120 respectively, both were ill-suited for InterCity services.

In 1991 the Deutsche Bundesbahn (DB) tendered for 1,000 new universal electric locomotives capable of reaching 200 km/h (120 mph) and operating on both freight and passenger services, designated as the Class 121. However, none of the bids were within DB's budget and the company's expectations were deemed too high as the locomotive would be overengineered for some duties. Following this, the procurement was split into three series of orders, one being a long-distance express passenger locomotive, leading to another tender being launched in December 1993.

Despite some of the German rail manufacturers having working prototypes on the DB network, such as Siemens' Class 127 EuroSprinter and AEG's 12X, in 1995 the tender was awarded to ABB Henschel, which only had demonstrated its technology on two rebuilt Class 120 locomotives, resulting in the order of 145 Class 101 locomotives at the cost of DM 5.6 million (€2.86 million) per loco.

== Construction ==
Taking inspiration from the Class 120's design, the Class 101 featured a single curved front for aerodynamics, giving a modern and streamlined appearance. Components were pressure-sealed when locked and bonded to the bodyshell and the design was kept simple for ease of maintenance, allowing the locomotives to reach a top speed of 220 km/h (137 mph).

ABB Henschel subcontracted much of its components to other companies, the first 62 bodyshells being manufactured at the LEW Hennigsdorf factory and the bogies being supplied by Pafawag in Poland, with final assembly taking place at Kassel. Meanwhile, ABB had merged with AEG to become Adtranz, resulting in the remaining 83 bodyshells being made at the former Linke-Hofmann-Busch factory at Wrocław.

All locomotives had LZB 80 and PZB 90 signalling systems installed when new, with a few test subjects being equipped with early versions of European Train Control System from 2001, alongside push-pull electrical equipment that allowed them to operate with recently-delivered passenger control cars.

101089 in a promotional livery for Cewe

Originally planned to be painted in Orientrot (orient red), the Class 101s were the first to be painted in Deutsche Bahn's new Verkehrsrot (traffic red) livery, which became widespread across the non-InterCity rolling stock. Their slab-sided design provided a suitable canvas for advertising and promotional liveries. As such, they are nicknamed Werbeloks (advert locos) by German rail enthusiasts and nearly all examples of the Class 101 fleet had carried advertising at one point, the first being 101001 advertising the Starlight Express musical play in May 1998.

One locomotive – 101092 – suffered heavy damage in a derailment at Brühl on 6 February 2000, resulting in it being entirely rebuilt, completed in December 2002 at a cost of €1.8 million, around 60% of the cost when it was new four years prior.

== Operation ==
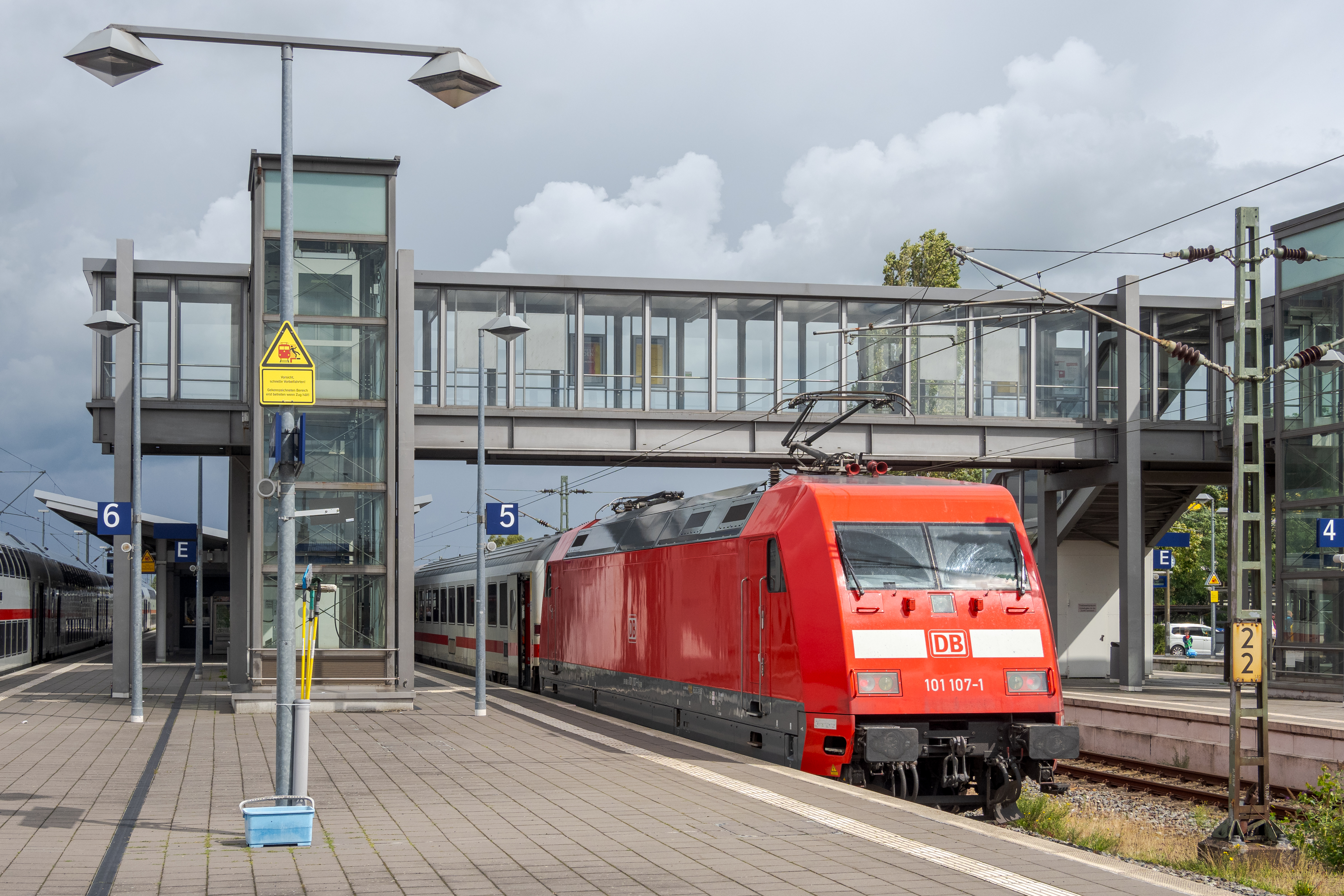
101107 at Emden Hauptbahnhof in 2023

The first Class 101 loco was ceremonially presented to Deutsche Bahn on 1 July 1996 at Kassel, less than two years after the contract was signed. Main line testing followed and approval for use was obtained on 18 February 1997, the first locomotive officially entering passenger service the next day.

Initial workings saw the Class 101 replace Class 111s on InterRegio services between Hamburg and Konstanz. By December 1997, they began taking over EuroCity and InterCity trains from the Class 103 and full deployment of the fleet was completed by June 1999. As such, their presence could be found across the electrified German rail network as well as routinely working inside Austria to Vienna, Klagenfurt and Graz.

Two locomotives – 101130 and 131 – were allocated to the new Metropolitan Express from 1999, operating a first class-only service between Cologne and Hamburg, with them receiving silver liveries. Ultimately the concept was unsuccessful and the service was discontinued in December 2004.

While they were built with express passenger services in mind, the Class 101 had been planned for secondary use on freight trains. In reality this did not happen due to an insufficient rate of new ICE rolling stock to cascade the fleet in addition to reports of bodywork damages when conducting limited trials in 2006.

=== Withdrawals and further use ===
101128 on a RegionalExpress train near Munich in 2018

The introduction of new ICE and IC2 trains, combined with the expansion of the German high speed rail network and the withdrawal of DB's City Night Line sleeper trains in 2016, led to a gradual decline in the class's duties. First withdrawals began in 2020 followed by a further rate throughout 2021. As of September 2026, 80 locomotives have already been scrapped. Cross-border EuroCity trains to Austria and Switzerland were replaced by ICE services in December 2025 and InterCity services to Westerland and Oberstdorf were replaced by ICE L trains in 2026, prompting further withdrawals of the Class 101 fleet.

From 2006, following the opening of the Nuremberg–Ingolstadt high-speed railway, Class 101s began working Regional-Express services between Munich and Nuremberg using former InterCity coaches. They were initially replaced by Class 102 Škodas in 2020 however their unreliability resulted in some Class 101 locos to return. They are expected to be withdrawn from this route by 2028 by new Siemens Desiro HC electric multiple units.

RDC Germany, a subsidiary of Railroad Development Corporation, purchased two Class 101 locos from DB for use on sleeper trains and car transporter shuttles in 2022 later followed by an additional two. Netherlands-based Train Charter Services had also acquired four locos since 2023, utilising them on Ersatzzüge replacement trains and on GoVolta's Amsterdam–Berlin route. The first Class 101 loco (101001) was handed over for preservation at the DB Museum, Koblenz in January 2023 and has been repainted into the Rheingold livery for use on railtours.

== See also ==
- Bombardier ALP-46, a US locomotive based on the Class 101
- Headstock

== Bibliography ==
- Baur, Karl Gerhard Im Führerstand. Baureihe 101. In: LOK MAGAZIN. Nr. 244/Jahrgang 41/2002. GeraNova Zeitschriftenverlag GmbH München, ISSN 0458-1822, S. 60–62.
- Baur, Karl Gerhard (2013). Baureihe 101: Die Intercity-Lokomotive der Deutschen Bahn [Class 101: The InterCity Locomotive of the Deutsche Bahn] (in German). München: GeraMond. ISBN 9783862451883.
- Klee, Wolfgang. Die Hochleistungs-Universal-Loks der BR 101. In: Die Baureihen 101, 145, 152 und 182. Sonderausgabe 1/2001 EisenbahnJournal ISSN 0720-051X, S. 22 -39.
- Fender, Keith (August 2026). "30 Years of DB Class 101". Today's Railways Europe. No. 366. Platform 5.
