= Main Line (NJ Transit) =

Commuter rail line in New Jersey

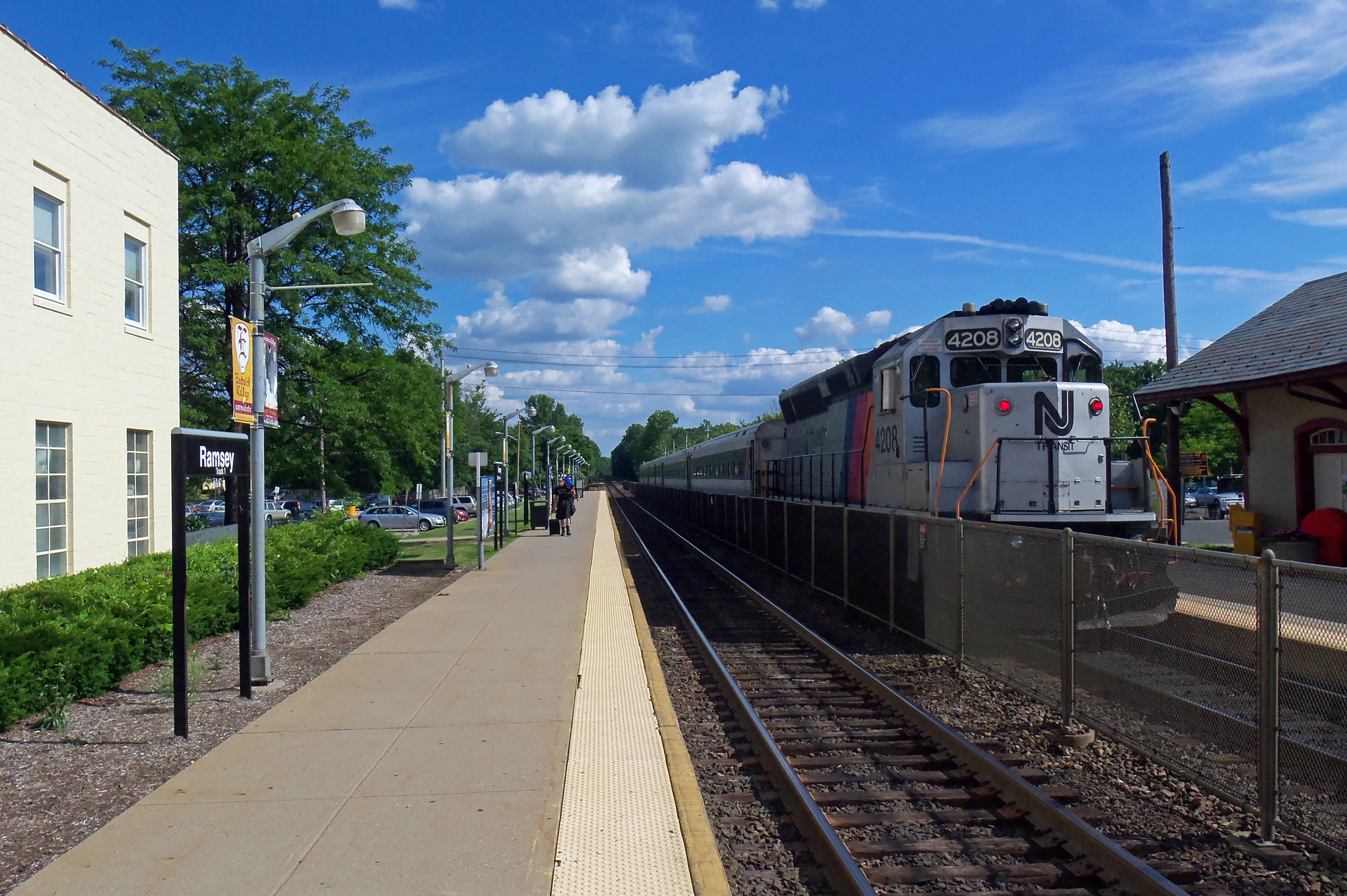
- A Main Line train led by a GP40PH-2B at Ramsey.

Overview
- Owner: NJ Transit Rail Operations
- Locale: Northern New Jersey and Hudson Valley, New York, United States
- Termini: Hoboken Terminal; Suffern
- Stations: 17

Service
- Type: Commuter rail
- System: New Jersey Transit Rail Operations; Metro-North Railroad
- Operator: NJ Transit Rail Operations
- Rolling stock: F40PH-3C/GP40PH-2/ALP-45DP/PL42AC locomotives Comet V/Multilevel coaches
- Daily ridership: 17,300 (Q1, FY 2025) (Note: Includes ridership from Bergen County Line)

Technical
- Line length: 95 mi (153 km)
- Track gauge: 4 ft 8 1/2 in (1,435 mm) standard gauge

The Main Line (or Erie Main Line) is a commuter rail line owned and operated by New Jersey Transit running from Suffern, New York to Hoboken, New Jersey, in the United States. It runs daily commuter service and was once the north–south main line of the Erie Railroad. It is colored yellow on NJ Transit system maps, and its symbol is a water wheel.

The Bergen County Line splits off the Main Line just west of the Secaucus Junction transfer station and rejoins it at Ridgewood. Trains on both lines are push-pull, powered by diesel locomotives (ordinarily on the west end of the train). These include not only the GP40PH-2s, F40PH locos, GP40FH-2s, and PL42AC locos but it also includes the dual mode ALP-45DP locomotives too, and consists range from Comet V cars to Multilevel Coaches while some trains may also use Comet IIM or IV cars on rare occasions.

== History ==
The Erie Railroad's main line ran from Jersey City to Chicago via Binghamton and Jamestown, New York, Akron and Marion, Ohio, and Huntington, Indiana, with branches to Buffalo, Cleveland, and Dayton. The section in New Jersey and lower New York State saw frequent commuter service to the waterfront Pavonia Terminal, Jersey City, with connections to the Pavonia Ferry to Lower Manhattan.

The Erie Railroad's major long-distance passenger trains to Chicago, the Atlantic Express and Pacific Express, the Erie Limited, and the Lake Cities, ran along this section, through Passaic, Paterson, Ridgewood, on to Port Jervis, northwest to Binghamton, New York State's Southern Tier, Jamestown, and west to Chicago. The final long-distance train along this route was the Atlantic Express and Pacific Express in 1965.

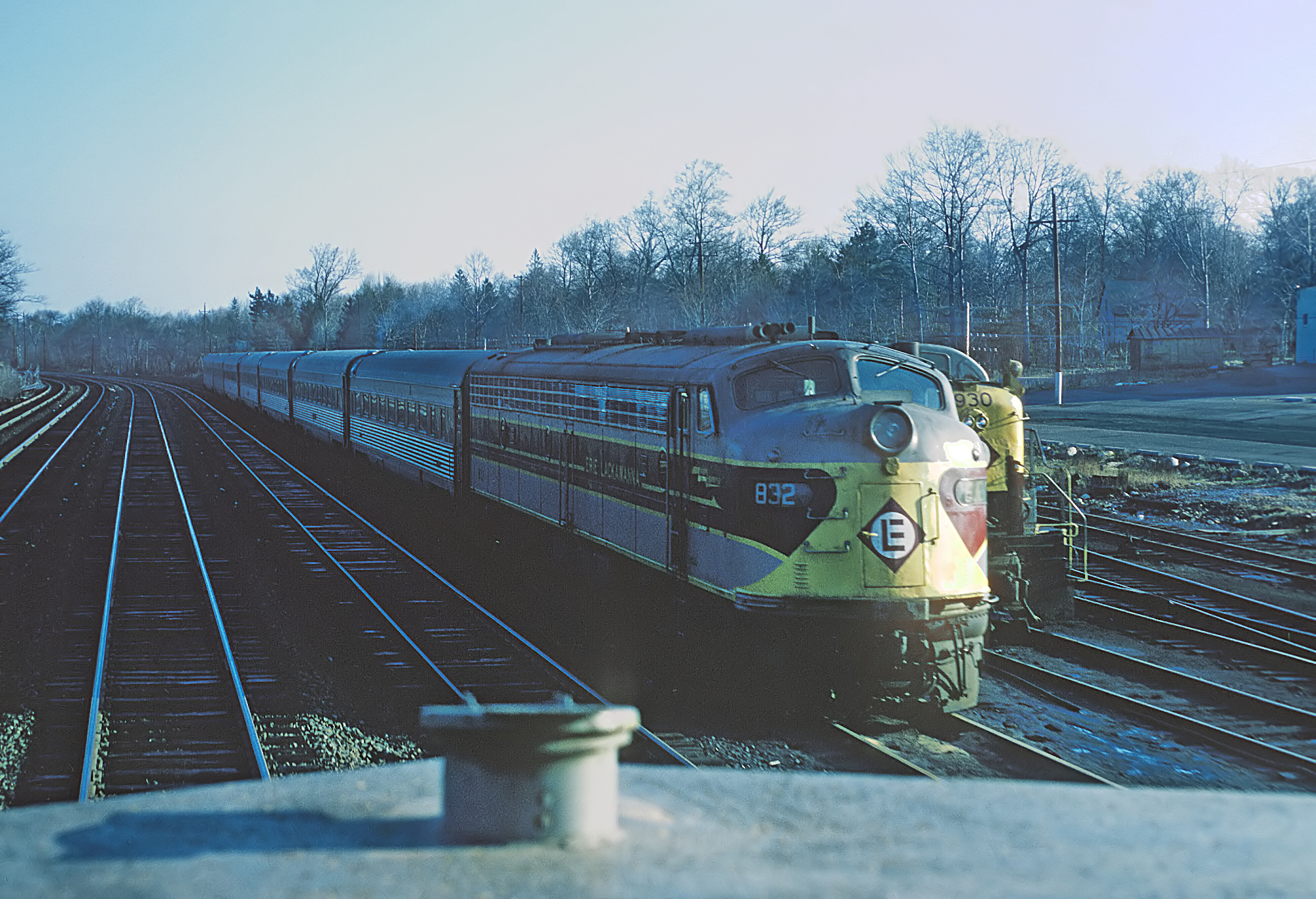
Trains at the Erie Lackawanna rail yard in Waldwick on April 25, 1970

In 1963, the Erie Main Line south of Paterson to its connection with the Bergen County Line south of Carlton Hill in Rutherford was abandoned and service began using the former Lackawanna Boonton Branch south of Paterson via the Lyndhurst Draw and Upper Hack Lift bridges as the route through downtown Passaic was abandoned. Nominal Boonton Line service began using the Erie's Greenwood Lake division up to its junction with the Lackawanna Boonton Branch at Mountain View in Wayne as the Lackawanna right-of-way in Paterson was used for the construction of Interstate 80 and New Jersey State Highway 19. The Erie Jersey City terminal was abandoned circa 1959 after all Erie service had moved to the Lackawanna Hoboken Terminal.

Service under Erie Lackawanna introduced new GE U34CH diesels and Comet I cars in 1970 which lasted under NJ DOT and Conrail into the NJ Transit era. Metro-North took over service north of Suffern in 1983. Effective April 18, 1983, Metro-North Railroad shifted its Port Jervis Line service to run on the Graham Line freight bypass, thus ending the direct passenger route from Harriman through Monroe and Goshen to Middletown. Service was increased along with the opening of the Secaucus Junction station in late 2003.

=== 1996 Secaucus collision ===
On February 9, 1996, a Main Line train was involved in a collision with a Bergen County Line train in Secaucus.

== Description ==
Departing the historic 1907-built Hoboken Terminal, the yards for the coaches to the left, trains pass over two city streets and the Hudson Bergen Light Rail before entering the Bergen Tunnels under the Bergen Hill section of Hudson Palisades. Midway through the tunnel there are air shafts allowing light through and venting out the diesel fumes. Exiting the tunnel, the train curves right onto the Main Line at West End interlocking in Jersey City. Until 1963 this was the DL&W Boonton Branch; about a mile ahead was the connection built circa 1956 with the Erie main line (that after 1963 became the Bergen County Line). Two trains collided head-on here in 1996, killing two engineers and a passenger. The ramps for New Jersey Turnpike Interchange 15X now occupy the Erie alignment—since the Bergen County line was rerouted adjacent to the Main Line to pass through Secaucus Junction.

At Secaucus Junction, all trains stop for passengers to change to and from Northeast Corridor Line, North Jersey Coast Line, Raritan Valley Line and Midtown Direct trains on the Morristown Line, the Gladstone Branch, and the Montclair–Boonton Line on the upper level.

The Main Line then runs through an industrial section of Secaucus. Shortly afterwards the Bergen County Line curves right on its new connection to the Erie alignment. The Main Line then crosses over the Hackensack River on the single-track Upper Hack Lift bridge, built in 1958.

Double track resumes under the New Jersey Turnpike's western spur after 0.4 mile of single track. The train continues through the Meadowlands and passes the first grade crossing at Valley Brook Avenue in Lyndhurst. The line curves slightly and passes through the 1903 Kingsland tunnel. The former Kingsland station is shortly after the tunnel in an open cut followed by the Lyndhurst station, on an embankment.

After Lyndhurst the train crosses the Passaic River via the Lyndhurst Draw that has been bolted shut (although it is technically required by Federal regulation to be opened on 24 hours notice). The train enters Clifton as it crosses over Route 21 and then passes under Route 3 before it approaches Delawanna station.

Next stop is Passaic, on an embankment. After Passaic, the Main Line has a stretch through some industrial areas before the Clifton station, also on an embankment.

The Main Line passes under U.S. Route 46 and the Garden State Parkway before it crosses under and over several streets in south Paterson. It leaves the DL&W Boonton Branch alignment at about 40.886°N 74.167°W and reaches the Erie Main Line alignment at 40.905°N 74.164°W. This connection was single track when built circa 1963, then double-tracked in a rehabilitation project in 2002. The line passes under Interstate 80 and heads into downtown Paterson. The Erie station in Paterson is elevated, with a center platform.

Continuing north the Main Line is elevated through Paterson, passing over streets. After several grade crossings in an industrial area, the tracks cross the Passaic River on a truss bridge. Hawthorne is the next stop, at grade level. After a long stretch, the train reaches Glen Rock station, at grade level at a crossing.

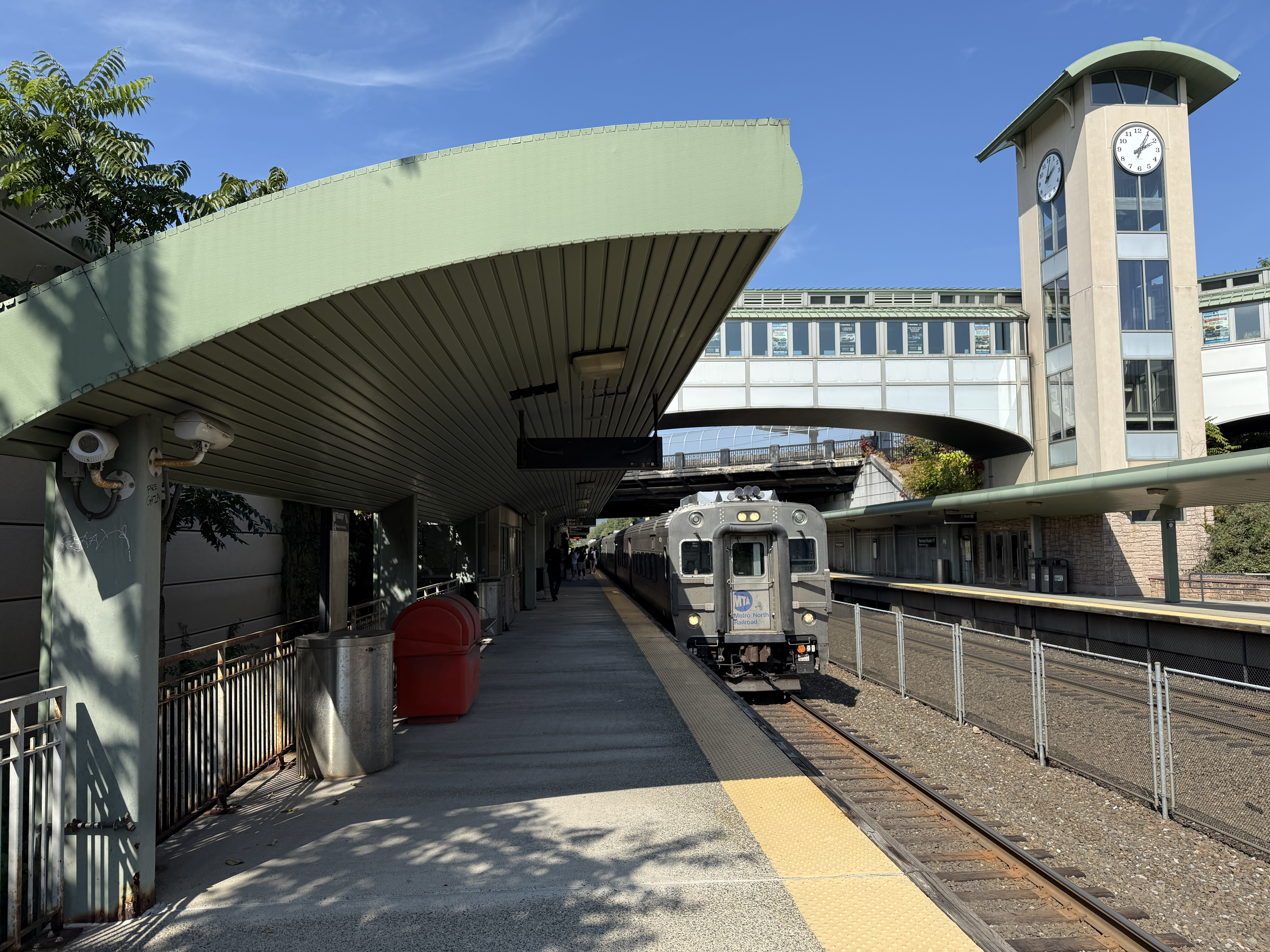
An inbound Main Line train bound for Hoboken stops at the Ramsey Route 17 station

After Glen Rock the Main Line merges with the Bergen County Line at Ridgewood Junction. The line widens to three tracks (in Erie days the line was four tracks from here to Suffern NY). Ridgewood station is next, with Spanish-style design on the station building and with newly constructed high-level platforms.

Next is Ho-Ho-Kus, also at grade. Waldwick follows with an abandoned station building on the northbound side and a footbridge connecting the two platforms. Waldwick Yard is just north of the station with the restored WC tower on the southbound side by the yard. Just following Waldwick Yard is a grade crossing. North of the grade crossing (which has three tracks) the line becomes two tracks.

Allendale and Ramsey follow, both as grade-level stations. Ramsey-Route 17 station (opened August 22, 2004) is next. It is a park-and-ride facility located off of Route 17 south in Ramsey.

Mahwah follows and is the last station in New Jersey. Crossing over the New York state line the train arrives at Suffern, the last stop for NJT Main Line trains.

== Stations ==
State	Zone	Location	Station	Milepost (km)	Date opened	Date closed	Line services			Connections
State	Zone	Location	Station	Milepost (km)	Date opened	Date closed	BC	ML	PJ	Connections
NJ	1	Hoboken	Hoboken Terminal	0.0 (0.0)	1903		●	●	●	NJ Transit Rail: Bergen County, Gladstone, Meadowlands, Montclair–Boonton, Morristown, North Jersey Coast, Pascack Valley, and Raritan Valley Lines; Hudson-Bergen Light Rail: 8th Street-Hoboken, Hoboken-Tonnelle lines PATH: HOB-WTC, HOB-33, JSQ-33 (via HOB); NJ Transit Bus: 22, 23, 63, 64, 68, 85, 87, 89, 126; New York Waterway to Battery Park City
NJ	1	Secaucus	Secaucus Junction	3.5 (5.6)	December 15, 2003		●	●	●	NJ Transit Rail (upper level): Gladstone, Montclair–Boonton, Morristown, Northeast Corridor, North Jersey Coast, and Raritan Valley lines NJ Transit Rail (lower level): Bergen County, Meadowlands, and Pascack Valley lines NJ Transit Bus: 2, 78, 129, 329, 353
NJ	2	Lyndhurst	Kingsland	7.6 (12.2)	December 14, 1870	June 8, 2025		●		NJ Transit Bus: 76
NJ	2	Lyndhurst	Lyndhurst	8.2 (13.2)	December 14, 1870			●		
NJ	3	Clifton	Delawanna	9.3 (15.0)	December 14, 1870			●		NJ Transit Bus: 27, 74, 190
NJ	4	Passaic	Passaic	10.6 (17.1)	December 14, 1870			●		NJ Transit Bus: 190, 702
NJ	5	Clifton	Clifton	12.2 (19.6)	December 14, 1870			●		NJ Transit Bus: 705, 707
NJ	6	Paterson	South Paterson		Exact date unknown; 1870's	1986				
NJ	6	Paterson	Paterson	15.6 (25.1)	May 28, 1832			●		NJ Transit Bus: 161, 703, 707, 712, 744, 746, 748
NJ	6	Paterson	River Street		1883	1977				
NJ	7	Hawthorne	Hawthorne	17.7 (28.5)	October 19, 1848			●		NJ Transit Bus: 722
NJ	8	Glen Rock	Ferndale		1894	1920s		●		
NJ	8	Glen Rock	Glen Rock–Main Line	19.4 (31.2)	October 19, 1848			●		
NJ	9	Ridgewood	Ridgewood	20.9 (33.6)	October 19, 1848		●	●		NJ Transit Bus: 163, 164, 175, 722, 746, 752
NJ	10	Ho-Ho-Kus	Ho-Ho-Kus	22.1 (35.6)	October 19, 1848		●	●		
NJ	10	Waldwick	Waldwick	23.2 (37.3)	1886		●	●		
NJ	11	Allendale	Allendale	24.6 (39.6)	October 19, 1848		●	●		
NJ	12	Ramsey	Ramsey	26.5 (42.6)	October 19, 1848		●	●		
NJ	13	Ramsey	Ramsey Route 17	27.9 (44.9)	August 22, 2004		●	●	●	
NJ	14	Mahwah	Mahwah	29.1 (46.8)	October 19, 1848		●	●	●	Short Line Bus: 17
NY	14	Suffern	Suffern	30.5 (49.1)	June 30, 1841		●	●	●	Transport of Rockland: 59, 93, Monsey Loop 3, Hudson Link; Short Line Bus: 17M/MD/SF

== Bibliography ==
- Green, Frank Bertangue (1886). The History of Rockland County. New York, New York: A.S. Barnes.
- Lyon, Isaac S. (1873). Historical Discourse on Boonton, Delivered Before the Citizens of Boonton at Washington Hall, on the Evenings of September 21 and 28, and October 5, 1867. Newark, New Jersey: The Daily Journal Office.
- Mott, Edward Harold (1899). Between the Ocean and the Lakes: The Story of Erie. New York, New York: John S. Collins.
- Ridgewood, Bergen County, New Jersey, Past and Present. Ridgewood, New Jersey: Citizens Semi-Centennial Association. December 1916.
- Wardell, Patricia Webb (1994). Allendale: Background of a Borough. Allendale, New Jersey: Allendale Historical Society. Archived from the original on August 16, 2017.
- Van Valen, James M. (1900). History of Bergen County, New Jersey. New York, New York: New Jersey Publishing and Engraving Company.
- Yanosey, Robert J. (2007). Lackawanna Railroad Facilities (In Color). Vol. 1: Hoboken to Dover. Scotch Plains, New Jersey: Morning Sun Books Inc. ISBN 978-1-58248-214-9.
