= NJ Transit Rail Operations =

Commuter rail division of NJ Transit

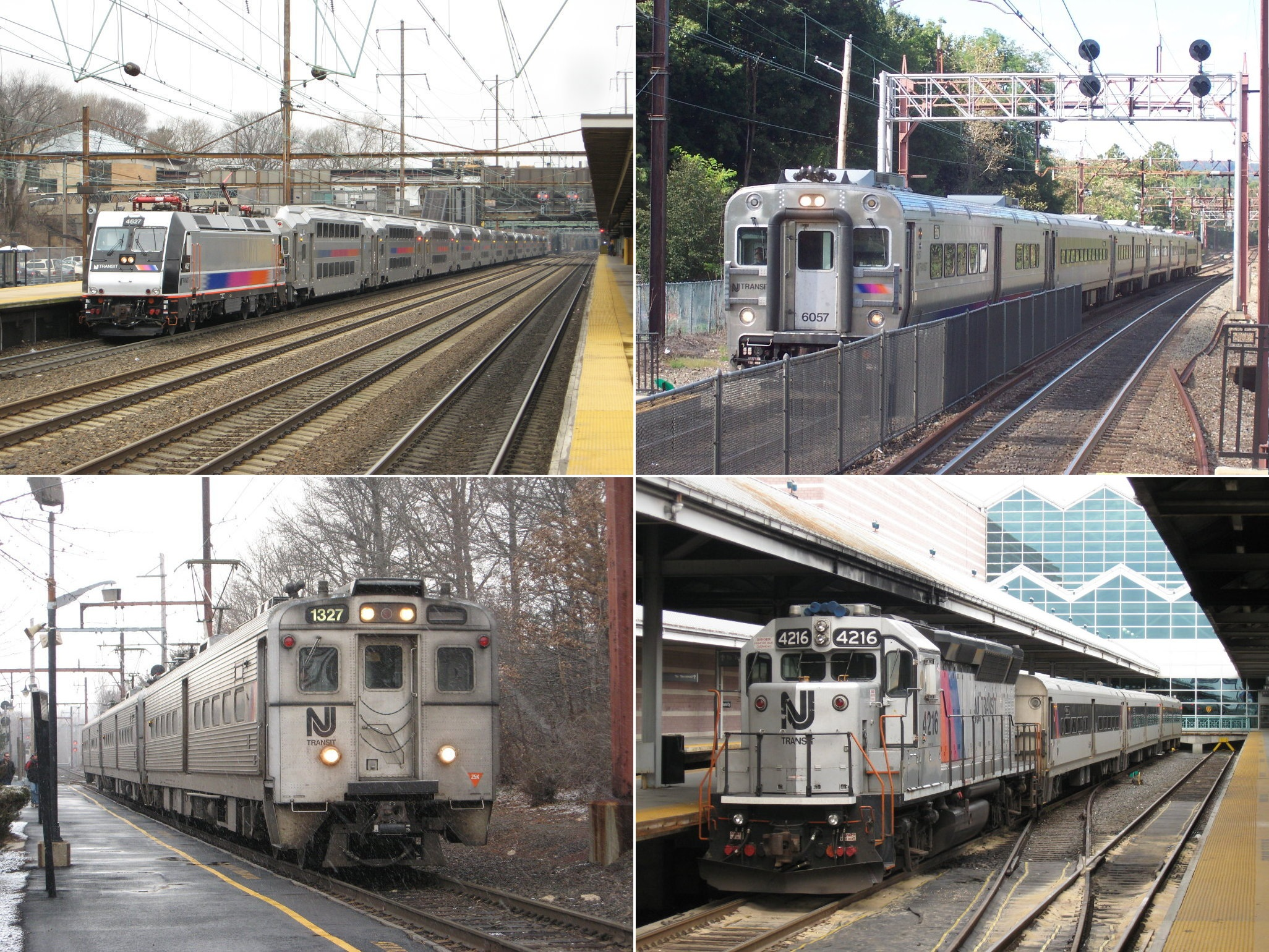
- NJ Transit provides rail service throughout North Jersey & Central Jersey, while only 1 line provides service between Philadelphia and Atlantic City in South Jersey, and in the lower Hudson Valley west of the Hudson River.

Overview
- Headquarters: 1 Penn Plaza East; Newark, New Jersey, U.S.
- Reporting mark: NJTR
- Locale: North Jersey, Central Jersey, White Horse Pike corridor, Hudson Valley
- Dates of operation: 1983–present

Technical
- Track gauge: 4 ft 8 1/2 in (1,435 mm) standard gauge
- Electrification: Overhead line; 25 kV 60 Hz AC; 12 kV 25 Hz AC
Route map
Key

NJ Transit Rail Operations (reporting mark NJTR) is the rail division of NJ Transit. It operates commuter rail service in New Jersey, with most service centered on transportation to and from New York City, Hoboken, and Newark. NJ Transit also operates rail service in Orange and Rockland counties in New York under contract to Metro-North Railroad. The commuter rail lines saw 62,029,400 riders in 2025, making it the third-busiest commuter railroad in North America and the longest commuter rail system in North America by route length.

== History ==
=== 19th century ===
The lines operated by NJ Transit were formerly operated by the Pennsylvania Railroad, Central Railroad of New Jersey, New York and Long Branch Railroad, and Erie Lackawanna Railroad, most of which date from the mid-19th century.

=== 20th century ===
In the 1960s, the New Jersey Department of Transportation began funding the commuter lines.

By 1976, the lines were all operated by Conrail under contract to NJDOT. NJDOT began rehabilitating the electrification systems on the current day Hoboken Division; this involved converting the system from 3 kV DC to 25 kV 60 Hz AC. Furthermore, Arrow III cars were ordered to replace the aging fleet of MUs inherited from the Erie Lackawanna Railroad.

Following the Northeast Rail Service Act of 1981 which required Conrail to abandon or transfer its commuter rail services to state agencies, NJ Transit Rail Operations took control of on January 1, 1983.

In 1984, the aforementioned rehabilitation project was finally completed. The Erie Lackawanna MUs were retired after their final run on August 23, 1984 and were replaced with Arrow IIIs.

In 1988, electrification was extended from Matawan to Long Branch on the North Jersey Coast Line.

NJ Transit greatly expanded and consolidated its rail system in the 1990s and early 2000s.

On September 9, 1991, the Waterfront Connection opened allowing diesel trains running on the Pennsylvania Railroad mainline to access Hoboken Terminal. Complementing the Waterfront Connection, the Kearny Connection, which is electrified, opened on June 10, 1996 allowing M&E trains to access New York Penn Station. NJ Transit christened the new service as the Midtown Direct.

=== 21st century ===
On September 30, 2002, the Montclair Connection opened, which connects the former end of the Montclair Branch to the old Boonton Line. This consolidated the Montclair Branch and Boonton Line operations; the new consolidated service was named the Montclair Boonton Line. Following this change, some trains were rerouted to terminate at Penn Station along with the opening of a yard at Great Notch.

Secaucus Junction was opened on December 15, 2003, connecting the two commuter networks in northern New Jersey for the first time. This allowed commuters on trains bound for Hoboken to transfer to New York Penn Station bound trains, thus saving commuters an estimated 15 minutes transferring to PATH trains at Hoboken.

NJ Transit took over Clocker (NY-Philadelphia) service from Amtrak on October 31, 2005. While four trains were added to the schedule, service was cut back from Philadelphia to Trenton.

On September 29, 2016, Pascack Valley Line train #1614 overran the end of the platform track in Hoboken Terminal and went into the concourse, coming to rest just before the waiting room wall. Both the terminal and the cab car sustained major structural damage.

On December 19, 2025, there was a head on collision between two trains along the Montclair-Boonton Line west of Bay Street station resulting in 17 injuries.

In 2025, beginning on May 16 and ending on May 18, all train operations temporarily ceased due to a strike by the Brotherhood of Locomotive Engineers and Trainmen.

In April 2026, NJ Transit received the first of more than 300 new Bombardier MultiLevel railcars, which will replace the older Arrows that have frequently caused delays due to mechanical failures and limited equipment availability.

== Network and infrastructure ==
The system took its current form in 1983, when NJ Transit took over all commuter service in New Jersey. NJ Transit Rail Operations is divided into the Hoboken Division and the Newark Division. The two networks were not integrated until the opening of Secaucus Junction in 2003, which enabled passengers to transfer between lines bound for New York and Hoboken.

=== Lines ===
As of 2024, NJ Transit's commuter rail network consists of 12 lines and 166 stations, primarily concentrated in northern & central New Jersey, with one line running in South Jersey between Atlantic City and Philadelphia.

==== Current lines ====
Operations are in two divisions:

- Hoboken Division, formerly operated by the Erie Lackawanna Railroad, runs from Hoboken Terminal through Newark Broad Street or the lower level of Secaucus Junction to points north and west. Midtown Direct service operates on the Morris & Essex and Montclair-Boonton lines to New York via the Kearny Connection. Most station platforms are low-level. Diesel trains consist of Comet V or MultiLevel coaches pushed/pulled by GP40/F40, PL42AC, or ALP-45DP locomotives, and electric trains use Arrow III EMUs. Midtown Direct trains consist of either Comet IIM/IV cars (with a Comet V cab) or MultiLevel Coaches pushed/pulled by an ALP-45DP or ALP-46.
- Newark Division, formerly operated by the Pennsylvania Railroad, Central Railroad of New Jersey and New York and Long Branch Railroad, operates through Newark Penn Station via Amtrak's Northeast Corridor, with most trains continuing to New York Penn Station. This division also includes the Atlantic City Line formerly operated by the Pennsylvania-Reading Seashore Lines. Most station platforms are high-level. Trains usually consist of either Comet IIM/IV cars (with a Comet V cab) or MultiLevel Coaches pushed/pulled by an ALP-45DP or ALP-46, except for the Atlantic City Line which primarily uses GP40s. All Princeton Branch and some weekday NEC/NJCL trains use Arrow III EMUs.

Newark Division
Lines	Terminals	
Northeast Corridor Line	New York Penn Station	Trenton; Jersey Avenue (some peak weekday trains)
North Jersey Coast Line	New York Penn Station	Long Branch (electric service) South Amboy (some peak weekday trains); Bay Head (diesel service to/from Long Branch, some weekday trains to/from New York)
Raritan Valley Line	Newark Penn Station (most trains); New York Penn Station (limited weekday off-peak trains)	Raritan (most trains); High Bridge (limited weekday trains)
Princeton Branch	Princeton Junction	Princeton
Atlantic City Line	Philadelphia 30th Street Station	Atlantic City

Hoboken Division
Lines	Terminals	
Main Line	Hoboken Terminal	Suffern
Bergen County Line	Hoboken Terminal	Suffern (weekday service); Waldwick (weekend service)
Pascack Valley Line	Hoboken Terminal	Spring Valley
Port Jervis Line (operated under contract with Metro-North Railroad)	Hoboken Terminal	Port Jervis
Meadowlands Rail Line (special occasions only)	Secaucus Junction; Hoboken Terminal (limited service)	Meadowlands
Montclair-Boonton Line	Hoboken Terminal; New York Penn Station	Montclair State University (weekday electric service); Hackettstown (limited weekday diesel service to/from Hoboken only); Bay Street (weekend service)
Morristown Line	Hoboken Terminal; New York Penn Station	Dover (electric service) Summit (some peak weekday trains); Hackettstown (limited weekday diesel service to/from Hoboken only)
Gladstone Branch	Hoboken Terminal; New York Penn Station	Gladstone (to/from Hoboken weekdays, to/from Summit weekends)

==== Freight usage ====
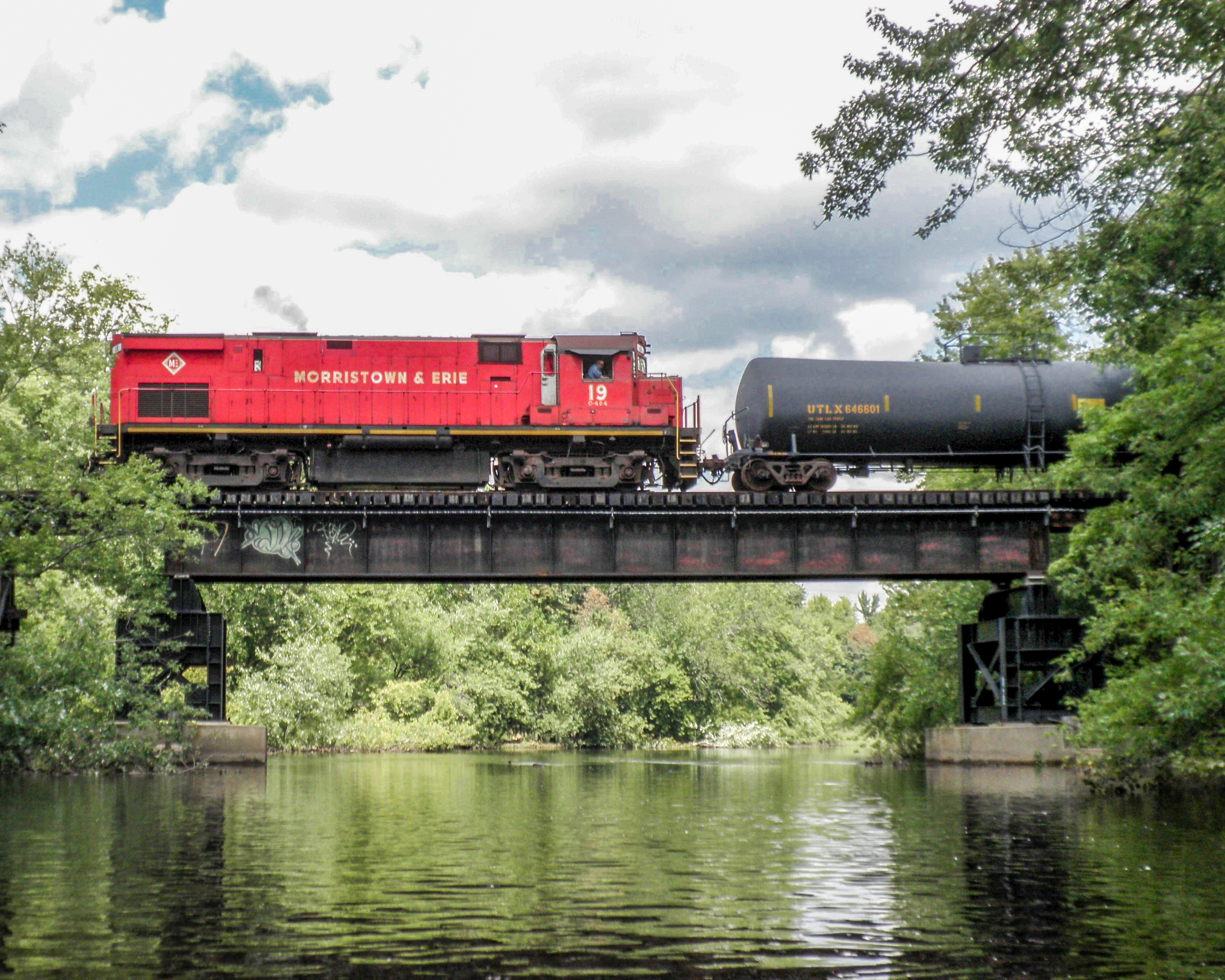
Morristown and Erie Railroad, one of the freight operators authorized to operate on the NJ Transit system, crossing the Passaic River in Roseland

Although NJ Transit itself does not carry freight, NJTR allows freight service to be operated over its lines via trackage rights agreements with several railroads. Conrail Shared Assets Operations (CSAO), CSX, Norfolk Southern (NS) and several short lines (Cape May Seashore Lines (CMSL), Dover and Delaware River Railroad (DD), Morristown & Erie Railway (M&E), and Southern Railroad of New Jersey (SRNJ) currently have trackage rights contracts to operate freight service on NJ Transit lines. The Morristown & Erie Railway can only use NJT trackage to get between its owned trackage; it cannot serve customers on NJ Transit trackage. A similar situation exists for Conrail on the Atlantic City Line.

Below is a list of NJ Transit lines and freight lines that operate on them:

- Morristown Line: DD, M&E
- Montclair-Boonton Line: DD, M&E
- Main Line: NS, M&E
- Bergen County Line: NS, M&E
- Pascack Valley Line: NS
- Raritan Valley Line: CSAO
- North Jersey Coast Line: CSAO
- Atlantic City Line: CSAO, SRNJ

==== Non-passenger lines ====
NJTR also owns several lines not used for regular passenger service. These lines were purchased by the New Jersey Department of Transportation in the late 1970s for railbanking purposes, with ownership transferring to NJ Transit upon its creation in 1979. These lines are either leased for freight/tourist service, interim rail trail use, or remain derelict:

- Harrison-Kingsland Branch: derelict
- Raritan Valley Line:
  - High Bridge-Bloomsbury: NS
  - Bloomsbury-Phillipsburg: trackage removed due to construction of Interstate 78 in 1989
- Red Bank -South Lakewood: Conrail Shared Assets Operations (CSAO), Delaware and Raritan River Railroad
- Woodmansie-Winslow Junction: derelict
- Beesley's Point Secondary:
  - Winslow Junction-Palermo/Beesley's Point: CSAO, Cape May Seashore Lines
  - Palermo-Ocean City: leased to city of Ocean City in 1999 for use as interim Ocean City Bike Path rail trail
- Tuckahoe-Cape May: Cape May Seashore Lines
- HX Interlocking (Hackensack River)-Croxton Yard: realigned for Secaucus Junction, used as yard lead by NS
- Freehold-Farmingdale: derelict
- Freehold-Matawan: leased to Monmouth County Park System until 2020 as interim section of Henry Hudson Trail

=== Ownership ===
NJT owns most of its tracks, infrastructure, bridges, tunnels and signals. The exceptions are:

- Atlantic City Line – Philadelphia 30th Street Station to Frankford Junction (owned by Amtrak) and Frankford Junction to Pennsauken Delair Junction (owned by Conrail)
- Northeast Corridor Line – entire line except Morrisville Yard (owned by Amtrak)
- Port Jervis Line – Suffern to Port Jervis (owned by Norfolk Southern and leased by Metro-North)
- Raritan Valley Line – Aldene to Hunter (owned by Conrail)

=== Yards and maintenance ===
NJ Transit's main storage and maintenance facility is the Meadows Maintenance Complex in Kearny, New Jersey. Other major yard facilities are located at Hoboken Terminal. Amtrak's Sunnyside Yard in Queens, New York serves as a layover facility for trains to New York Penn Station. Additional yards are located at outlying points along the lines. These include:

- Main and Bergen County Lines:
  - Waldwick Yard
  - Suffern Yard
- Montclair-Boonton Line:
  - Great Notch Yard, Little Falls
- Morris and Essex Lines:
  - Gladstone Yard
  - Summit Yard
  - Dover Yard
  - Port Morris Yard
- North Jersey Coast Line:
  - Long Branch Yard
  - Bay Head Yard
- Northeast Corridor:
  - Morrisville Yard, Morrisville, PA (near the Trenton Transit Center)
  - County Yard, New Brunswick (near Jersey Avenue)
  - Hudson Yard, Harrison (Serves mostly Raritan Valley Line trains)
- Pascack Valley Line:
  - Woodbine Yard, Spring Valley, NY
- Port Jervis Line:
  - Port Jervis Yard, Port Jervis, NY
- Raritan Valley Line:
  - Raritan Yard
  - Hudson Yard, Harrison (Shared with Northeast Corridor)

NJT has a fleet of maintenance crews and vehicles that repair tracks, spread ballast, deliver supplies and inspect infrastructure. There are eight non-revenue work diesels used for these purposes.

=== Movable bridges ===
NJT utilizes numerous moveable bridges:

- Dock Bridge, Newark (Passaic River) – Northeast Corridor Line (vertical lift) (owned and operated by Amtrak)
- Portal Bridge, Secaucus (Hackensack River) – Northeast Corridor Line (swing) (owned and operated by Amtrak)
  - Portal North Bridge is a replacement adjacent to original Portal Bridge
- Newark Draw, Newark (Passaic River) – Morristown Line (swing)
- Lower Hack Lift, Jersey City (Hackensack River) – Morristown Line (vertical lift)
- Upper Hack Lift, Secaucus (Hackensack River) – Main Line (vertical lift)
- HX Draw, Secaucus (Hackensack River) – Bergen County Line and Pascack Valley Line (bascule)
- Lyndhurst Draw, Lyndhurst (Passaic River) – Main Line (swing)
- River Draw, South Amboy (Raritan River) – North Jersey Coast Line (swing)
- Morgan Draw, Old Bridge (Cheesequake Creek) – North Jersey Coast Line (bascule)
- Oceanport Draw, Oceanport (Oceanport Creek) – North Jersey Coast Line (swing)
- Shark River Draw, Belmar (Shark River) – North Jersey Coast Line (bascule)
- Brielle Draw, Brielle (Manasquan River) – North Jersey Coast Line (bascule)
- Beach Bridge, Atlantic City (Beach Thorofare) – Atlantic City Line (swing)
- Delair Bridge, Pennsauken (Delaware River) – Atlantic City Line (vertical lift) (owned and operated by Conrail)

== Rolling stock ==
NJ Transit operates a fleet of 175 locomotives and over 1,200 passenger cars.

=== Locomotives ===
Builder and model	Photo	Numbers	Number active	Type	Built
EMD GP40PH-2		4100, 4101, 4109	3	Diesel	1968
EMD GP40PH-2B		4200–4219	19	Diesel	1965–1969
EMD F40PH-2CAT		4119, 4120	2	Diesel	1981
Alstom PL42AC		4000–4032	29	Diesel	2005–2006
Bombardier ALP-46		4600–4628	29	Electric	2001–2002
Bombardier ALP-46A		4629–4664	36	Electric	2010–2011
Bombardier ALP-45DP		4500–4534	60+12	Dual-mode (electric and diesel)	2011–2012
Bombardier/Alstom ALP-45A		4535–4559	60+12	Dual-mode (electric and diesel)	2021–present

=== Passenger cars ===
NJ Transit has a fleet of over 1,100 passenger cars. The fleet and examples are described below.

Builder and model	Photo	Numbers	Total	Built
GE Arrow III		1304–1333	30 single cars (no lavatory)	1977
GE Arrow III		1334–1533	200 paired cars (lavatory in odd cars)	1977
Bombardier Comet II		5300–5460	161 trailers (no lavatories)	1982–1989 Rebuilt 1999–2003
Bombardier Comet IV		5011–5031	21 cab cars (lavatory)	1996
Bombardier Comet IV		5235–5264	30 trailers (lavatory)	1996
Bombardier Comet IV		5535–5582	48 trailers (no lavatory)	1996
Alstom Comet V		6000–6083	84 cab cars (lavatory)	2002–2004
Alstom Comet V		6200–6213	14 trailers (lavatory)	2002–2004
Alstom Comet V		6500–6601	102 trailers (no lavatory)	2002–2004
Bombardier MultiLevel Coach		7000–7051	52 cab cars (lavatory)	2006–2010
Bombardier MultiLevel Coach		7200–7298	99 trailers (lavatory)	2006–2010
Bombardier MultiLevel Coach		7500–7677	178 trailers (no lavatory)	2006–2010
Bombardier MultiLevel Coach II		7052–7061	10 cab cars (lavatory)	2012–2013
Bombardier MultiLevel Coach II		7678–7767	90 trailers (no lavatory)	2012–2013
Alstom MultiLevel Coach III		N/A	374 cars	2024–present

== Stations ==
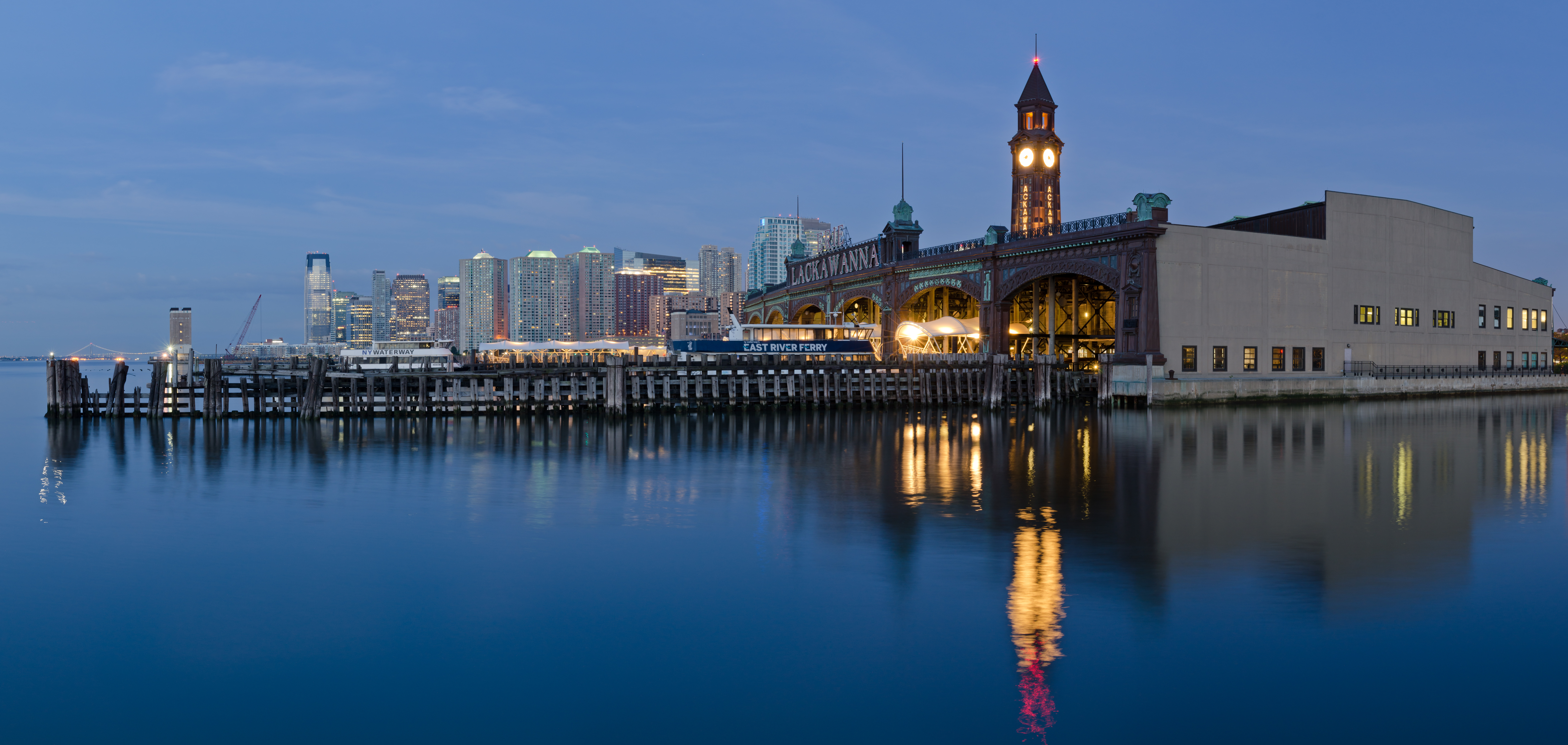
Hoboken Terminal, the terminus for all trains headed east on the Hoboken Division

NJ Transit provides passenger service on 12 lines at total of 165 stations, some of which are operated in conjunction with Amtrak and Metro-North (MNCW).
