= Upper Hack Lift =

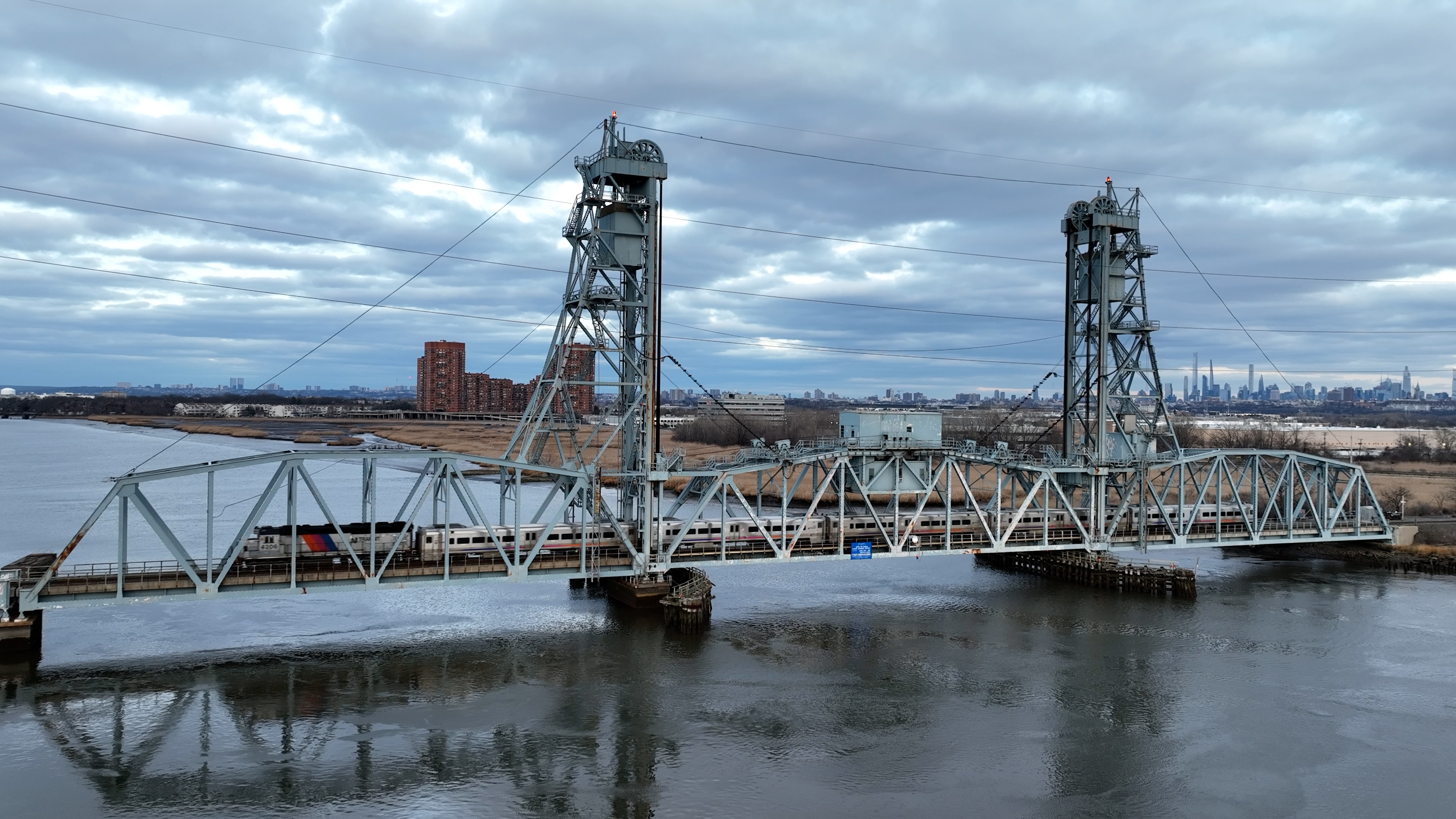
- The bridge in 2023
- Coordinates: 40.778015°N 74.089906°W
- Carries: One track of NJ Transit Main Line
- Crosses: Hackensack River
- Locale: Secaucus and Lyndhurst, New Jersey
- Official name: Upper Hack Bridge
- Other name(s): Upper Hackensack Lift, Erie Lift, West Secaucus Bridge
- Maintained by: NJ Transit

Characteristics
- Design: Lift bridge
- Longest span: 127 feet
- Clearance below: 8 ft (lowered); 110 ft (raised)

History
- Opened: March 1959

Upper Hack Lift is a lift bridge carrying the New Jersey Transit Main Line across the Hackensack River at mile 6.9 between Secaucus, New Jersey and Lyndhurst.

== History ==
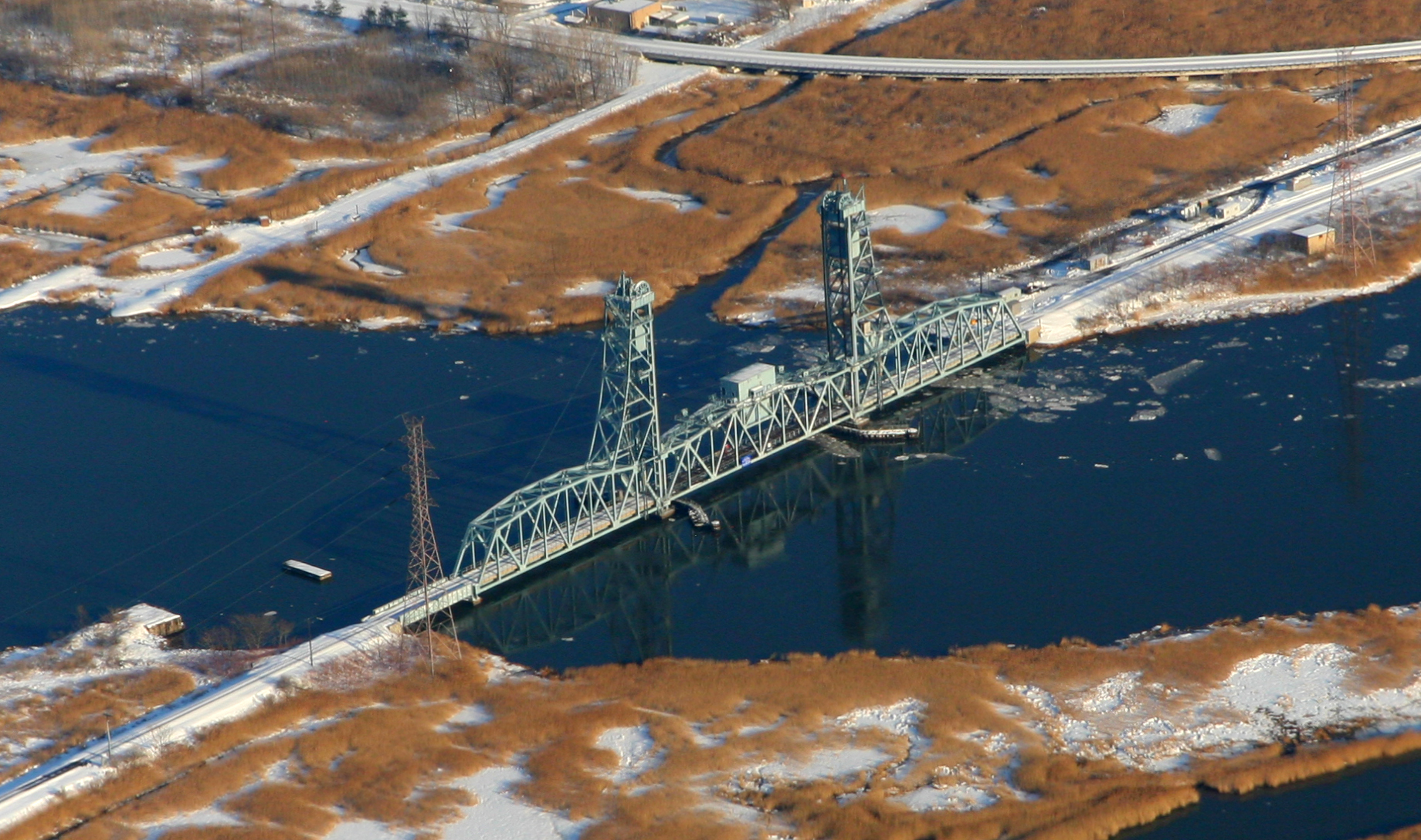
Aerial view in 2014

It was built by the Delaware, Lackawanna and Western Railroad in 1958 and completed in March 1959 to serve the Boonton Branch and replaced an older swing span from 1901 on the site, which had been damaged by shifting currents. The new single-track lift bridge cost $5.5 million, financed through a five-year bank loan.

Following a 1963 route realignment, Erie Main Line service began using the bridge, with Erie Lackawanna, NJDOT and later NJ Transit Main Line commuter service continuing to use the route. It was repainted in 1994 to its current turquoise blue color.

Upper Hack is the only single-track lift bridge in New Jersey (excluding the Arthur Kill Vertical Lift Bridge connecting to Staten Island). It is visible to motorists on the New Jersey Turnpike's western spur between Interchanges 15W and 16W.

Remnants of the older swing span are visible just to the north of the current lift span, as concrete abutments and piers remain.

The current drawbridge schedule at Upper Hack (as stated by U.S. Coast Guard, 33 CFR 117.723) allows the bridge to open on signal unless the bridge tender is at the nearby HX Draw on the Bergen County Line upstream.

== See also ==
- List of crossings of the Hackensack River
- List of bridges, tunnels, and cuts in Hudson County, New Jersey
- NJT movable bridges
- Hackensack RiverWalk
- Timeline of Jersey City area railroads
