= Bombardier MultiLevel Coach =

Bi-level passenger rail car

Bombardier MultiLevel Coach Alstom Adessia coach
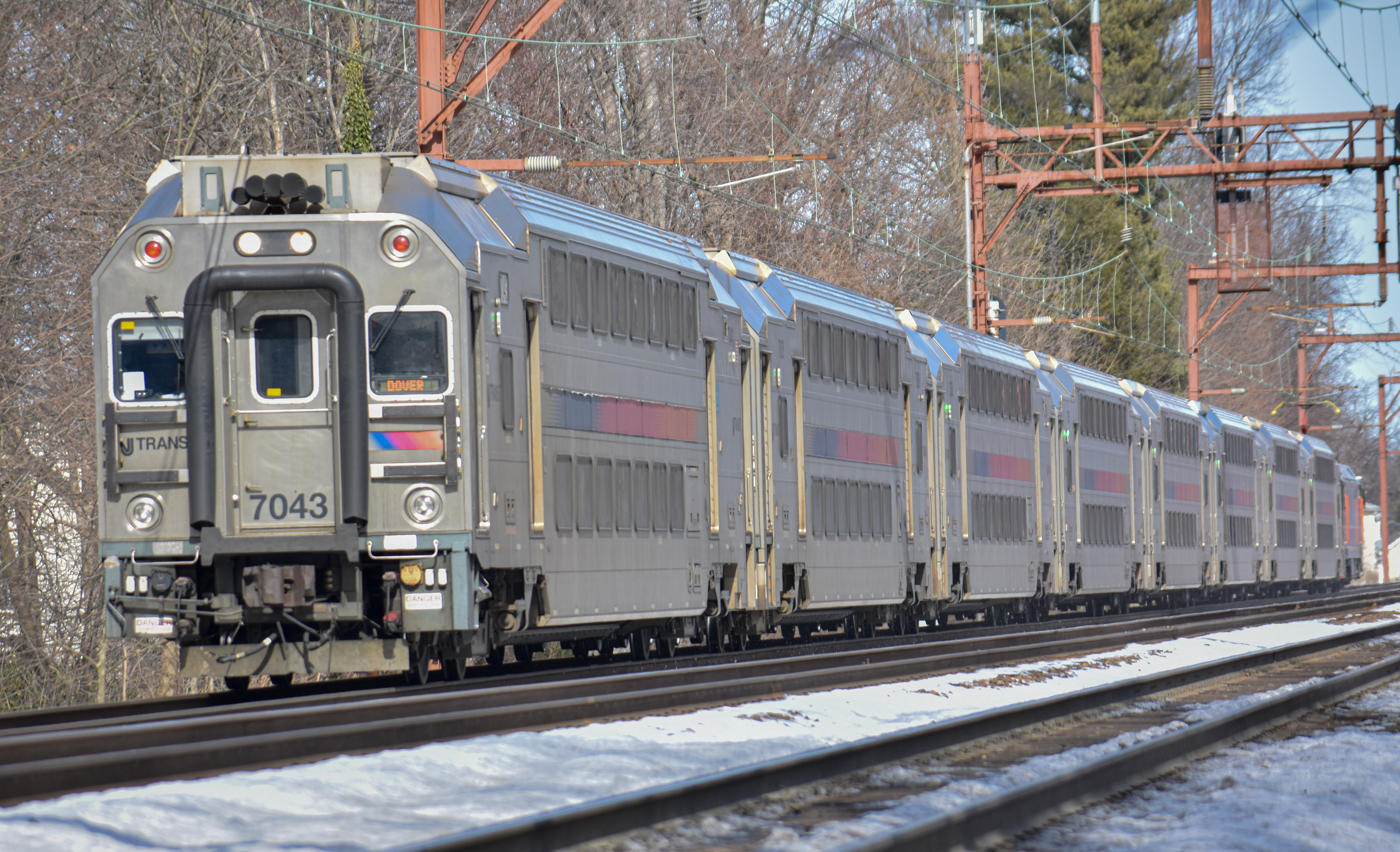
- NJ Transit MultiLevel cab car No. 7043 passing Mountain Station

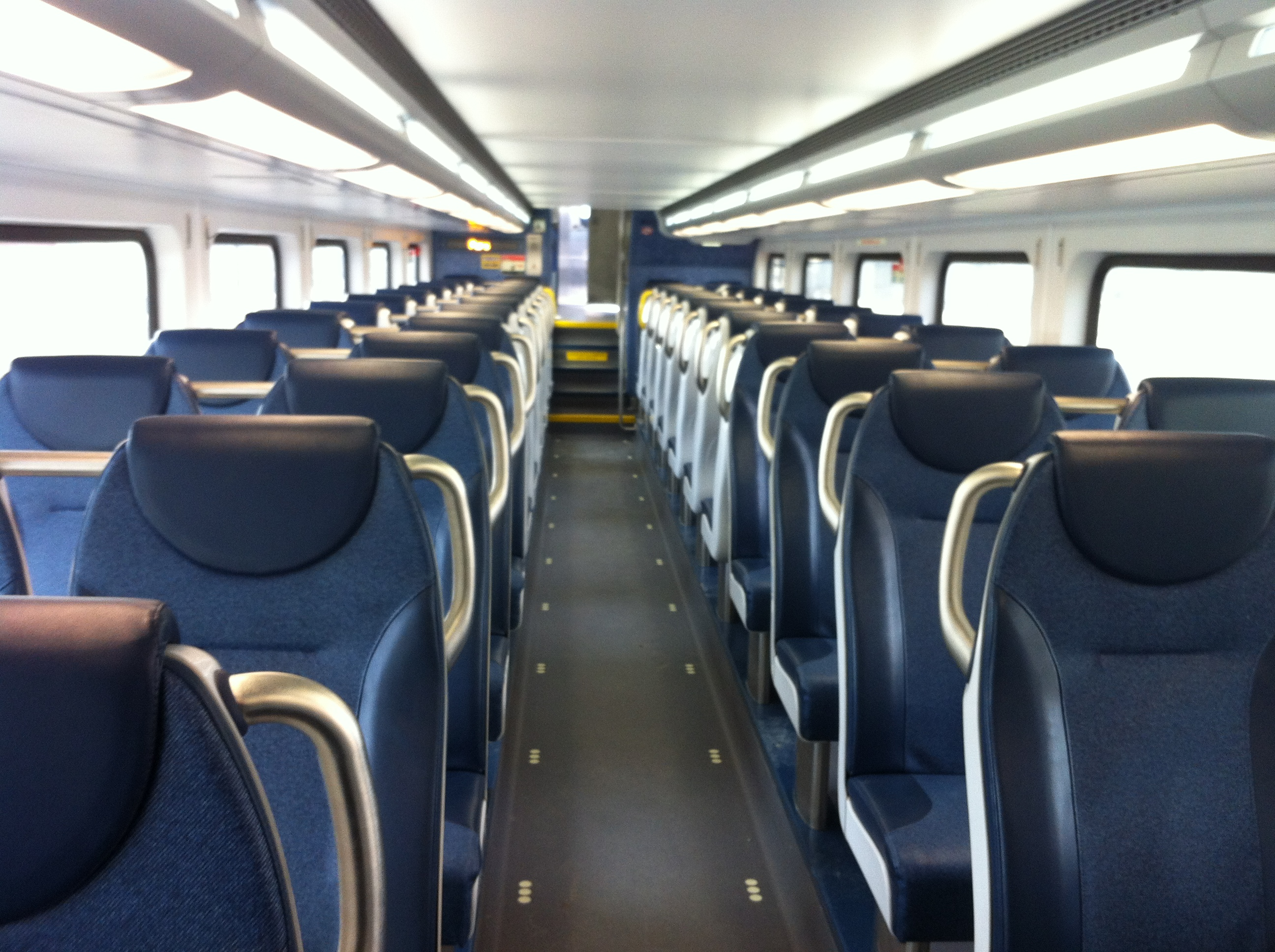
- Interior of an Exo MultiLevel coach
- In service: 2006–Present
- Manufacturer: Bombardier Transportation/Alstom
- Entered service: MultiLevel I: NJT: 2006; Exo: 2009; MultiLevel II: NJT: 2012; MARC: 2014
- Number under construction: 374
- Number built: 643
- Number in service: 643
- Capacity: 127-130 (cab car); 132-135 (trailer car w/ restroom); 142 (trailer car); 110 (power car)
- Operators: NJ Transit, Exo, MARC

Specifications
- Car body construction: Stainless steel
- Car length: 85 ft (25.91 m)
- Width: 10 ft 0 in (3.05 m)
- Height: 14 ft 6 in (4.42 m)
- Platform height: 4 ft 3 in (1.295 m)
- Wheel diameter: 36 in (914 mm) (new); 33 in (838 mm) (worn)
- Maximum speed: 110 mph (177 km/h)
- Weight: 139,000 lb (63,049 kg) (cab car); 134,380 lb (60,954 kg) (trailer car w/ restroom); 132,490 lb (60,096 kg) (trailer car); 181,000 lb (82,100 kg) (power car)
- Power output: 3,082 hp (2,298 kW) (power car only)
- Tractive effort: 160 kN (36,000 lb_{f}) starting (power car only)
- Power supply: 480 V 3-phase AC 60 Hz
- Minimum turning radius: 250 ft (76 m) radius/ 23° (single unit)
- Braking systems: Pneumatic disc and shoe Regenerative/Dynamic (power car only)
- Track gauge: 4 ft 8 1/2 in (1,435 mm) standard gauge

Notes/references
- Sourced from and except where noted

The Bombardier MultiLevel Coach is a bi-level passenger rail car for use on North American commuter rail lines. Originally built by Bombardier Transportation beginning in 2006, they are now built by Alstom since 2021, which markets the coaches as part of their Adessia series.

The first units were delivered by Bombardier in 2006 for New Jersey Transit and Montreal's Exo. Over 643 have been delivered in various orders, including a later purchase by Maryland's MARC. NJ Transit later ordered an additional 113 cars in 2021 from Alstom, which purchased Bombardier.

== Overview ==
There are 643 cars in service as of 2015 on NJ Transit, Montreal's Exo, and Maryland's MARC. NJ Transit received 429 cars, including 62 cab cars. Exo has purchased 160 cars, including 26 cab cars. The MARC order consists of 39 trailers and 15 cab cars for a total of 54 cars.

The coaches were based on the Comet V and have a two-by-two seating arrangement and more knee and leg room than single-level coaches. The seats are also bigger and it has 15-30% more seating than on single-level coaches. The intermediate levels have 5 inward-facing seats on each side which flip up for wheelchairs or bicycles. On cab cars, a large equipment locker behind the cab replaces one row of seats. There are single-width side doors at intermediate levels for high-platform loading, and similar doors outboard of the bogies except at the cab position on cab cars. The latter doors of NJ Transit coaches have stepwell trapdoors, allowing these doors to be used for both high and low-platform loading. Exo coaches have one-piece end doors without traps, which can be used only for low-platform loading. There are also an automated announcement system and LED destination screens.

Compared to the Bombardier BiLevel Coach, the MultiLevel has a smaller loading gauge and was specifically designed to fit through the North River Tunnels under the Hudson River.

Eight MultiLevel cars were previously designated for the now-discontinued Atlantic City Express Service. These included the addition of first class seating sections and lounge facilities. After the ACES was discontinued in 2012, the cars were converted to regular NJT cars by Bombardier from 2013 until 2014. They re-entered NJT service in mid-2014.

=== Service history ===
The first order for the coaches was placed in December 2002 by NJ Transit when it purchased 100 cars, with deliveries beginning in 2005. In September 2005, the agency ordered 131 additional cars. After exercising further contract options, the last order of which was placed in August 2008, a total of 329 first-generation cars were eventually purchased by NJ Transit. In December 2007, Exo's predecessor, the Agence métropolitaine de transport (AMT) placed an order for 160 cars via a base order for 30 units and options for 130 more, though all options were exercised immediately. The cars began to enter service in late 2009.

In September 2010, NJ Transit ordered 100 additional coaches, designated MultiLevel II, with options for 79 more. The MultiLevel II's were built with a different jumper arrangement than the MultiLevel I's. The COMM and MU cabling is not redundant on both sides of the car, which results in the trains being compatible in only one orientation. The MultiLevel I's have redundant jumpers, but lack a bridge to allow differing orientation than a Multilevel II. If a MultiLevel II is present in a consist, all cars need to have the same orientation for the train to function. Other noticeable changes in this order include a transition from backlit segmented LCD to pixel LED display and metal Algrip vestibule floor covers as opposed to Darkar composite found on MLI's.

In October 2011, MARC Train ordered 54 cars—15 cab cars and 39 trailing cars—from the NJ Transit options. The remaining 25 options were not exercised.

In December 2018, NJ Transit ordered 113 additional coaches, designated MultiLevel III; the order included 55 unpowered cars and 58 powered cars with AC electric propulsion systems, which when coupled to other MultiLevel cars will form multiple units, allowing the train to be propelled without a separate electric locomotive. The contract included options for up to 636 more cars, of which, as of May 2025, a total of 374 have been ordered. The new multilevel cars are to replace NJ Transit's Arrow III EMUs and remaining single level Comet equipment. Maximum speed of the power cars is 110 mph (180 km/h). Alstom, which acquired Bombardier in 2021, will complete the order. In September 2025, NJ Transit executed options for 200 more units previously approved in the May 2025 budget request. These will be delivered through 2031, with 50 options remaining.

In October 2022, it was announced that NJ Transit will spend approximately US$8 million to replace the glazed polycarbonate windows on the entire fleet. Many of the windows have become permanently clouded due to heat and UV exposure, making visibility difficult. As of the end of 2025, over 100 cars have had their windows replaced.

== Operators ==
Operator	Years Built	Qty.	Notes
NJ Transit	2006–2009	329	52 cab cars, 277 trailers (99 w/ restroom)
NJ Transit	2012–2013	100	10 cab cars, 90 trailers
NJ Transit	2024–2031	374	112 power cars, 100 cab cars, 162 trailers (18 w/ restroom)
Exo	2008–2011	160	26 cab cars, 134 trailers
MARC	2014	54	15 cab cars, 39 trailers
Total		1,017	

== Gallery ==
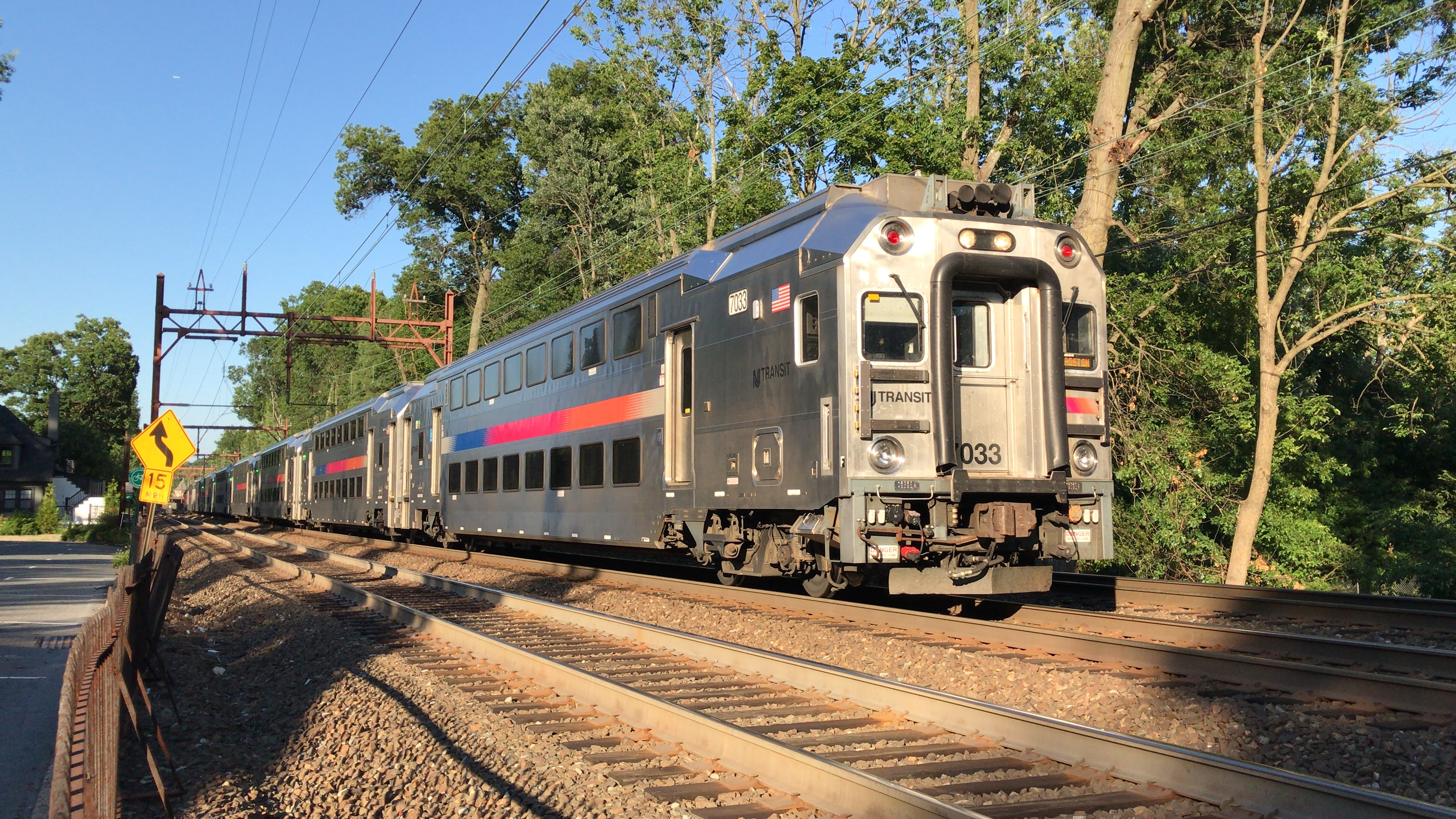
NJ Transit Multilevel coach at Maplewood

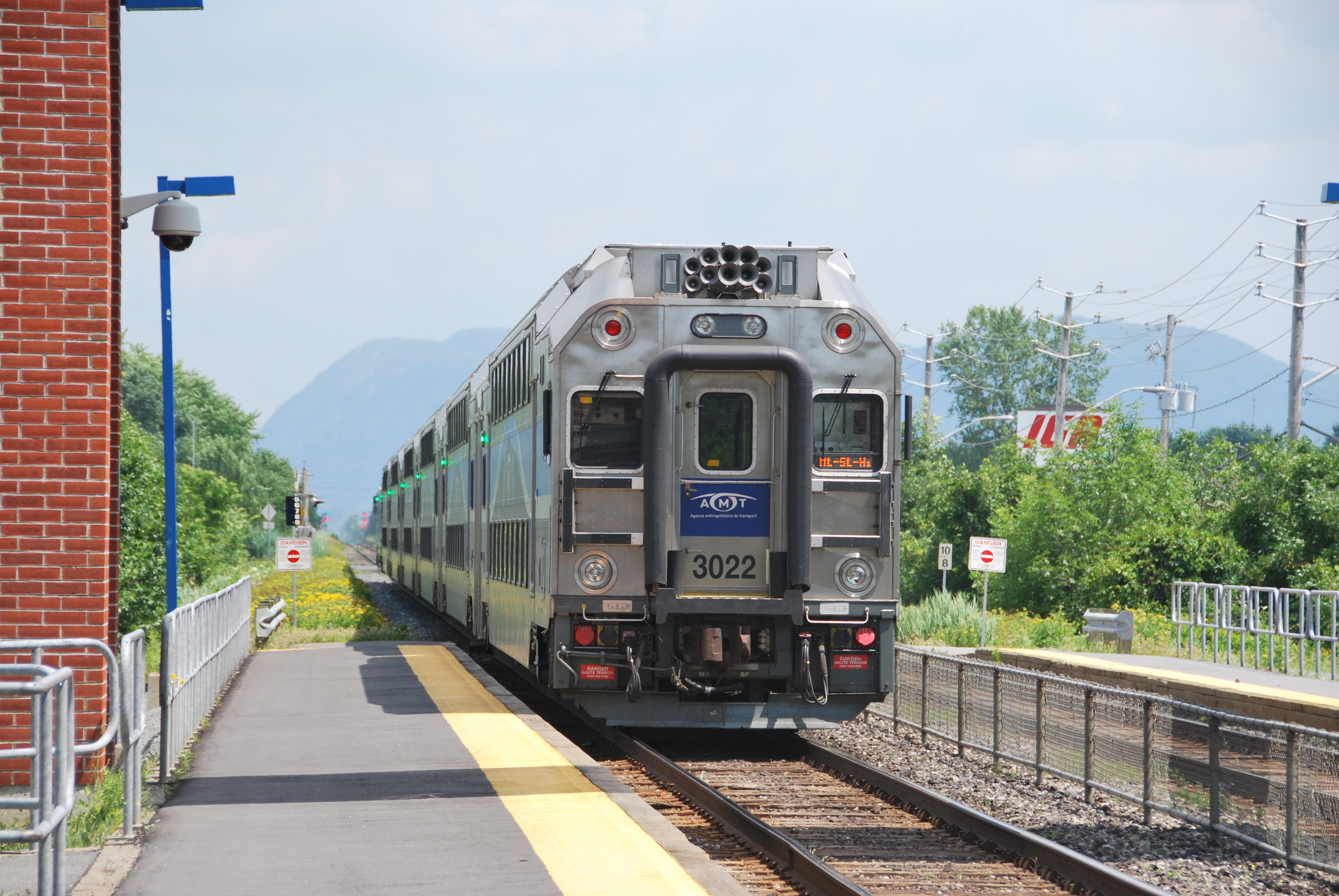
Exo (formerly AMT) 3000-series MultiLevel coach at Gare Saint-Basile-le-Grand

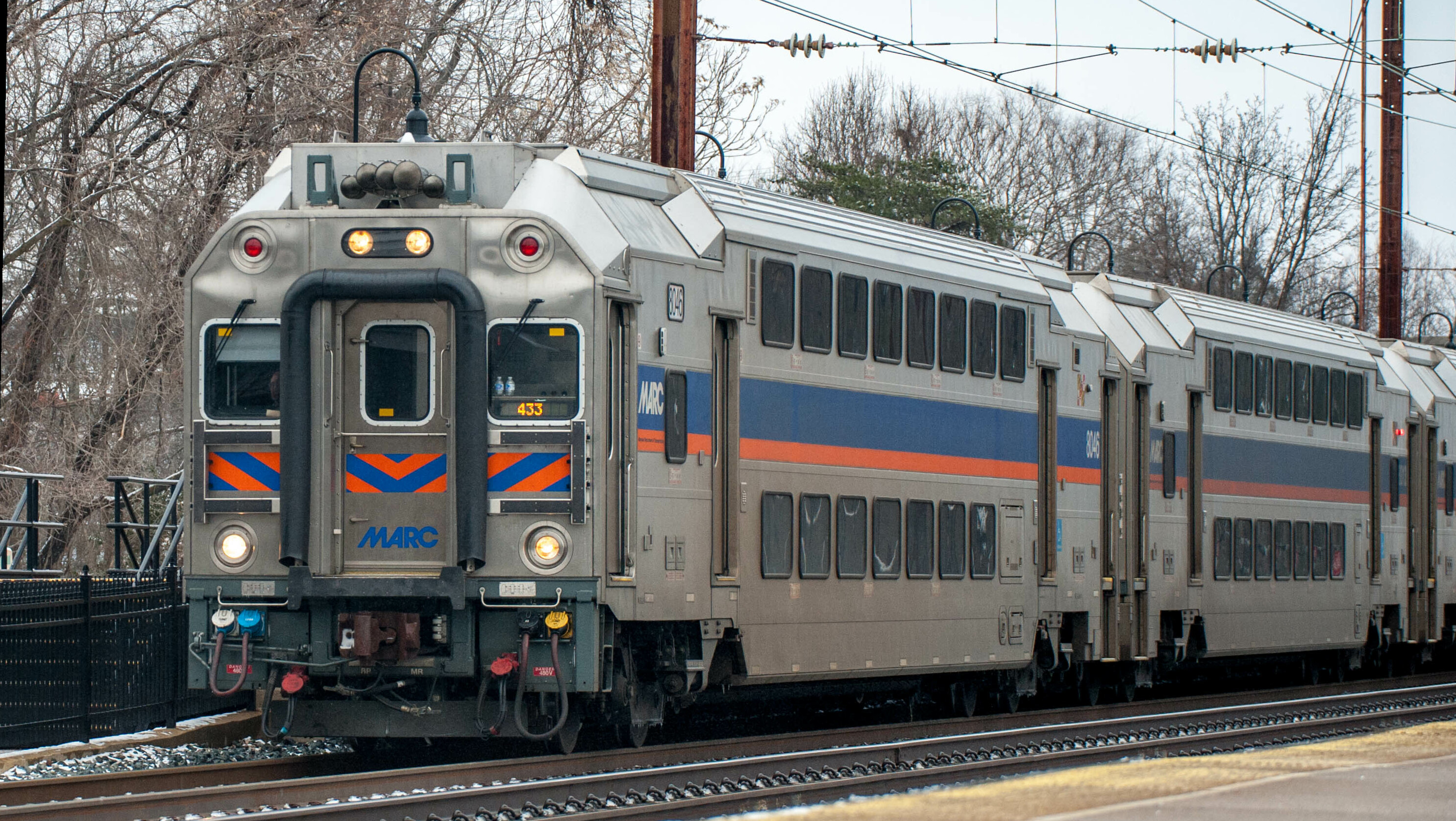
MARC IV MultiLevel coach at Odenton station

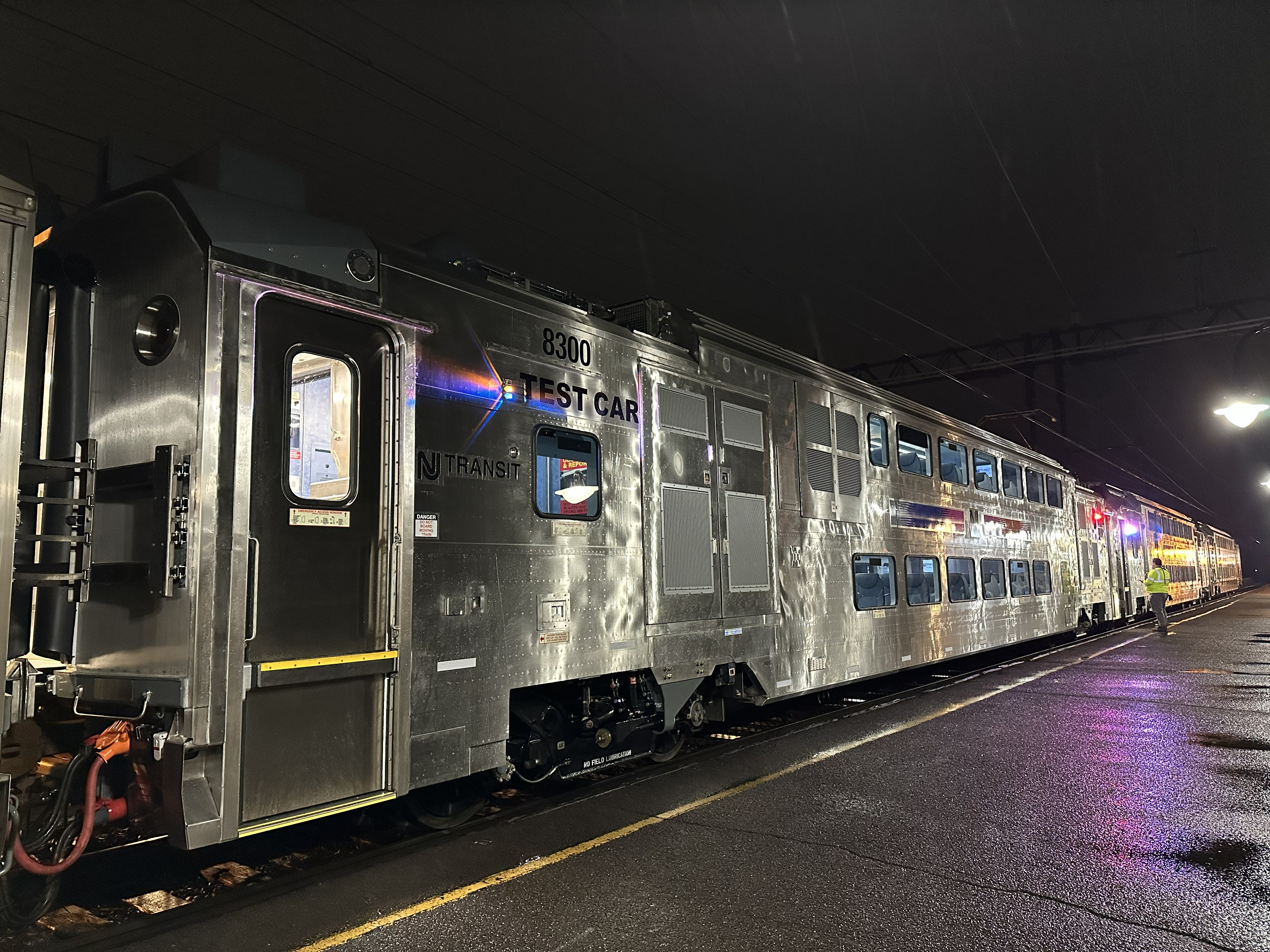
NJ Transit Multilevel power car at Millburn on a test train

== See also ==
- Bombardier BiLevel Coach – double-deck passenger cars that are used for commuter rail across North America
- MBTA Bilevel Cars – double-deck passenger cars operated on the MBTA Commuter Rail in Boston, United States
- New South Wales M set – double-deck trainsets operated on the Sydney Trains network in Sydney, Australia
- Altéo – double-deck trainsets operated on the Réseau Express Régional in Paris, France
