= Frankford Junction station =

Former train stop in Pennsylvania; Northeast Corridor-Atlantic City Line meet point

Frankford Junction
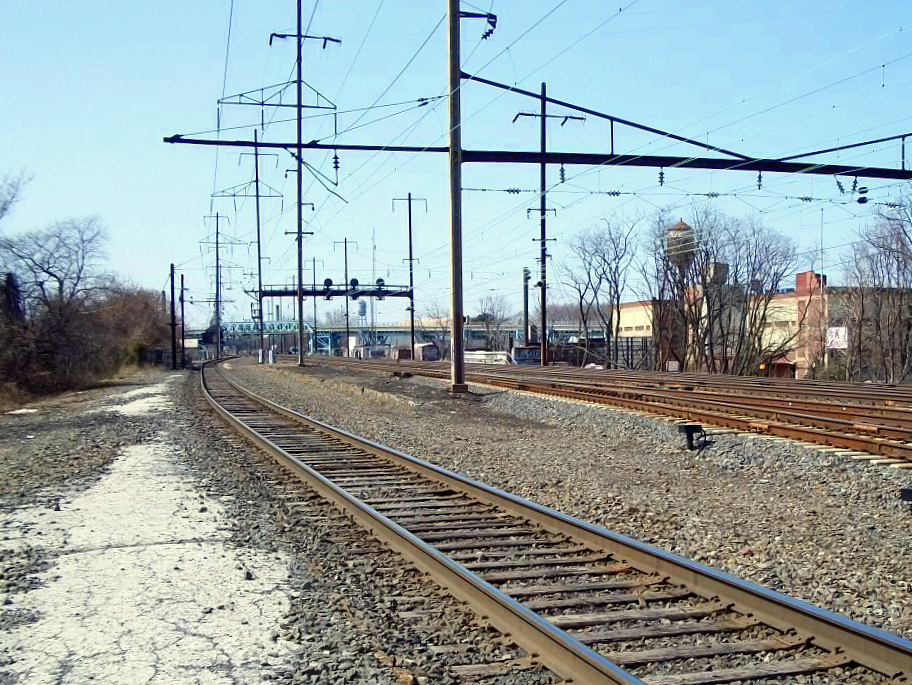
- Remains of Frankford Junction station in 2010

General information
- Location: Frankford Avenue and East Butler Street
- Coordinates: 40.00°N 75.093°W
- Line: Northeast Corridor
- Platforms: 1 side platform
- Tracks: 4, 2, 2 (junction)

Construction
- Structure type: Demolished (2008)
- Platform levels: 2

Other information
- Fare zone: 1

History
- Closed: October 4, 1992
- Electrified: 1935

Former services
Preceding station	SEPTA	Following station
North Philadelphia toward Temple University	Trenton Line	Bridesburg toward Trenton
Preceding station	Pennsylvania Railroad	Following station
North Philadelphia toward Suburban Station	Trenton Line	Bridesburg toward Trenton
North Penn Junction toward Suburban Station	Trenton Line	Frankford toward Trenton
Location

Frankford Junction is a railroad junction, and former junction station, located on the border between the Harrowgate neighborhood of Philadelphia and Frankford, Philadelphia. At the junction, the 4-track Northeast Corridor line from Trenton connects with the 2-track Atlantic City Line from Atlantic City in the northeastern portion of Philadelphia about 2.9 miles (4.7 km) northeast of North Philadelphia station. It lies near the intersection of Frankford Avenue and Butler Street, to the west of the interchange between Interstate 95 and the approach to the Betsy Ross Bridge. It has been used for rail transportation since 1832 but has not served as a station since October 4, 1992.

== Overview ==
The junction has seen a mass of freight and passenger service throughout its existence. In 1832 the Philadelphia and Trenton Railroad (P&T) was formed and started service with a small yard. The line extended southwest of the junction and on to destinations north. In 1871 the railroad was leased by the Pennsylvania Railroad (PRR). During this time a new branch was formed, namely the Tioga Street Branch, consisting of trackage running down the middle of Tioga Street. The branch was later sold to the Kensington and Tacony Railroad. The Pennsylvania Railroad operated the Connecting Railway (part of today's Northeast Corridor) that carried trains to the south.

Through time the junction passed from the Pennsylvania Railroad to the Penn Central and finally to Amtrak. During the era of the PRR they operated the Congressional, which passed through the junction. Amtrak now operates the Acela Express and Northeast Regional through the junction, although the 4° turn through it imposes the second-lowest speed limit along the Northeast Corridor line of 50 miles per hour (80 km/h)(second to only Bridgeport, Connecticut where the tracks make a nearly 90-degree turn on both sides of the station, limiting speeds to only 30 MPH).

The junction started to dwindle as a station in its older years, with the last service coming from Southeastern Pennsylvania Transportation Authority (SEPTA) in the 1990s along the Trenton Line (formerly known as the R7 Line). The junction still sees many trains, both freight and passenger, none of which serve the station platforms that still exist. Today the original P&T line still stretches for a few city blocks, terminating abruptly at Ann Street. It is still used for local freight service. A Conrail freight line splits from the Northeast Corridor at this location and continues to New Jersey via the Delair Bridge. NJ Transit maintains the Atlantic City Line through the junction that serves 30th Street Station to Atlantic City Rail Terminal with local service daily. Amtrak and SEPTA pass through on the Northeast Corridor. There is an abandoned track that used to be for local freight on the north side of the junction. The switching yard is still maintained with continuously decreasing service.

== Accidents ==
On September 6, 1943, a deadly accident occurred when an axle detached from a train as the result of an undiscovered hot box, causing it to derail. 79 people were killed and more were injured.

On May 12, 2015, Amtrak Northeast Regional no. 188 from Washington DC to New York derailed as it was traversing Frankford Junction. Eight people were killed and 200 more were injured.

== See also ==
- Delair Bridge along the Atlantic City Line is just southeast of Frankford Junction
- Frankford Arsenal was 1.4 miles (2.3 km) east-northeast of the junction starting in 1816
- 1943 Frankford Junction train wreck details the September 6, 1943 accident
- 2015 Philadelphia train derailment describes the May 12, 2015 incident
- Lists of rail accidents
