= Derailment =

Form of train incident

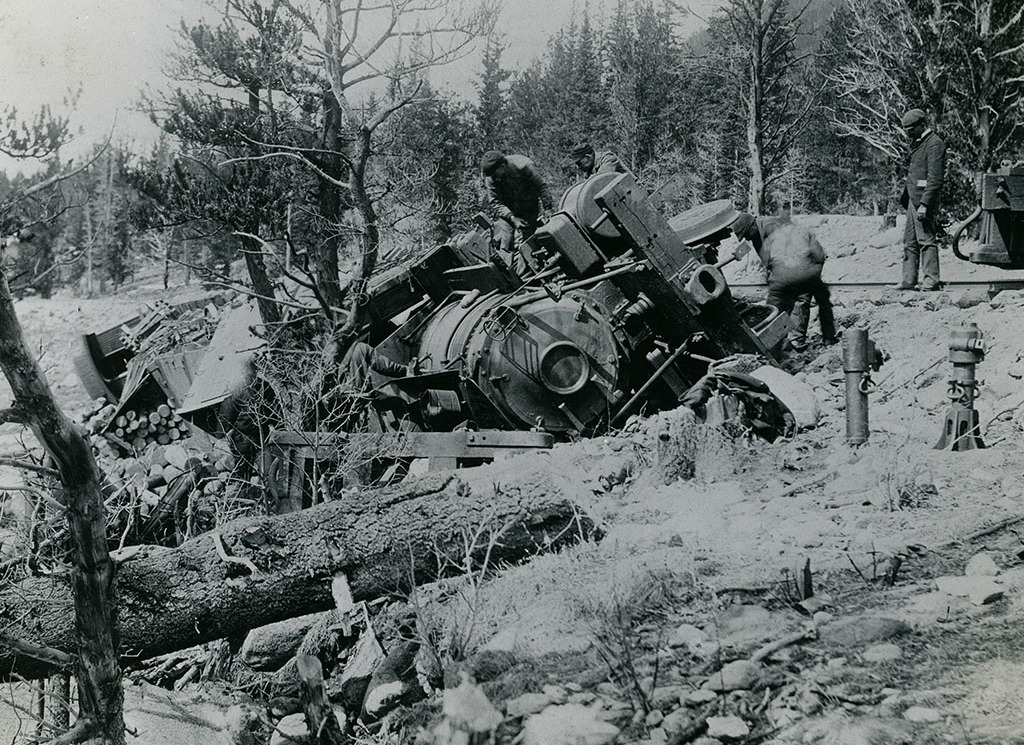
Train wreck in Leavick, Colorado, in 1897

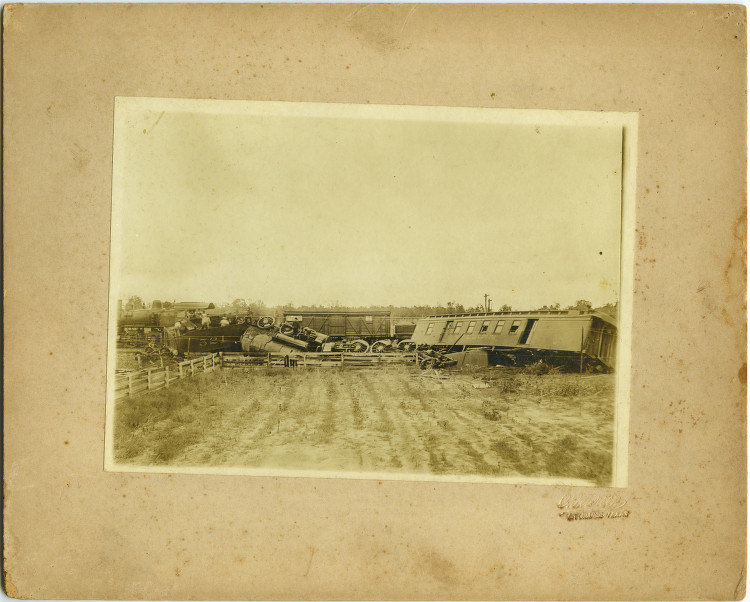
A c. 1890s picture by "C. Petersen" Fayette County, Texas, of a train derailment

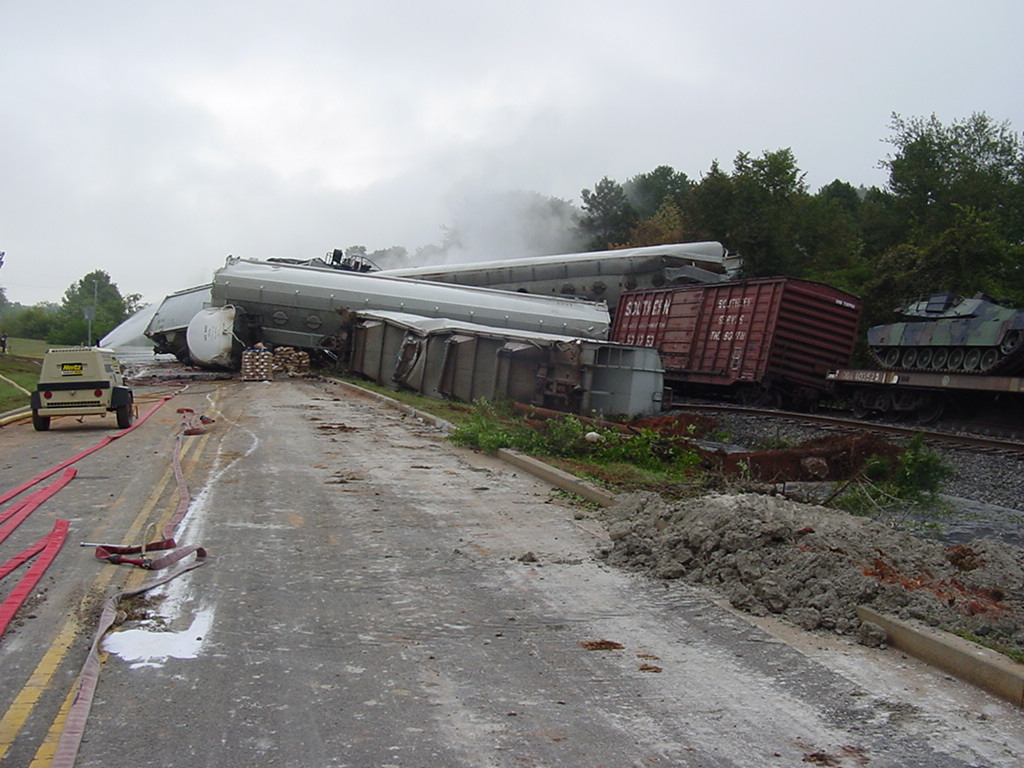
A derailed freight train in Farragut, Tennessee (2002)

In rail transport, a derailment is a type of railway accident that occurs when a moving rail vehicle such as a train comes off its rails. Although many derailments are minor, all result in temporary disruption of the proper operation of the railway system and they are a potentially serious hazard.

A derailment of a train can be caused by a collision with another object, operator error (such as excessive speed through a curve), mechanical failure of tracks (such as broken rails) or wheels, among other causes. In emergency situations, deliberate derailment with derails or catch points is sometimes used to prevent a more serious accident.

== History ==
=== United States ===
The first recorded train derailment in history is known as the Hightstown rail accident in New Jersey that occurred on 8 November 1833. The train was traveling between Hightstown and Spotswood, New Jersey, and derailed after an axle broke on one of the carriages as a result of a journal box catching fire. The derailment resulted in one fatality and twenty-three injuries, and it was recorded that both New York railroad magnate Cornelius Vanderbilt and former U.S president John Quincy Adams were on the train as it took place, in which Adams wrote about the event in his journal.

During the 19th century derailments were commonplace, but progressively improved safety measures have resulted in a stable lower level of such incidents. A sampling of annual approximate numbers of derailments in the United States includes 3000 in 1980, 1000 in 1986, 500 in 2010, and 1000 in 2022. Although considerably less common than they were a century or even half a century ago, major incidents do still occur from time to time. Besides operator error, system failure due to aging infrastructure, often combined with constant or even increasing demand, has played a growing role in accidents, especially along the busiest corridors. In the past two decades, notable recent derailments include:

- East Palestine, Ohio, train derailment - February 3, 2023: Norfolk Southern freight train transporting chemicals derails in East Palestine, Ohio. The spillage of hundreds of thousands of pounds of hazardous materials causes an environmental disaster. The National Transportation Safety Board (NTSB) concluded that the accident was the result of an overheated wheel bearing. On March 4th another Norfolk Southern train derailed in Ohio, although railways officials stressed that this time it was not carrying any toxic chemicals and that its contents posed no threat to either the environment or the general public.
- Spuyten Duyvil derailment - December 1, 2013: Metro-North commuter train with 116 passengers derails from a curve in the Spuyten Duyvil neighborhood of the Bronx, a borough of New York City, causing 4 deaths and at least 61 injuries. According to the NTSB, the train had been traveling at 82 mph (132 kph) at the time of the accident, far exceeding the 30 mph (48 kph) speed restriction for the curve. The NTSB concluded that this had been the result of operator error, with the engineer having fallen asleep due to a sleep disorder and a recent schedule shift.

==== Incidents over time ====
A line chart plotting derailments per year, for both freight and passenger railroad operations in the United States since 1975.

View chart definition.

== Causes ==
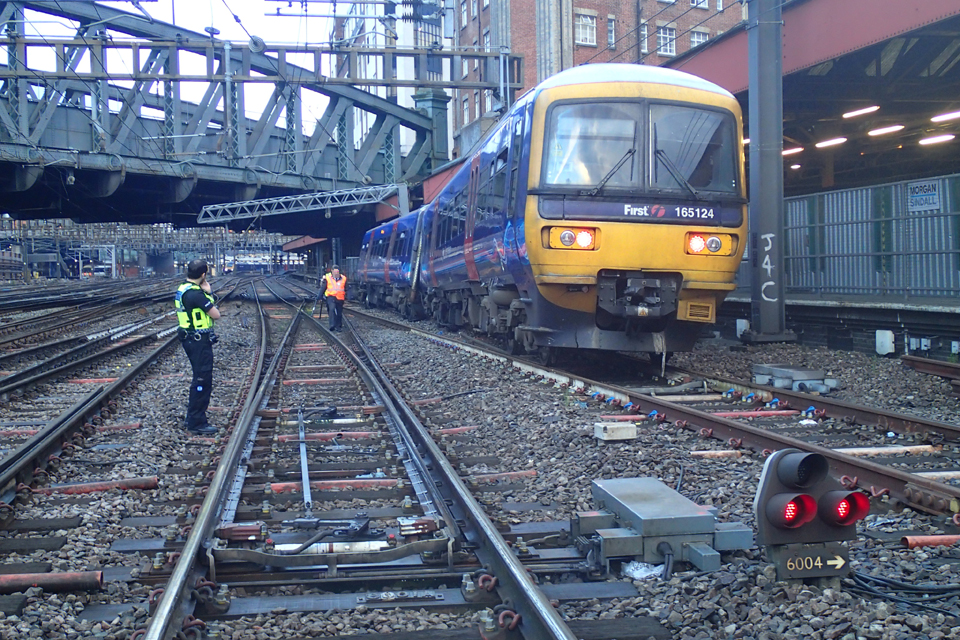
A derailed British Rail Class 165 at London Paddington station. The train moved over a set of catch points which caused the derailment. After derailing, the rear of the train hit an overhead line stanchion, severely damaging the driver's side of the front coach.

Derailments result from one or more of a number of distinct causes; these may be classified as:

- the primary mechanical failure of a track component (for example broken rails, gauge spread due to sleeper (tie) failure)
- the primary mechanical failure of a component of the running gear of a vehicle (for example axlebox failure, wheel breakage)
- a fault in the geometry of the track components or the running gear that results in a quasi-static failure in running (for example rail climbing due to excessive wear of wheels or rails, earthworks slip)
- a dynamic effect of the track-vehicle interaction (for example extreme Hunting oscillation, vertical bounce, track shift under a train, excessive speed)
- improper operation of points, or improper observance of signals protecting them (signal errors)
- as a secondary event following collision with other trains, road vehicles, or other obstructions (level crossing collisions, obstructions on the line)
- train handling (snatches due to sudden traction or braking forces, referred to as slack action in North America).

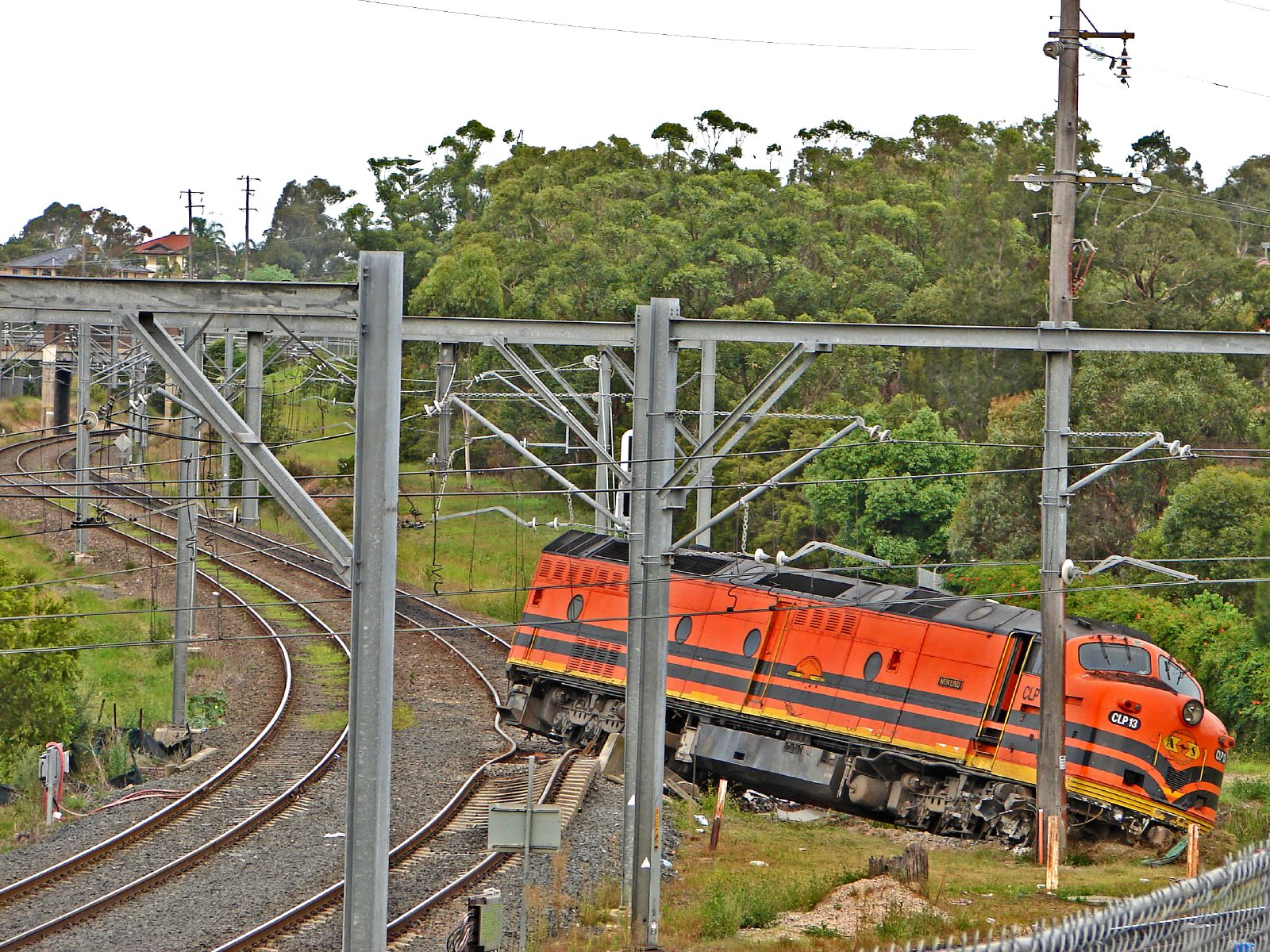
A derailed locomotive unit in Australia at a catch point hidden from view (January 2007)

(Note: The U.S. Federal Railroad Administration categorises derailments differently, for the use of professionals in the industry; these are not completely helpful for external readers, but for completeness, the main groupings are given here: Rail, joint bar and anchoring; Track geometry defect; General switching rules; Wheels; Axles and journal bearings; Switches; Frogs, switches and track appliances; Bogie (truck) components; Train handling / train make-up; Highway rail grading; Source: Safety Database Analysis, Transportation Technology Center Inc, Pueblo Col, 2002, quoted in Wu and Wilson, page 210-211)

=== Broken rails ===
Broken rails are a leading cause of derailments. According to data from the Federal Railroad Administration, broken rails and welds are the most common reason for train derailments, making up more than 15 percent of derailment cases.

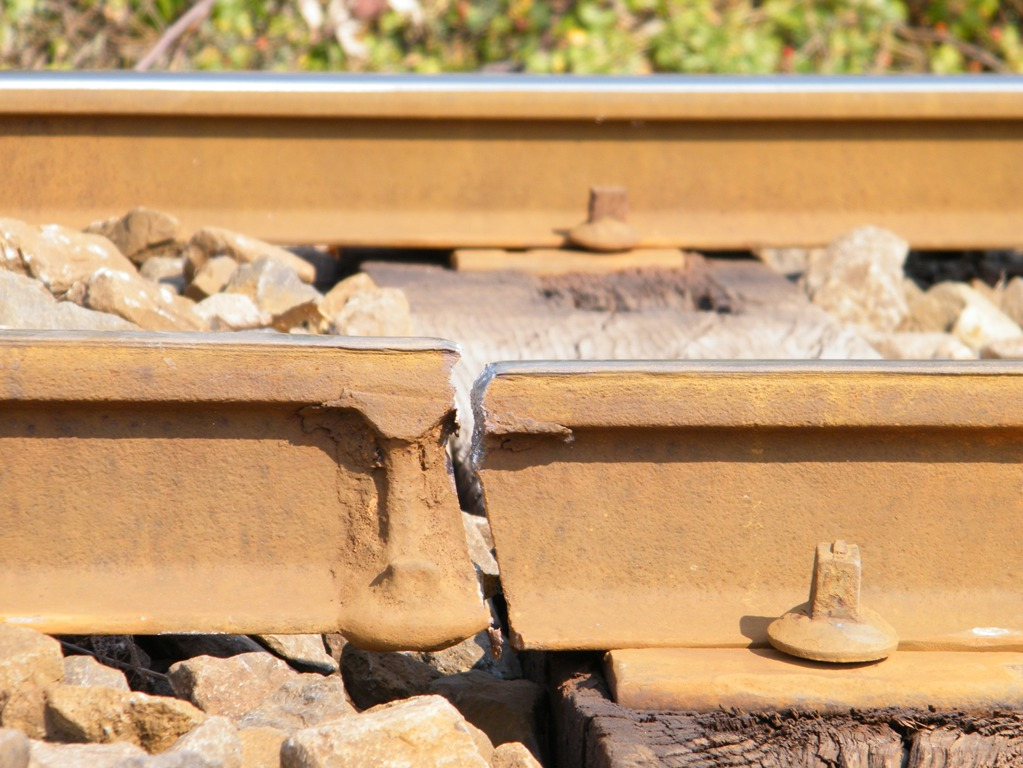
A broken rail at a weld, probably starting from hydrogen embrittlement in the rail head

A traditional track structure consists of two rails, fixed at a designated distance apart (known as the track gauge), and supported on transverse sleepers (ties). Some advanced track structures support the rails on a concrete or asphalt slab. The running surface of the rails is required to be practically continuous and of the proper geometrical layout.

In the event of a broken or cracked rail, the rail running surface may be disrupted if a piece has fallen out, or become lodged in an incorrect location, or if a large gap between the remaining rail sections arises. 170 broken (not cracked) rails were reported on Network Rail in the UK in 2008, down from a peak of 988 in 1998/1999.

- In jointed track, rails are usually connected with bolted fishplates (joint bars). The web of the rail experiences large shear forces and these are enhanced around the bolt hole. Where track maintenance is poor, metallurgical fatigue can result in the propagation of star cracking from the bolthole. In extreme situations this can lead to a triangular piece of rail at the joint becoming detached.
- Metallurgical changes take place due to the phenomenon of gauge corner cracking (in which fatigue microcracking propagates faster than ordinary wear), and also due to the effects of hydrogen inclusion during the manufacturing process, leading to crack propagation under fatigue loading.
- Local embrittlement of the parent metal may take place due to wheel spin (traction units rotating driving wheels without movement along the track).
- Rail welds (where rail sections are joined by welding) may fail due to poor workmanship; this may be triggered by extremely cold weather or improper stressing of continuously welded rails, such that high tensile forces are generated in the rails.
- The fishplates (joint bars) in jointed track may fail, allowing the rails to pull apart in extremely cold weather; this is usually associated with uncorrected rail creep.

Derailment may take place due to excessive gauge widening (sometimes known as road spread), in which the sleepers or other fastenings fail to maintain the proper gauge. In lightly engineered track where rails are spiked (dogged) to timber sleepers, spike hold failure may result in rotation outwards of a rail, usually under the aggravating action of crabbing of bogies (trucks) on curves.

The mechanism of gauge widening is usually gradual and relatively slow, but if it is undetected, the final failure often takes place under the effect of some additional factor, such as excess speed, poorly maintained running gear on a vehicle, misalignment of rails, and extreme traction effects (such as high propelling forces). The crabbing effect referred to above is more marked in dry conditions, when the coefficient of friction at the wheel to rail interface is high.

=== Defective wheels ===
The running gear – wheelsets, bogies (trucks), and suspension—may fail. The most common historical failure mode is collapse of plain bearings due to deficient lubrication, and failure of leaf springs; wheel tyres are also prone to failure due to metallurgical crack propagation.

Modern technologies have reduced the incidence of these failures considerably, both by design (specially the elimination of plain bearings) and intervention (non-destructive testing in service).

=== Unusual track interaction ===
If a vertical, lateral, or crosslevel irregularity is cyclic and takes place at a wavelength corresponding to the natural frequency of certain vehicles traversing the route section, there is a risk of resonant harmonic oscillation in the vehicles, leading to extreme improper movement and possibly derailment. This is most hazardous when a cyclic roll is set up by crosslevel variations, but vertical cyclical errors also can result in vehicles lifting off the track; this is especially the case when the vehicles are in the tare (empty) condition, and if the suspension is not designed to have appropriate characteristics. The last condition applies if the suspension springing has a stiffness optimised for the loaded condition, or for a compromise loading condition, so that it is too stiff in the tare situation.

The vehicle wheelsets become momentarily unloaded vertically so that the guidance required from the flanges or wheel tread contact is inadequate.

A special case is heat related buckling: in hot weather the rail steel expands. This is managed by stressing continuously welded rails (they are tensioned mechanically to be stress neutral at a moderate temperature) and by providing proper expansion gaps at joints and ensuring that fishplates are properly lubricated. In addition, lateral restraint is provided by an adequate ballast shoulder. If any of these measures are inadequate, the track may buckle; a large lateral distortion takes place, which trains are unable to negotiate. (In nine years 2000/1 to 2008/9 there were 429 track buckle incidents in Great Britain). (Note: On Network Rail, so excluding certain "Metro" networks.)

=== Improper operation of control systems ===
Junctions and other changes of routing on railways are generally made by means of points (switches – movable sections capable of changing the onward route of vehicles). In the early days of railways these were moved independently by local staff. Accidents – usually collisions – took place when staff forgot which route the points were set for, or overlooked the approach of a train on a conflicting route. If the points were not correctly set for either route – set in mid-stroke – it is possible for a train passing to derail.

The first concentration of levers for signals and points brought together for operation was at Bricklayer's Arms Junction in south-east London in the period 1843–1844. The signal control location (forerunner of the signalbox) was enhanced by the provision of interlocking (preventing a clear signal being set for a route that was not available) in 1856.

To prevent the unintended movement of freight vehicles from sidings to running lines, and other analogous improper movements, trap points and derails are provided at the exit from the sidings. In some cases these are provided at the convergence of running lines. It occasionally happens that a driver incorrectly believes they have authority to proceed over the trap points, or that the signaller improperly gives such permission; this results in derailment. The resulting derailment does not always fully protect the other line: a trap point derailment at speed may well result in considerable damage and obstruction, and even a single vehicle may obstruct the clear line.

=== Derailment following collision ===
If a train collides with a massive object, it is clear that derailment of the proper running of vehicle wheels on the track may take place. Although very large obstructions are imagined, it has been known for a cow straying on to the line to derail a passenger train at speed such as occurred in the Polmont rail accident.

The most common obstructions encountered are road vehicles at level crossings (grade crossings); malicious persons sometimes place materials on the rails, and in some cases relatively small objects cause a derailment by guiding one wheel over the rail (rather than by gross collision).

Derailment has also been brought about in situations of war or other conflict, such as during hostility by Native Americans, and more especially during periods when military personnel and materiel was being moved by rail.

=== Harsh train handling ===
The handling of a train can also cause derailments. The vehicles of a train are connected by couplings; in the early days of railways these were short lengths of chain ("loose couplings") that connected adjacent vehicles with considerable slack. Even with later improvements there may be a considerable slack between the traction situation (power unit pulling the couplings tight), and power unit braking (locomotive applying brakes and compressing buffers throughout the train). This results in coupling surge.

More sophisticated technologies in use nowadays generally employ couplings that have no loose slack, although there is elastic movement at the couplings; continuous braking is provided, so that every vehicle on the train has brakes controlled by the driver. Generally this uses compressed air as a control medium, and there is a measurable time lag as the signal (to apply or release brakes) propagates along the train.

If a train driver applies the train brakes suddenly and severely, the front part of the train is subject to braking forces first. (Where only the locomotive has braking, this effect is obviously more extreme). The rear part of the train may overrun the front part, and in cases where coupling condition is imperfect, the resultant sudden closing up (an effect referred to as a "run-in") may result in a vehicle in tare condition (an empty freight vehicle) being lifted momentarily, and leaving the track. This effect was relatively common in the nineteenth century.

On curved sections, the longitudinal (traction or braking) forces between vehicles have a component inward or outward respectively on the curve. In extreme situations these lateral forces may be enough to produce derailment.

A special case of train handling problems is overspeed on sharp curves. This generally arises when a driver fails to slow the train for a sharp curved section in a route that otherwise has higher speed conditions. In the extreme this results in the train entering a curve at a speed at which it cannot negotiate the curve, and gross derailment takes place. The specific mechanism of this may involve bodily tipping (rotation) but is likely to involve disruption of the track structure and derailment as the primary failure event, followed by overturning.

Fatal instances include the Santiago de Compostela derailment in 2013 and the Philadelphia train derailment two years later of trains traveling about 100 miles per hour (160 km/h). Both went at about twice the maximum allowable speed for the curved section of track.

=== Flange climbing ===
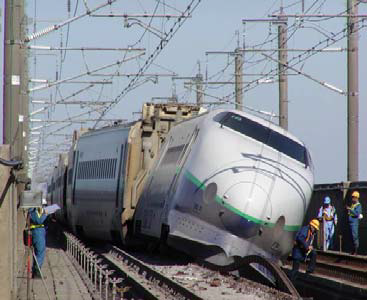
The 2004 Chūetsu earthquake caused the first derailment in the history of the Shinkansen; no injuries were reported among the passengers and crew aboard the train.

The guidance system of practical railway vehicles relies on the steering effect of the conicity of the wheel treads on moderate curves (down to a radius of about 500 m, or about 1,500 feet). On sharper curves flange contact takes place, and the guiding effect of the flange relies on a vertical force (the vehicle weight).

A flange climbing derailment can result if the relationship between these forces, L/V, is excessive. The lateral force L results not only from centrifugal effects, but a large component is from the crabbing of a wheelset which has a non-zero angle of attack during running with flange contact. The L/V excess can result from wheel unloading, or from improper rail or wheel tread profiles. The physics of this is more fully described below, in the section wheel-rail interaction.

Wheel unloading can be caused by twist in the track. This can arise if the cant (crosslevel, or superelevation) of the track varies considerably over the wheelbase of a vehicle, and the vehicle suspension is very stiff in torsion. In the quasi-static situation it may arise in extreme cases of poor load distribution, or on extreme cant at low speed.

If a rail has been subject to extreme sidewear, or a wheel flange has been worn to an improper angle, it is possible for the L/V ratio to exceed the value that the flange angle can resist.

If weld repair of side-worn switches is undertaken, it is possible for poor workmanship to produce a ramp in the profile in the facing direction, that deflects an approaching wheel flange on to the rail head.

In extreme situations, the infrastructure may be grossly distorted or even absent; this may arise from a variety of causes, including earthwork movement (embankment slips and washouts), earthquakes and other major terrestrial disruptions, or deficient protection during work processes, among others.

==== Wheel-rail interaction ====
Nearly all practical railway systems use wheels fixed to a common axle: the wheels on both sides rotate in unison. Tramcars requiring low floor levels are the exception, but much benefit in vehicle guidance is lost by having unlinked wheels.

The benefit of linked wheels derives from the conicity of the wheel treads—the wheel treads are not cylindrical, but conical. On idealised straight track, a wheelset would run centrally, midway between the rails.

The example shown here uses a right-curving section of track. The focus is on the left-side wheel, which is more involved with the forces critical to guiding the railcar through the curve.

Diagram 1 below shows the wheel and rail with the wheelset running straight and central on the track. The wheelset is running away from the observer. (Note that the rail is shown inclined inwards; this is done on modern track to match the rail head profile to the wheel tread profile.)

Diagram 2 shows the wheelset displaced to the left, due to curvature of the track or a geometrical irregularity. The left wheel (shown here) is now running on a slightly larger diameter; the right wheel opposite has moved to the left as well, towards the centre of the track, and is running on a slightly smaller diameter. As the two wheels rotate at the same rate, the forward speed of the left wheel is a little faster than the forward speed of the right wheel. This causes the wheelset to curve to the right, correcting the displacement. This takes place without flange contact; the wheelsets steer themselves on moderate curves without any flange contact.

Wheel-rail interactions
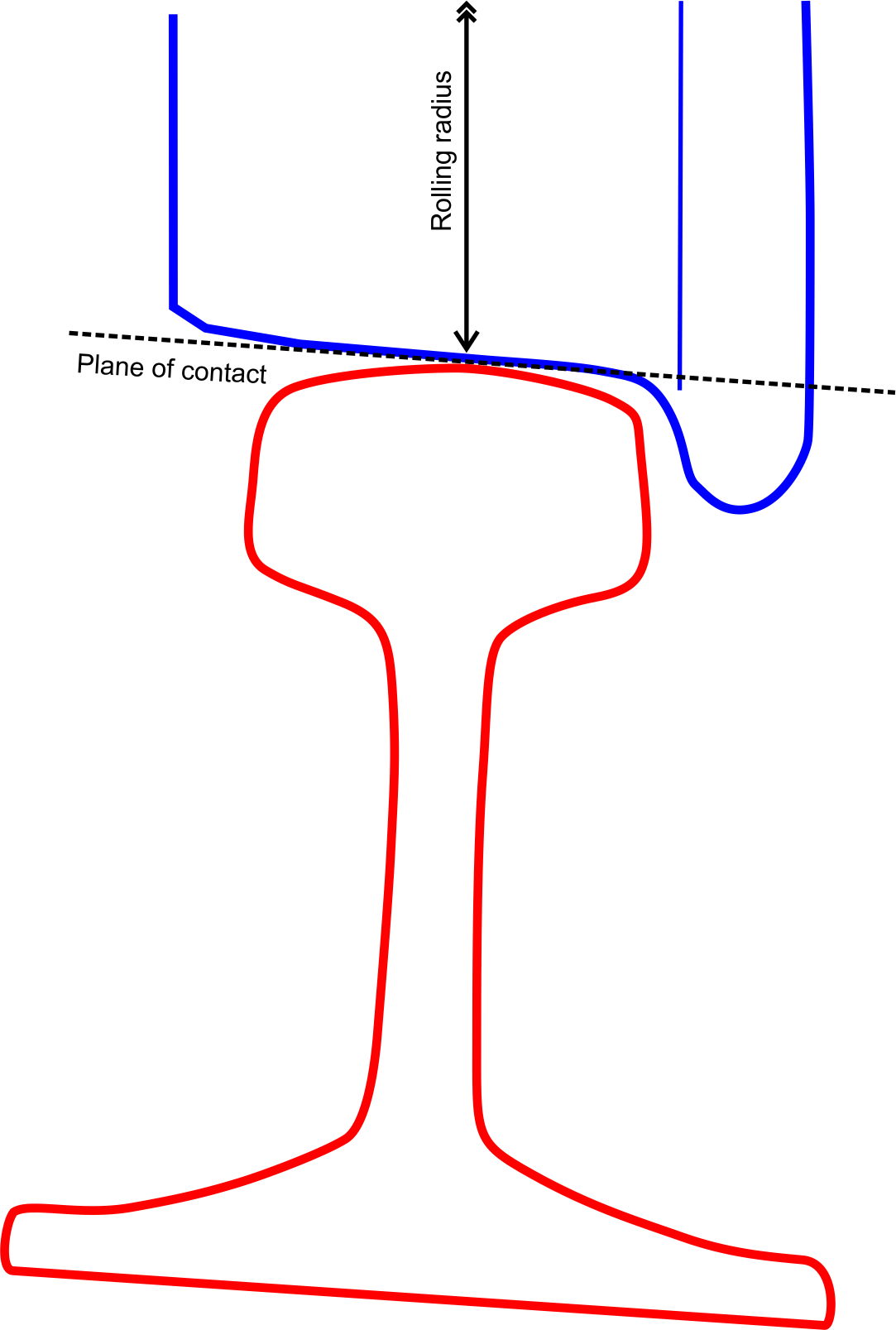
Diagram 1.
Wheel tread and rail during central running (perspective is eye level with and looking along left rail)

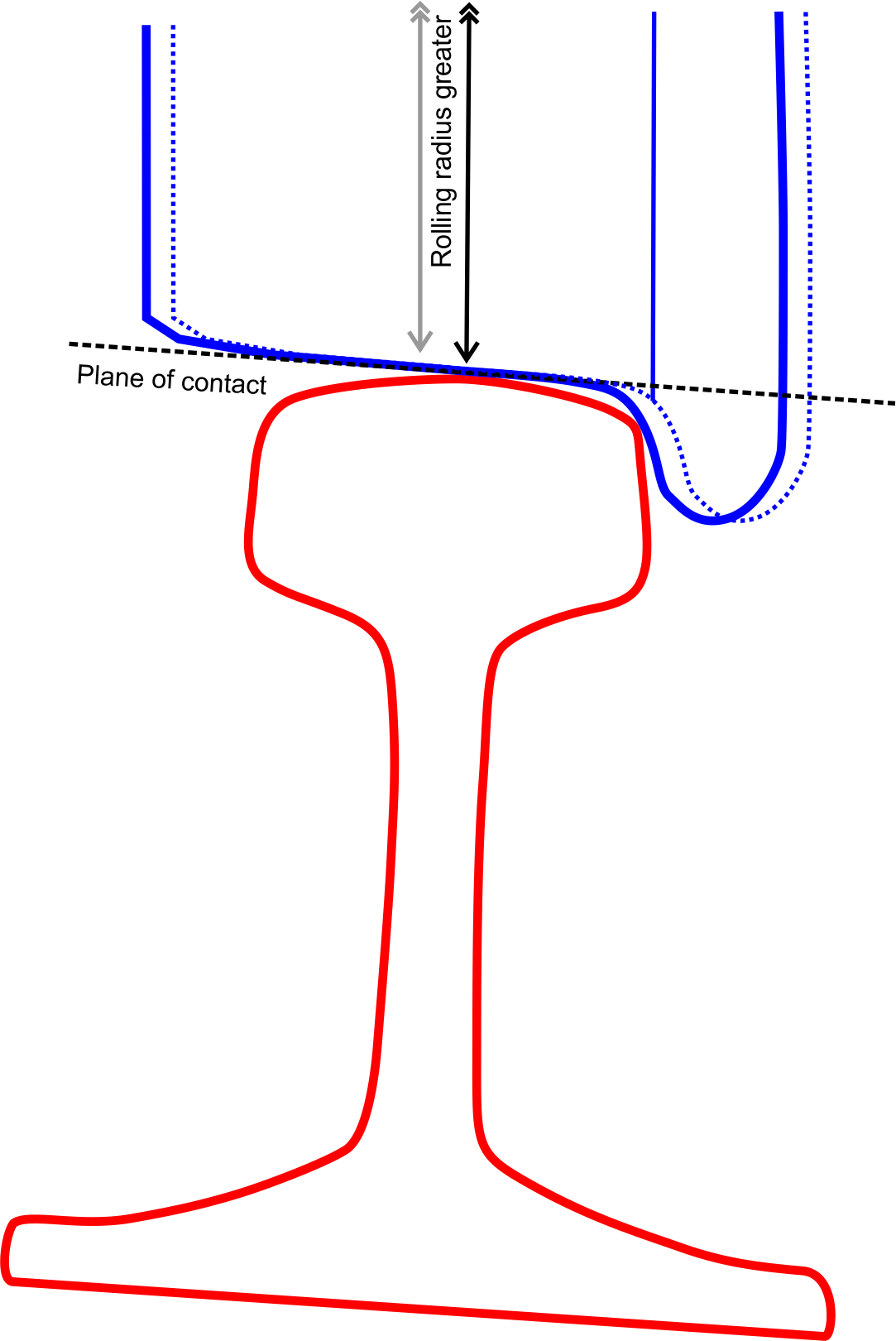
Diagram 2
Wheel and rail with wheel displaced to the left (perspective is eye level with and looking along left rail)

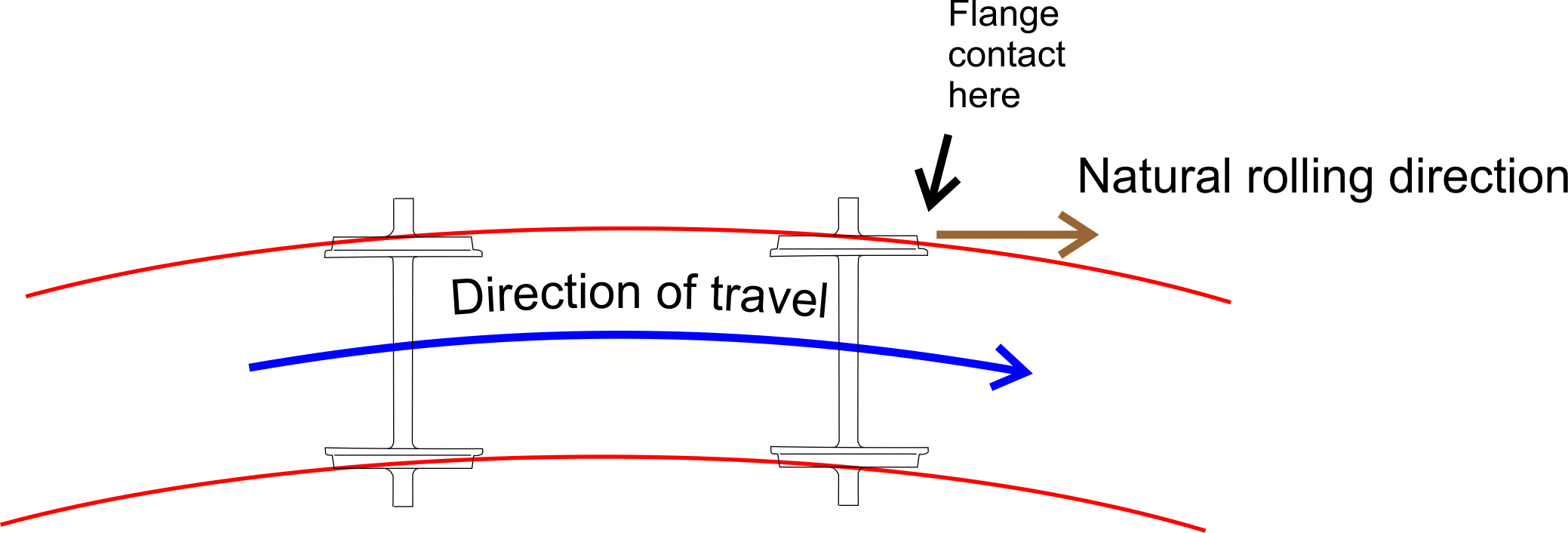
Diagram 3
Bogie and wheelset in a right-turning curve (overhead perspective)

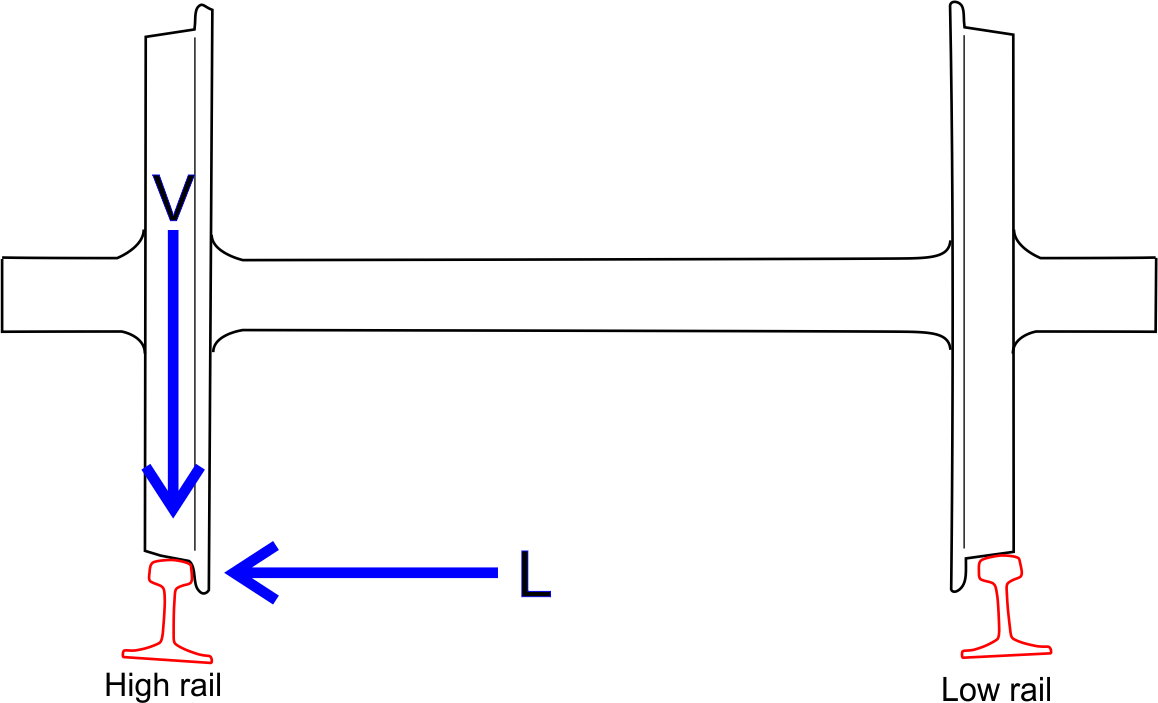
Diagram 4
L and V forces in curving (perspective is eye level with and in between the two rails, looking down the track)

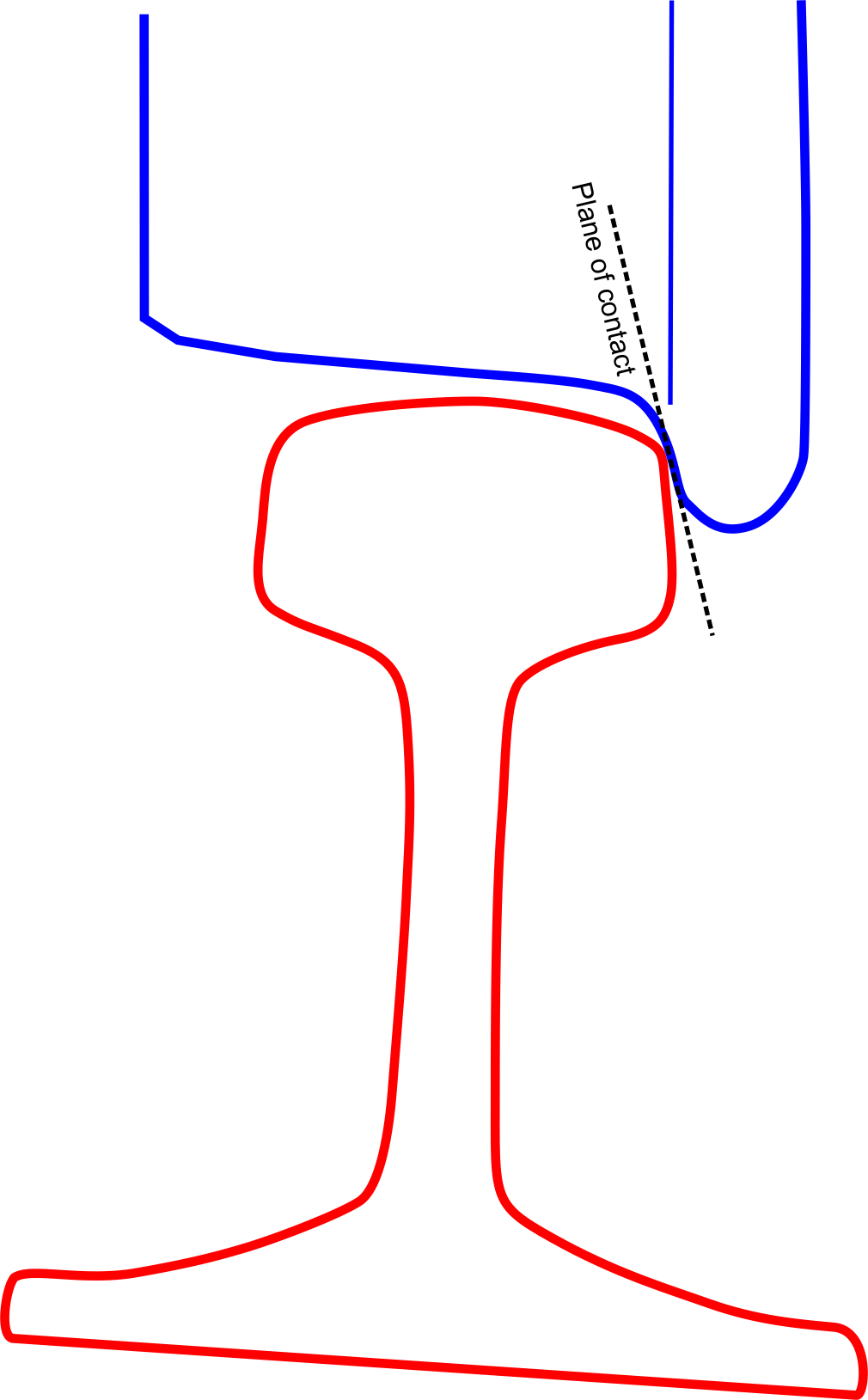
Diagram 5
Wheel and rail during flange climbing (perspective is eye level with and looking along left rail)

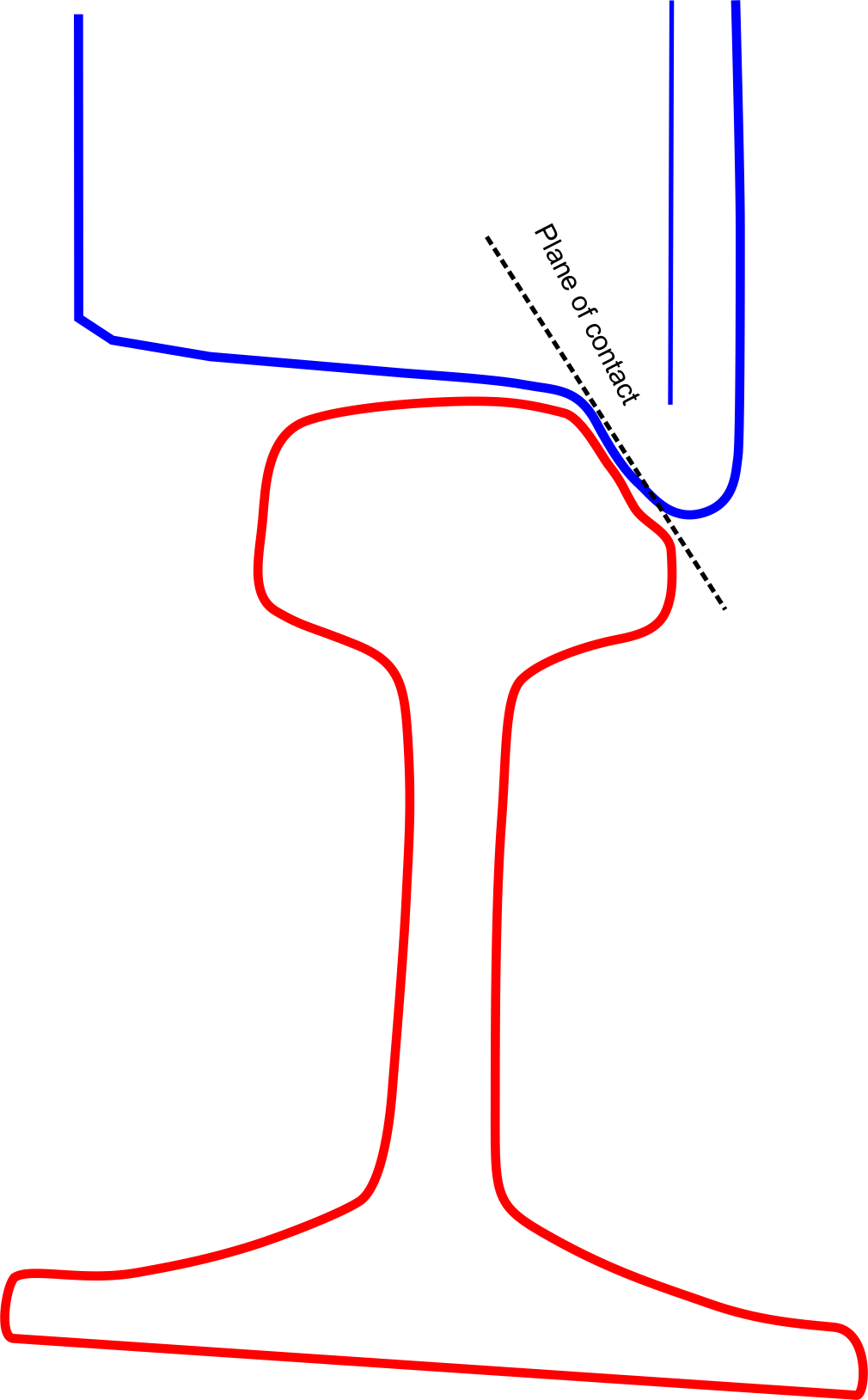
Diagram 6
Worn wheel and rail during flange climbing (perspective is eye level with and looking along left rail)

The sharper the curve, the greater the lateral displacement necessary to achieve the curving. On a very sharp curve (typically less than about 500 m or 1,500 feet radius) the width of the wheel tread is not enough to achieve the necessary steering effect, and the wheel flange contacts the face of the high rail. (Note: The high rail is considered to be the outer rail in a curve; the low rail is the inner rail.)

Diagram 3 shows the running of wheelsets in a bogie or a four-wheeled vehicle. The wheelset is not running parallel to the track: it is constrained by the bogie frame and suspension, and it is yawing to the outside of the curve; that is, its natural rolling direction would lead along a less sharply curved path than the actual curve of the track. (Note: Yaw describes the situation when the longitudinal axis of the wheelset is not the same as the longitudinal axis of motion.)

The angle between the natural path and the actual path is called the angle of attack (or the yaw angle). As the wheelset rolls forward, it is forced to slide across the railhead by the flange contact. The whole wheelset is forced to do this, so the wheel on the low rail is also forced to slide across its rail. (Note: This was understood as early as 1844, when Robert Stephenson gave evidence that "in bringing round the curve, the wheels will all be fixed on the axles, and being of the same size, of course the outside has to go over more ground than the inside and therefore the outside ones slide upon the turn, and consequently, as you see in the Bristol stations [where broad gauge trains were negotiating sharp curves], you will see such wheels grind in their operation." Stephenson was giving evidence in the House of Commons regarding the South Devon Railway bill, on 26 April 1844, quoted in Hugh Howes, The Struggle for the South Devon Railway, Twelveheads Press, Chacewater, 2012, ISBN 978 0 906294 74 1)

This sliding requires a considerable force to make it happen, and the friction force resisting the sliding is designated "L", the lateral force. The wheelset applies a force L outwards to the rails, and the rails apply a force L inwards to the wheels. Note that this is quite independent of "centrifugal force". (Note: Centrifugal force is a convenient imaginary concept; strictly speaking it is the inertia of a body being accelerated, equal to the product of the mass of the body and the acceleration.) However at higher speeds the centrifugal force is added to the friction force to make L.

The load (vertical force) on the outer wheel is designated V, so that in Diagram 4 the two forces L and V are shown.

The steel-to-steel contact has a coefficient of friction that may be as high as 0.5 in dry conditions, so that the lateral force may be up to 0.5 of the vertical wheel load. (Note: The value of L is determined by the load on both wheels of the wheelset multiplied by the coefficient of friction, plus the centrifugal force. But the sliding on the wheel on the low rail is not lateral—the wheel tread is actually sliding backwards (i.e rotating less rapidly than the forward speed requires) and the lateral friction force generated is limited by the vector of the sliding action.)

During this flange contact, the wheel on the high rail is experiencing the lateral force L, towards the outside of the curve. As the wheel rotates, the flange tends to climb up the flange angle. It is held down by the vertical load on the wheel V, so that if L/V exceeds the trigonometrical tangent of the flange contact angle, climbing will take place. The wheel flange will climb to the rail head where there is no lateral resistance in rolling movement, and a flange climbing derailment usually takes place. In Diagram 5 the flange contact angle is quite steep, and flange climbing is unlikely. However, if the rail head is side-worn (side-cut) or the flange is worn, as shown in Diagram 6 the contact angle is much flatter and flange climbing is more likely.

Once the wheel flange has completely climbed onto the rail head, there is no lateral restraint, and the wheelset is likely to follow the yaw angle, resulting in the wheel dropping outside the rail. An L/V ratio greater than 0.6 is considered to be hazardous.

It is emphasised that this is a much simplified description of the physics; complicating factors are creep, actual wheel and rail profiles, dynamic effects, stiffness of longitudinal restraint at axleboxes, and the lateral component of longitudinal (traction and braking) forces.

== Rerailing ==
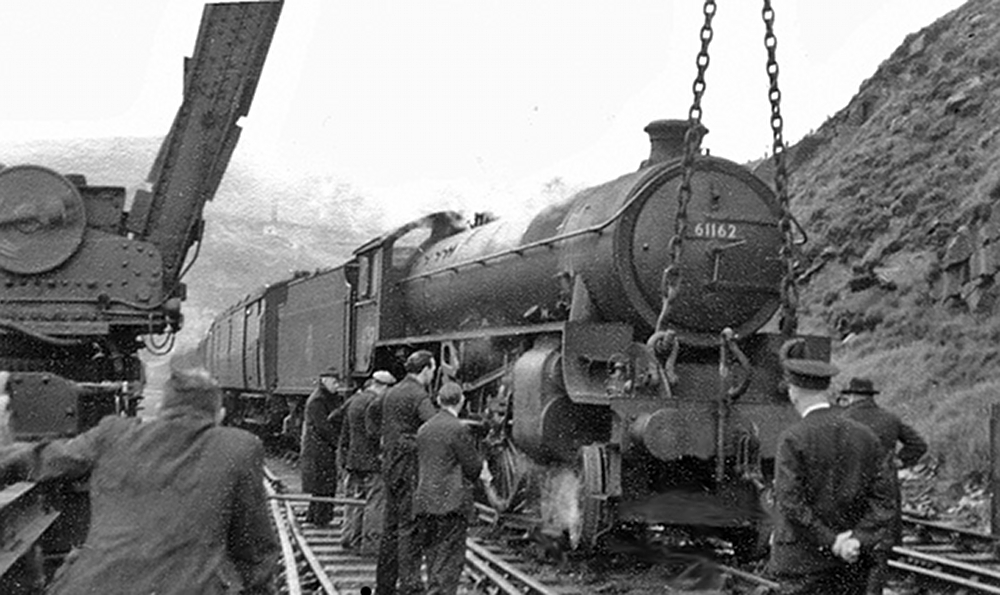
A derailed British Rail (EX. London North Eastern Railway) B1 being lifted back onto the tracks by a rail crane in 1951

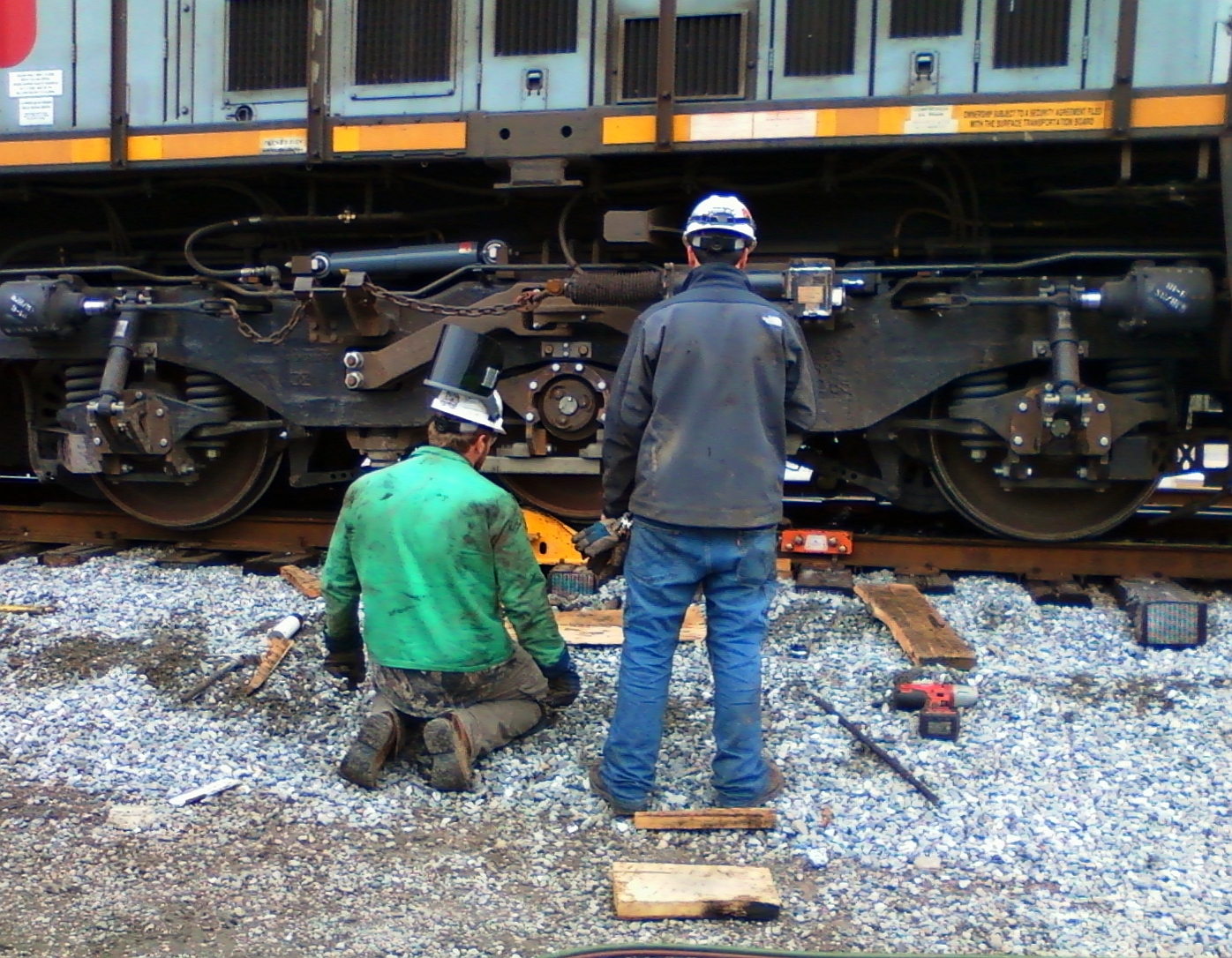
Rerailing a locomotive using a rerailer and wooden blocks after a broken rail derailment

Following a derailment, it is naturally necessary to replace the vehicle on the track. If there is no significant track damage, that may be all that is needed. However, when trains in normal running derail at speed, a considerable length of track may be damaged or destroyed; far worse secondary damage may be caused if a bridge is encountered.

With simple wagon derailments where the final position is close to the proper track location, it is usually possible to pull the derailed wheelsets back on to the track using rerailing ramps; these are metal blocks designed to fit over the rails and to provide a rising path back to the track. A locomotive is usually used to pull the wagon. A disadvantage of doing it this way is that the ramps can seriously damage the infrastructure. Because of which, this procedure may not be used in several countries.

If the derailed vehicle is farther from the track, or its configuration (such as a high centre of gravity or a very short wheelbase) make the use of ramps impossible, jacks may be used. In its crudest form, the process involves lifting the vehicle frame and then allowing it to fall off the jack towards the track. This may need to be repeated.

A more sophisticated process involves a controlled process using slewing jacks in addition. This combination of lifting and sliding is called a hydraulic rerailing system. A system consisting of high pressure hydraulic lifting jacks (used for lifting the train) so a sliding system can be positioned underneath the vehicle. The sliding system consist of a beam (also called a bridge) with sleds or carriages which are moved laterally with a horizontally positioned high pressure hydraulic jack to push the vehicle back above track. After which it is lowered again on the track.

Photographs of early locomotives often indicate one or more jacks carried on the frame of the locomotive for the purpose, presumed to be a frequent occurrence.

When more complex rerailing work is needed, various combinations of cable and pulley systems may be used, or the use of one or more rail-borne cranes to lift a locomotive bodily. In special cases road cranes are used, as these have greater lifting and reach capacity, if road access to the site is feasible.

In extreme circumstances, a derailed vehicle in an awkward location may be scrapped and cut up on site, or simply abandoned as non-salvageable.

== Examples ==
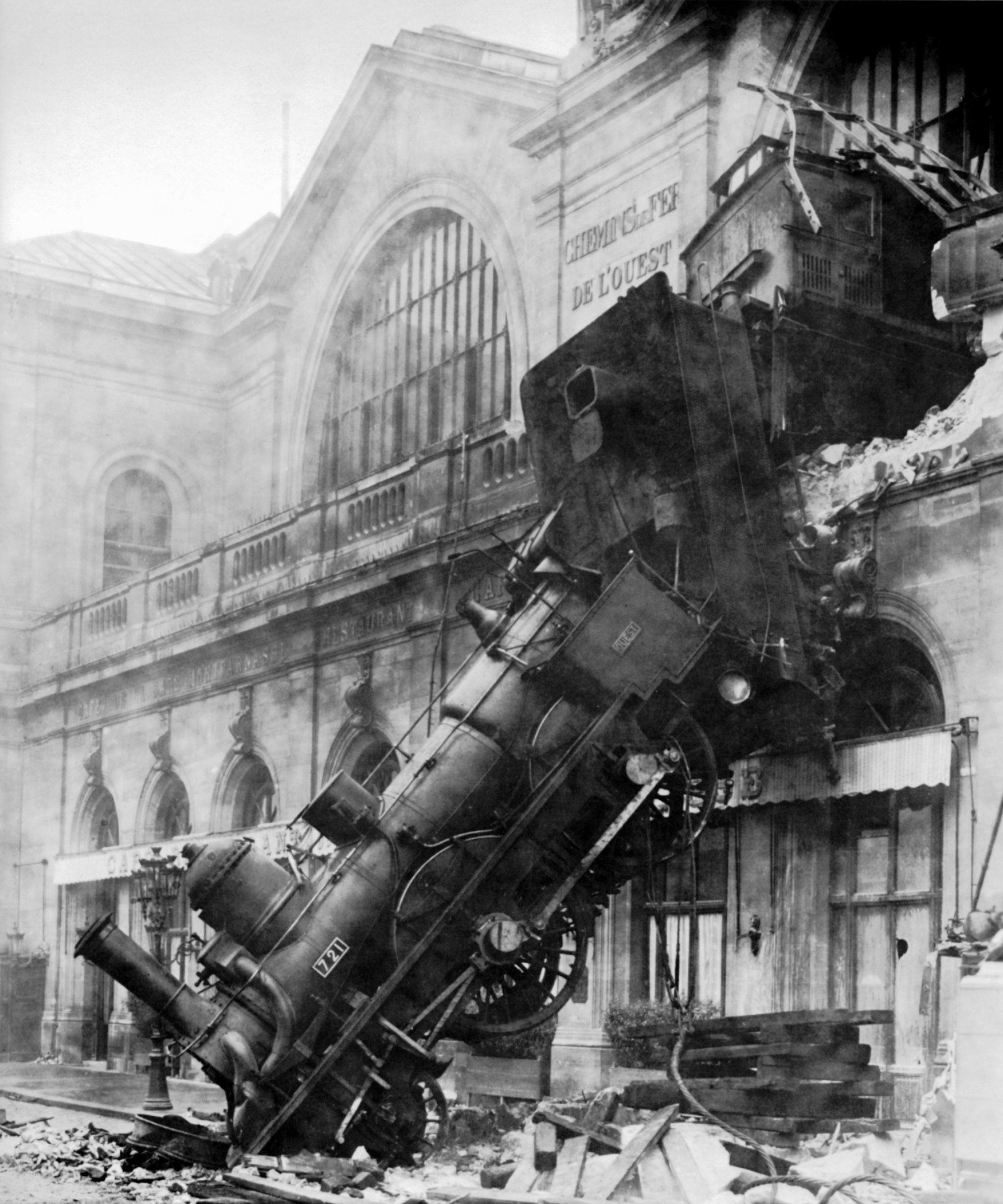
Train derailment at Gare Montparnasse, Paris in 1895

=== Primary mechanical failure of a track component ===
In the Hatfield rail crash in England in 2000, which killed four people, rolling contact fatigue had resulted in multiple gauge corner cracking in the surface; 300 such cracks were subsequently found at the site. The rail cracked under a high speed passenger train, which derailed.

In the earlier Hither Green rail crash, a triangular segment of rail at a joint became displaced, and lodged in the joint; it derailed a passenger train and 49 persons died. Poor maintenance on an intensively operated section of route was the cause.

=== Primary mechanical failure of a component of the running gear of a vehicle ===
In the Eschede train disaster in Germany, a high speed passenger train derailed in 1998, killing 101 people. The primary cause was the fracture from metal fatigue of a wheel tyre; the train failed to negotiate two sets of points and struck the pier of an overbridge. It was the most serious railway accident in Germany, and also the most serious on any high speed (over 200 kilometres per hour (120 mph)) line. Ultrasonic testing had failed to reveal the incipient fracture.

=== Dynamic effects of vehicle–track interaction ===
In 1967 in the UK there were four derailments due to buckling of continuously welded track ("CWR"): at Lichfield on 10 June, an empty carflat train (a train of flat cars for transporting automobiles); on 13 June an express passenger train was derailed at Somerton; on 15 July a freightliner train (container train) was derailed at Lamington; and on 23 July an express passenger train was derailed at Sandy. The official report was not entirely conclusive as to the causes, but it observed that the annual total of buckling distortions was 48 in 1969, having been in single figures in every previous year, and that [heat-related] distortions per 1,000 miles per annum were 10.42 for CWR and 2.98 for jointed track in 1969, having been a maximum of 1.78 and 1.21 in the previous ten years. 90% of the distortions could be attributed to one of the following:

- failure to comply with the instructions for laying or maintaining CWR track
- recent interference with the consolidation of the ballast
- the effect of discontinuities in the CWR track such as points etc.
- extraneous factors such as formation subsidence.

=== Improper operation of control systems ===
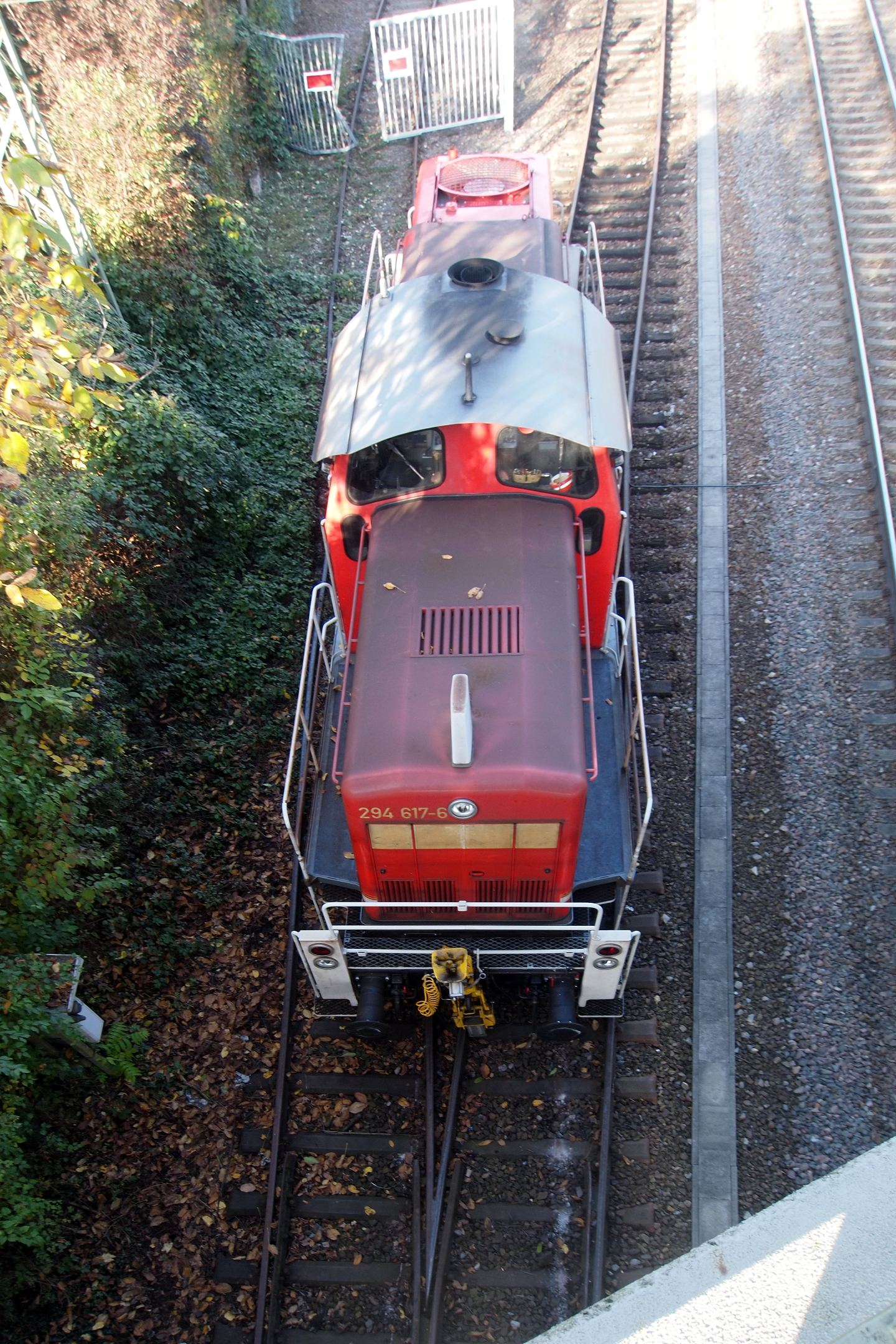
A DB V90 shunter derailed on a disused point

In the Connington South rail crash on 5 March 1967 in England, a signaller moved the points immediately in front of an approaching train. Mechanical signalling was in force at the location, and it was believed that he improperly replaced the signal protecting the points to danger just as the locomotive passed it. This released the locking on the points and he moved them to lead to a loop line with a low speed restriction. The train, travelling at 75 miles per hour (121 km/h), was unable to negotiate the points in that position and five people died.

=== Secondary events following collision ===
A passenger train was derailed in the Polmont rail accident in the UK in 1984 upon hitting a cow at speed; the train formation had the locomotive at the rear (propelling) with a light driving-trailer vehicle leading. The cow had strayed on to the line from adjacent agricultural land, due to deficient fencing. 13 persons died in the resulting derailment. However this was thought to be the first occurrence from this cause (in the UK) since 1948.

=== Train handling effects ===
The Salisbury rail crash took place on 1 July 1906; a first class only special boat train from Stonehousepool, Plymouth England, ran through Salisbury station at about 60 miles per hour (97 km/h); there was a sharp curve of ten chains (660 feet, 200 m) radius and a speed restriction to 30 miles per hour (48 km/h). The locomotive overturned bodily and struck the vehicles of a milk train on the adjacent line. 28 people were killed. The driver was sober and normally reliable, but had not driven a non-stopping train through Salisbury before.

There have been several other derailments in the UK due to trains entering speed-restricted sections of track at excessive speed; the causes have generally been inattention by the driver due to alcohol, fatigue or other causes. Prominent cases were the Nuneaton rail crash in 1975 (temporary speed restriction in force due to trackwork, warning sign illumination failed), the Morpeth accident in 1984 (express passenger sleeping car train took 50 miles per hour (80 km/h) restricted sharp curve at full speed; alcohol a factor; no fatalities due to the improved crashworthiness of the vehicles)

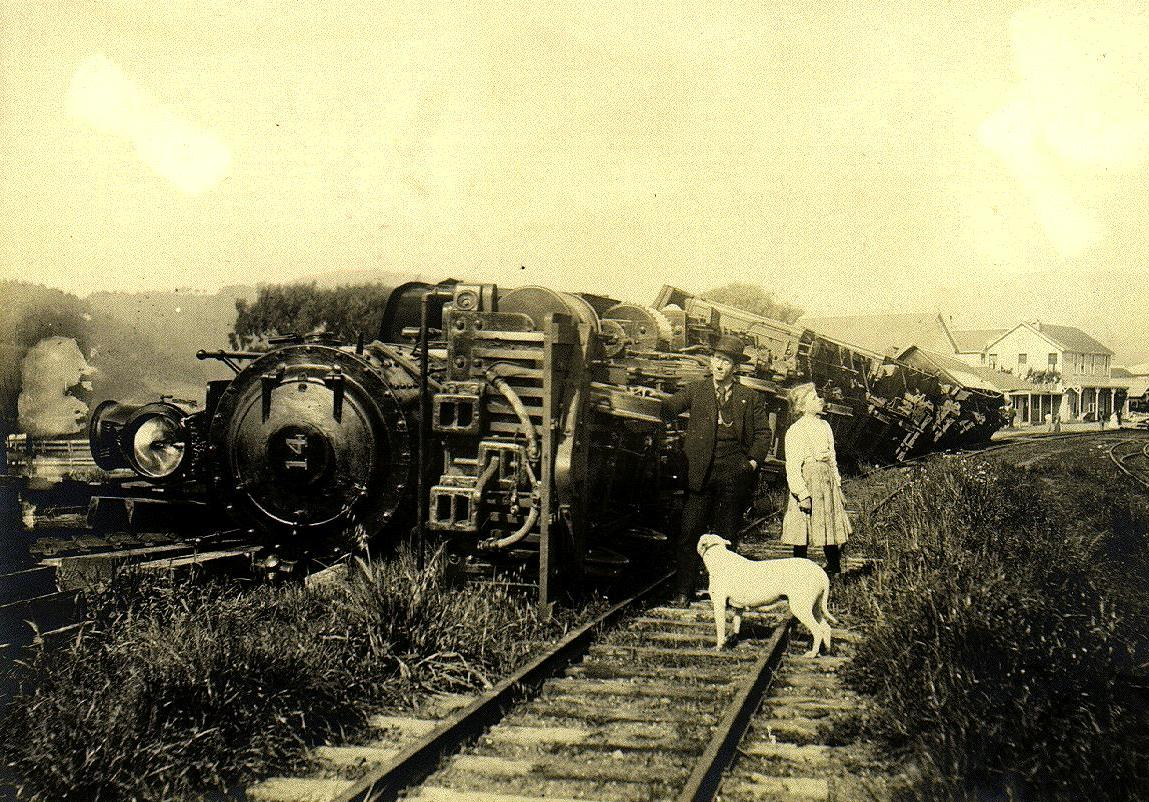
This locomotive was derailed by the 1906 San Francisco earthquake. The locomotive had three link and pin coupler pockets for moving standard and narrow gauge cars.

== See also ==
- Guard rails
- Lists of rail accidents
- Rail sabotage
- Train wreck
- Tram accident
