= 2015 Philadelphia train derailment =

Passenger rail crash in the United States

2015 Frankford Junction, Philadelphia train derailment
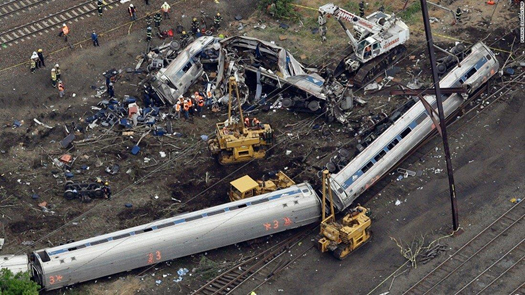
- Aerial view of the wreckage after the crash, showing the first three of the seven passenger cars.

- Location within Philadelphia Location within Pennsylvania Location within the United States

Details
- Date: May 12, 2015; 11 years ago 9:23 p.m. EDT (UTC−4)
- Location: Port Richmond, Philadelphia, Pennsylvania
- Coordinates: 40°00′06″N 75°05′37″W
- Line: Northeast Corridor
- Operator: Amtrak
- Incident type: Derailment
- Cause: Loss of situational awareness by train engineer

Statistics
- Trains: 1 (locomotive plus seven cars)
- Passengers: 238
- Crew: 5
- Deaths: 8
- Injured: 200+ (11 critical)
- Accused: Brandon Bostian
- Charges: Causing a catastrophe; Involuntary manslaughter (8 counts); Reckless endangerment (238 counts)
- Verdict: Not guilty on all counts

On May 12, 2015, an Amtrak Northeast Regional train from Washington, D.C., bound for New York City derailed and wrecked on the Northeast Corridor near the Port Richmond neighborhood of Philadelphia, Pennsylvania. Of the 238 passengers and five crew on board, eight were killed and over 200 were injured, with 11 critically so. The train was traveling at 102 miles per hour (164 km/h) in a 50 mph (80 km/h) zone of curved tracks when it derailed. The wreck was the deadliest on the Northeast Corridor since 1987, when 16 people died in a crash near Baltimore.

Some of the passengers had to be extricated from the wrecked cars. Many of the passengers and local residents helped first responders during the rescue operation. Five local hospitals treated the injured. The derailment disrupted train service for several days.

The National Transportation Safety Board determined that the derailment was caused by the train's engineer (driver) becoming distracted by other radio transmissions and losing situational awareness, and said that it would have been prevented by positive train control, a computerized speed-limiting system that was operational elsewhere on the Northeast Corridor, but whose activation at the wreck site had been delayed due to regulatory requirements. The track in question was also not equipped with ATC (automatic train control), an older and simpler system that had been operational for years on the southbound track of the curve at which the derailment occurred, and that also would have limited the train's speed entering the curve. Shortly after the derailment, Amtrak completed ATC installation on the northbound track.

The train engineer, 32-year-old Brandon Bostian, was arrested and charged with one count of causing a catastrophe, eight counts of involuntary manslaughter, and 238 counts of reckless endangerment. On March 4, 2022, a jury acquitted Bostian on all counts.

== Derailment ==
Map of the train's position following the derailment

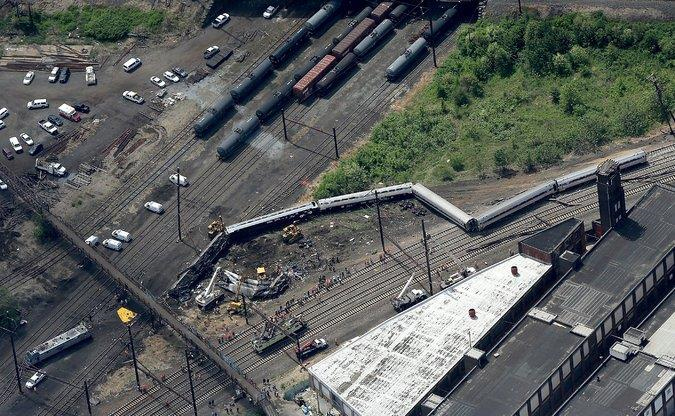
Aerial view of the derailed train

At about 9:10 p.m. (EDT) on Tuesday, May 12, 2015, Amtrak's northbound Northeast Regional No. 188 departed Philadelphia's 30th Street Station en route to New York City from Washington D.C. The train consisted of seven cars hauled by a year-old Amtrak Cities Sprinter (ACS)-64 locomotive, No. 601. The engineer was Brandon Bostian, who had begun working the route a few weeks prior.

The train entered a four-degree left curve on the four-track line at the railroad's Frankford Junction near the intersection of Frankford Avenue and Wheatsheaf Lane, where it derailed and wrecked at approximately 9:23 p.m.(EDT). Passengers reported that the front of the train shook at first, before coming to an abrupt stop. The entire train went off the track, with three cars rolling onto their sides. The train sustained at least $9.2 million in estimated damages.

The train should have been slowing to approach the curve with a reduced speed of 80 mph (130 km/h) during its approach, and 50 mph (80 km/h) within the curve itself, but instead, it had accelerated into the curve and was traveling at 106 mph (171 km/h) as its engineer applied the emergency brake, and 102 mph (164 km/h) when it derailed, according to Robert L. Sumwalt, the National Transportation Safety Board's lead investigator, who cited the onboard event recorder recovered from the wreckage. Transportation officials said the windshield of the locomotive may have been hit by a projectile shortly before the derailment.

Proponents argue the train should have been equipped with positive train control (PTC), which can automatically stop a train or slow it to a safe speed if the engineer fails to do so promptly. Amtrak officials said PTC had been installed on the tracks ahead of a Congress-mandated December 2015 deadline, but had yet to be operational due to "budgetary shortfalls, technical hurdles and bureaucratic rules". For four years, the railroad struggled with the FCC to purchase the rights to airwaves in the Northeast Corridor required for PTC, which might have limited the train's speed and thereby prevented the wreck. During a press conference, NTSB member Robert Sumwalt told reporters, "Based on what we know right now, we feel that had such a system been installed in this section of track, this accident would not have occurred." The track in question was not equipped with Automatic Train Control (ATC), which had been operational for years on the southbound track of the curve at which the derailment occurred, and which also would have limited the train's speed entering the curve. Shortly after the derailment, Amtrak completed ATC installation on the northbound track.

This fatal derailment was the second at Frankford Junction. On September 6, 1943, on the same tracks and within two blocks of the 2015 wreck site, an extra section of the Congressional Limited, then the Pennsylvania Railroad's premier Washington-to-New York service, derailed approaching the same curve en route to New York, killing 79 people and injuring 117 others.

== Immediate aftermath ==
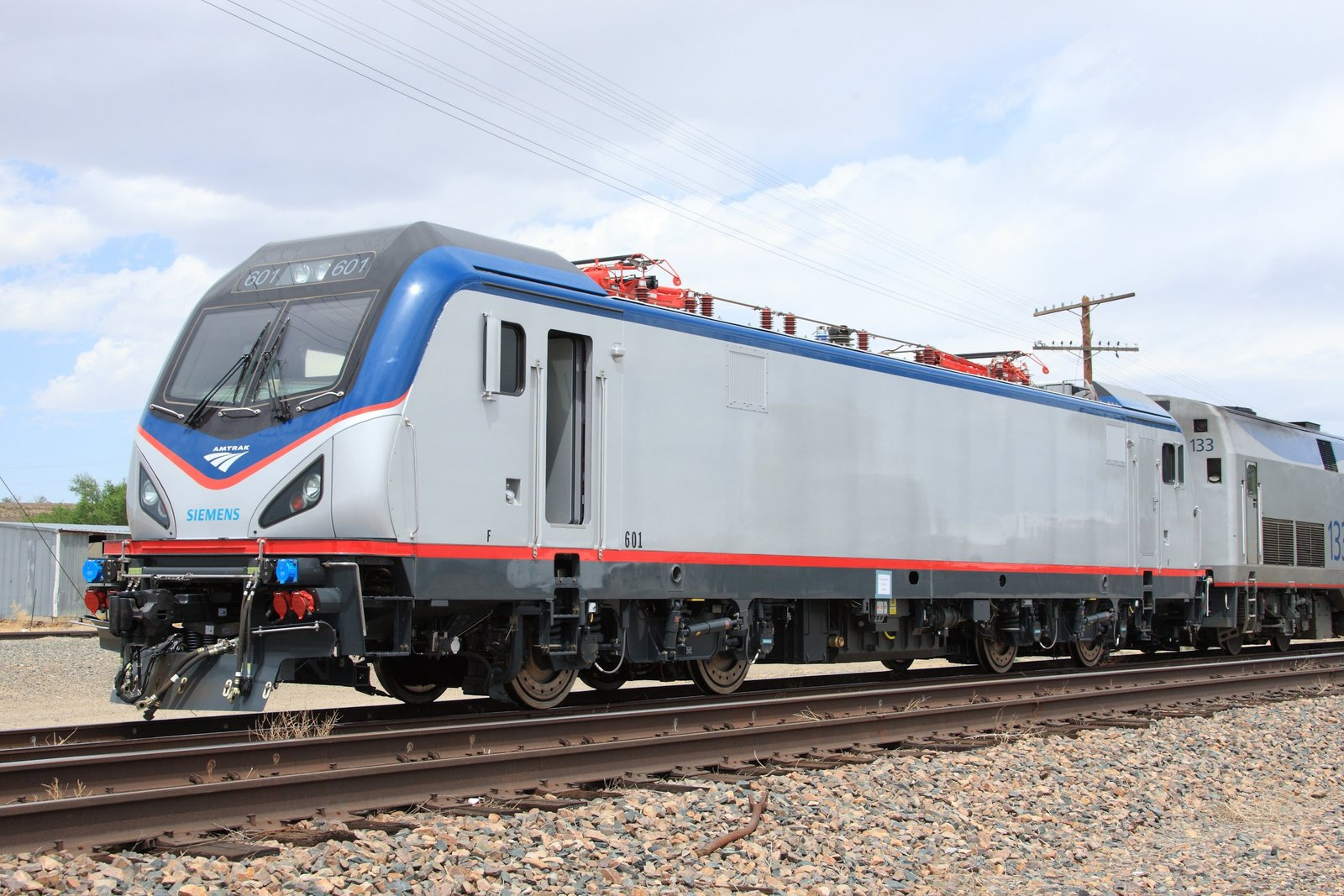
ACS-64 locomotive 601 led the train that derailed

Some passengers were able to walk off the train, while others needed to be rescued with cutting tools. Eventually, a crane was brought to the site to lift the overturned train cars, in part to search for trapped victims.

More than 200 passengers were treated at area hospitals, including Temple University Hospital, Aria Health, Hahnemann University Hospital, Jefferson University Hospital, and Einstein Medical Center. Most of the injured passengers sustained minor lacerations and contusions, while some also had fractured bones; 11 were critically injured. Bostian, the engineer, survived the wreck with leg injuries, a concussion, and a head wound.

Eight passengers died, including one at Temple University Hospital.

Former Congressman Patrick Murphy, who was a passenger on the train, said: "There was a lot of mayhem. A lot of blood, a lot of bleeding. I pulled myself up. The guy who I kind of landed on was OK. The guy next to him was completely passed out, knocked unconscious. People were pretty banged up." He said that after the train derailed, there were loud banging sounds and the train was shaking. Murphy, who sustained minor injuries in the wreck, helped other passengers leave the train. The man seated next to Murphy eventually regained consciousness, walked off the train, and helped other passengers. Delaware Senator Tom Carper had been on the same train, but got off at an earlier stop in Wilmington, Delaware. Chef Eli Kulp was among the badly injured passengers.

Paul Cheung, an Associated Press manager, was also on the train. He said that before the train derailed, it "started to decelerate, like someone had slammed the brake. Then suddenly you could see everything starting to shake. You could see people's stuff flying over me." Passenger Daniel Wetrin was taken to a nearby school after the wreck. He said, "I walked off as if, like, I was in a movie. There were people standing around, people with bloody faces ... power cables all buckled down as you stepped off the train." Another man took a cell phone video of the wreck's aftermath, in which rescuers are telling trapped passengers to crawl to safety, while other passengers cry and moan. One Port Richmond resident said the wreck felt like "a mild earthquake"; another said it "sounded like a bomb."

=== Mass transit adjustments ===
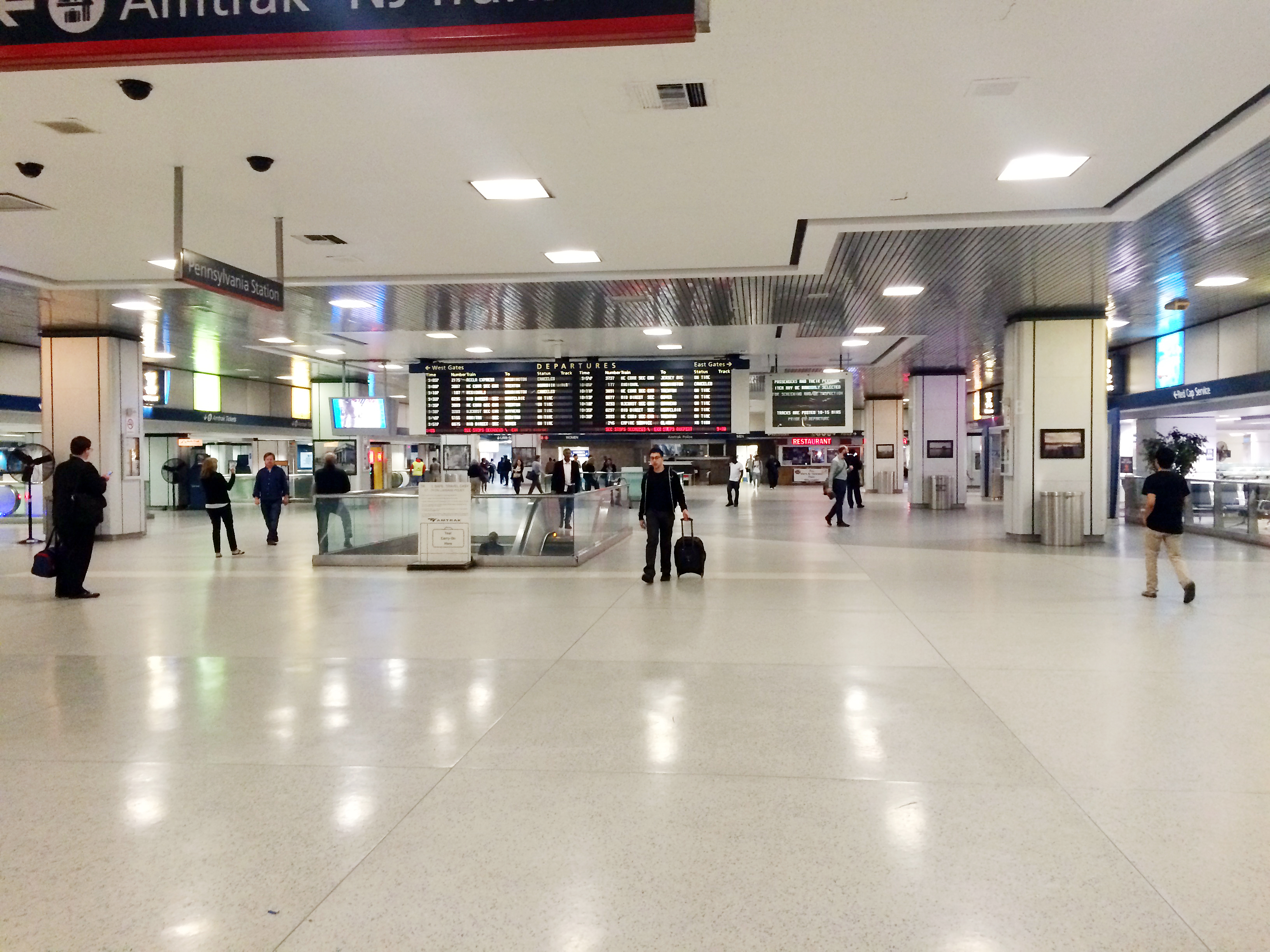
The virtually empty Amtrak waiting area of New York Penn Station on May 14 as dozens of trains were cancelled between Philadelphia and New York

- Amtrak service was suspended along the Northeast Corridor between New York City and Philadelphia. Service resumed on May 18, 2015.
- New Jersey Transit suspended service along the Atlantic City Line between Philadelphia and Cherry Hill. Service resumed on May 15, 2015.
- SEPTA Regional Rail service on the Trenton Line and Chestnut Hill West Line was also suspended. Service resumed on May 18, 2015.

=== Regulatory response ===
On May 19, 2015, the Federal Railroad Administration issued an emergency order to Amtrak related to the derailment. It required Amtrak to modify its automatic train control system to enforce the passenger train speed limit on the curve where the derailment occurred, while noting that Amtrak had already implemented the changes at the time of the order. It also required Amtrak to identify other curves on the Northeast Corridor with a more than 20 mph drop in the authorized approach speed and carry out similar changes, and install additional passenger-train speed-limit signage.

== Investigation and NTSB findings ==
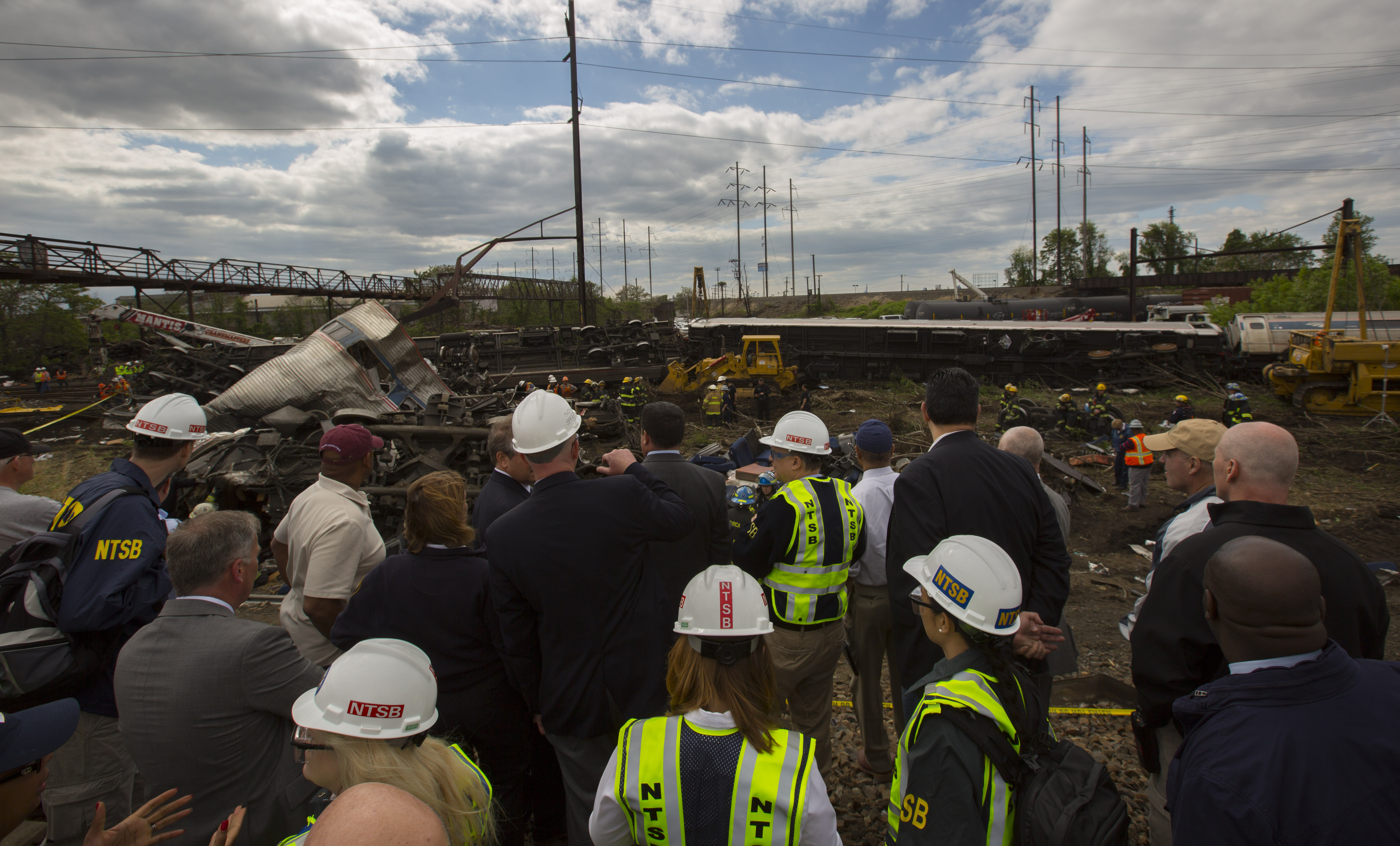
NTSB investigators arrive on the scene of the derailment

After an initial investigation of the scene, the Federal Bureau of Investigation (FBI) said there was no indication that the derailment was terrorism-related. An NTSB team also investigated. Preliminary information suggested that the derailment was accidental, according to informal statements made by both agencies, which continue to investigate. In early June authorities stated that they were still investigating the reason the train entered the curve while speeding. Investigators are focusing on why the train entered the curve too fast; it passed 70 mph (110 km/h) at 65 seconds before the wreck, 100 mph (160 km/h) just 16 seconds before, and the emergency brake was applied just seconds before the wreck. All of the locomotives' controls could only be manipulated manually by the engineer when it derailed. The engine was not aging equipment as it was only a year old and had no reported history of unintended acceleration. Bostian was not talking on the phone, texting or using smartphone data during the accident, nor was he using alcohol or drugs. The NTSB has told Congress that human error is a likely factor.

Bostian's lawyer said that his client does not recall much about the accident because of a concussion he sustained in the wreck, but that "he remembers coming into a curve. He remembers attempting to reduce speed and thereafter he was knocked out." The NTSB interviewed Bostian on May 15, who said he had "no recollection" of events after the train passed North Philadelphia station. Lead NTSB investigator Robert Sumwalt said Bostian was "extremely cooperative". Earlier, Sumwalt had said, "for somebody who's been through a traumatic event, this is not at all unusual for human behavior to have the mind blank out things like that, at least for the short term."

According to The New York Times Magazine, investigators focused on two possibilities: that a rock hit the windshield of the locomotive and caused Bostian to be distracted or disoriented, or that he mistakenly believed he was in a different curve. Both would result in Bostian losing situational awareness and allowing the train to enter the curve too fast.

At a hearing on May 17, 2016, the National Transportation Safety Board reported that the primary cause of the derailment was a loss of situational awareness by the train's operator, likely caused by distracting radio chatter from a nearby SEPTA train that had experienced an emergency situation. Someone had thrown a rock at the SEPTA train's windshield, shattering it and blinding the conductor. This distraction resulted in the operator believing he was further down the track than he was, thus accelerating the train before the curve rather than after it. The board concluded that the accident would have been entirely prevented if the line had been equipped with positive train control, which would have recognized and applied the appropriate speed limit, and chairman Christopher A. Hart called on federal railroad regulators to "end this list of PTC preventable fatalities and injuries right now."

== Response of politicians ==
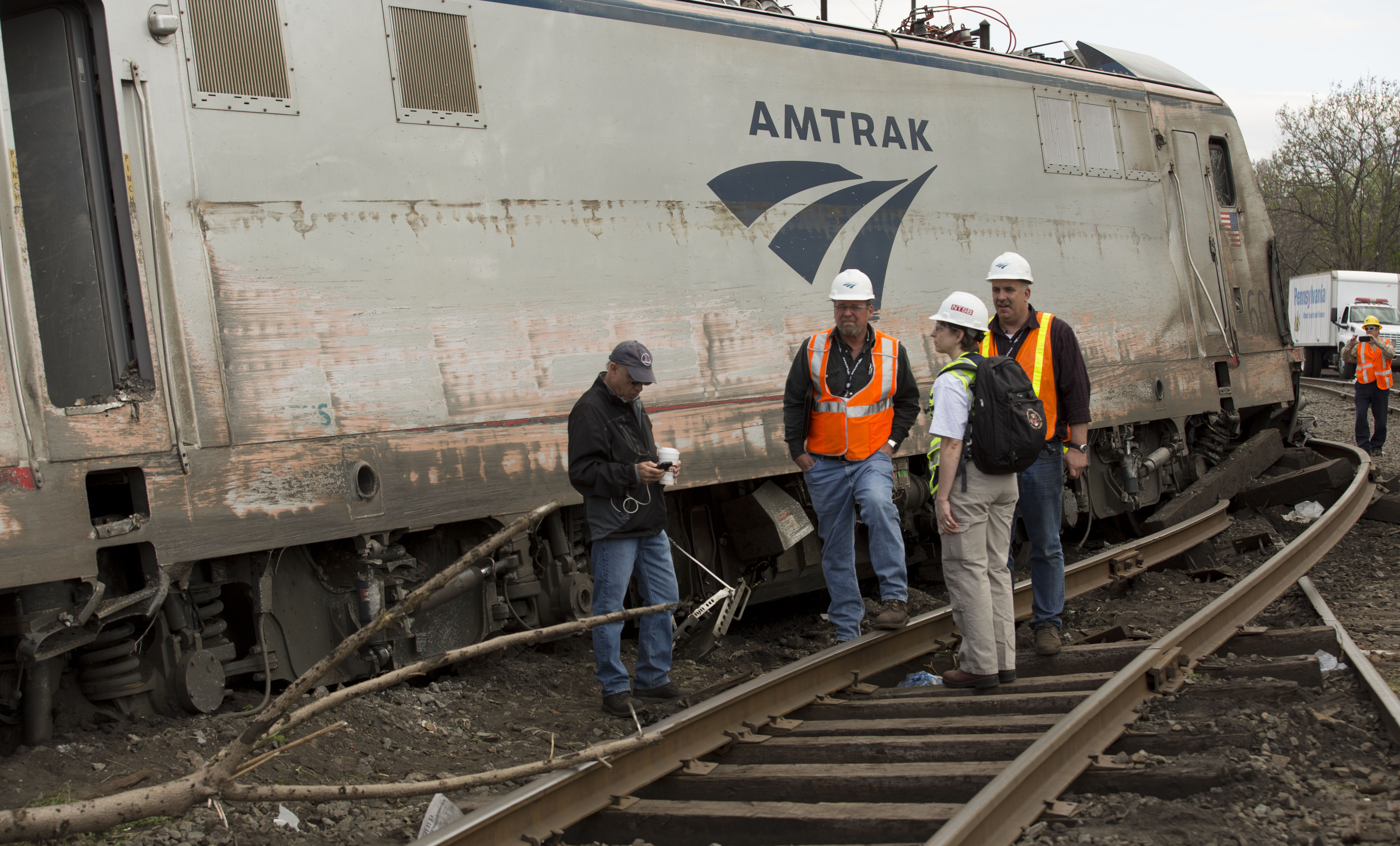
Investigators inspect the derailed locomotive

Philadelphia Mayor Michael Nutter said of the wreck, "It is an absolute disastrous mess." Pennsylvania Governor Tom Wolf said, "Anything that the state can do, we stand ready to do that." Amtrak was "deeply saddened by the loss of life from Amtrak Northeast Regional Train 188," according to a statement released on May 13. Vice President Joe Biden said, "Amtrak is like a second family to me, as it is for so many other passengers." He said he had taken about 8,000 Amtrak trips to and from Washington during his career.

President Barack Obama, in his statement following the accident, said:

Along with Americans across our country, Michelle and I were shocked and deeply saddened to hear of the derailment aboard Amtrak Train 188. Our thoughts and prayers go out to the families and friends of those we lost last night, and to the many passengers who today begin their long road to recovery. Along the Northeast Corridor, Amtrak is a way of life for many. From Washington, DC and Philadelphia to New York City, this is a tragedy that touches us all. As we work to determine exactly what happened, I commend the fire, police and medical personnel working tirelessly and professionally to save lives. Philadelphia is known as the city of brotherly love – a city of neighborhoods and neighbors – and that spirit of loving-kindness was reaffirmed last night, as hundreds of first responders and passengers lent a hand to their fellow human beings in need.

The day following the derailment, the U.S. House Appropriations Committee passed a measure to cut $260 million from Amtrak's $1.36 billion budget for the next fiscal year. Democrat Nita Lowey said, "While we don't know the cause of this accident, we do know that starving rail of funding will not enable safer train travel." In the same meeting, some Republicans criticized Democrats for linking the budget to the wreck. Idaho Rep. Mike Simpson admonished the Democrats for taking advantage of the situation, saying, "Don't use this tragedy in that way. It was beneath you."

== Resulting changes ==
As a result of the derailment and in particular the inability of the engineer to remember the wreck, Amtrak installed inward-facing cameras in its locomotives in 2015 and 2016, recording the actions of engineers before any future accidents. Amtrak completed installation of the ACSES positive train control system on the entire Northeast Corridor between Washington and Boston in December 2015.

Locomotive No. 601 was damaged beyond repair, and as of July 2023 is currently being used as a source for spare parts for other ACS-64s.

== Litigation ==
While § 161(a) of the Amtrak Reform and Accountability Act of 1997 (ARAA) capped the total liability (including for punitive damages) of Amtrak and all other defendants in any single passenger train accident at $200 million, a Bill (S. 1360) introduced by US Senator Bill Nelson (D-FL) on May 18, 2015, would if passed raise that limit to $500 million retroactive to May 12, 2015, the date of the Philadelphia derailment. If the ARAA imposed statutory liability limit proves insufficient to cover all damages and it is not raised by Congress, however, some plaintiffs' attorneys have already stated that the constitutionality of the $200 million cap would be challenged.

In early July 2015, both Amtrak and the plaintiffs, in the multiple federal civil lawsuits filed against Amtrak in U.S. District Courts in Pennsylvania, New York and New Jersey, requested that all then-existing and future such actions be transferred to and heard in the Eastern District of Pennsylvania (EDPA) in Philadelphia under the management of the Judicial Panel on Multidistrict Litigation (MDL) as provided for by 28 U.S.C. § 1407, creating a centralized process to considerably speed up litigation by conserving the resources of the parties and judiciary, avoiding duplication of discovery, and preventing inconsistent pretrial rulings. All the consolidated cases have been assigned to U.S. District Judge Legrome D. Davis. In answers filed by Amtrak with that Court on July 10, 2015, in response to the first two-passenger lawsuits the company admitted fault by stipulating as "true" that the train was "traveling in excess of the allowable speed" when it derailed and thus Amtrak "will not contest liability for compensatory damages proximately caused by the derailment of Train 188 on May 12, 2015".

On April 6, 2016, a Pennsylvania federal judge refused to grant settlement class certification to two passengers suing Amtrak over a train's derailment last year in Philadelphia, a ruling where damages capped at $295 million would likely be reduced in related multi-district litigation, according to plaintiffs' attorney Evan K. Aidman.

In October 2016, Amtrak reached a $265 million settlement with individuals affected by the derailment in 2015. This amount is in response to over 125 cases filed against Amtrak by passengers and family members, but can also be made available to passengers who had not yet filed a lawsuit or settled with Amtrak.

== Criminal investigation, charges, and acquittal ==
On May 9, 2017, Philadelphia prosecutors said Bostian, the train's engineer, would not face any criminal charges because there was no evidence that he had acted with criminal intent. On May 12, 2017, on the anniversary of the crash, Philadelphia Municipal Court Judge Marsha Neifield ordered prosecutors to file involuntary manslaughter and reckless endangerment charges against Bostian; the district attorney referred the matter to Pennsylvania Attorney General Josh Shapiro.

On May 18, 2017, Shapiro charged Bostian with eight counts of involuntary manslaughter, one count for each of those who died in the wreck; causing a catastrophe; and numerous counts of reckless endangerment. The charges were filed just before the two-year statute of limitations expired for the reckless-endangerment charges. On September 12, 2017, Philadelphia Municipal Court Judge Thomas Gehret dismissed all charges against Bostian, ruling after a preliminary hearing that the evidence did not support criminal charges and that the derailment was "more likely than not" an accident.

On February 6, 2018, following an appeal of Gehret's ruling by the Pennsylvania Attorney General's Office, Philadelphia Common Pleas Court Judge Kathryn Streeter Lewis reinstated all criminal charges against Bostian. On July 23, 2019, all charges were dismissed a second time, by Common Pleas Court Judge Barbara McDermott, who ruled that while Bostian made a mistake, his error was not a criminal act. On May 14, 2020, Superior Court Judge Victor Stabile reinstated charges on Bostian.

On March 4, 2022, a jury acquitted Bostian on all charges.

== See also ==
- 1943 Frankford Junction train wreck – accident that occurred in similar circumstances in almost the same location (Frankford Junction)
- Morpeth derailment (1969) – distracted driver fails to slow for tight curve in otherwise high-speed main line; subsequent introduction of warning system to announce major speed reductions.
- 2015 in rail transport
- History of rail transport in Philadelphia
- List of rail accidents (2010–2019)
