= 1943 Frankford Junction train wreck =

Pennsylvania Railroad disaster in Port Richmond, Pennsylvania, USA

Frankford Junction train wreck

Details
- Date: September 6, 1943; 6:06 p.m.
- Location: Frankford Junction, Pennsylvania
- Coordinates: 40.0018°N 75.1006°W
- Country: United States
- Line: Northeast Corridor
- Operator: Pennsylvania Railroad
- Incident type: Derailment
- Cause: Overheated journal box caused axle to break

Statistics
- Trains: 1
- Passengers: 541
- Deaths: 79
- Injured: 117

The Frankford Junction train wreck occurred on September 6, 1943, when one of the Pennsylvania Railroad's premier trains, the Congressional Limited, crashed at Frankford Junction in the Kensington neighborhood of Philadelphia, Pennsylvania, in the United States, killing 79 people and injuring 117 others.

== Train ==
Train consist
September 6, 1943
- Train: #152, Congressional
- PRR 4930 (class GG1); PRR 4706 coach; PRR 3854 coach; PRR 3940 coach; PRR 3751 coach; PRR 3971 coach; PRR 3861 coach; PRR 1860 coach; PRR 3941 coach; PRR 8023 lunch-counter-kitchen car; PRR 8024 Dining room car; Quaker Valley Pullman parlor car; Susan B. Anthony Pullman parlor car; Bay Head Pullman Parlor car; Richard Henry Lee Pullman parlor car; Willow River Pullman sleeping car; Alexander Hamilton parlor-lounge car

The Congressional Limited traveled between Washington, D.C., and New York City, normally making one stop in Newark, New Jersey, covering the 236 miles (380 km) in 3½ hours at speeds up to 80 mph (130 km/h), remarkable at the time. As it was Labor Day in 1943, the company laid on 16-car trains to accommodate the expected high demand. At Washington's Union Station on Monday, September 6, 541 passengers boarded the 4 p.m. train, its 16 cars hauled by PRR GG1 electric locomotive number 4930, scheduled to travel nonstop to Pennsylvania Station, New York.

== Incident ==
Everything appeared in order as the train passed through North Philadelphia station ahead of schedule and slowed its speed, but shortly afterward, as it passed a rail yard, workers noticed flames coming from a journal box (a hot box) on one of the cars and rang the next signal tower at Frankford Junction, but the call came too late. Before the tower man could react, disaster struck as the train passed his signal tower at 6:06 pm traveling at a speed of 56 mph. The journal box on the front of car No. 7 seized and an axle snapped, catching the underside of the truck and catapulting the car upwards. It struck a signal gantry, which peeled off its roof along the line of windows "like a can of sardines". Car No. 8 wrapped itself around the gantry upright in a figure U. The next six cars were scattered at odd angles over the tracks, and the last two cars remained undamaged, with bodies of the 79 dead lying scattered over the tracks. As it was wartime, many servicemen home on leave were aboard who helped the injured. Workers from the nearby Cramp's shipyard arrived with acetylene torches to cut open cars to rescue the injured, a process that took until the following morning. The rescue work was directed by Mayor Bernard Samuel. The work of removing the dead was not complete until 24 hours after the accident.

Among the survivors was Chinese author Lin Yutang.

== Inquiry ==
In total, 79 passengers died, all from cars No. 7 and No. 8, and 117 were injured, some seriously. The inquiry quickly established the overheated journal box as the cause of the accident, but railroad mechanics who had inspected and lubricated the box earlier that day swore it had been in good order. Normal practice was for signal towermen to watch passing train wheels for signs of problems and for train crew to look back as trains rounded curves. How this hot box escaped attention until too late has never been explained.

== Similar incidents ==
This was not the first railroad accident in which an overheated journal box caused an axle to break and derail a train. The first-ever train wreck involving passenger fatalities, the Hightstown rail accident of 1833, had an identical cause.

71 years and 8 months later, along the same location, an Amtrak train, speeding over 100 mph, derailed along the curve. The 2015 Philadelphia train derailment killed 8 and injured over 200.
