= Hightstown rail accident =

1833 railroad accident in New Jersey

Details
- Date: November 8, 1833; 192 years ago
- Location: Cranbury, New Jersey
- Coordinates: 40.26387°N 74.53331°W
- Country: United States
- Line: South Amboy to Bordentown
- Operator: Camden and Amboy Railroad
- Incident type: Derailment
- Cause: Hot box causing axle to break

Statistics
- Trains: 1
- Deaths: 2
- Injured: 21

The Hightstown rail accident occurred on the Camden and Amboy Railroad between Hightstown, New Jersey and Spotswood on November 8, 1833, just two months after horses were replaced by steam locomotives on the line. It is the earliest recorded train accident involving the death of passengers in America.

The train had been travelling from South Amboy to Bordentown at a speed of 35 mph (56 km/h), when, despite having stopped "to oil the wheels" and slowing to 20 mph (32 km/h), a journal box overheated (a condition known as hot box) and caught fire, causing an axle to break on one of the carriages, derailing and overturning it. All but one of the 24 passengers it carried were injured; one was killed outright and another died later from his injuries. Among the injured was Cornelius Vanderbilt, who broke a leg and vowed never to travel by train again, although he later broke his vow and eventually became a railway magnate, owning the New York Central Railroad, among others. Another passenger was Congressman and former US President John Quincy Adams, who escaped injury, but described the accident in his diary as "the most dreadful catastrophe that ever my eyes beheld". Irish actor Tyrone Power was also aboard the train and recorded the accident in his two-volume journal Impressions of America.

== Similar accidents ==
Over 100 years later in 1943, a broken axle caused by an overheated journal box caused a far greater loss of life when the Congressional Limited crashed in Philadelphia.
