= Mountain View station =

Mountain View station may refer to:

- Mountain View station (California)
- Mountain View station (NJ Transit), in New Jersey
- Mountain View station (Delaware, Lackawanna and Western Railroad), former station in New Jersey
