= River Street station (Erie Railroad) =

Former railway station in Paterson, New Jersey, US

River Street
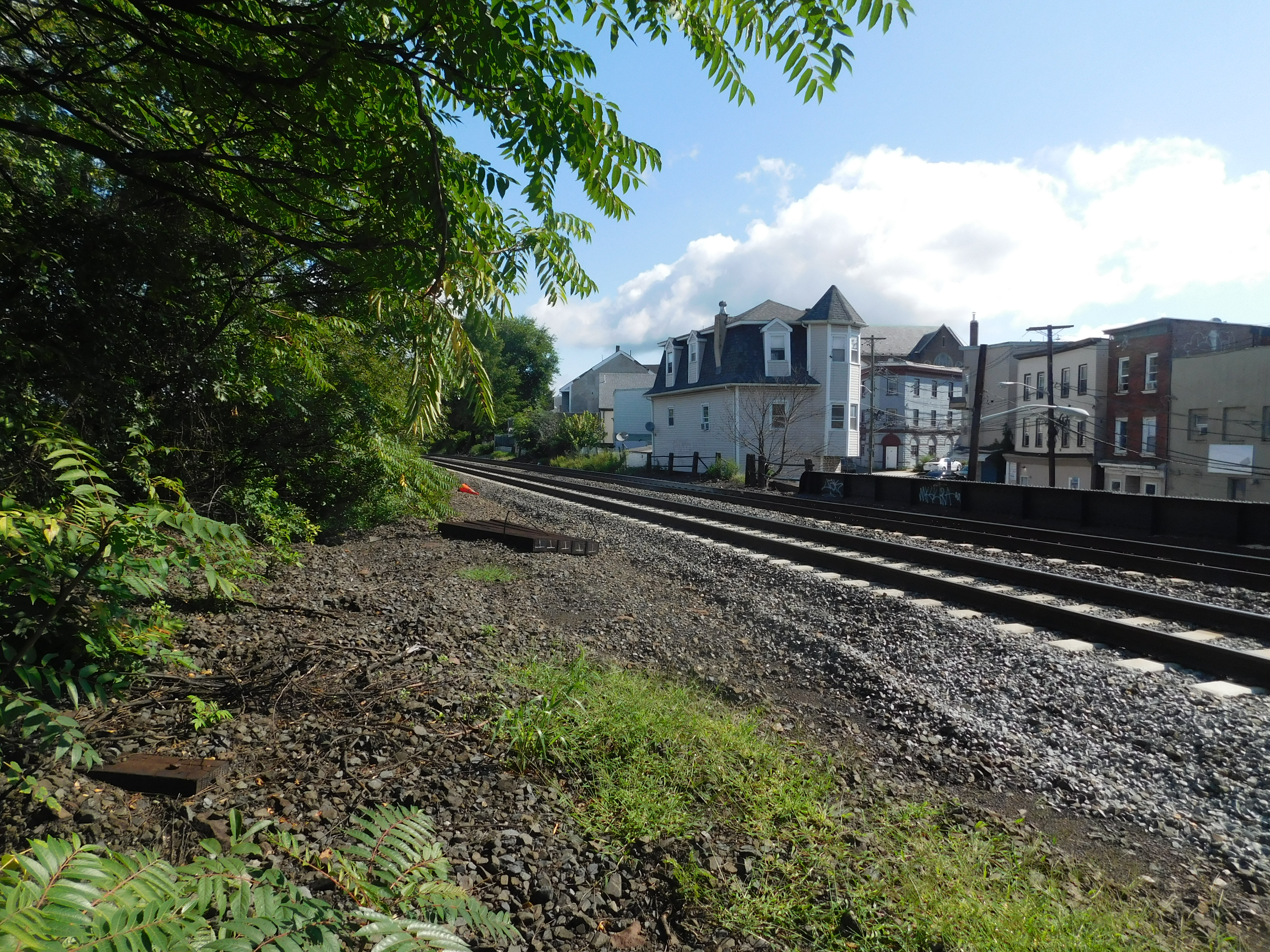
- The trackside location of the former River Street station in August 2026.

General information
- Location: River Street and Putnam Street, Paterson, New Jersey
- Coordinates: 40.9288°N 74.1624°W
- Owner: Erie Railroad (–1960); Erie-Lackawanna Railway (1960–1974)
- Lines: Erie Railroad Main Line (–1960); Erie Lackawanna Main Line (1960–1974)
- Tracks: 2 main line

Construction
- Platform levels: 1

Other information
- Station code: 2305

History
- Closed: c. August 25, 1974
- Rebuilt: October 1926–July 1928

Services
Preceding station	Erie Railroad	Following station
Hawthorne toward Ridgewood	Main Line local stops	Paterson toward Jersey City
Location

River Street station is a defunct commuter railroad station in the Bunker Hill section of Paterson, Passaic County, New Jersey. Located at the junction of Leon, Putnam and the eponymous River Street, the station served trains on the Erie Railroad's Main Line (New York Division) and the Erie Lackawanna Railroad's Main Line. The station stood at the northern end of a 445-foot (136 m) long steel trestle that replaced a grade crossing of River Street and Putnam Street. River Street station had two 1,000-foot (300 m) long side platforms, large enough to fit a twelve-car train at its peak.

The elevated River Street station opened in July 1928 as part of an elevation project of the Erie Railroad main line through the city, resulting in the demolition of the old station in October 1926. The new station was not the choice of the railroad, being forced by state agents to build despite lower ridership. The new station and the trestle cost the railroad and the city of Paterson over $300,000. The Erie Lackawanna Railroad reduced service at River Street station to one train a day in February 1973 before eliminating the stop altogether in August 1974.

== History ==
Following an accident at the Broadway grade crossing in 1910, officials in Paterson began plans to force the Erie Railroad to build a new alignment through the city. Early sketches were submitted on January 6, 1911 that would elevate the tracks through Paterson. The railroad asked the city to pay for one-third of the cost of the new alignment, but the city considered this unconstitutional and the project was halted. In March 1913, the city requested that the Board of Public Utility Commissioners order the railroad to build the grade elimination project proposed. After hearings held in 1913 and 1914, the Board agreed with the city and requested that the railroad follow plans submitted on May 21, 1914 by the city of Paterson. This would involve changing plans to cut costs.

After legal appeals by the railroad that went from the Supreme Court of New Jersey and Court of Errors and Appeals, all of which upheld the Board's decision making in 1916 and 1917, the railroad was denied by the Supreme Court of the United States in early 1921. During the design and appeal processes, an uptick in automobile traffic made the grade crossing issues worse. By July 1922, 61 main line trains ran from the Market Street station and Pavonia Terminal; 42 went to the Lake View station on Crooks Avenue and 46 stopped at the River Street station. At River Street station, an additional 21 trains also served the Newark Branch.

Due to geographical limitations at the site of River Street station, early 1913 survey work from the city and the railroad, it was determined that the railroad could not be depressed through the area. Sitting at 21.5 feet (6.6 m) above the level of the nearby Passaic River, the depression would have issues with the drainage into the river. River Street also could not be elevated over the tracks because of the amount of damage to the neighborhood it would cause to facilitate such a bridge. As a result, the accepted plan would be that the tracks be elevated over River Street by a bridge. The railroad also offered an alternative that would move the alignment of River Street 400 feet (120 m) to the north and keep the current grade through the area. Wait Street would also serve as the access ramp for this new bridge. This proposal was also declined due to the concern that it would damage the neighborhood's business potential by closing off River Street's present crossing. It would also add multiple sharp turns into the right-of-way and would require the acquisition of numerous properties. The study added that there was no plan for River Street that was not going to upset some part of the neighborhood.

At River Street, a new passenger station would be built under the railroad tracks due to the limited access of space. This new station would have 15-by-800-foot (4.6 m × 243.8 m) side platforms, accessible via stairs. There would be access points to these stairs at River Street and on Wait Street, adjacent to the north by 400 feet (120 m). A similar style of station was also proposed at the Lake View stop on Crooks Avenue. The freight station at River Street would be eliminated for the new construction. At the time, the freight depot was abandoned and all freight services related to River Street station was dealt with at carload lots. Due to the limited space with expansion from two to four tracks and necessary switches for local sidings, no new freight station would be built at the location. The report added that it would be in the best interest of all parties to buy a vacant property on Wait Street and use that for a new freight depot and/or yard.

River Street itself would be widened from 55 feet (17 m) to 60 feet (18 m) north of the railroad for a length of 700 feet (210 m). A new trestle would be built from Keen Street to the south end of the River Street station to allow the free flow of traffic on River Street.

The Erie Railroad and the city agreed on June 7, 1923 that the railroad would begin the grade crossing elimination project on May 15, 1924, starting with the section between Straight Street and Market Street. The project was broken down into four sections labeled A (Market Street to Lafayette Street), B (Keen Street to Warren Street), C (Straight Street to Market Street) and D (Madison Avenue). The project would begin with section C, followed by B, A and D, requiring an approval from the Board of Public Utility Commissioners. The project would have an enforced completion date of May 15, 1931, seven years to the day of starting and cost $3.555 million to construct. Work on the C section began as planned on May 15, 1924. In the contract, the construction would have to be finished by the summer in 1927. At that point, section B construction would begin, which involved eliminating the crossings at Keen, Putnam, Lafayette, Franklin, Montgomery and River Streets, to be finished by the fall of 1928.

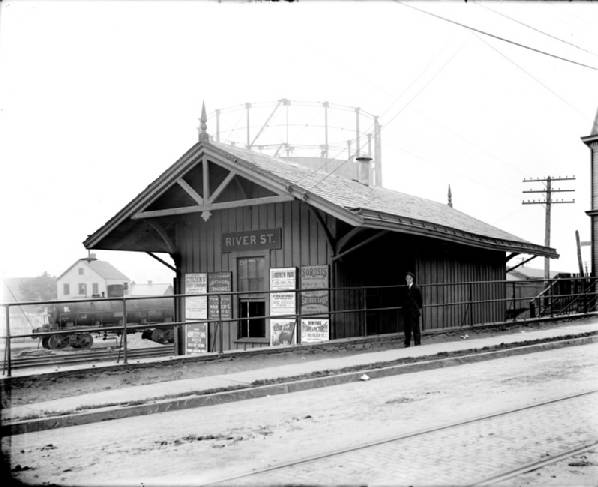
The original wooden station depot at River Street, c. December 1909

In July 1926, the railroad asked the city to pass a resolution authorizing a change to Section C that would adjust the Riverside area grade crossings, including River Street. This would involve changing the grade in which the railroad runs through the new crossings. With a new resolution, it would ensure construction would continue without interruption. By August 1926, official plans were complete for Keen, Montgomery, and Lafayette, while the general plans were finished for River and Warren Street crossings. Construction work from River Street to Sixth Avenue began on August 25 with the process of grading and filling the new alignment. The railroad announced that there was an agreement between the railroad and its contractors to speed up the section B process as much as possible so that the concrete work would be finished by the beginning of 1927.

By the end of September 1926, the embankment for the new tracks from River Street on north was ongoing. The sloping work along the eastern embankment was also near completion. In early October, the railroad officially abandoned the old River Street depot in order to facilitate construction of the new trestle that would cross River Street. With the impending demolition of the station, a new temporary railroad depot was placed on the west side of the tracks along Wait Street. At this point, the embankment for the new railroad alignment was also in place. Telephone ducts were also being lowered at River Street in order to facilitate construction.

The week of October 25, 1926 marked the beginning of construction on the northerly abutment of the new trestle at River Street. Crews finished the abutment by December 15. By mid-January 1927, eight piers for the new bridge were installed. The eastern retaining wall north of River Street was also in place and process on backfilling the structure had begun. Much of the concrete work on the new bridge, save for an abutment at Warren Street, was finished by early February.

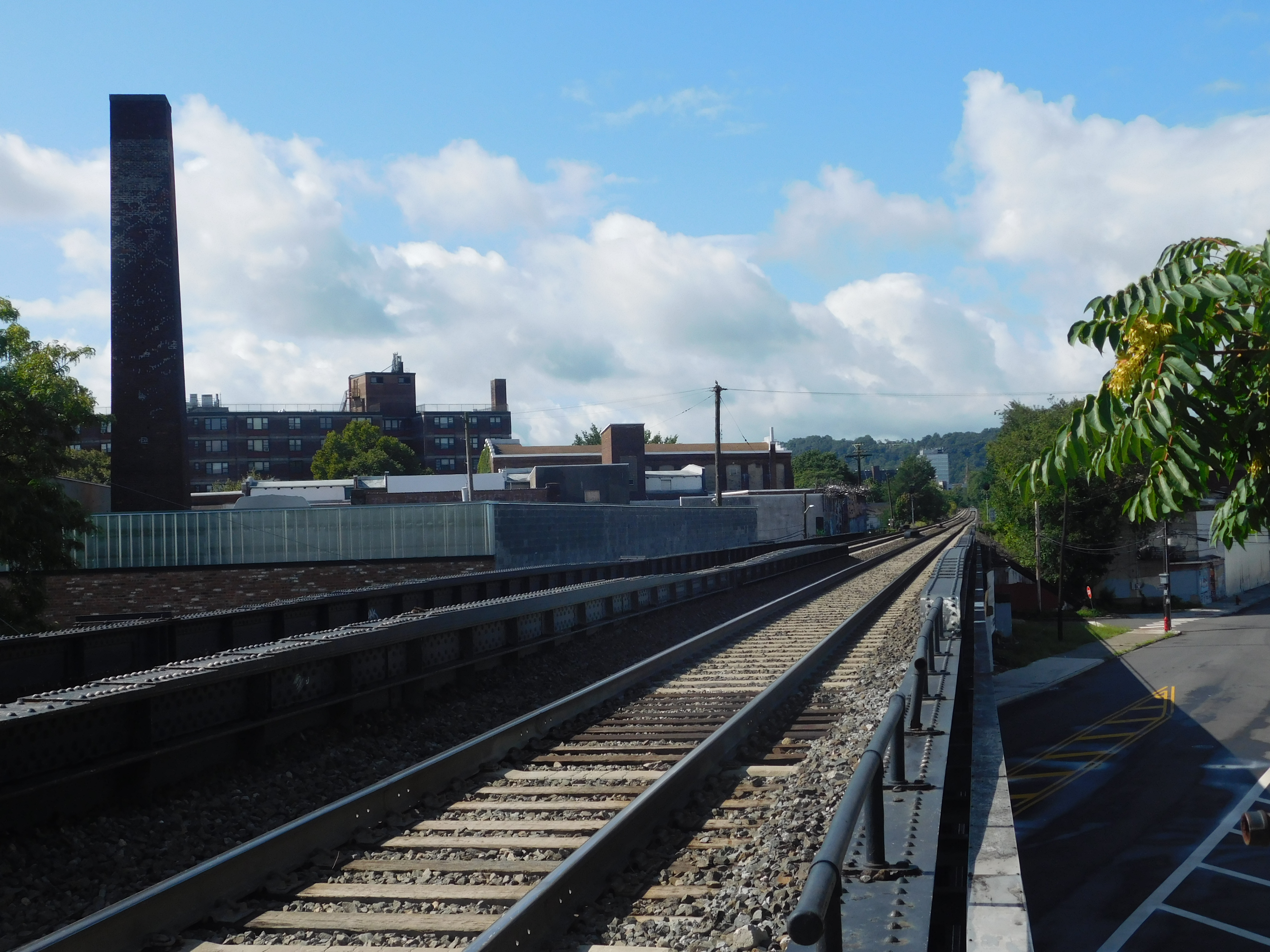
The 445-foot (136 m) bridge over River and Warren Streets, installed in 1927

The first section of the project, section C, was finished in April 1927 and progress was moved to begin the section A portion simultaneously with section B work. At that point, the railroad contractors acquired five cars of girders and fittings for the new viaduct and progress had begun on construction at the abutment at Warren Street. Excavation and curb construction on River Street was also underway, with the road in an unfinished state. The expectation was that new pavement would be installed on the road on April 28. By May 1927, four of the spans were in place of the new bridge and city engineer Harold J. Harder announced that in June, the railroad would begin operating over the new alignment, eliminating six grade crossings, including River Street. Harder added that the railroad and city have been prepared to help home and business owners affected by the re-design of River Street by updating their property at no cost to the building owner. At that time, River Street had new concrete pavement north of the Erie Railroad bridge and the curbs and basins were in place. The new trestle's girders, fittings and plates were all in place by June 9 with most of the rivet work complete. River Street had new sidewalks placed from the new bridge to Lyon Street. Rehabilitation work on local buildings had been underway, with one building (401 River Street) already complete. The Erie Railroad began operating trains on the new bridge on July 17, 1927, eliminating all the grade crossings in the area.

The Riverside Businessmen's Association filed a complaint on July 20 that the March 28 closure of the River Street crossing had caused them financial damages. Their complaint involved the fact that local business ladies were doing work with other firms on North Main Street rather than in the Riverside and Bunker Hill neighborhoods because of River Street being closed by a wooden fence the railroad installed. They felt that a wooden bridge over the tracks should have been installed on a temporary basis to ensure their ability to cross the railroad. They added that they felt the railroad was keeping the crossing shut to accommodate a local slaughterhouse near the River Street crossing, which had yet to get its own freight platform during the construction. The association felt that what the slaughterhouse received in preferential treatment should also go to all the other businesses in the area. The railroad responded that the expectation was that a new passageway would be in place by July 23 for people to cut through and that the old crossing site would be ready for pedestrian traffic the week after.

With the existing complaint, the progress of work at River Street was sped up by request. The crossing site reopened on July 22 instead of July 23 at half-width. At that time, new pavement construction would begin on each half of River Street so that the road would not be blocked again. All of the agreements with local building owners and were in place as well.

In January 1928, the Board of Public Utility Commissioners approved a request by the railroad and city to start construction of section D, the final section, on May 15 with the first three sections complete.

The railroad announced in July 1928 that the new station at River Street would open. The B section was declared complete by railroad and city officials on July 15, while a contract for section D would begin on August 1. At River Street, the new 445-foot (136 m) bridge was in place, which cost the railroad $135,000. The bridge involved six girders that were 132,000 pounds (60,000 kg) each and 84 feet (26 m) long. $85,000 was spent on the grade changes for River Street and the damage claims to property owners on River Street. $35,000 was also spent on the construction of River Street station's new eastbound platform. The new railroad depot, a stucco structure with maple floors and birch trim, would replace the temporary station installed in October 1926. The depot cost $12,000 on the foundation and $8,000 for the remaining structure. The platforms were 1,000 feet (300 m) long on each side, with modern lighting.

== See also ==
- Lake View station (Erie Railroad)

== Bibliography ==
- "Erie Completes Large Track Elevation Project Through Paterson, N.J." Railway Age. 93 (7). Philadelphia, Pennsylvania: Simmons-Boardman Publishing Company: 217–220. 1932.
- "New York District". Erie Railroad Magazine. 25. New York, New York: Erie Railroad: 48–51. March 1929.
