= Clifton station (Erie Railroad) =

Train station in New Jersey, United States

Clifton
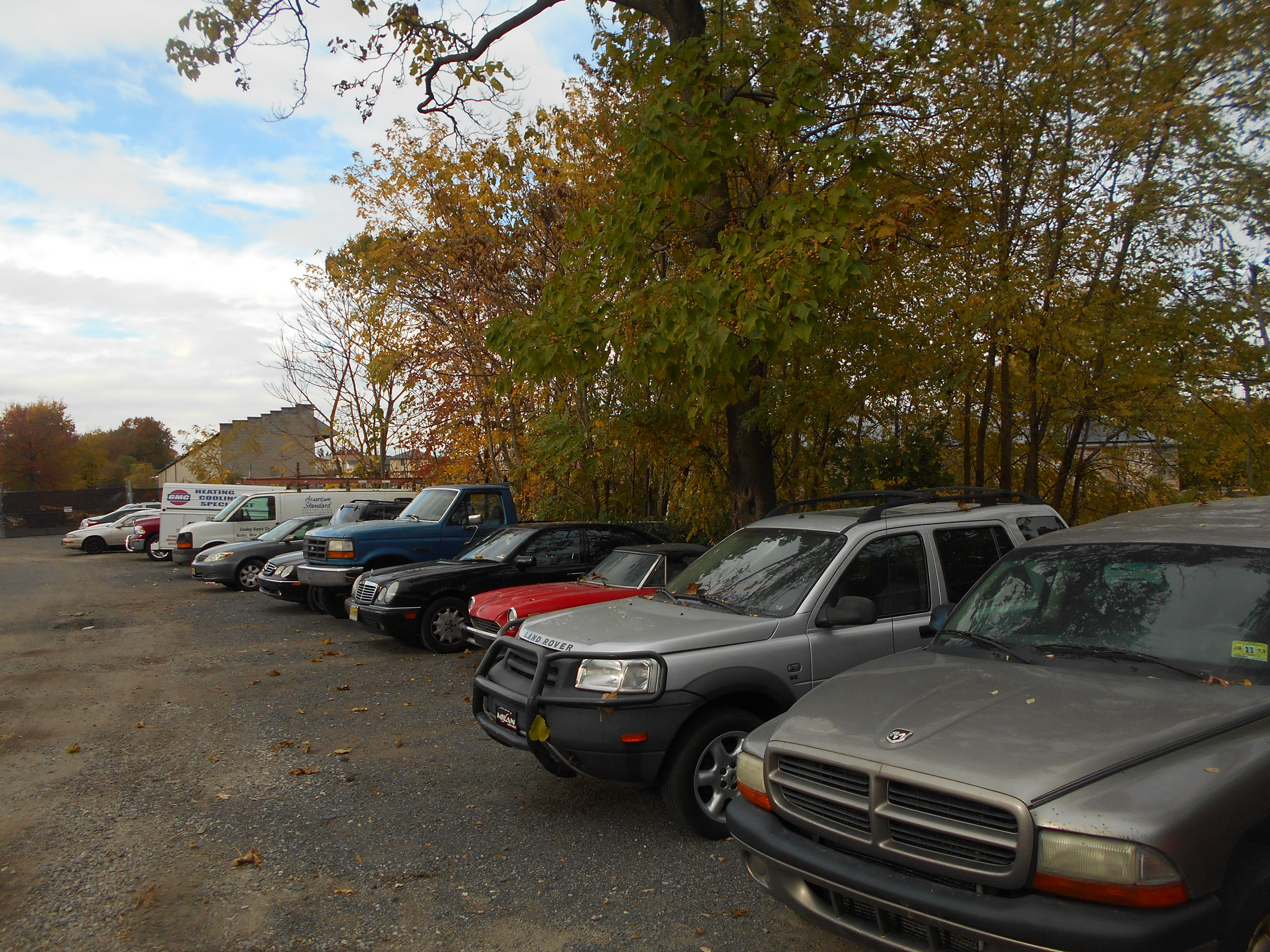
- The right-of-way north of the former Clifton station in October 2014, now the site of a parking lot for a business.

General information
- Location: Getty Avenue & Clifton Avenue, Clifton, New Jersey
- Coordinates: 40.8762°N 74.1370°W
- Owner: Erie Railroad (1883–1960); Erie Lackawanna Railway (1960–1963)
- Line: Erie Railroad Main Line
- Platforms: 2 side platforms
- Tracks: 2 main line

Construction
- Platform levels: 1

Other information
- Station code: 2135

History
- Closed: April 2, 1963
- Rebuilt: 1952–February 1953
- Former names: Ackerman's Lane

Key dates
- September 5, 1889: First depot caught fire
- November 12, 1899: Second depot caught fire
- April 22, 1952: Third depot caught fire

Former services
Preceding station	Erie Railroad	Following station
Lake View toward Ridgewood	Main Line local stops	Harrison Street toward Jersey City
Location

Clifton was a former train station for the Erie Railroad and Erie-Lackawanna Railroad in Clifton, Passaic County, New Jersey, United States. Located at the intersection of Getty Avenue and Clifton Avenue (County Route 611), the station served as part of the Main Line. The station consisted of tracks on an elevated line above Getty Avenue (since removed) with the 1952-built station depot on the side. After the closure of Harrison Street station, the station to the southeast was Passaic and the next station to the northwest was the Lake View station in nearby Paterson.

== History ==
Clifton station was constructed in 1889 and demolished in 1969.

=== Passaic plan ===
During the 1950s and 1960s, several different priorities from different agencies around the cities of Paterson and Passaic were beginning to form. The Delaware, Lackawanna and Western, a competing railroad with the Erie, wanted to condense (along with the Erie) services and share trackage because of financial troubles. Secondly, the city officials in Passaic had first brought a proposal to the Erie asking about the removal of the main line through the city, which was tying up traffic in the city during station stops. This, however, was not implemented during the 1950s, as proposed. Instead, the Erie reconstructed the stations at Passaic and Clifton. Third, the New Jersey State Highway Department needed rights-of-way for Interstate 80 through Paterson and State Route 21 through Passaic. The Passaic Park station and the BE Drawbridge needed to be demolished to build State Route 21.

After the merge on October 17, 1960, between the Delaware, Lackawanna and Western and the Erie, the city officials in Passaic once again brought back the possibility of removing the tracks through Main Street, Passaic. This time, the newly formed Erie Lackawanna Railway went forward with it, beginning the process to move its main line onto the former Boonton Branch through Lyndhurst, Passaic and Clifton. In 1962, the state Public Utility Commission approved the removal of the tracks. In April 1963 the last train passed through the station. The main line was abandoned past Carlton Hill, and BE Drawbridge was swung in the open position, and soon put up for sale price of $0.00 in 1964 by the mayor of Passaic.

== See also ==
- List of Erie Railroad structures documented by the Historic American Engineering Record

== Bibliography ==
- Scott, William Winfield (1922). History of Passaic and Its Environs Volume 2. New York, New York: Lewis Publishing Company.
