= Delawanna station =

NJ Transit rail station

Delawanna
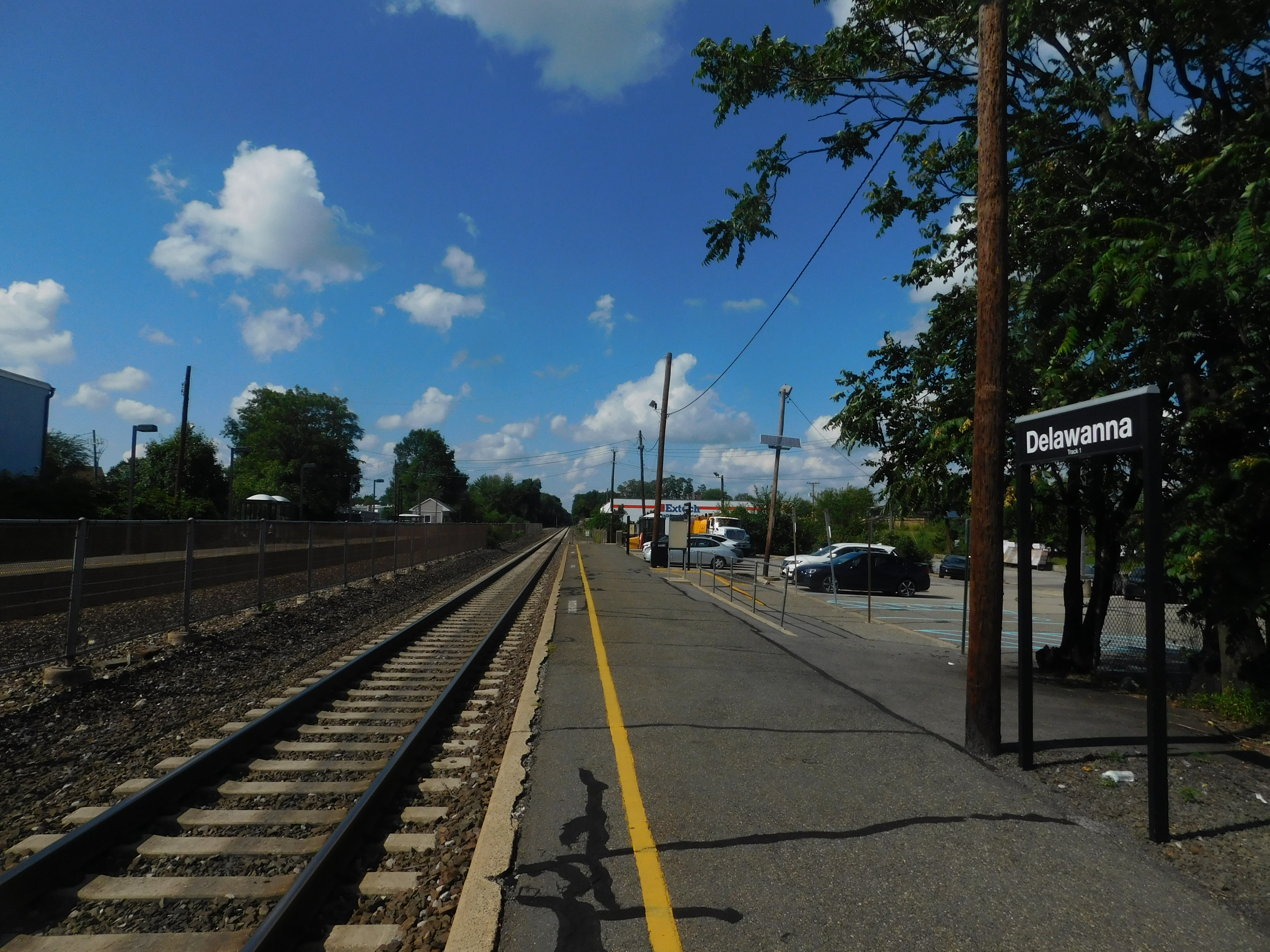
- Delawanna station in August 2026.

General information
- Location: Delawanna Avenue at Oak Street, Clifton, New Jersey
- Coordinates: 40.8317°N 74.1314°W
- Owner: NJ Transit
- Platforms: 2 side platforms
- Tracks: 2
- Connections: NJT Bus: 27, 74, 190

Construction
- Parking: 142 spaces

Other information
- Fare zone: 3

History
- Opened: September 12, 1870 (freight service); December 14, 1870 (passenger service)
- Rebuilt: 1925

Key dates
- May 4, 1970: Westbound station razed

Passengers
- 2025: 397 (average weekday)
- Rank: 72 of 153

Services
Preceding station	NJ Transit	Following station
Passaic toward Suffern	Main Line	Lyndhurst toward Hoboken
Former services
Preceding station	Delaware, Lackawanna and Western Railroad	Following station
Passaic toward Dover	Boonton Branch	Lyndhurst toward Hoboken
Location

Delawanna is a commuter rail station for New Jersey Transit in the Delawanna section of Clifton, Passaic County, New Jersey. The station, located at the intersection of Delawanna Avenue (Passaic County Route 610) and Oak Street (Passaic County Route 605), serves trains on New Jersey Transit's Main Line, serving Hoboken Terminal on the east end and Suffern and Port Jervis stations on the west end in New York. Delawanna station has two low-level side platforms with a shelter on the inbound side, lacking access for the physically disabled under the Americans With Disabilities Act of 1990.

== History ==
=== Reconstruction (1924–1925) ===
At the end of July 1924, the Lackawanna announced that they were making preparations for the elimination of the grade crossing at Delawanna Avenue in Clifton. As part of the new grade crossing, the existing Delawanna depot would be eliminated and replaced with a new structure. The plans would also involve improving the grounds around the new station at Delawanna. The project would cost about $230,000 (1924 USD), with the railroad providing $200,000 of the cost, the Passaic County Board of Freeholders $20,000 and the municipality offering $7,000. The Board of Freeholders and officials for the city of Clifton agreed to build a new storm water drain for the new overpass and station. The construction span would involve 600 feet (180 m) of the railroad, which would now go over a concrete structure. The railroad purchased land near Oak Street for the new station, located near the former depot.

Clifton Mayor S. Grant Thorburn praised the new project and stated that the Delawanna Avenue crossing was one worthy of being upgraded from a grade crossing to an overpass. He used his press conference to denounce the Erie Railroad, which only had one eliminated grade crossing (Clifton Avenue) and would not eliminate the grade crossing at Piaget Avenue. At a council meeting on August 5, the city approved an authorization to have the City Engineer draw up an ordinance to widen Delawanna Avenue as part of the construction. This would also include building sewers and lights on the new structure. Thorburn and his colleagues announced that they struck an agreement with the railroad on August 19, 1924. The city would spend $25,000 in support of the project. They passed an ordinance that would also change the elevation on Oak Street to help facilitate construction.

In October 1924, the railroad announced they were in struggle to get the land necessary for the new station depot. Colonel Charles Johnson of Oak Street owned a 6,375-square-foot (592.3 m^{2}) property that the railroad wanted to condemn. Due to Johnson's opposition, the railroad petitioned the New Jersey Supreme Court via its clerk in Paterson. On November 1, Judge Charles C. Black in Paterson announced that a new panel, made of three locals would be in charge of deciding what to do with the Johnson property. A hearing was held at Clifton City Hall on November 25 to determine what to do about the Johnson property. The railroad and its attorneys stated that they offered $3,500 for the property while the colonel requested $18,000. Several witnesses were called on both sides of the table. The three-man panel stated that they would write a report for Judge Black, who would determine what the Johnsons would get for the property. The Lackawanna's attorneys also noted that the railroad had begun preliminary construction of the new overpass.

During the week of December 8, full construction of the project began, with Delawanna Avenue and Brook Avenue closed. Franklin Avenue would reduced to one-way traffic. The Public Service Corporation pulled up its northbound tracks on Franklin Avenue to help facilitate construction, reducing that to one track operating both directions. Brook and Franklin would have their bridges widened to accommodate four tracks on the line. At that time, construction of the station depot began next to the older structure. At the time, the projection was the station and new overpass would be finished by June 1925. By December 23, Oak Street had been torn up and Delawanna Avenue was being prepared for excavation to build the new bridge. The Freeholders in February 1925 noted that they were unsure they had actually formed an agreement with the city of Clifton over the storm water work and by February 26, the county agreed to go ahead with work on the new storm drain and pave Delawanna Avenue. The railroad, concerned that any delays would delay the contractor building the new overpass and station, pressured the county to move with the construction.

By August 1925, the new bridge was finished and opened to the public with all four tracks. However, despite the bridge being complete, the new station at Delawanna was not finished.

== Station layout ==
The station has two tracks, each with a low-level side platform; the lone ticket vending machine is located on the Hoboken-bound platform. A large parking lot is available on Delawanna Avenue for riders.

== Bibliography ==
- Lyon, Isaac S. (1873). Historical Discourse on Boonton, Delivered Before the Citizens of Boonton at Washington Hall, on the Evenings of September 21 and 28, and October 5, 1867. Newark, New Jersey: The Daily Journal Office.
- Taber, Thomas Townsend; Taber, Thomas Townsend III (1981). The Delaware, Lackawanna & Western Railroad in the Twentieth Century. Vol. 2. Muncy, PA: Privately printed. ISBN 0-9603398-3-3.
