= Towaco station =

NJ Transit rail station

Towaco
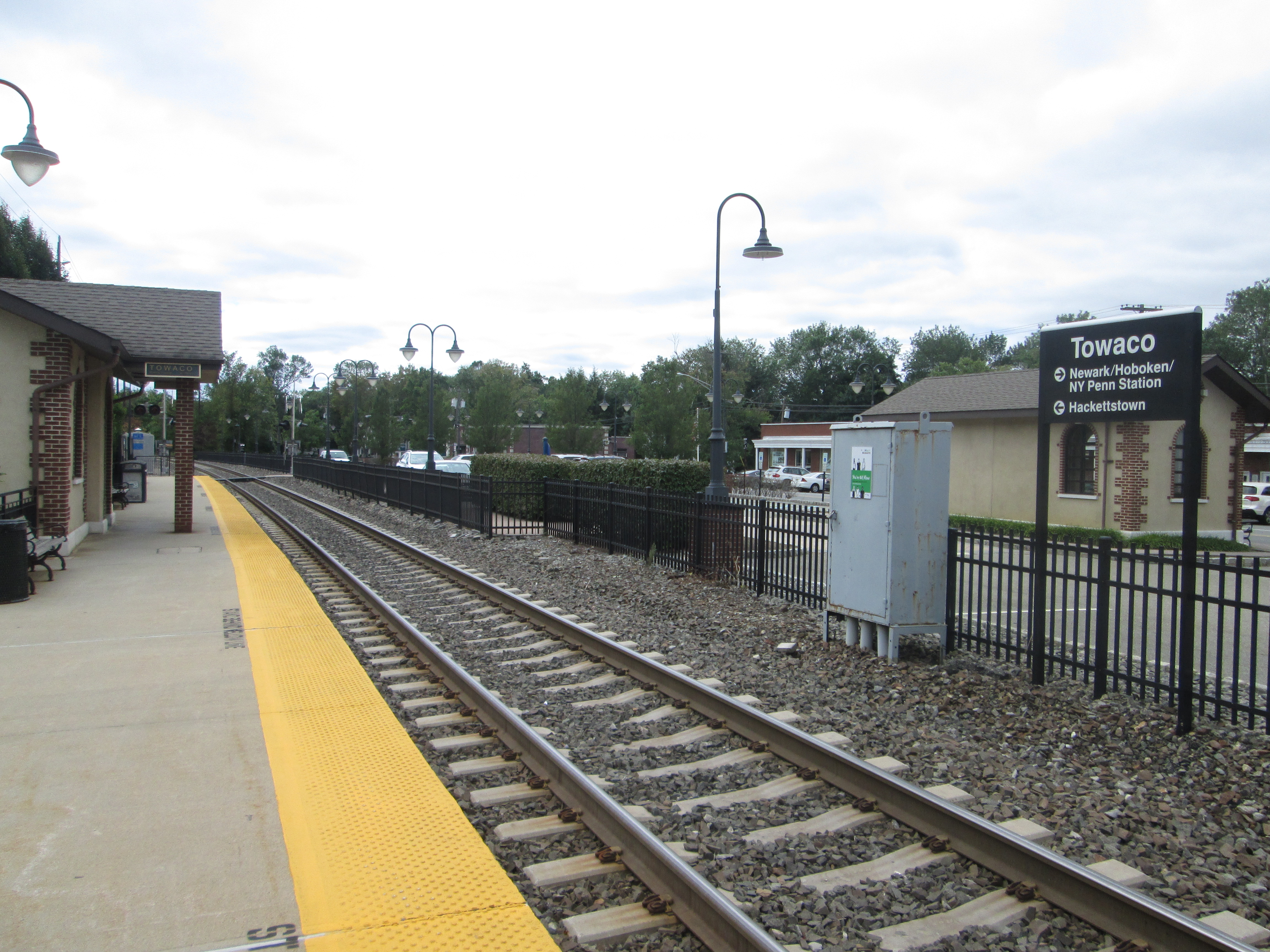
- The Towaco station platform in September 2013, facing eastbound along the Montclair–Boonton Line. The shelter for buses can be seen to the right.

General information
- Coordinates: 40.9230°N 74.3434°W
- Owner: NJ Transit
- Platforms: 1 side platform
- Tracks: 1
- Connections: NJT Bus: 871; Lakeland: 46 (limited Lakeland service)

Construction
- Accessible: yes

Other information
- Fare zone: 11

History
- Opened: September 12, 1870 (freight service); December 14, 1870 (passenger service)
- Rebuilt: 1910–1911, 2000
- Former names: Whitehall (–1905)

Passengers
- 2025: 55 (average weekday)
- Rank: 139 of 153

Services
Preceding station	NJ Transit	Following station
Boonton toward Hackettstown	Montclair–Boonton Line limited service	Lincoln Park toward New York or Hoboken
Former services
Preceding station	Delaware, Lackawanna and Western Railroad	Following station
Montville toward Dover	Boonton Branch	Lincoln Park toward Hoboken
Location

Towaco is a station on NJ Transit's Montclair–Boonton Line located between U.S. Route 202 and Whitehall Road in the eponymous neighborhood of Montville Township, Morris County, New Jersey. The station opened as Whitehall in 1870 along the Boonton Branch of the Delaware, Lackawanna and Western Railroad, and assumed its current name in 1905.

== History ==
The station was first opened by the Delaware, Lackawanna and Western Railroad as Whitehall. Renamed to Towaco in 1905, a new depot was built in 1924 by the railroad with help from architect F.G. Neiss. The depot replaced one built in the 1910s and demolished in 1970. NJ Transit rebuilt the structure in 2000.

== Station layout ==
The station has a single side platform on a single track, facing eastward. There are also two parking lots with 220 spots for free use. There is also a 600-square-foot (56 m^{2}) brick shelter on the platform.

== Bibliography ==
- Florio, Patricia (2017). Images of America: Montville Township: Celebrating 150 Years. Mount Pleasant, South Carolina: Arcadia Publishing. ISBN 9781467126403.
- Lyon, Isaac S. (1873). Historical Discourse on Boonton, Delivered Before the Citizens of Boonton at Washington Hall, on the Evenings of September 21 and 28, and October 5, 1867. Newark, New Jersey: The Daily Journal Office.
