= Passaic station (NJ Transit) =

NJ Transit rail station

Passaic
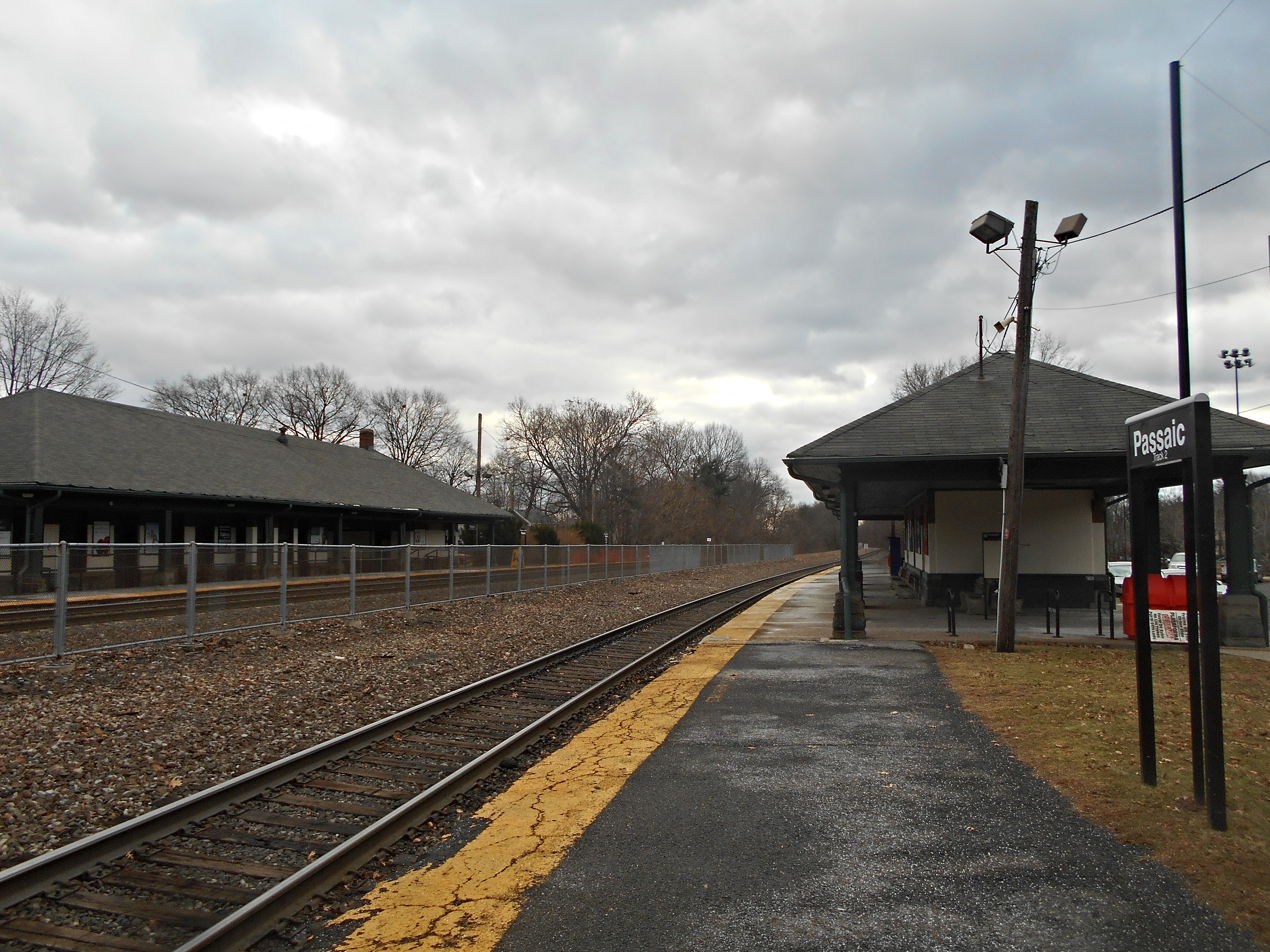
- The Hoboken-bound platform at Passaic station in January 2015.

General information
- Location: Lackawanna Place at Barry Place, Passaic, New Jersey
- Coordinates: 40.8494°N 74.1337°W
- Owner: NJ Transit
- Platforms: 2 side platforms
- Tracks: 2
- Connections: NJT Bus: 190, 702

Construction
- Parking: 108 spaces

Other information
- Fare zone: 4

History
- Opened: September 12, 1870 (freight service); December 14, 1870 (passenger service)
- Rebuilt: August 16, 1900–June 26, 1901

Key dates
- April 1958: Station agent eliminated

Passengers
- 2025: 362 (average weekday)
- Rank: 75 of 153

Services
Preceding station	NJ Transit	Following station
Clifton toward Suffern	Main Line	Delawanna toward Hoboken
Former services
Preceding station	Delaware, Lackawanna and Western Railroad	Following station
Clifton toward Dover	Boonton Branch	Delawanna toward Hoboken
Location

Passaic is an NJ Transit rail station served by Main Line trains in Passaic, New Jersey. The station is located in the Passaic Park section of Passaic at an intersection that links Passaic Avenue and Van Houten Avenue with Lackawanna Place. The Hoboken bound platform is located on the Passaic Avenue side of the station and the Suffern bound platform is located at the intersection of Van Houten Avenue and Lackawanna Place. Pedestrian access to both platforms is available on Passaic Avenue, but an underpass is also available to connect both sides. Connecting transportation includes limited service of NJ Transit 190D and 190E at Van Houten Avenue / Barry Place. Additionally, NJ Transit 702 bus (which operates Monday - Saturday between Bloomfield, New Jersey and Elmwood Park NJ stops one block away at Passaic Avenue and Ascension Street.

== History ==
The Boonton Branch of the Delaware, Lackawanna and Western Railroad was first constructed as a freight bypass of the Morris & Essex Railroad in 1868. This was constructed due to the lack of suitability for freight along its passenger lines (due to curves and inclines) and stretched from the Denville station to Hoboken Terminal via Boonton and Paterson. Freight service began on September 12, 1870, while passenger service began on December 14, 1870.

== Station layout ==
The station has two tracks, each with a low-level side platform. There are two parking lots, one on either side of the station, and an underpass between platforms. Rita's Italian Ice was opened in the station building located on the outbound track to Suffern in early 2026.

== Bibliography ==
- Lyon, Isaac S. (1873). Historical Discourse on Boonton, Delivered Before the Citizens of Boonton at Washington Hall, on the Evenings of September 21 and 28, and October 5, 1867. Newark, New Jersey: The Daily Journal Office.
