= Paterson station =

NJ Transit rail station

Paterson
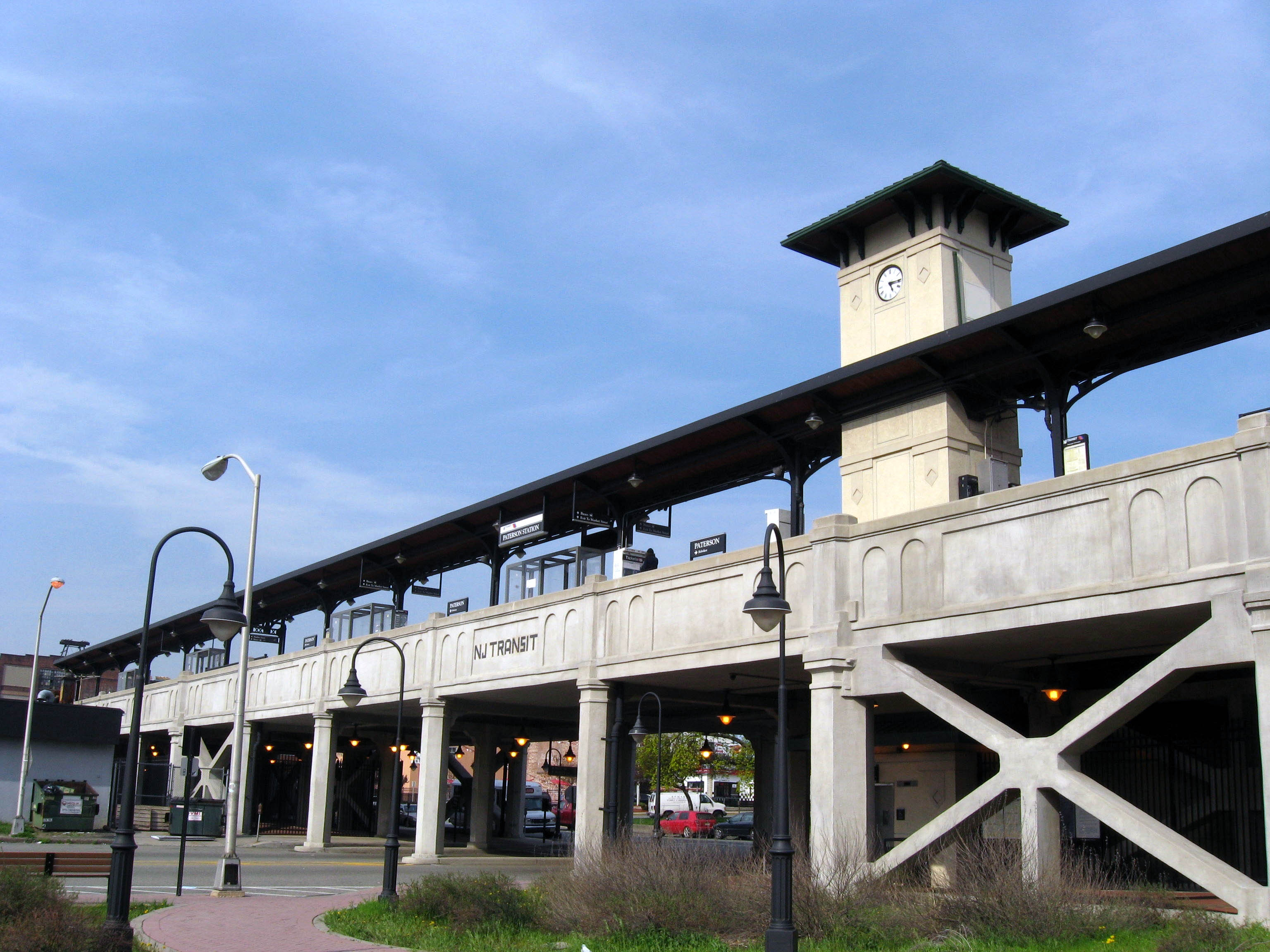
- Paterson station seen from street level

General information
- Location: Crosby Place at Market Street and Ward Street, Paterson, New Jersey
- Coordinates: 40.9146°N 74.1673°W
- Owner: New Jersey Transit
- Platforms: 1 island platform
- Tracks: 2
- Connections: NJT Bus: 161, 703, 707, 712, 744, 746, 748

Construction
- Parking: 124 spaces
- Accessible: yes

Other information
- Station code: 2303 (Erie Railroad)
- Fare zone: 6

History
- Opened: May 28, 1832
- Rebuilt: 1924–30; August 10, 1950; 2001

Key dates
- October 19, 1848: Paterson and Ramapo Railroad opened

Passengers
- 2025: 512 (average weekday)
- Rank: 57 of 153

Services
Preceding station	NJ Transit	Following station
Hawthorne toward Suffern	Main Line	Clifton toward Hoboken
Former services
Preceding station	NJ Transit	Following station
Hawthorne toward Suffern	Main Line until October 27, 1986	South Paterson toward Hoboken
Preceding station	Erie Railroad	Following station
Ridgewood toward Chicago	Main Line	Passaic toward Jersey City
River Street toward Ridgewood	Main Line local stops	Lake View toward Jersey City
Terminus	Newark Branch	South Paterson toward Jersey City
Location

Paterson station is an active commuter railroad station in the eponymous city of Paterson, Passaic County, New Jersey. Located on an elevated concrete viaduct over Ward Street and Market Street in Paterson, the station serves trains of NJ Transit's Main Line, which operates between Hoboken Terminal in Hoboken, New Jersey and Suffern station in Suffern, New York. Paterson station contains a single island platform to service the two tracks that operate along the viaduct. The station has a single parking lot at the intersection of Ward Street and Dale Avenue with 697 spaces, operated by the Paterson Parking Authority on a daily and permitted basis.

Railroad service through the area began with the construction of the Paterson and Hudson River Railroad, which opened between Rutherford (then known as Boiling Springs) and Paterson on May 28, 1832. Service to Suffern began on October 19, 1848 when the Paterson and Ramapo Railroad opened from Paterson. The station's elevated viaduct was built by the Erie Railroad from 1924–1930.

== History ==
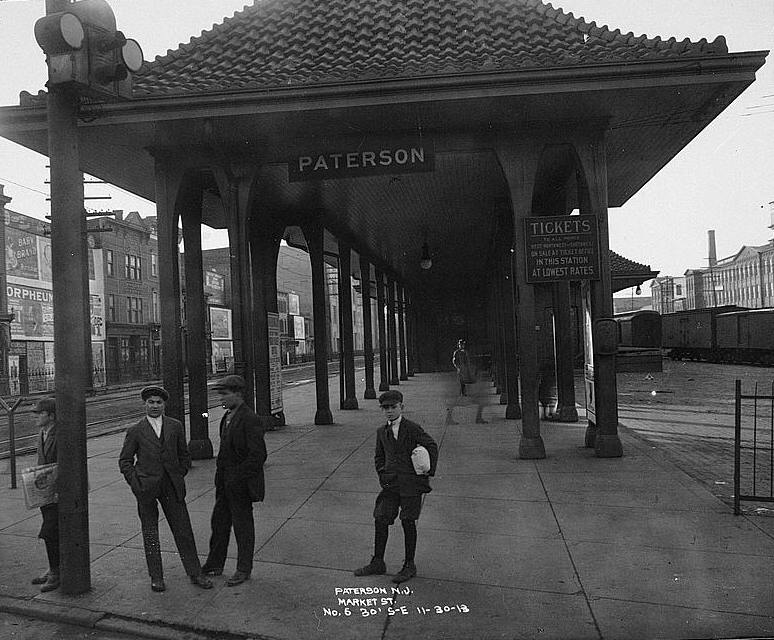
The former Paterson station of the Erie Railroad on November 30, 1913, prior to the track elevation

Paterson station has always only served one railroad line: the Main Line of the Erie Railroad, along with its successors, the main lines of the Erie-Lackawanna Railroad (EL), Conrail legacy EL division (operated under NJDOT), and finally the present-day New Jersey Transit Main Line. However, the Main Line itself has changed substantially over the years, leading to significant changes in usage, destinations, and connections.

Originally a single track at grade, the elevated station was built between 1924 and 1930 when the Erie Railroad eliminated street level crossings on its Main Line in Paterson. The Erie Main Line ran from Jersey City to Chicago via Binghamton and Jamestown, New York, Akron and Marion, Ohio, with major branches to Buffalo and Cleveland.

Major long-distance passenger and freight trains passed through this section of track, and many of those passenger trains stopped at Paterson. The Erie Limited and the Lake Cities served passengers heading toward Chicago. The station received eastbound passengers from the Atlantic Express. This situation was stable from the inception of the station until the early 1960s, when the Erie Railroad was in major financial difficulties.

Due to the financial issues, the Erie merged with the Lackawanna in 1960, to form the Erie-Lackawanna Railroad, or EL. The EL immediately looked to reduce costs by eliminating redundant lines and consolidating passenger train routes. The Erie Limited and the Lake Cities were rerouted away from Paterson and instead over the Lackawanna main line through northwest New Jersey and the Poconos. The #21 train made a stop en route to Binghamton, where passengers could switch to the Phoebe Snow after a layover. The discontinuing of the Atlantic Express (1965) marked the end of direct long-distance passenger service through Paterson. The #21/22 Hoboken-Binghamton trains continued another year to connect to the Phoebe Snow in Binghamton.

Serendipitously, four government agencies had been developing plans that, to succeed, required changes or destruction to sections of the Erie Main Line:

- The city of Passaic wish to remove the Main Line grade trackage from the city's primary business district. There was no viable rerouting available pre-merger, and so negotiations never went through.
- Further east along the line, the state of New Jersey wished to extend State Route 21, but the Main Line was in the way, including its bridge over the Passaic River. Once more, the Erie had no viable options for rerouting the Main Line
- In Paterson itself, the state and Federal governments wished to use the Lackawanna Boonton Branch right of way at Garret Mountain to build what would become Interstate 80. This would have required difficult rerouting of that line for the Lackawanna Railroad.

With the 1960 EL merger, the legacy Lackawanna lines were now available to create a new Main Line, and the legacy Erie lines were available to create new routes for the Boonton line. Acceding to the above government requests became possible, with the triple benefit of removing government pressure, eliminating redundancy in the lines and schedules, and reducing costs for maintenance, capital, and taxes with the abandonment or sale of rights of way. The Route 21 and downtown Passaic plans required severing the entire Passaic portion of the Main Line, and stranded adjacent sections in Clifton, and Paterson and beyond. Included in this stranded section was the Paterson station.

To fix this problem, a connection from the Boonton Branch was built. This allowed the Main Line to realign on a parallel route, with minimal construction, running trains from Hoboken (instead of Jersey City) through the Boonton Branch stations that had previously provided minor competition to the Erie stations. Once these trains reached Paterson, they used the new connection to continue on the original Main Line tracks, including service to Paterson Station. The connection was single-tracked for many years, but double-tracked in 2002. The remainder of the Boonton Branch, also severed at I-80, was realigned to continue on the old Erie Greenwood Lake Branch.

The EL went bankrupt in the early 1970s. Conrail took over its operations, but the Main Line did not fit Conrail's plans, since the realignments were much less efficient than the original Main Line and Boonton Branch for straight freight traffic. The severing of various freight lines and the new connections required to create a contiguous east–west line through New Jersey to Pennsylvania was circuitous and involved fairly steep ruling grades. As a result, Conrail wished to abandon all freight operations on the former E-L lines. The State of New Jersey agreed to take over the "E-L" commuter lines from Conrail. The Main Line saw little to no freight traffic after this transfer. Some maps still list the trackage as Conrail or Erie-Lackawanna.

== Station layout ==
The Paterson station consists of a high-level island platform spanning from Market Street to Ward Street in downtown Paterson. Handicapped passengers must access the station via an elevator located on Ward Street.

The station is located in an area of Paterson near Center City Mall, the Passaic County Courthouse and county government offices, and the Paterson campus of Passaic County Community College where several city and county roads intersect with Market and Ward Streets.

The station now only serves commuter traffic, with no full service/long-distance passenger traffic. It has direct service to Hoboken over the current Main Line, over the legacy Boonton Branch connection mentioned above. Heading north, service goes to Port Jervis and Suffern, a joint service of New Jersey Transit and Metro-North Railroad.

Previously, service ran through to the Erie Pavonia Terminal in Jersey City, and to locations in New York state, Northwestern Pennsylvania, Ohio, Indiana and Chicago via the Main Line and various branches. This included both commuter and conventional passenger trains.

In addition, for a brief period after the Main/Boonton realignment, additional service along the Newark Branch was available from Paterson, through Clifton, Nutley, Belleville, northern Newark, and then going east through Kearny. EL abandoned that branch in 1966.

== See also ==
- List of Erie Railroad structures documented by the Historic American Engineering Record
