= Lyndhurst station =

NJ Transit rail station

Lyndhurst
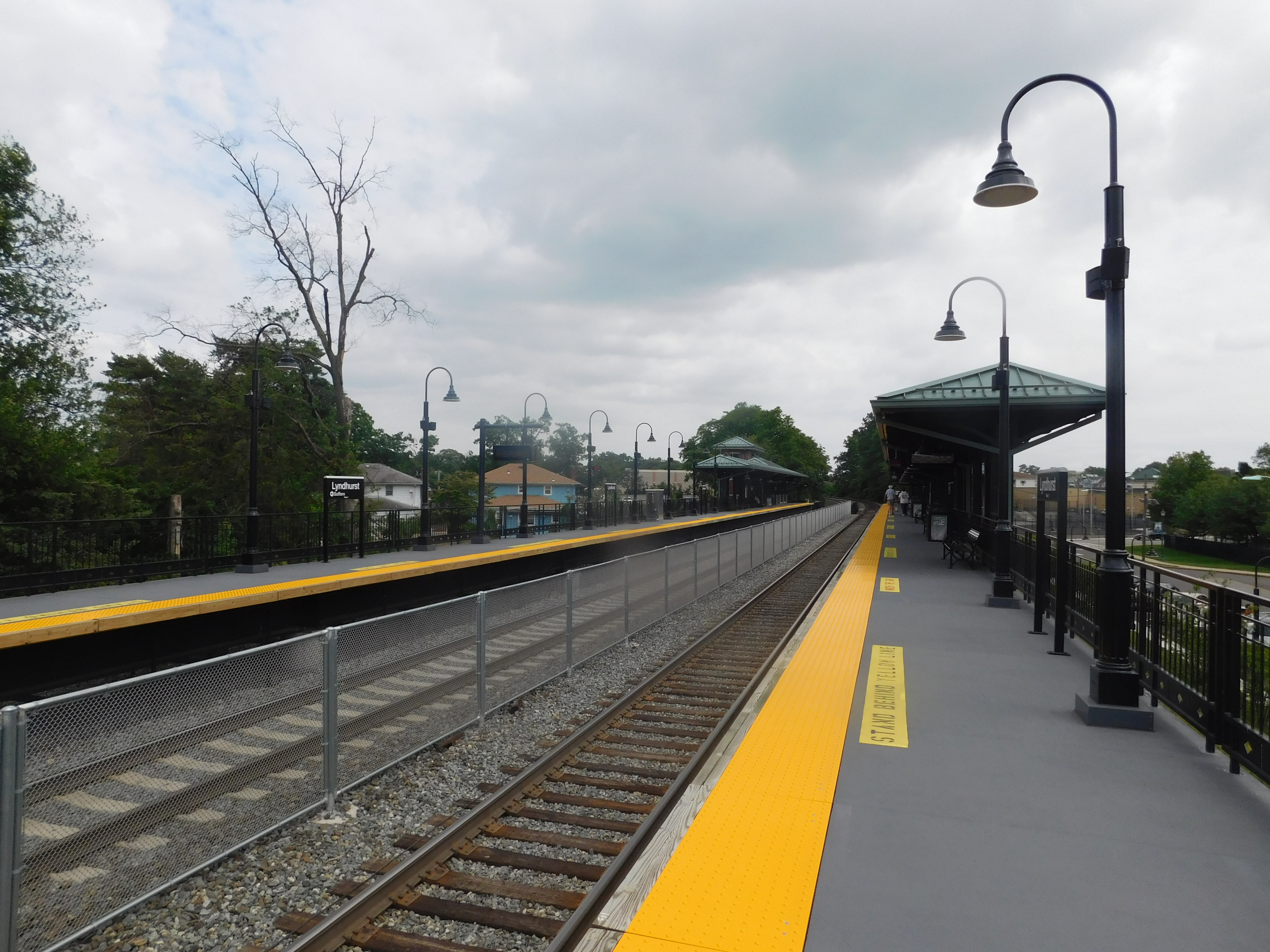
- Lyndhurst station on June 8, 2025, the day the new station opened.

General information
- Coordinates: 40.8163°N 74.1242°W
- Owner: NJ Transit
- Platforms: 2 side platforms
- Tracks: 2

Construction
- Parking: 572 spaces
- Accessible: yes

Other information
- Fare zone: 2

History
- Opened: September 12, 1870 (freight service); December 14, 1870 (passenger service)
- Rebuilt: 1928; April 30, 2021–June 8, 2025

Key dates
- November 30, 1972: Northern station depot razed

Passengers
- 2025: 473 (average weekday)
- Rank: 60 of 153

Services
Preceding station	NJ Transit	Following station
Delawanna toward Suffern	Main Line	Secaucus Junction toward Hoboken
Former services
Preceding station	NJ Transit	Following station
Delawanna toward Suffern	Main Line	Kingsland Closed 2025 toward Hoboken
Preceding station	Delaware, Lackawanna and Western Railroad	Following station
Delawanna toward Dover	Boonton Branch	Kingsland toward Hoboken
Location

Lyndhurst is a NJ Transit rail station located in Lyndhurst, New Jersey on the Main Line. The current station building opened on June 8, 2025, replacing the previous building located a block away. Upon the opening of the current station, the nearby Kingsland station, also in Lyndhurst, closed permanently.

== History ==
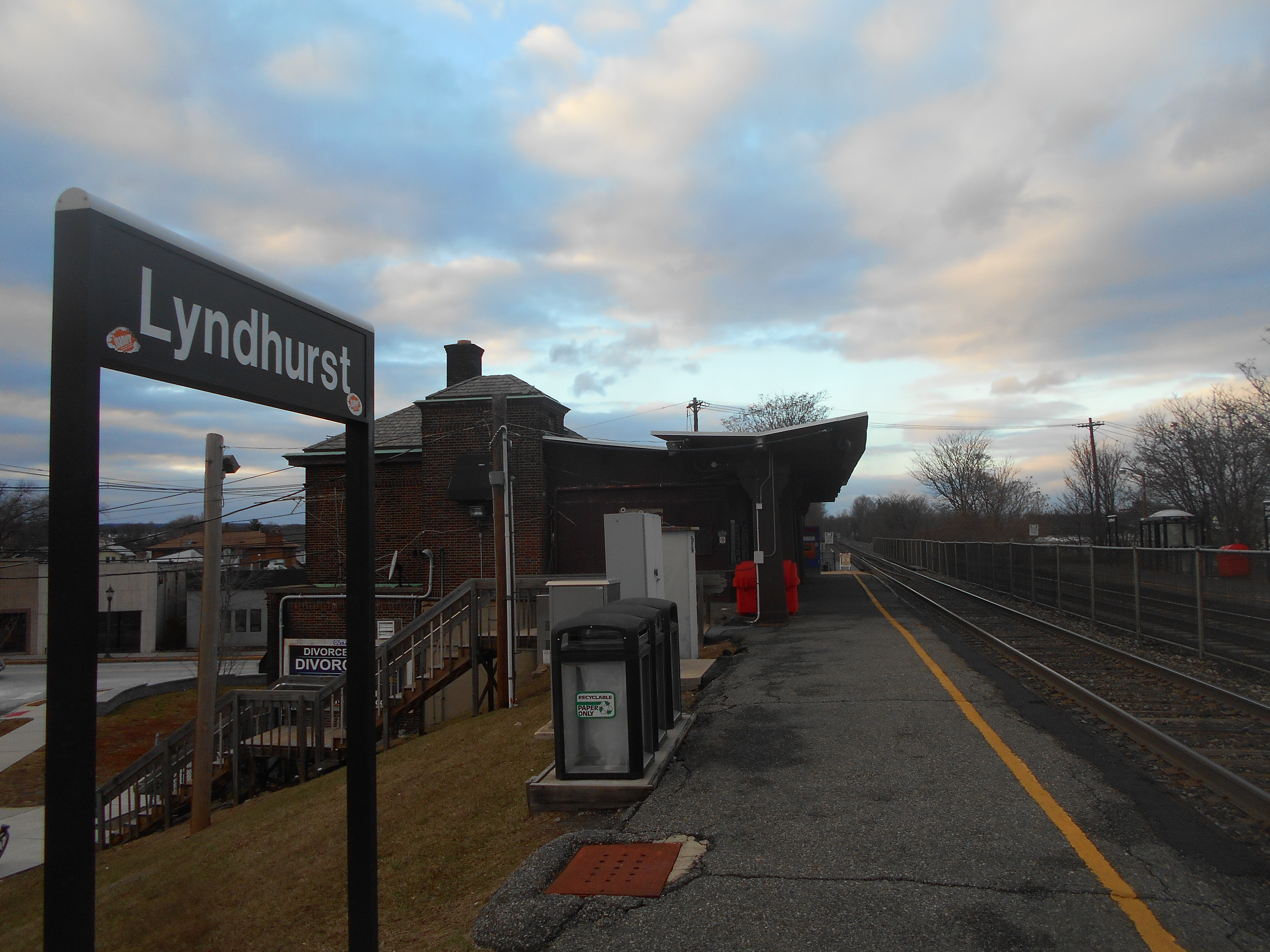
Lyndhurst station in January 2015

Originally located along the Delaware, Lackawanna and Western Railroad's Boonton Branch, the segment including Lyndhurst station became part of the Main Line as part of a 1956 plan of coordination between the Lackawanna and the Erie Railroad, which would merge to become the Erie Lackawanna Railroad in 1960. A brick station building was built 1928 to replace an older wood facility. The historic station is part of the New Jersey Register of Historic Places Delaware, Lackawanna and Western Railroad Boonton Line Historic District.

=== Renovation ===
On June 22, 2010, the town of Lyndhurst put forward a proposal to buy the station depots at both Lyndhurst and sister Kingsland stations. The mayor of Lyndhurst, Richard DiLascio, said that the stations had seen better days and NJ Transit had no interest in renovating both buildings, rather selling both at a fee to the town. The town requested that NJT lease the building to the municipality so that it might be renovated and brought into use as a way to revitalize the immediate vicinity.

During the summer of 2011 the Lyndhurst station went under some minor renovations, including new stair supports and a new roof over a portion of the southern (eastbound) platform. In August 2012, NJT announced that the $2.5 million would be spent to make the station compliant with the Americans with Disabilities Act of 1990 (ADA). It also stated funding for a total renovation costing approximately $26 million had been identified, but that the plan was in preliminary stages.

=== Replacement ===
As of March 6, 2019, plans were finalized to replace the station building and platforms by the town of Lyndhurst and New Jersey Transit. The plans include new protected waiting areas, new ticketing locations and better ADA-accepted access to the platform, and will cost $22 million.

NJ Transit announced on September 9, 2020, that a $18.5 million contract was approved for the new Lyndhurst station. The new station was designed to "replicate the historic style of the Lyndhurst neighborhood" and be located south of the present station, at Delafield Avenue and Court Avenue. The Federal Transit Administration provided a $30.9 million grant for the new station. NJ Transit and officials held a ribbon-cutting ceremony on April 28, 2025 and announced the new station would open on June 8, 2025. As part of the opening of the new station, Kingsland station closed at the same time.

== Station layout ==
The station has two tracks, each with a high-level side platform.

== Bibliography ==
- Lyon, Isaac S. (1873). Historical Discourse on Boonton, Delivered Before the Citizens of Boonton at Washington Hall, on the Evenings of September 21 and 28, and October 5, 1867. Newark, New Jersey: The Daily Journal Office.
