= Lake View station (Erie Railroad) =

Lake View
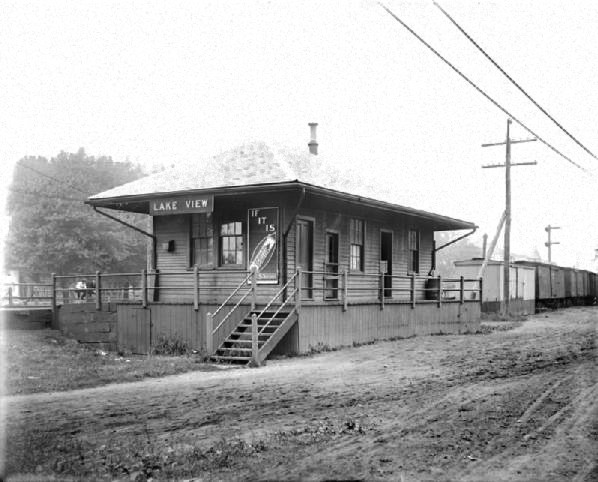
- Lake View station in 1909. This building remained in use until the line's termination in 1963.

General information
- Location: Railway Avenue, Clifton, New Jersey
- Coordinates: 40.8908°N 74.1498°W
- Owner: Erie Railroad (1883–1960); Erie-Lackawanna Railway (1960–1963)
- Line: Erie Railroad Main Line (until 1963)
- Platforms: 1 side platforms
- Tracks: 2 main line

Construction
- Platform levels: 1

History
- Opened: 1883; 143 years ago
- Closed: April 2, 1963; 63 years ago

Key dates
- 1967: Station depot razed

Services
Preceding station	Erie Railroad	Following station
Paterson toward Ridgewood	Main Line local stops	Clifton toward Jersey City
Location

Lake View is a former railroad station for the Erie Railroad in the community of Paterson, New Jersey. The station was located at the intersection of Railway Avenue and Crooks Avenue in the Lakeview district of Paterson, just north of the Clifton town line. The station consisted of two platforms, with a small shelter-sized depot on the westbound tracks and no shelter whatsoever on the eastbound side heading towards Pavonia Terminal. The station was first opened in 1883 in the Lakeview district, and remained in use for nearly eight decades. In 1952 and 1953, as a deal made for Passaic, New Jersey, stations at Clifton and Main Street-Passaic were rebuilt. However, Lake View was not, and when the Passaic Plan was enacted on April 2, 1963, the last passenger trains served Lake View served the old 1883 depot. The depot was razed in the autumn of 1967.

== Station layout and services ==
Lake View station's layout consisted of two asphalt platforms in between three tracks, one located between two northbound tracks, and one next to the station depot, built along Railway Avenue just north of Crooks Avenue in Paterson. The station building itself was a 37 ft × 16 ft (11.3 m × 4.9 m) building with a shingled roof. The track was laced with intertrack fencing to prevent people from crossing the tracks. Parking was accessible from Railway Avenue and located along the station's eastbound platform. The station itself was 15 miles (24 km) from New York City's Chambers Street Ferry Terminal, where people caught ferries to Jersey City and the Erie Railroad trains.

== History ==
Lake View station first opened along the Erie Railroad's main line, constructed from 1846 to 1851, in 1885. The station itself was a Type IV construction, situated 15 miles (24 km) from the Erie's Chambers Street Ferry Terminal in New York City. In 1889, the station received twenty-one trains from New York and the same amount inbound. The station cost only $.50 (1889 USD) to reach one-way and $.70 round trip. A fifty-trip, commutation ticket set from Lake View - New York cost only $12.50 (1889 USD).

During the 1950s and 1960s, several different priorities from different agencies around the cities of Paterson and Passaic were beginning to form. The Delaware, Lackawanna and Western, a competing railroad with the Erie, wanted to condense (along with the Erie) services and share trackage because of financial troubles. Secondly, the city officials in Passaic had first brought a proposal to the Erie asking about the removal of the main line through the city, which was tying up traffic in the city during station stops. This, however, was not implemented during the 1950s, as proposed. Instead, the Erie reconstructed the stations at downtown Passaic and Clifton. However, although its on the same alignment, the station at Lake View, the 1885 depot was not replaced and remained in use until 1963. Third, the New Jersey State Highway Department needed rights-of-way for Interstate 80 through Paterson and State Route 21 through Passaic (right where Passaic Park station and BE Drawbridge were located).

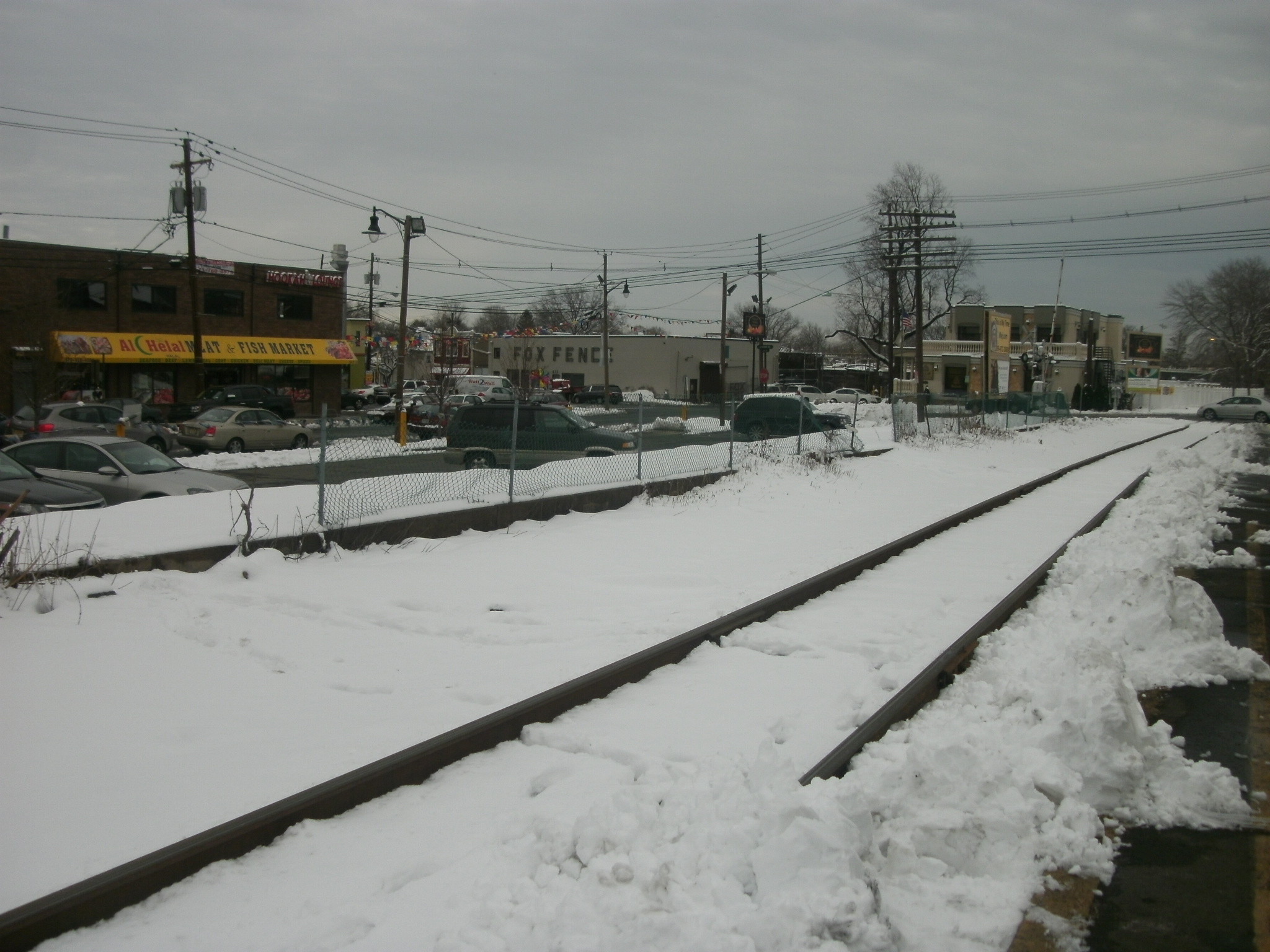
The Lake View station site in the late winter of 2011

After the merge on October 17, 1960, between the Delaware, Lackawanna and Western and the Erie, the city officials in Passaic once again brought back the possibility of removing the tracks through Main Street, Passaic. This time, the newly formed Erie-Lackawanna went forward with it, beginning the process to move its main line onto the former Boonton Branch through Lyndhurst, Passaic and Clifton. The main line was abandoned past Carlton Hill, and BE Drawbridge was swung in the open position, and soon put up for sale price of $0.00 in 1964 by the mayor of Passaic.

After the abandonment, Lake View station, along with Clifton, Passaic and Passaic Park stations were abandoned and the tracks torn up. Although all the passenger trains were re-routed through Passaic and Clifton along the former Delaware, Lackawanna and Western Boonton Branch, portions of the track from XW Tower in Paterson to Lake View were to be retained for use by freights. As of 2019, the tracks remain through Lake View, but the station itself has been removed since Autumn 1967.

== Bibliography ==
- Yanosey, Robert J. (2007). Lackawanna Railroad Facilities (In Color). Vol. 1: Hoboken to Dover. Scotch Plains, New Jersey: Morning Sun Books Inc. ISBN 978-1582482149.
