= Lincoln Park station =

NJ Transit rail station

Lincoln Park
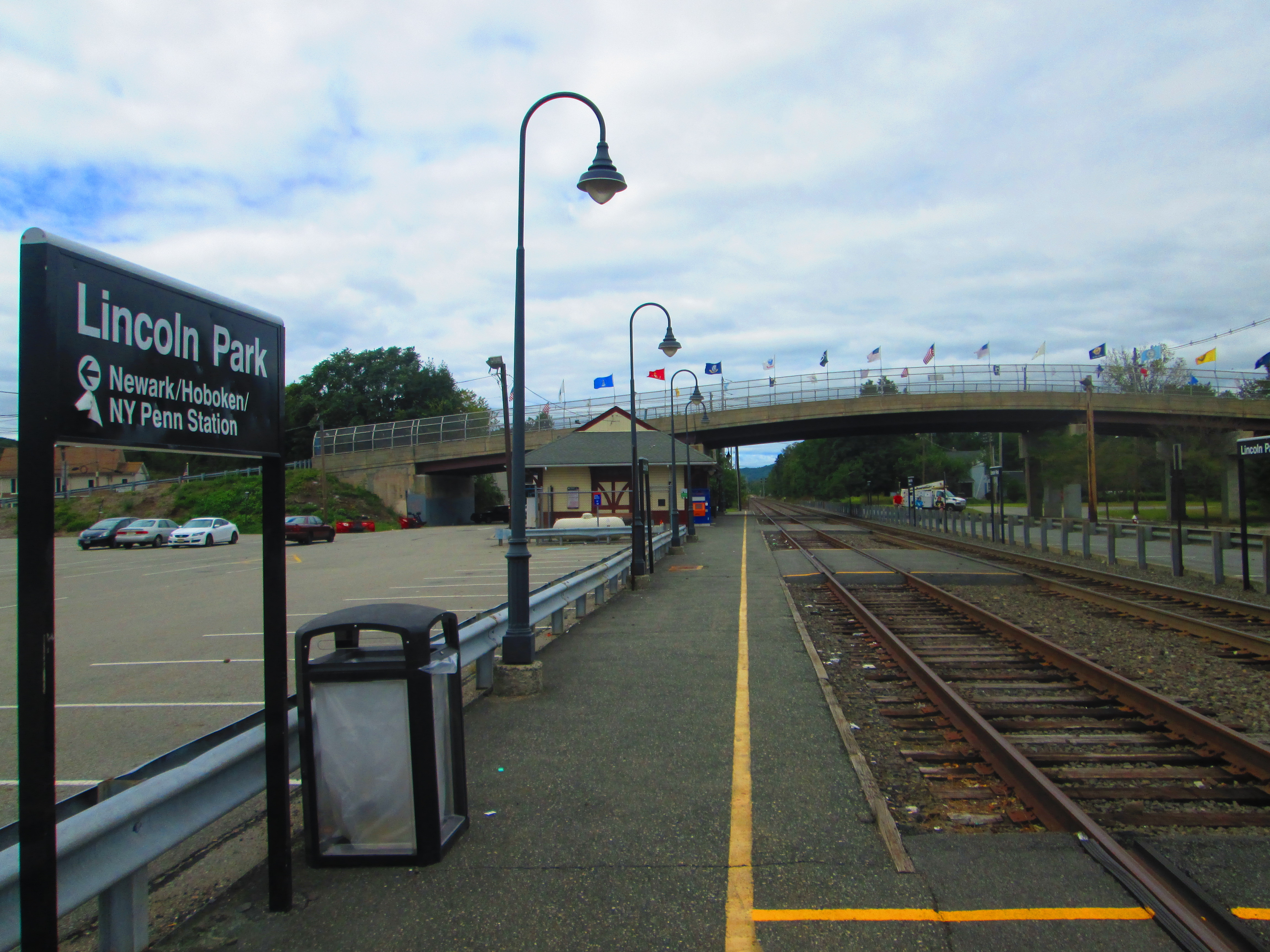
- Lincoln Park station and its lone platform facing westbound heading towards the 1905 station.

General information
- Location: Main Street at Comly Road, Lincoln Park, New Jersey
- Coordinates: 40°55′27″N 74°18′08″W
- Owner: NJ Transit
- Platforms: 1 side platform
- Tracks: 2
- Connections: NJT Bus: 871; Lakeland: 46 (on Route 202, limited Lakeland service)

Construction
- Accessible: yes

Other information
- Fare zone: 10

History
- Opened: September 12, 1870 (freight service); December 14, 1870 (passenger service)
- Rebuilt: 1905
- Former names: Beavertown

Passengers
- 2025: 43 (average weekday)
- Rank: 144 of 153

Services
Preceding station	NJ Transit	Following station
Towaco toward Hackettstown	Montclair–Boonton Line limited service	Mountain View toward New York or Hoboken
Former services
Preceding station	Delaware, Lackawanna and Western Railroad	Following station
Towaco toward Dover	Boonton Branch	Mountain View toward Hoboken
Location

Lincoln Park is a station on NJ Transit's Montclair–Boonton Line in the borough of Lincoln Park, Morris County, New Jersey. The station is located near the Comly Road overpass, accessible from Main Street, Station Road and Park Avenue.

== History ==
Railroad service in Lincoln Park began on September 12, 1870 with the extension of the Delaware, Lackawanna and Western Railroad's Boonton Branch as a freight only stop known as Beavertown. Passenger service began on December 14, 1870. The railroad built the current station depot in 1905.

== Station layout ==
The station has two tracks and one side platform. The station is not compliant with the Americans with Disabilities Act of 1990.

It features a parking lot on both sides, and a waiting room with a bathroom. The station also has a pedestrian crossing with two railroad crossing signs that each have two yellow lights which always blink. The station has two tracks that run through, although only one of those tracks are used for passenger service. Lincoln Park has a roughly 1 mile (1.6 km)-long siding that runs right through the station that is dispatcher controlled. It was formerly used for meets before midday service was discontinued, and no longer sees service by revenue trains.

== Bibliography ==
- Lyon, Isaac S. (1873). Historical Discourse on Boonton, Delivered Before the Citizens of Boonton at Washington Hall, on the Evenings of September 21 and 28, and October 5, 1867. Newark, New Jersey: The Daily Journal Office.
- Yanosey, Robert J. (2007). Lackawanna Railroad Facilities (In Color). Vol. 1: Hoboken to Dover. Scotch Plains, New Jersey: Morning Sun Books Inc. ISBN 9781582482149.
