= Harrison Street station =

Railroad station in New Jersey

Harrison Street
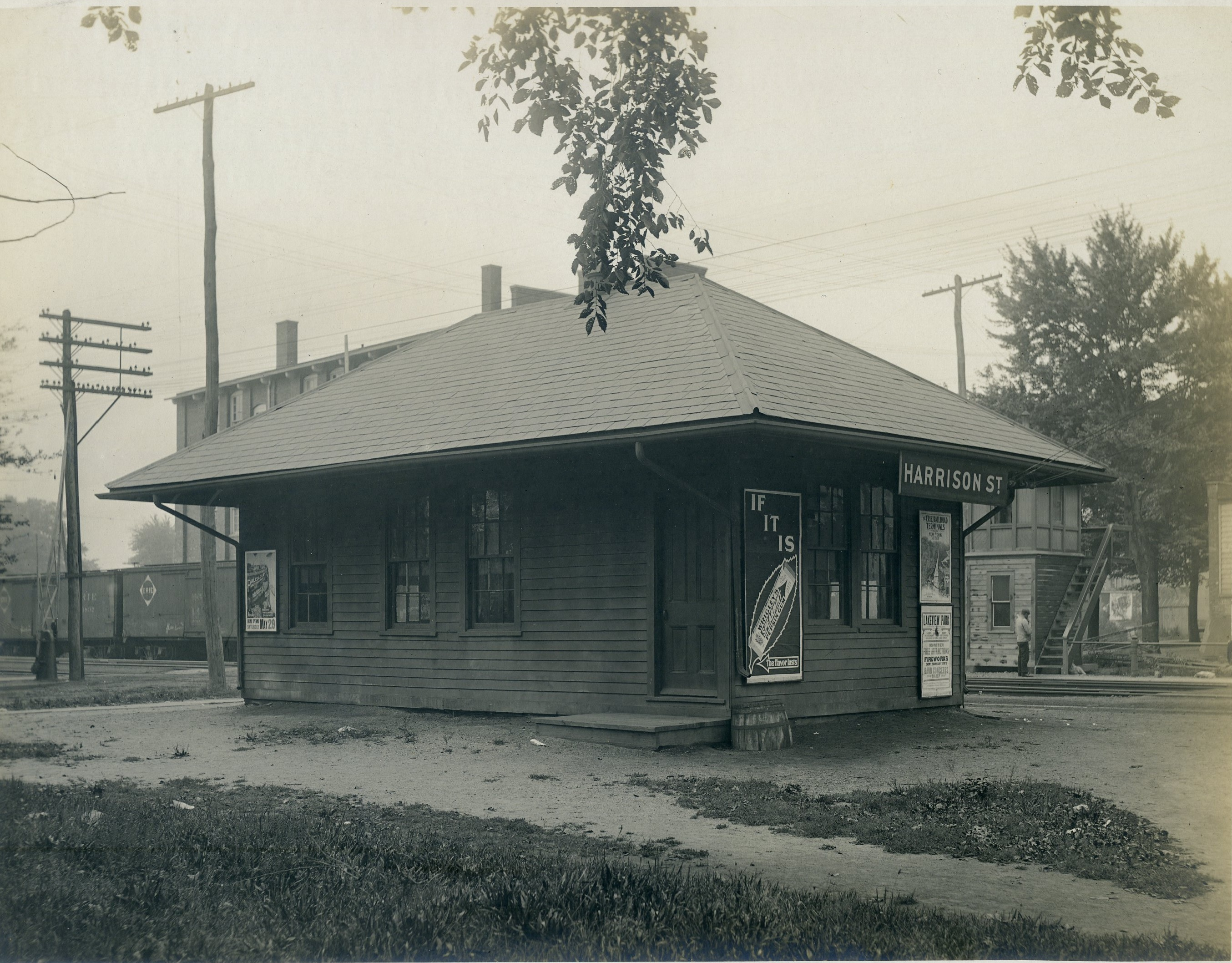
- Harrison Street station in December 1909.

General information
- Location: 360 Harrison Street, Passaic, New Jersey
- Coordinates: 40.868045°N 74.131247°W
- Line: Erie Railroad Main Line
- Platforms: 2 side platforms
- Tracks: 2 main line

Construction
- Platform levels: 1

Other information
- Station code: 2133

History
- Closed: 1953
- Rebuilt: 1913

Key dates
- August 1952: Station depot demolished

Former services
Preceding station	Erie Railroad	Following station
Clifton toward Ridgewood	Main Line local stops	Passaic toward Jersey City
Location

Harrison Street was a former Erie Railroad main line city on the western edge of the city of Passaic, New Jersey. Located at the grade crossing of Harrison Street near Clifton, the station was first/last when entering the city. Heading westbound, the next station was Clifton while the next station east was the downtown Passaic station. The Erie Railroad agreed with the city of Passaic to abandon the station depot at Harrison Street in June 1952 (along with the one at Prospect Street) due to low ridership. The station depot, built in 1913, suffered a small fire on July 25, 1952. Demolition of the building began within a week after the fire, though the process took less time due to the flames.
