= Kingsland station =

NJ Transit rail station

Kingsland
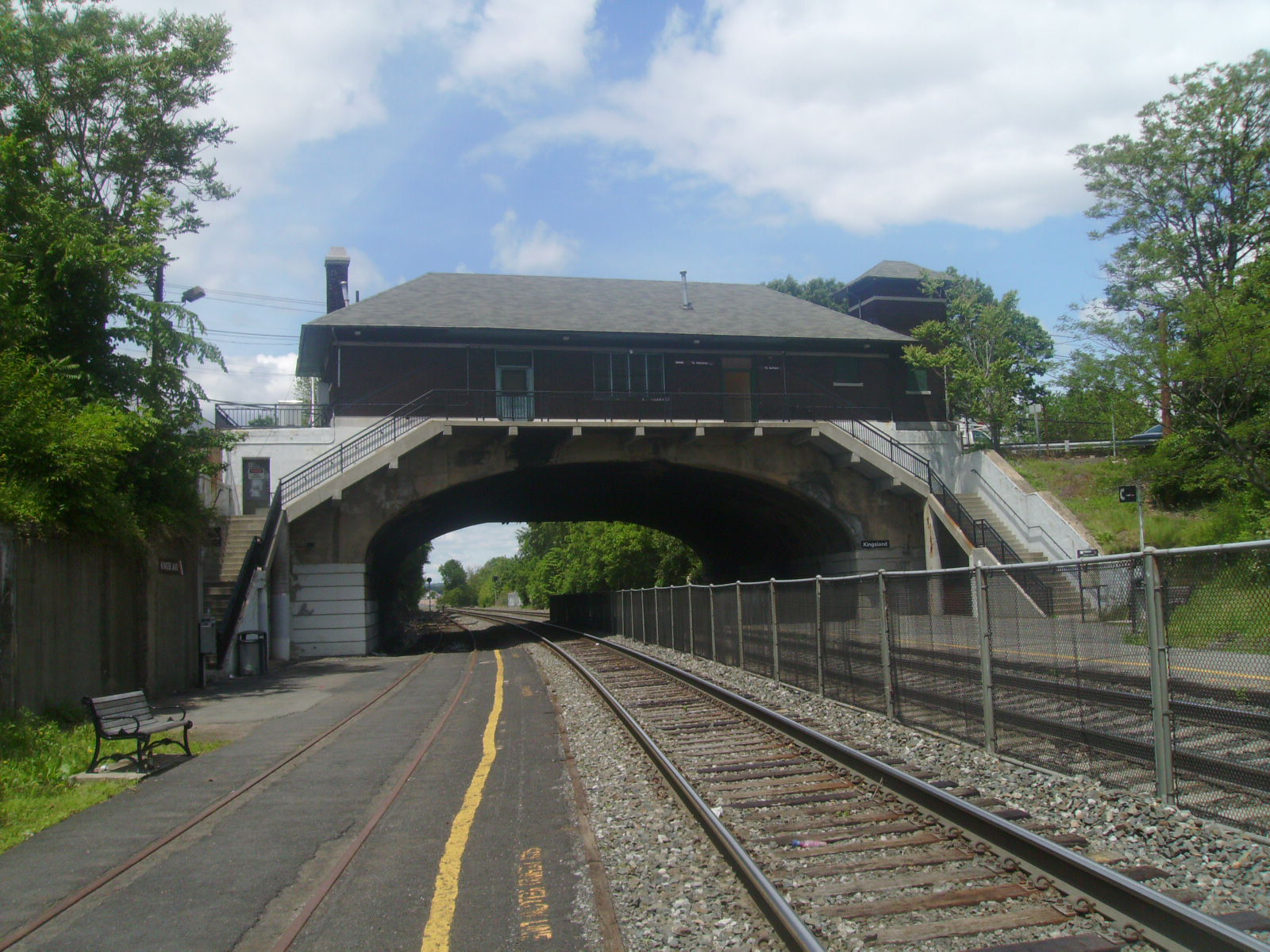
- Kingsland station facing northbound (towards Suffern) on the Hoboken-bound platform, with the station depot and Route 17 crossing overhead.

General information
- Location: 250 Ridge Road (Route 17), Lyndhurst, New Jersey
- Coordinates: 40.8101°N 74.1172°W
- Owner: New Jersey Transit
- Platforms: 2 side platforms
- Tracks: 2
- Connections: NJT Bus: 76

Construction
- Platform levels: 1
- Parking: 19 spaces

Other information
- Fare zone: 2

History
- Opened: September 12, 1870 (freight service); December 14, 1870 (passenger service)
- Closed: June 8, 2025
- Rebuilt: –December 2, 1918

Passengers
- 2024: 321 (average weekday)

Former services
Preceding station	NJ Transit	Following station
Lyndhurst toward Suffern	Main Line	Secaucus Junction toward Hoboken
Preceding station	Delaware, Lackawanna and Western Railroad	Following station
Lyndhurst toward Dover	Boonton Branch	Hoboken Terminus
Location

Kingsland was a railroad station on New Jersey Transit's Main Line. It was located under Ridge Road (Route 17) between New York and Valley Brook Avenues in Lyndhurst, New Jersey, and was one of two stations in Lyndhurst. The station was not staffed, and passengers used ticket vending machines (TVMs) located at street level to purchase tickets. The station was not handicapped-accessible. Originally part of the Delaware, Lackawanna and Western Railroad's Boonton Branch, the current Kingsland station was built in 1918. Kingsland station closed on June 8, 2025 with the opening of the new Lyndhurst station.

== History ==
=== Delaware, Lackawanna and Western Railroad ===
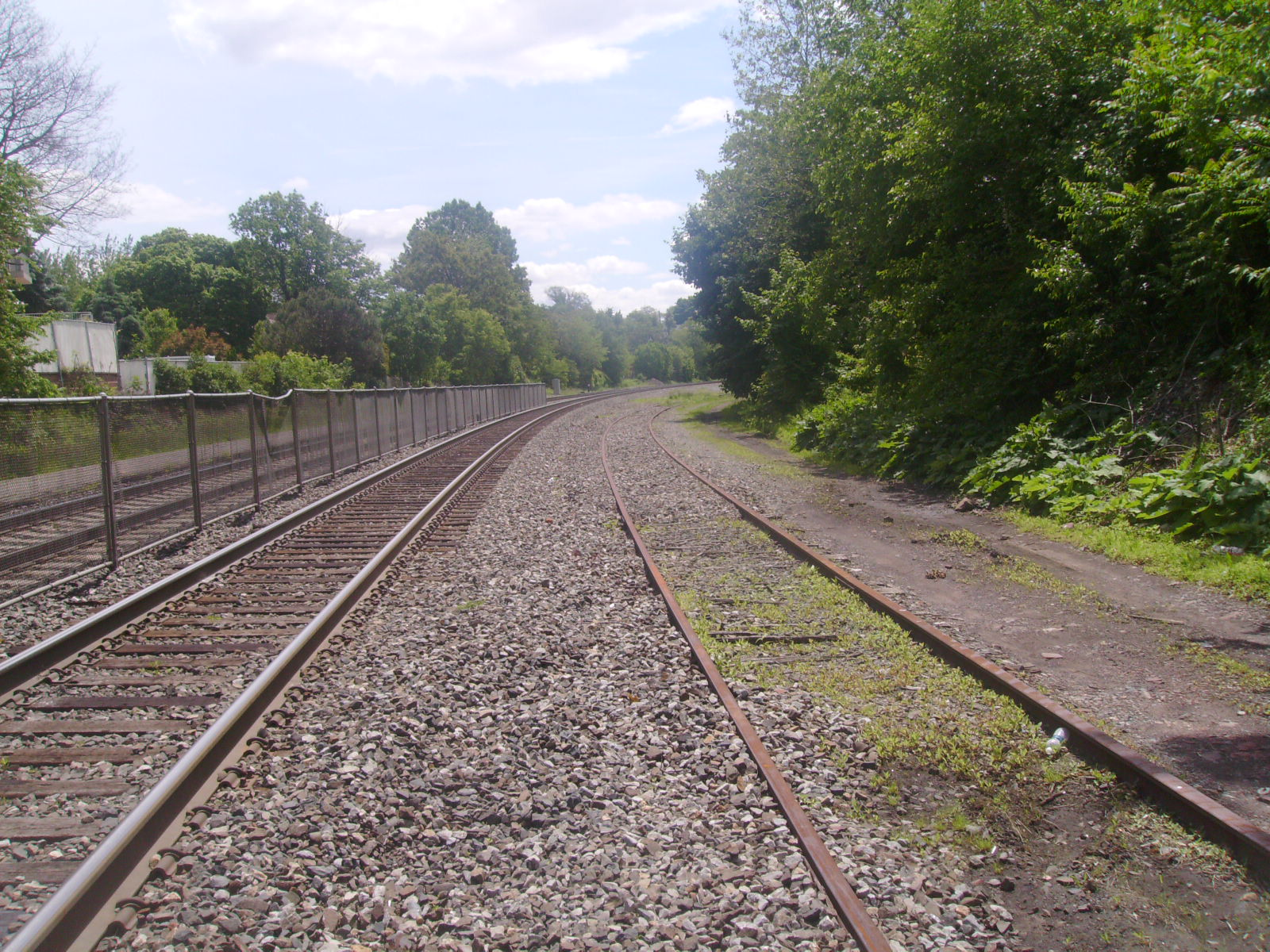
The Harrison Cut-Off track just south of the Kingsland station platform. The track continues through the platform

The Boonton Branch of the Delaware, Lackawanna and Western Railroad was first constructed as a freight bypass of the Morris & Essex Railroad in 1868. This was constructed due to the lack of freight along its passenger lines and stretched from the Denville station to Hoboken Terminal via Boonton and Paterson. The line had shops at Kingsland, built in 1868 for the purpose of repairing, restoring and re-erecting train cars and locomotives for the line. In 1875, shop equipment from Hoboken was moved over to Kingsland. However, just seven years later, the machine shop, also the main building of the shops, caught fire and was completely destroyed. Despite the fire, the structure was immediately reconstructed for use. During this time, the Delaware, Lackawanna and Western used a small house as a station depot.

When the Delaware, Lackawanna and Western expanded the Kingsland Shops in 1903, a new station depot was constructed of brick along with a cut and cover tunnel. The tunnel itself cost $71,500 (1903 USD) and permitted the local street, Schuyler Avenue to cross over the rail line. The new station depot was built on Ridge Road over the tracks, with platforms crossing over the new bridge. The design of the station depot located above the tracks was later replicated by the Delaware, Lackawanna and Western's Montclair Branch for its Watsessing Avenue station in Bloomfield, New Jersey.

In 1917, the railroad was brought before the New Jersey Board of Public Utility Commissioners due to an accident on November 28, 1916, at Kingsland station. Passenger train No. 582, a special train for employees of the Canadian Car Company, had near stopped at Kingsland station. The train never left at any defined time, although averaged around 6:30 in the evening. However, around 6:30 that evening, Train No. 479 came in twelve minutes late at a high speed, and as a result could not slow down fast enough to avoid hitting passengers. At that time, the station had no inter-track fencing to prevent crossing of both Boonton Branch tracks, and because of this, people could board trains from either platform. That day the engineer of Train No. 479 was unable to see the platform or the special train, and due to the lack of signals, had no information until the train left the west portal of Kingsland Tunnel. However, signals were set for west-bound trains if problems were to occur. After the accident, the Board requested the Lackawanna to install a westbound signal to prevent further accidents, while the Canadian Car Company moved its boarding to the company's rail siding.

=== Erie–Lackawanna Railroad and the Passaic Plan ===
After several years of sharing railroad facilities, the Erie Railroad and Delaware, Lackawanna and Western Railroad merged on October 17, 1960, replaced by the Erie-Lackawanna Railway. Since 1949 the Erie Railroad had been dealing with the city of Passaic, New Jersey about its double track mainline through the city via Rutherford. Due to the high cost of removing the main line with no back-up service, it was unable to progress forward, and as a result, the Erie built some new stations to replace old wooden ones in 1952. With the railroad merger in 1960, the Erie–Lackawanna had the Boonton Branch that also served Passaic, and on August 23, 1960, with pressure from the New Jersey Department of Transportation to go ahead with it, a deal was struck between the city of Passaic and the railroad. A new connection was to be made via the Erie's old Newark Branch to connect the Boonton Branch to the old Erie main at South Paterson. The old Erie main line through Passaic was abandoned at a ceremony on April 2, 1963, when service was terminated. Trains were re-routed via a "new" main line, using the Boonton Branch from Kingsland to Athenia.

The remainder of the Boonton Branch was steadily decommissioned through 1963, as the New Jersey Department of Transportation requested the Boonton Branch's alignment through Paterson as part of Interstate 80 and New Jersey Route 21 through Passaic near BE Drawbridge and the Passaic Park station. This was turned over to the Department of Transportation on October 27, 1963, after a connection was constructed at Mountain View to the Erie's former New York and Greenwood Lake Railroad. The stretch from Paterson Junction to Totowa, including the Paterson High Bridge built in 1902, was abandoned and soon dismantled. However, despite the changes, the Erie–Lackawanna continued to lose strength and in 1975, agreed to become part of the Consolidated Rail Corporation, dubbed Conrail, effective April 1, 1976.

=== New Jersey Transit ===
In January 1983, Consolidated Rail Corporation handed over operation of the commuter railroads to New Jersey Transit Rail Operations. On September 20, 2002, as part of the Montclair Connection, merging the Montclair Branch and Boonton Line, the Arlington station in Kearny was closed, resulting in the lack of a station in Kearny. As a result, a rail shuttle bus was created by the town of Kearny to bus passengers from Arlington station north to Kingsland (parallelling NJ Transit's bus route #76, giving rail passenger service to New York Penn Station and Hoboken Terminal. Shuttle buses were aligned at that time with the 5:02 AM, 6:03 PM and 7:08 PM. Services were adjusted for the timetable services on September 30, 2002.

On June 22, 2010, the town of Lyndhurst put forward a proposal to buy the station depots at both Kingsland and Lyndhurst stations. The mayor of Lyndhurst, Richard DiLascio, said that the stations have seen better days and New Jersey Transit has no interest in renovating both buildings. Design plans for Kingsland station look towards a new coffee shop, after repairing and renovating the building. The station would also be converted from its old subway tile to a newer retro look for the building, paid for by leasing the building. Because an average of 440 to over 1,000 people use the Kingsland station daily, it would look better for the town of Lyndhurst to make a good impression on the riders. As of 2012, the station house was unoccupied. The town of Lyndhurst requested that NJT lease the building to the municipality so that it might be renovated and brought into use as a way to revitalize the immediate vicinity.

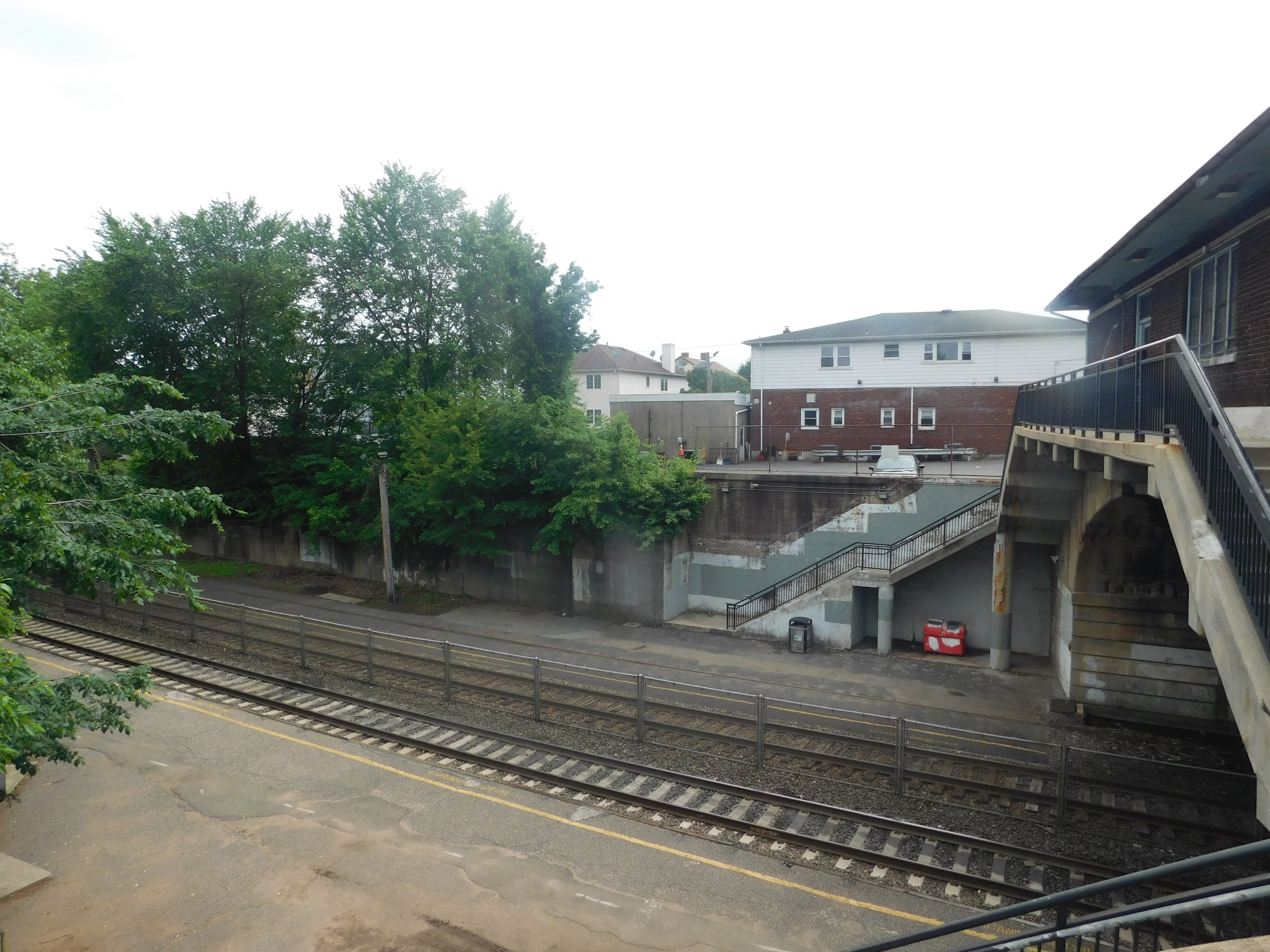
Kingsland station on June 8, 2025, hours after it closed for good

In 2021, it was revealed that once the new Lyndhurst train station was complete, Kingsland station would be closed. On August 14, 2024, NJ Transit held public hearings on the proposed closure, which would take effect in May 2025, following the opening of the rebuilt Lyndhurst station. NJ Transit proposed the closure since Kingsland's parking lot could not be expanded, its station infrastructure had deteriorated, and it is not ADA-accessible. The rebuilt Lyndhurst station would be relocated to be closer to the site of Kingsland station. The proposed closure was criticized for requiring an additional 0.8-mile (1.3 km) walk for pedestrians and the loss of the bus connection to the 76 bus route. The station building would remain in use for storage. On November 14, 2024, the NJ Transit board voted to close the Kingsland station, effective when the new Lyndhurst station begins operations in 2025.

Kingsland station closed on June 8, 2025 with the opening of the new Lyndhurst station.

== Station layout and services ==
Kingsland station had two tracks, each with a low-level side platform. The over-track train station house is located on a bridge over the Main Line on Route 17 (Ridge Road) crossing over the tracks. A short tunnel leads downstairs to the two side platforms. The station platform on the Hoboken Terminal-bound side has a third track that heads through the platform, the western leg of a wye used for the Harrison Cut-Off, built by the Delaware, Lackawanna and Western Railroad. Above ground, the station is provided with just nineteen parking spaces, none designated for the handicapped. There was no fee for parking. Short-term parking was also provided by New Jersey Transit on Route 17.

The station had a connection to Route 76 run by New Jersey Transit Bus Operations.
