= Clifton station (NJ Transit) =

Train station in Clifton, New Jersey, US

Clifton
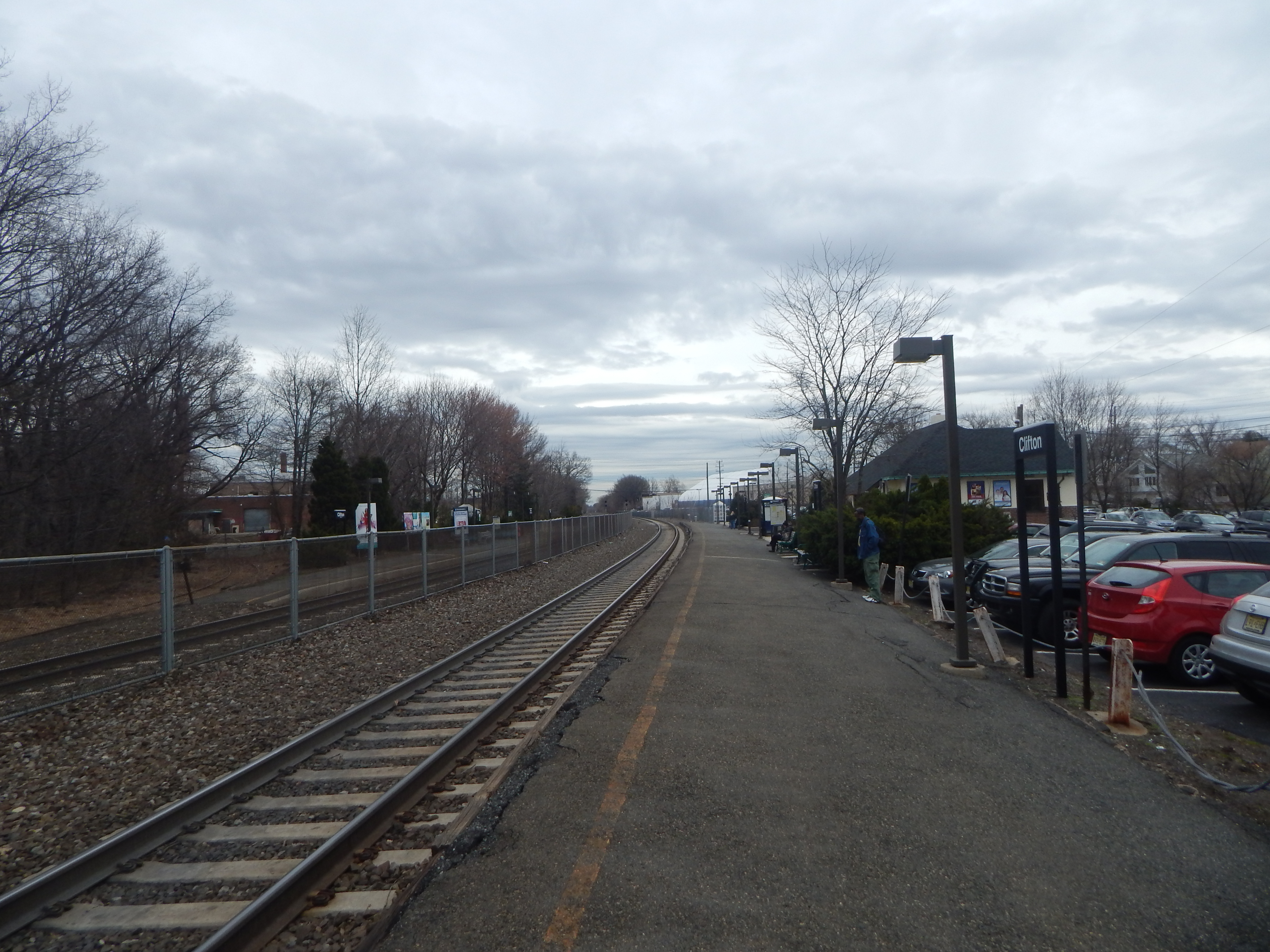
- Clifton station in April 2015.

General information
- Location: Elm Street at Clifton Boulevard, Clifton, New Jersey
- Coordinates: 40.8679°N 74.1535°W
- Owner: New Jersey Transit
- Platforms: 2 side platforms
- Tracks: 2
- Connections: NJT Bus: 705 and 707

Construction
- Parking: 236 spaces

Other information
- Fare zone: 5

History
- Opened: September 12, 1870 (freight service); December 14, 1870 (passenger service)

Passengers
- 2025: 546 (average weekday)
- Rank: 53 of 153

Services
Preceding station	NJ Transit	Following station
Paterson toward Suffern	Main Line	Passaic toward Hoboken
Former services
Preceding station	Delaware, Lackawanna and Western Railroad	Following station
Paterson toward Dover	Boonton Branch	Passaic toward Hoboken
Location

Clifton is a New Jersey Transit train station located in Clifton, New Jersey, that provides service via the Main Line. The station is located near the intersection of Elm Street, Clifton Terrace, and Clifton Boulevard in Clifton and the tracks form the border between the Athenia and Dutch Hill sections of the city, with the Hoboken-bound platform in Athenia and the Suffern-bound platform located in Dutch Hill.

== History ==
The Boonton Branch of the Delaware, Lackawanna and Western Railroad was first constructed as a freight bypass of the Morris & Essex Railroad in 1868. This was constructed due to the unsuitability of its passenger lines for freight (due to curves and inclines), and stretched from the Denville station to Hoboken Terminal via Boonton and Paterson. Freight service began on September 12, 1870, while passenger service began on December 14, 1870.

== Station layout ==
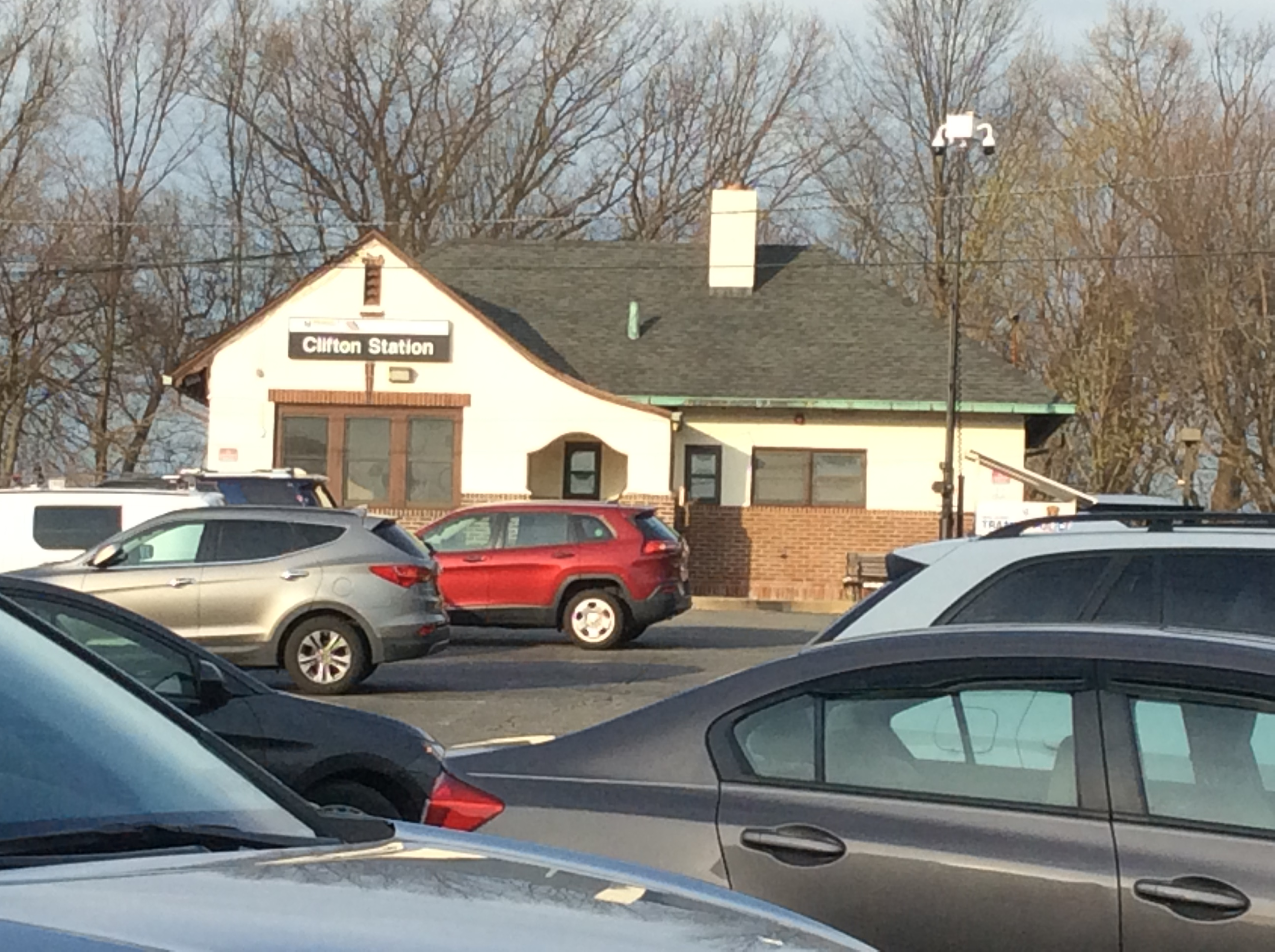
The station house at Clifton station

The station has two tracks, each with a low-level side platform. Parking for up to 236 cars is available, with two lots and some limited street parking along Fornelius Avenue. The station house is open during the day, weekdays, until 7:30 P.M., for riders to wait for their trains, and there are also benches and shelters on both platforms. The only ticket vending machine at the station is located adjacent to the Hoboken-bound platform.

== Bibliography ==
- Lyon, Isaac S. (1873). Historical Discourse on Boonton, Delivered Before the Citizens of Boonton at Washington Hall, on the Evenings of September 21 and 28, and October 5, 1867. Newark, New Jersey: The Daily Journal Office.
