= Mountain View station (Delaware, Lackawanna and Western Railroad) =

Former railway station in Wayne Township, New Jersey, US

Mountain View
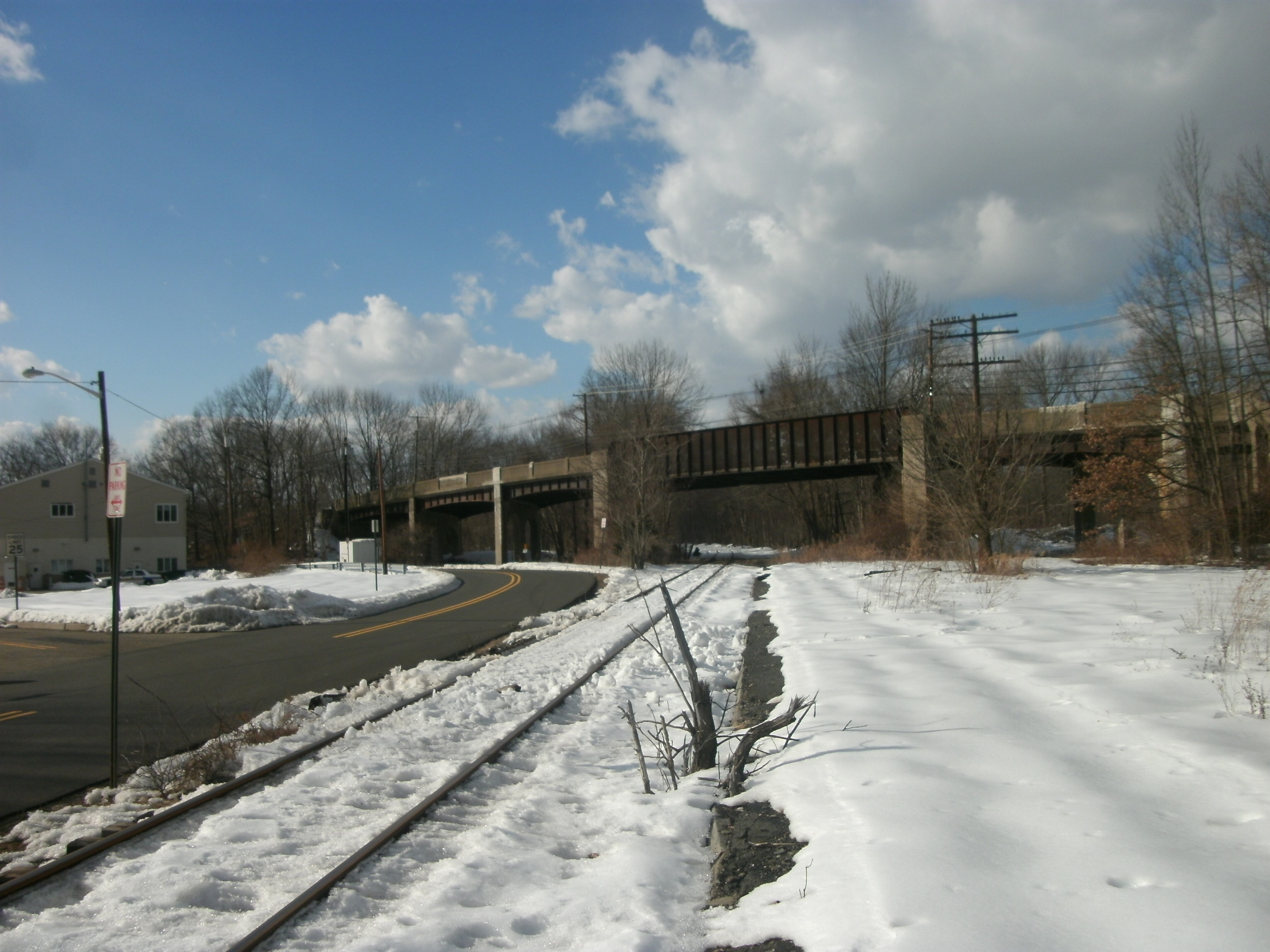
- The former station in Mountain View in February 2011.

General information
- Location: Parish and Pal Drives, Wayne, New Jersey 07470
- Coordinates: 40°54′48.8″N 74°15′36.6″W
- Line: Boonton Branch
- Platforms: 1 side platform
- Tracks: 4

History
- Opened: May 12, 1877
- Closed: October 25, 1963
- Rebuilt: 1909
- Electrified: Not electrified

Services
Preceding station	Delaware, Lackawanna and Western Railroad	Following station
Lincoln Park toward Dover	Boonton Branch	Totowa–Little Falls toward Hoboken
Location

Mountain View was a station on the Boonton Branch of the Delaware, Lackawanna and Western Railroad. Located in the Mountain View section of Wayne Township, New Jersey, the station was at the Parish Drive bridge over the tracks. The station was 20.8 miles (33.5 km) away from its terminus at Hoboken Terminal on the shores of the Hudson River, where connections would be made to New York City via ferry and the Hudson and Manhattan Railroad. The western terminus. Denville, was 12.8 miles (20.6 km) away, where connections with the Morris and Essex Railroad were available. Just west of the station was Mountain View junction, where a connection to the Erie Railroad's New York and Greenwood Lake Railway was made.

== History ==
Construction of the railroad through the Mountain View section of Wayne began in 1869 when the Morris and Essex Railroad began building a freight line. Mountain View station opened on May 12, 1877 after construction began in the summer of 1873 with the North Bergen Tunnel through Bergen Hill. The new tunnel would get service on the Lackawanna to Hoboken for its new terminal. The station was rebuilt in 1909 by the railroad. The Parish Drive overpass was built north of the station in 1939 as part of work for the Works Progress Administration.

The station closed in April 1963 after the right-of-way through Paterson was purchased for the construction of Route 20 and Interstate 80. Mountain View was one of three stops closed when the Erie-Lackawanna Railroad moved service to the Main Line of the former Erie north of Paterson. The others were Totowa–Little Falls and Paterson's Marshall Street station.

Mountain View station on both the Lackawanna and the Erie served as connector points with bus service to the nearby Packanack Lake. People could commute to the lake by taking the train to either station, meeting with the free bus.

== Bibliography ==
- Shaw, William H. (1884). History of Essex and Hudson Counties, New Jersey, Volume 1. Everts & Peck.
- Taber, Thomas Townsend; Taber, Thomas Townsend III (1981). The Delaware, Lackawanna & Western Railroad in the Twentieth Century. Vol. 2. Muncy, PA: Privately printed. ISBN 0-9603398-3-3.
- Tobin, Cathy (2001). Images of America: Wayne Township. Arcadia Publishing. ISBN 9780738509471.
