= Boonton Branch =

Railroad line in New Jersey

The Boonton Branch refers to the railroad line in New Jersey that was completed in 1870 and ran 34 miles (54.8 km) from Hoboken to East Dover Junction as part of the Morris & Essex Railroad (M&E). Although the branch hosted commuter trains (and to a lesser extent, passenger trains), the line was primarily built as a freight bypass line. The term "branch", therefore, is somewhat of a misnomer since the Boonton Branch was built to higher mainline standards than the Morristown Line, the line that it bypassed. As a result, the Boonton Branch better meets the definition of a "cut-off" rather than a branch. Some of the towns that the Boonton Branch passed through included Lyndhurst, Passaic, Clifton, Paterson, Wayne, Lincoln Park, Mountain Lakes, and its namesake, Boonton.

== History and construction ==
By the end of the American Civil War in 1865, the management of the Morris & Essex Railroad had recognized that the Morristown Line was inadequate as a freight line. The line was circuitous and westbound trains had to climb the steep 1.5% grade to reach Summit, New Jersey. Although not yet as significant as it would become in the 20th Century, the Morristown Line also passed through numerous small towns that were served by passenger trains, which could interfere with freight movements. (The term "commuter" was just coming into vogue at that time.) Rather than attempting to rebuild an existing line, the Lackawanna, which controlled the M&E, decided to build a completely new line. The new line would span 34 miles, leaving the Morristown Line just west of the Bergen Tunnels at West End (which became a junction) and then rejoining the Morristown line at East Dover Jct. (In 1903, Denville Jct. would be created at its present location and East Dover Jct. would be downgraded.)

Construction began in 1869 and was completed by 1870. Reportedly, very few construction problems were encountered. The line more or less paralleled the Morris Canal for its entire length. This was hardly a coincidence for both competitive and topographical reasons. From a competitive point of view, the canal carried significant coal traffic at the time the Boonton Branch was built. As the "Road of Anthracite", the Lackawanna tapped the anthracite-rich hills of the Scranton Valley to supply the suburbs of New Jersey. The huge increase in transport capacity offered by the new line shifted virtually all coal traffic off the canal and to the railroad: the railroad's delivery schedule was counted in hours—not days (as was the case of the canal)—and the railroad didn't freeze over for four months out of the year, at the time when its most profitable commodity was in greatest demand. From a topographical point of view, the Boonton Branch's alignment allowed for fast freight service over a line that was relatively uncongested by commuter and passenger traffic. Westbound, trains still had to overcome a ruling grade of 1%, which often required pusher engines and helper engines. Even so, the Boonton Branch's grade profile was a decided improvement over the Morristown Line's. When the section of the branch through the Hackensack Meadowlands was destroyed in 1917 by the Kingsland explosion (caused by German sabotage of an ammunition plant in Lyndhurst), it was quickly rebuilt.

== Growth and severing ==
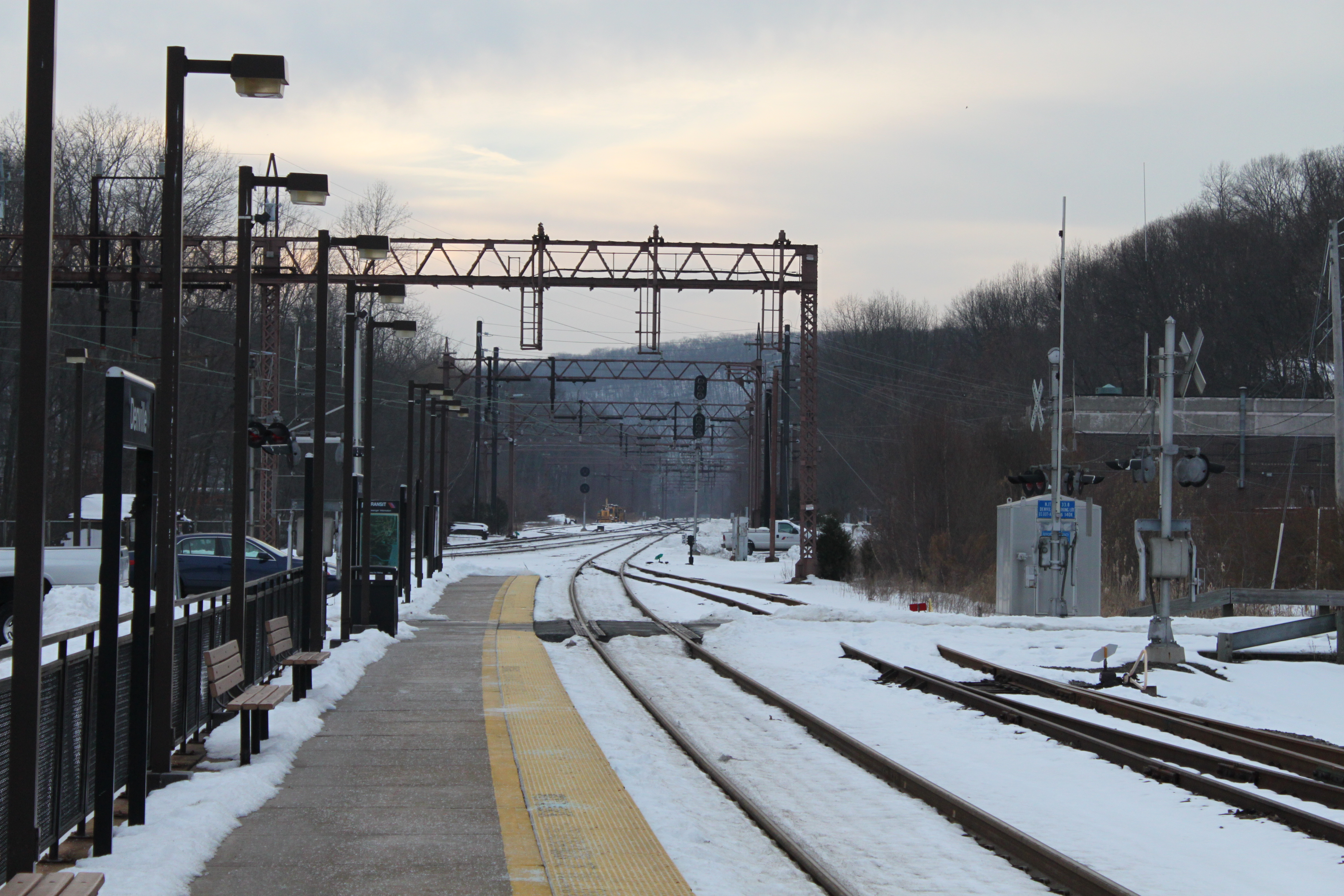
Denville Junction looking westbound in December 2010. Until 1903, the Morristown Line crossed over the Boonton Branch here (through what is now a NJ Transit parking lot off to the left), continuing on to Rockaway (on what would become known as the Rockaway Loop to the right) and then onto East Dover Junction, where the Morristown Line joined into the Boonton Branch on its way to Dover.

The Lackawanna's freight business grew consistently from the time of the opening of the Boonton Branch until the First World War. Growth resumed during the 1920s, necessitating additional tracks being laid on the Boonton Branch (4 in places). The Great Depression substantially hurt the Lackawanna's traffic (similar to most other American railroads), and although traffic saw a large upswing during the Second World War, by the 1950s the financial outlook was bleak. In an attempt to forestall an almost certain bankruptcy, the DL&W merged with the Erie Railroad (its local rival) in 1960. The combined railroad, Erie Lackawanna Railroad (EL), although full of promise, performed poorly for its first few years, losing millions of dollars. During this time, EL management looked for ways to stave off receivership. In a move that was extremely controversial, the New Jersey Highway Department (now NJDOT) moved to buy the right-of-way of the Boonton Branch between Paterson and Totowa, New Jersey from the Erie Lackawanna for Interstate 80 . The highway department's offer was $2 million for the entire width of the right-of-way (which would completely sever the double-track route). The EL, in desperate need of cash, expressed interest, but asked if at least a single track could be retained along the edge of the highway. The highway department agreed it was feasible, but quoted a cost of $2 million to rebuild a single track—an offer that was of no interest to the EL as this would not result in any cash. Public hearings were held where rail advocates criticized the idea of severing the line, but to no avail. Faced with the inevitability of the highway, the EL decided to accept the offered $2 million, rather than risk getting less from an eminent domain seizure.

Since most of the railroad's freight had been shifted off of the former Boonton Branch at Mountain View, with the Erie's Greenwood Lake Branch to be used as the new eastern connection to Hoboken (via a junction between the Boonton Branch and the Greenwood Lake Branch in Secaucus), creating the new Boonton Line for commuter purposes, the impact of the severing of the line initially seemed to be minimal. On paper, the severing of the line only affected the City of Paterson with the closing of the former Lackawanna passenger station located on a hill above the city. Paterson was already served by the former Erie mainline station in downtown Paterson and did not protest the closure. What was lost, and what would eventually come back to haunt the EL, was the previous high-speed freight route.

Indeed, in a decade's time after the severing of the line at Garret Mountain, all long-haul freights would be brought back to the "Lackawanna side". The aforementioned Greenwood Lake Branch had a grade profile similar to that of the Morristown Line—a line which the Morris & Essex Railroad's management had decided to bypass a century earlier. The use of the Greenwood Lake Branch would prove to be an operational headache. And after the EL became part of Conrail in 1976, Conrail specifically would point to the severing of the Garret Mountain section of the Boonton Branch as a key reason in its decision to abandon the Lackawanna Cutoff.

With the opening of the Montclair Connection in 2002, trains over the Boonton Line were rerouted at Montclair over the Montclair Branch, resulting in the renaming of the line to the Montclair–Boonton Line.

The Dover and Delaware River Railroad currently operates a short industrial track, known as the Totowa Industrial Branch, through Wayne and Totowa to serve several industries in the area.

== Station list ==
All mileposts are from Hoboken Terminal.

County	Milepost	Station	Opened	Rebuilt	Closed	Notes
Hudson	3.7	Secaucus	1903–04			Station constructed as part of a new yard replacing the one at Kingsland.
Bergen	7.1	Kingsland		1903–04		Still in use for New Jersey Transit's Main Line.
Bergen	8.2	Lyndhurst		1928		Still in use for New Jersey Transit's Main Line.
Passaic	9.4	Delawanna		1925		Still in use for New Jersey Transit's Main Line.
Passaic	10.1	South Passaic			1902	The station was discontinued when the Passaic depot was moved further south.
Passaic	10.6	Passaic		1901–02		Still in use for New Jersey Transit's Main Line.
Passaic	12.1	Athenia		1903		Renamed from Clifton prior to 1900. Now the Clifton station on New Jersey Transit's Main Line.
Passaic						Note: The Newark Branch ran under the old DLW Boonton line at mile 13.2. In 1963, Paterson Junction was built a few hundred feet northwest of the bridge to merge the two lines, which then runs briefly on a new alignment parallel to the previous Newark tracks (now Kuller Road). This reconnects with old Newark trackage around Hazel Street, merging into the remainder of the original Main Line near Route 80.
Passaic	15.1	Paterson	1928		1963	The Lackawanna Railroad decided the need for three stations in Paterson was unnecessary and instead, replaced with one station in 1928. The original station at Paterson was located 0.5 miles (0.80 km) south. The station was demolished for the Passaic Plan by the Erie-Lackawanna Railroad in 1963.
Passaic	15.9	West Paterson			1903–1906	A turntable was located at this station until being removed between 1903 and 1917.
Passaic	18.2	Totowa–Little Falls		1909	1963	
Passaic	20.8	Mountain View		1909	1963	
Morris	22.9	Lincoln Park			1905	Station formerly known as Beavertown. Station still in use as part of New Jersey Transit's Montclair-Boonton Line.
Morris	25.2	Towaco		1909		Station formerly known as Whitehall until 1905. Station still in use as part of New Jersey Transit's Montclair-Boonton Line.
Morris	27.8	Montville				
Morris	29.2	Boonton		1905		Station relocated from 0.4 miles (0.64 km) west in 1905. Station still in use as part of New Jersey Transit's Montclair-Boonton Line.
Morris	31.2	Mountain Lakes	1912			Station replaced the original Fox Hill station, 0.9 miles (1.4 km) west. Station still in use as part of New Jersey Transit's Montclair-Boonton Line.
Morris	34.9	Denville		1903		The original station was located 0.25 miles (0.40 km) south. Junction with the Morristown Line Station still in use as part of New Jersey Transit's Montclair-Boonton and Morristown lines.
Morris	38.1	Dover		1901		Station still in use as part of New Jersey Transit's Montclair-Boonton and Morristown lines.

== See also ==
- Sussex Branch
