= Saddle River Road =

Saddle River Road may refer to:

- East Saddle River Road (New Jersey)
- County Route 77 (Bergen County, New Jersey), a section of which is known as West Saddle River Road
