= World War II Veterans Memorial Highway =

The World War II Veterans Memorial Highway may refer to:

- M-37 between US 10 and the Lake–Wexford county line in Michigan
- U.S. Route 41 in Wisconsin
- New Jersey Route 208
- Virginia State Route 288
