= County Road 502 =

County Road 502 or County Route 502 may refer to:

- County Route 502 (California)
- County Road 502 (Brevard County, Florida)
- County Route 502 (New Jersey)
