= List of highways numbered 104 =

Route 104, or Highway 104, may refer to:

== Brazil ==
- BR-104

== Canada ==
- New Brunswick Route 104
- Nova Scotia Highway 104 (Trans-Canada Highway)
- Prince Edward Island Route 104
- Quebec Route 104

== China ==
- China National Highway 104

== Costa Rica ==
- National Route 104

== Japan ==
- Japan National Route 104

== Korea, South ==
- Namhae Expressway Branch 2

== Nigeria ==
- F104 highway (Nigeria)

== Philippines ==
- N104 highway (Philippines)

== United Kingdom ==
- A104 road
- B104 road

== United States ==
- U.S. Route 104 (former)
- Alabama State Route 104
- Arkansas Highway 104
  - Arkansas Highway 104 (1926–2000) (former)
- California State Route 104
- Connecticut Route 104
- Florida State Road 104
- Georgia State Route 104
- Illinois Route 104
- Indiana State Road 104
- K-104 (Kansas highway)
- Kentucky Route 104
- Louisiana Highway 104
- Maine State Route 104
- Maryland Route 104
- Massachusetts Route 104
- M-104 (Michigan highway)
- Minnesota State Highway 104
- Missouri Route 104
- Nebraska Highway 104 (1935–1950) (former)
  - Nebraska Highway 104 (1950–1957) (former)
  - Nebraska State Spur 104 (former)
- New Hampshire Route 104
- County Route 104 (Bergen County, New Jersey)
  - County Route S104 (Bergen County, New Jersey)
- New Mexico State Road 104
- New York State Route 104
  - County Route 104 (Cortland County, New York)
  - County Route 104 (Dutchess County, New York)
  - County Route 104 (Fulton County, New York)
  - County Route 104 (Montgomery County, New York)
  - County Route 104 (Nassau County, New York)
  - County Route 104 (Niagara County, New York)
  - County Route 104 (Orleans County, New York)
  - County Route 104 (Rensselaer County, New York)
  - County Route 104 (Suffolk County, New York)
  - County Route 104 (Sullivan County, New York)
  - County Route 104 (Ulster County, New York)
  - County Route 104 (Westchester County, New York)
- North Carolina Highway 104
- Ohio State Route 104
- Oklahoma State Highway 104
- Oregon Route 104
- Pennsylvania Route 104
- Rhode Island Route 104
- Tennessee State Route 104
- Texas State Highway 104 (former)
  - Farm to Market Road 104
- Utah State Route 104
- Vermont Route 104
- Virginia State Route 104 (1923-1928) (former)
  - Virginia State Route 104 (1928-1933) (former)
  - Virginia State Route 104 (1933-1949) (former)
  - Virginia State Route 104 (pre-2001) (former)
- Washington State Route 104
- West Virginia Route 104
- Wisconsin Highway 104

Territories

- Puerto Rico Highway 104
- U.S. Virgin Islands Highway 104

== See also ==
- List of highways numbered 104A
- List of highways numbered 104B
- List of A104 roads
- B104 road
- D104 road
- N104 (France)
- List of national roads in Latvia § P104
- R104 road (Ireland)
- R104 (South Africa)

Preceded by 103	Lists of highways 104	Succeeded by 105
