= List of highways numbered 104A =

The following highways are numbered 104A:

== United States ==
- Maryland Route 104A
- New York State Route 104A
  - County Route 104A (Suffolk County, New York)
- Vermont Route 104A

== See also ==
- List of highways numbered 104
- List of highways numbered 104B
