= County Route 502 (New Jersey) =

Road in Bergen County, New Jersey

County Route 502
- CR 502 highlighted in red

Route information
- Length: 23.79 mi (38.29 km)
- Existed: 1952–present

Major junctions
- West end: CR 504 in Wayne
- Route 208 in Franklin Lakes; CR 507 in Ho-Ho-Kus; Route 17 in Ho-Ho-Kus; G.S. Parkway in Washington Township; CR 503 in Westwood; CR 505 in Closter; CR 501 in Closter
- East end: US 9W in Alpine

Location
- Country: United States
- State: New Jersey
- Counties: Passaic, Bergen

Highway system
- County routes in New Jersey; 500-series routes
← CR 501	→ CR 503

County Route 502 (CR 502) is a county highway in the U.S. state of New Jersey. The highway extends 23.79 miles (38.29 km) from Paterson-Hamburg Turnpike (CR 504) in Wayne to Palisades Boulevard (US 9W) in Alpine.

CR 502 is a very important east–west route in the northern part of Bergen County. North–south travel in the county is available via Route 208 and Route 17, the Garden State Parkway, US 9W and the Palisades Interstate Parkway. In contrast, the only east–west route in the area is Route 4, from Paterson to Fort Lee. Thus, the north area of the county relies heavily on CR 502 for east–west travel. Farthest north, New York State Route 59 (NY 59) or the New York State Thruway can be used as east–west alternatives to CR 502.

CR 502 comprises Berdan Avenue, Breakneck Road, Long Hill Road, Franklin Lake Road, Ewing Avenue, Franklin Avenue, Wyckoff Avenue in Waldwick, a brief concurrency with CR 507 on Franklin Turnpike in Waldwick and Ho-Ho-Kus, Hollywood Avenue, East Saddle River Road, Wearimus Road, Washington Avenue, Broadway, Old Hook Road, High Street, and Closter Dock Road. In the extreme west of Bergen County, CR 502 is mostly a two-lane road with occasional expansions into a four-lane avenue. As it runs through Waldwick, Ho-Ho-Kus, and Washington Township, it is a two-lane road. When CR 502 runs through Westwood, Emerson, and Harrington Park, it is a four-lane highway with jughandles. East of Harrington Park, it is a two-lane road. In the Oradell Reservoir area, CR 502 crosses the only bridge across the reservoir.

== Route description ==
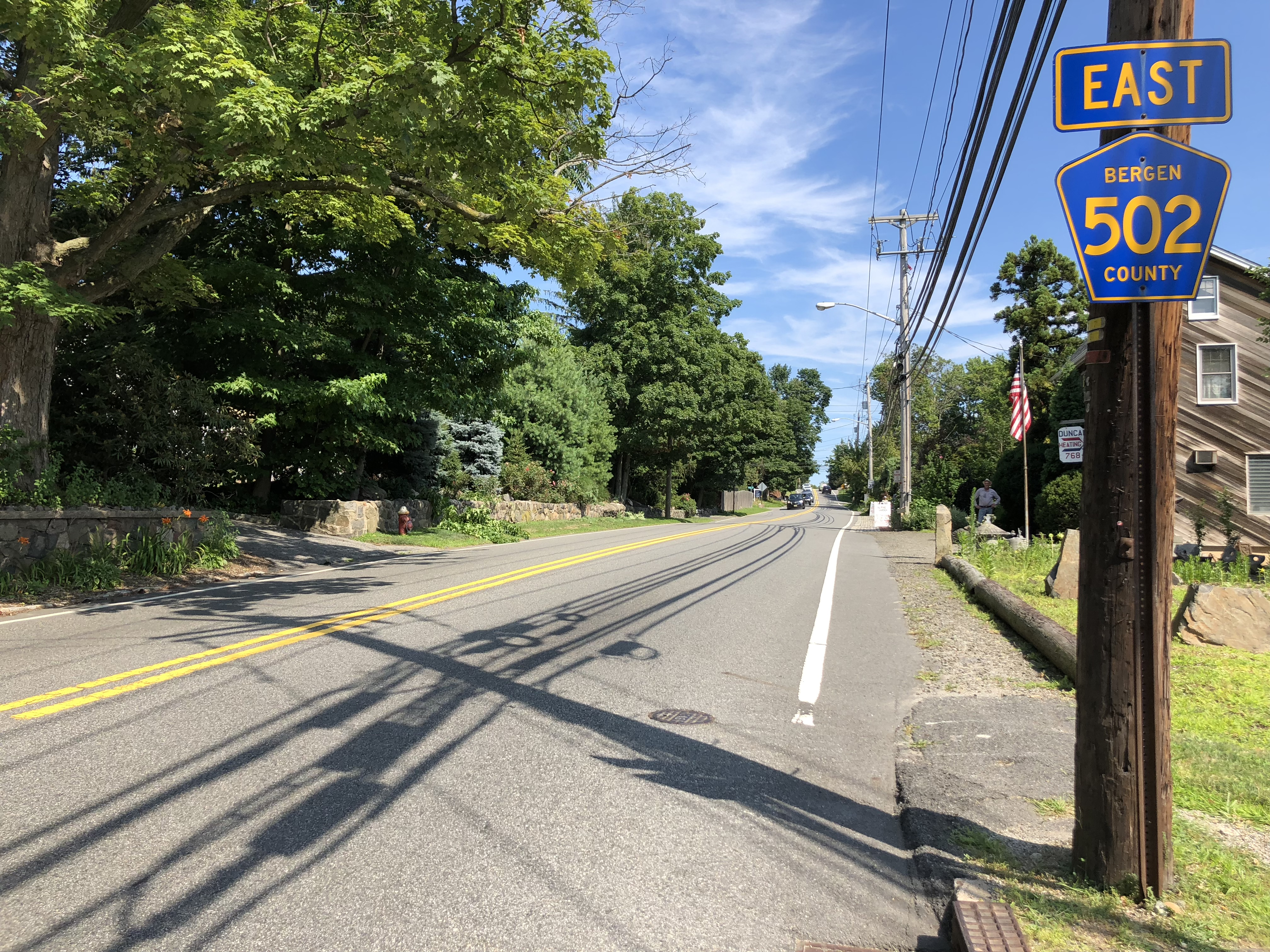
View east along CR 502 at Church Street in Alpine

CR 502 begins at an intersection with CR 504 in Wayne, Passaic County, heading northwest on four-lane undivided Berdan Avenue through commercial areas. The route turns north as it passes between the Point View Reservoir to the west and residential neighborhoods to the east, intersecting CR 681. From here, the road heads into forested areas with some homes, crossing into Bergen County, at which point it forms the border between Oakland to the west and Franklin Lakes to the east as two-lane Breakneck Road. CR 502 fully enters Oakland, where it intersects CR 93 and turns southeast onto Long Hill Road. The route continues into Franklin Lakes and runs through residential areas as Franklin Lake Road, intersecting CR 117 before turning east near Franklin Lake and reaching a traffic circle at CR 89. Upon reaching the CR 97 (Ewing Avenue) intersection, CR 502 turns north onto Ewing Avenue, with CR 93 continuing east on Franklin Lake Road. The road passes more wooded areas of homes as it reaches an interchange with Route 208. A short distance later, the route intersects CR 84 and makes a turn east onto Franklin Avenue. The road crosses into Wyckoff and crosses CR 87 as it heads into the commercial downtown. The route crosses the New York, Susquehanna and Western Railway's New Jersey Subdivision line and passes a mix of homes and businesses as it comes to an intersection with CR 87S and CR 84. CR 502 heads back into wooded residential neighborhoods and enters Waldwick, where it becomes Wyckoff Avenue and reaches a junction with CR 81. The route passes over New Jersey Transit's Main Line/Bergen County Line and widens to four lanes as it comes into businesses areas and reaches an intersection with CR 507. At this point, CR 502 turns south to form a concurrency with CR 507, heading southeast along two-lane Franklin Turnpike. The road heads into Ho-Ho-Kus and passes a mix of homes and businesses before CR 502 splits from CR 507 by heading east on Hollywood Avenue. At this intersection CR 502 Truck heads south along CR 507. CR 502 continues east through wooded residential areas and intersects CR 77 and CR 502 Truck again. A short distance later, the route comes to an interchange with Route 17.

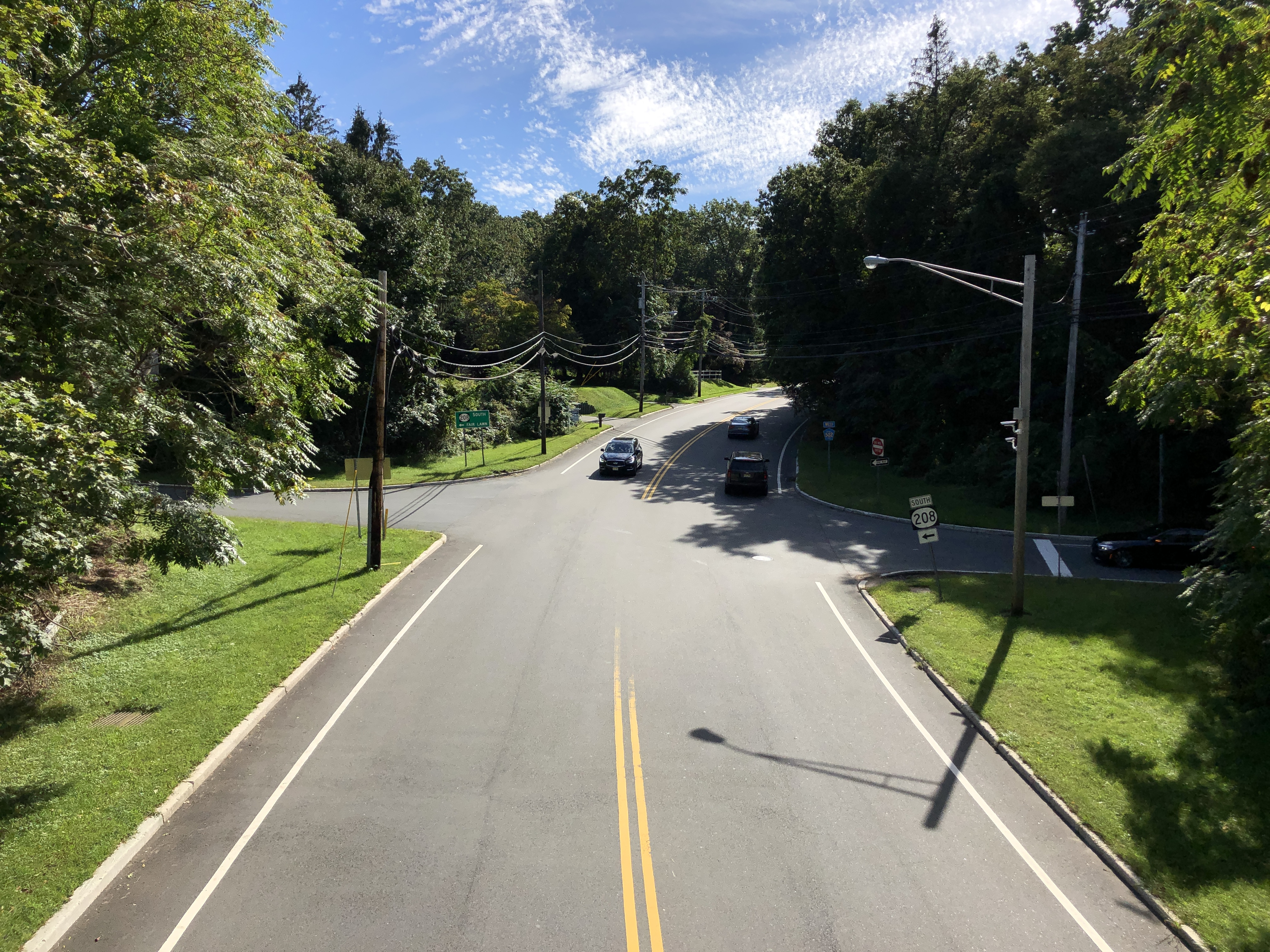
View westbound along CR 502 from Route 208 in Franklin Lakes

From this interchange, CR 502 continues across the Saddle River and reaches an intersection with CR 75, where the route turns south onto East Saddle River Road. The road intersects CR 112 and makes a sharp turn east to a junction with CR 75. At this point, the route becomes Wearimus Road and turns northeast before CR 112 splits to the north on Wearimus Road. CR 502 continues east into Washington Township as Washington Avenue, crossing CR 71 before coming to a partial interchange with the Garden State Parkway that has access to the southbound direction of the parkway. The road crosses CR 63 and continues through residential neighborhoods, crossing into Westwood. Here, the route intersects CR 110 and CR 59 before crossing New Jersey Transit's Pascack Valley Line and meeting CR 104 in the commercial downtown. At this point, CR 502 turns southeast onto Broadway and runs to the east of the Pascack Valley Line, passing the Westwood Station. The road curves east away from the railroad tracks, widening to four lanes as it comes to the CR 503 junction. After this, CR 502 becomes a stroad as Old Hook Road and continues through commercial areas, briefly becoming a divided highway at the entrance to the Hackensack University Medical Center at Pascack Valley. The road enters Emerson at the Main Street intersection and runs through the Emerson Woods Preserve area before coming into Harrington Park and intersecting CR 104. CR 502 crosses the Oradell Reservoir into Closter, the only road to cross the reservoir and saves drivers from having to go around it. It becomes High Street as it crosses CSX's River Subdivision and comes to the CR 39 junction. From here, the route narrows to two lanes and continues through wooded residential areas, crossing CR 505 before turning southeast and crossing CSX's Northern Running Track. At the CR 102 intersection, CR 502 turns south onto Closter Dock Road, with CR 104 continuing along High Street. The route intersects CR 41 and curves southeast onto Old Closter Dock Road, coming to a junction with CR 35 before crossing CR 501. At the Anderson Avenue intersection, CR 502 crosses into Alpine and continues to its eastern terminus at US 9W.

== Major intersections ==
County	Location	mi	km	Destinations	Notes
Passaic	Wayne	0.00	0.00	CR 504 (Hamburg Turnpike) – Paterson, Pompton Lakes	Western terminus
Bergen	Franklin Lakes	6.92	11.14	Route 208 – Fair Lawn, Oakland	Interchange
Bergen	Waldwick	11.29	18.17	CR 507 north (Franklin Turnpike) – Allendale, Ramsey	Western end of CR 507 concurrency
Bergen	Ho-Ho-Kus	11.88	19.12	CR 507 south (Franklin Turnpike) to Route 17 – Glen Rock	Eastern end of CR 507 concurrency
Bergen	Ho-Ho-Kus	12.50	20.12	Route 17 – Suffern, Paramus	Interchange
Bergen	Washington Township	14.79– 14.84	23.80– 23.88	G.S. Parkway south	Exit 168 on G.S. Parkway
Bergen	Westwood	17.50	28.16	CR 503 (Kinderkamack Road)	
Bergen	Closter	20.38	32.80	CR 505 (Knickerbocker Road) – Englewood, Harrington Park, Norwood	
Bergen	Closter	21.62	34.79	CR 501 (Piermont Road) – Norwood, Rockleigh, Demarest, Cresskill	
Bergen	Alpine	23.79	38.29	US 9W – New York State Line, Englewood, Governor Mario M. Cuomo Bridge, George Washington Bridge	Eastern terminus
1.000 mi = 1.609 km; 1.000 km = 0.621 mi: Concurrency terminus; Tolled

== CR 502 Truck ==
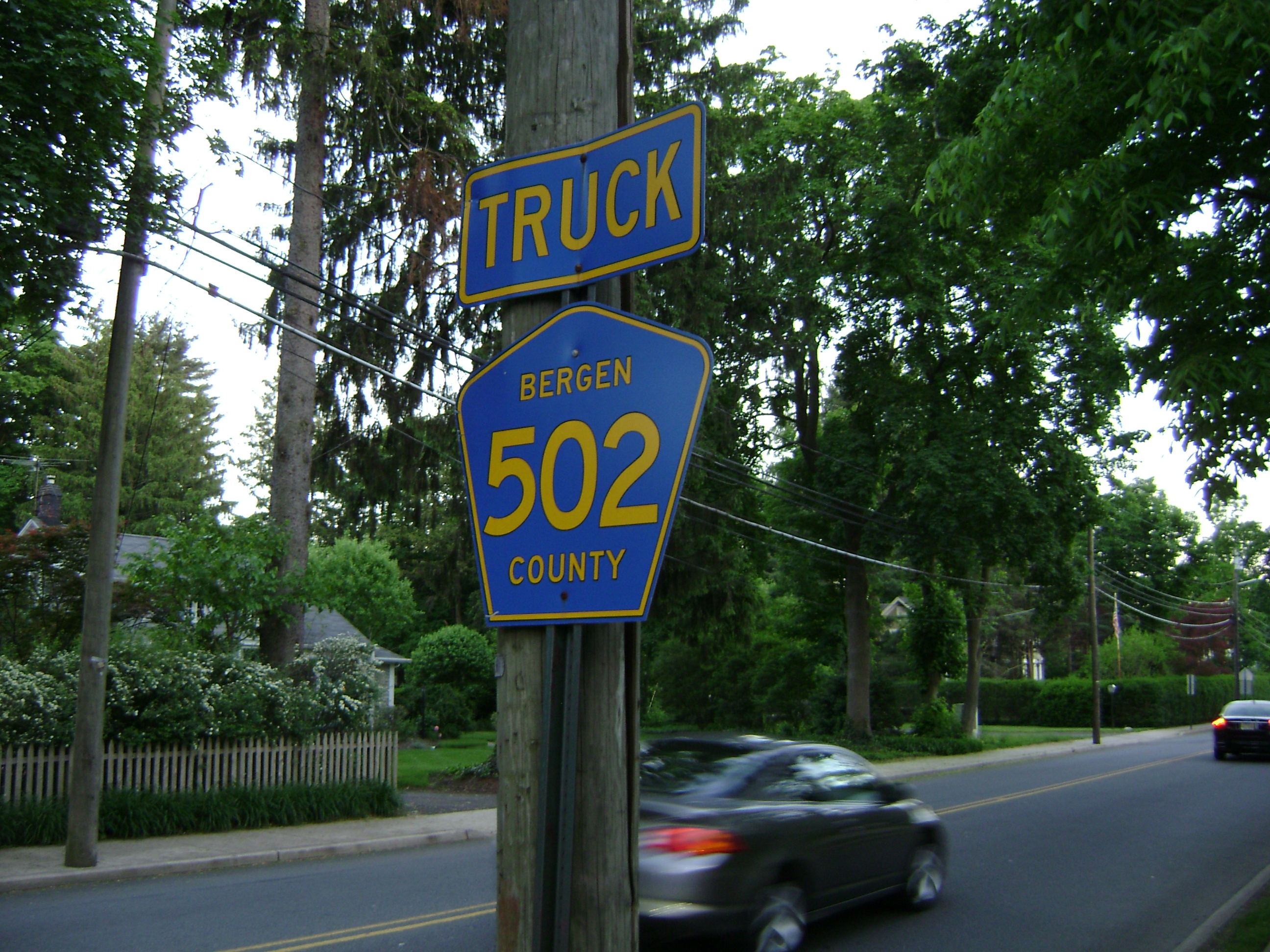
CR 502 Truck (Sheridan Avenue) in Ho-Ho-Kus, New Jersey.

County Route 502 Truck
- Location: Ho-Ho-Kus
- Length: 0.75 mi (1,210 m)

County Route 502 Truck is a bypass of a section of CR 502 in Ho-Ho-Kus, New Jersey. The route travels 0.75 miles, following part of CR 77 and CR 507. It was designated so that trucks could detour around a section of CR 502 westbound where trucks have been banned due to a steeply graded intersection. CR 502 Truck, while signed, is not an official route, and it has no publicly available straight line diagram. However, its length may be determined by utilizing the straight line diagrams for CR 77 and CR 507.

The road begins at the intersection of CR 502 (Hollywood Avenue) and CR 77 (Sheridan Avenue) in Ho-Ho-Kus. Here, trucks must make a left onto CR 77 to avoid a steep incline at the upcoming intersection of CR 502 and CR 507. Traveling south into downtown Ho-Ho-Kus, CR 502 Truck follows the same route as CR 77 until coming to a skewed intersection with Franklin Turnpike and North Maple Avenue. To the east, CR 62 enters the intersection as Franklin Turnpike. Ahead and somewhat to the east, CR 507 emerges as North Maple Ave and turns to follow Franklin Turnpike to the west. CR 502 Truck makes a right turn at the above-mentioned intersection and follows CR 507 up a hill for 0.39 miles until it reunites with CR 502 at an intersection with Hollywood Avenue. CR 502 then continues in the same direction as CR 507.

Major intersections
The entire route is in Ho-Ho-Kus, Bergen County.

mi	km	Destinations	Notes
0.00	0.00	CR 502 (Hollywood Avenue) / CR 507 north (Franklin Turnpike)	Western terminus; western end of CR 507 concurrency
0.39	0.63	CR 507 south (Franklin Turnpike) CR 77 begins	Eastern end of CR 507 concurrency; southern terminus of CR 67
0.75	1.21	CR 77 north (Sheridan Avenue) / CR 502 (Hollywood Avenue)	Eastern terminus; eastern end of CR 77 concurrency
1.000 mi = 1.609 km; 1.000 km = 0.621 mi: Concurrency terminus
