= County Route 507 (New Jersey) =

Highway in New Jersey

County Route 507
- CR 507 highlighted in red

Route information
- Length: 28.37 mi (45.66 km)
- Existed: 1952–present

Major junctions
- South end: CR 508 in Harrison
- Route 7 in Kearny; Route 3 in Lyndhurst; US 46 in Elmwood Park; I-80 in Elmwood Park; Route 4 in Elmwood Park; Route 208 in Fair Lawn; CR 502 from Waldwick to Ho-Ho-Kus; Route 17 in Ramsey
- North end: US 202 at the New York state line

Location
- Country: United States
- State: New Jersey
- Counties: Hudson, Bergen

Highway system
- County routes in New Jersey; 500-series routes
← CR 506	→ CR 508

County Route 507 (CR 507) is a county highway in the U.S. state of New Jersey. The highway extends 28.37 mi (45.66 km) from CR 508 (Harrison Avenue) in Harrison to the New York state line in Mahwah. Between Ho-Ho-Kus and Mahwah, this highway is known as Franklin Turnpike. At its northern terminus, County Route 507 continues north into New York as Orange Avenue, which is a portion of U.S. Route 202 (US 202).

== Route description ==
=== Harrison to Carlton Hill ===
County Route 507 begins at an intersection with County Route 508 (Harrison Avenue) in the community of Harrison, New Jersey. The highway progresses northward as Schuyler Street, weaving northward through downtown Harrison. A short distance later, Route 507 passes West Hudson Park and turns to the northeast, entering a mainly commercial district of Harrison. The route soon enters Kearny, the westernmost district in Hudson County and its Arlington district. There, Route 507 continues as Schuyler Avenue, intersecting with the Gunnel Oval, which leads to Kearny Playground. After an intersection with Midland Avenue, the highway crosses Norfolk Southern's Boonton Line through Arlington, which formerly carried NJ Transit trains until it was abandoned on September 20, 2002. After crossing the tracks, County Route 507 continues through a long residential stretch in Arlington, soon forking with the Arlington Memorial Park, a cemetery at Prospect Place in Kearny. County Route 507 parallels the cemetery, until the intersection with New Jersey Route 7 and County Route 506 (the Belleville Turnpike). Here, County Route 507 turns westward along Route 7 and Route 506 while Schuyler Avenue continues northward as Bergen County Route 11. Routes 7, 506 and 507 head west, crossing through a mix of residential homes and local businesses and soon intersecting with Ridge Road (New Jersey Route 17) at its southern terminus on the Kearny / North Arlington border. From there, the surroundings become vastly residential and at the intersection with Hudson County Route 699 (Passaic Avenue), Route 507 turns northward as River Road along the right-of-way and away from Routes 7 and 506.

From the intersection, County Route 507 continues north through North Arlington, crossing a mix of industrial, commercial and residential residences as it parallels the Passaic River. Soon after, the route passes the local football and baseball fields, approaching the waterfront of the Passaic. County Route 507 soon passes a waterfront park and curves to the northeast away from the Passaic at Riverside County Park. Near the intersection with Bergen County Route 26 (Jauncey Avenue), the route curves to the northwest and becomes Riverside Avenue. County Route 507 continues to parallel Riverside County Park until Park Street, where the park terminates, and after entering Lyndhurst, the highway intersects with County Route 28 (Kingsland Avenue, opposite Park Ave Bridge over the Passaic River). County Route 507 continues northward along Riverside Avenue, passing residences and a large local park before intersecting with County Route 30 (Park Ave) at a fork in the roadway. The route first heads northward and reaches the Passaic River waterfront, where it turns to the northeast and parallels the river before crossing under NJ Transit's Main Line. County Route 507 enters Rutherford after crossing County Route 30 (Rutherford Avenue), County Route 507 than intersects with New Jersey Route 3 westbound at a partial cloverleaf interchange. There is no interchange for Route 3 eastbound along County Route 507, which continues along the Passaic riverside through a largely residential area. At the intersection with Donaldson Avenue, Route 507 becomes known as Jackson Avenue. After making a skip to the northeast, the road turns back to the northeast through a wooded residential district. At the intersection with County Route 34 (Union Avenue), County Route 507 passes some commercial businesses, but remains highly residential afterwards. After the intersection with County Route 32 (Erie Avenue), the highway crosses the former Erie Railroad main line and the site of the former Carlton Hill station. Soon after, County Route 507 passes the former Royce Chemical Standard and Bleachery, where it changes names to Carlton Avenue for entering East Rutherford.

=== East Rutherford to Ho-Ho-Kus ===
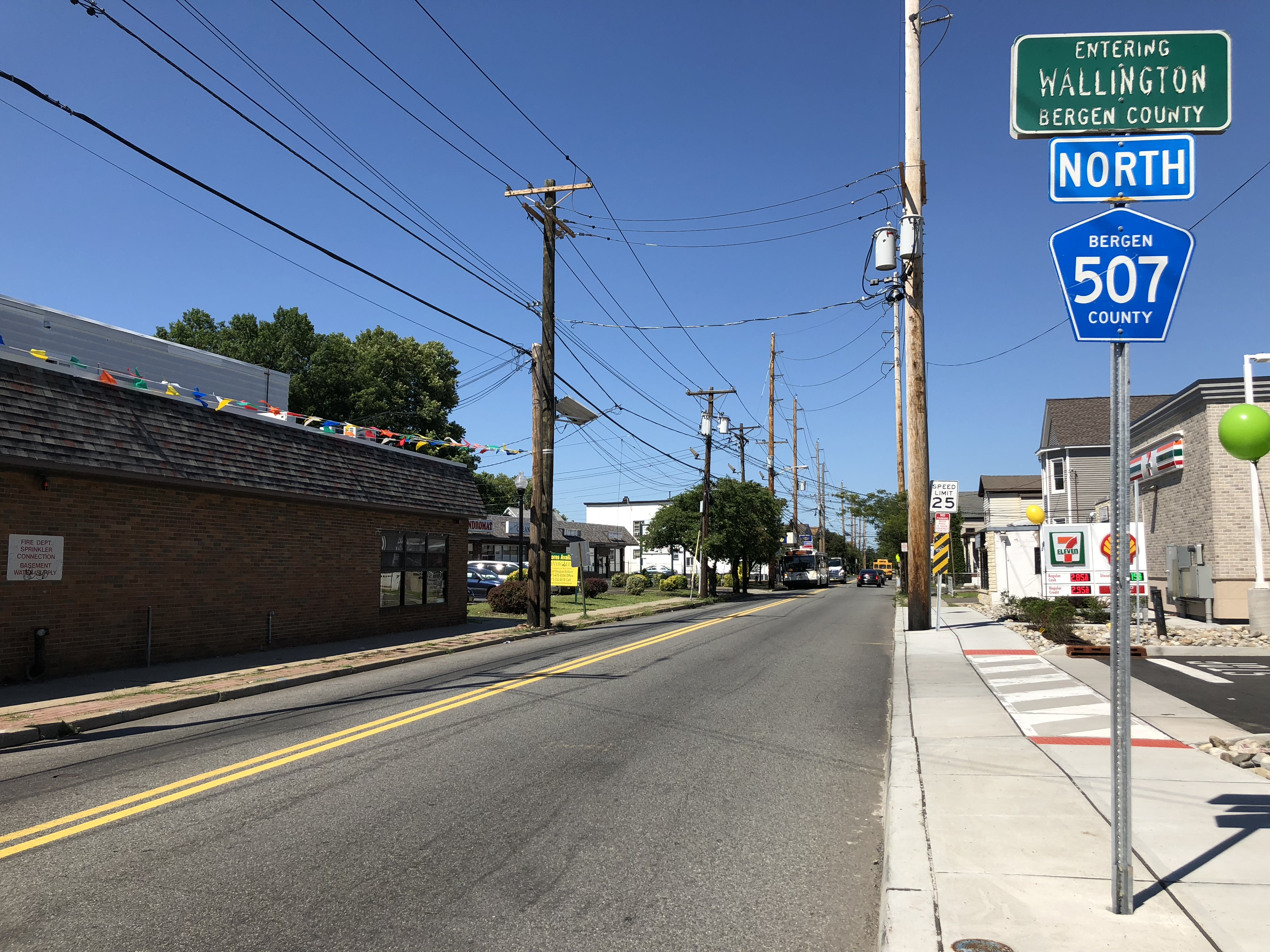
View north along CR 507 just north of Paterson Avenue in Wallington

In East Rutherford, County Route 507 turns to the northwest along Carlton Avenue, passing a mixture of residential and commercial residences as the route progresses westward. At the intersection with Locust Avenue, the highway turned northeastward along Locust, intersecting with County Route 14 (Paterson Avenue) in East Rutherford. County Route 507 continues northward, passing local residences for several blocks, until reaching an intersection with Main Avenue near the Passaic River. Locust Avenue crosses the Passaic locally maintained while County Route 507 turns eastward and heads along Main Avenue, which parallels the Passaic. At a fork, the highway turns to the northwest along Midland Avenue while Main Avenue becomes County Route 61. The highway continues northward along Midland, passing local factories and intersects with River Drive, where County Route 507 turns westward along River while Midland Avenue continues northward as County Route 67. County Route 507 continues westward alongside the Passaic River as a two-lane boulevard through now the city of Garfield. The residences soon dissipate, leaving way for commercial businesses and soon intersecting with County Route 42 (Outwater Lane). However, County Route 507 continues northwestward alongside the Passaic, passing a local waterfall and local residences as it gradually turns northward, crossing under the Garden State Parkway soon after. A short distance from the Parkway, the highway enters a partial cloverleaf interchange with U.S. Route 46, where County Route 507 enters a large commercial district just south of Interstate 80. Interstate 80 interchanges with Route 507 and continues northward, crossing the New York, Susquehanna and Western Railway's New Jersey Subdivision line near Summit Avenue. The highway continues northwestward as a mix of residential and commercial businesses partially interchanging with New Jersey Route 4 in now Elmwood Park. County Route 507 continues northward along River Drive, weaving its way through many residences and soon a local church. Near the intersection with Berdan Avenue, the commercial district returns to Route 507.

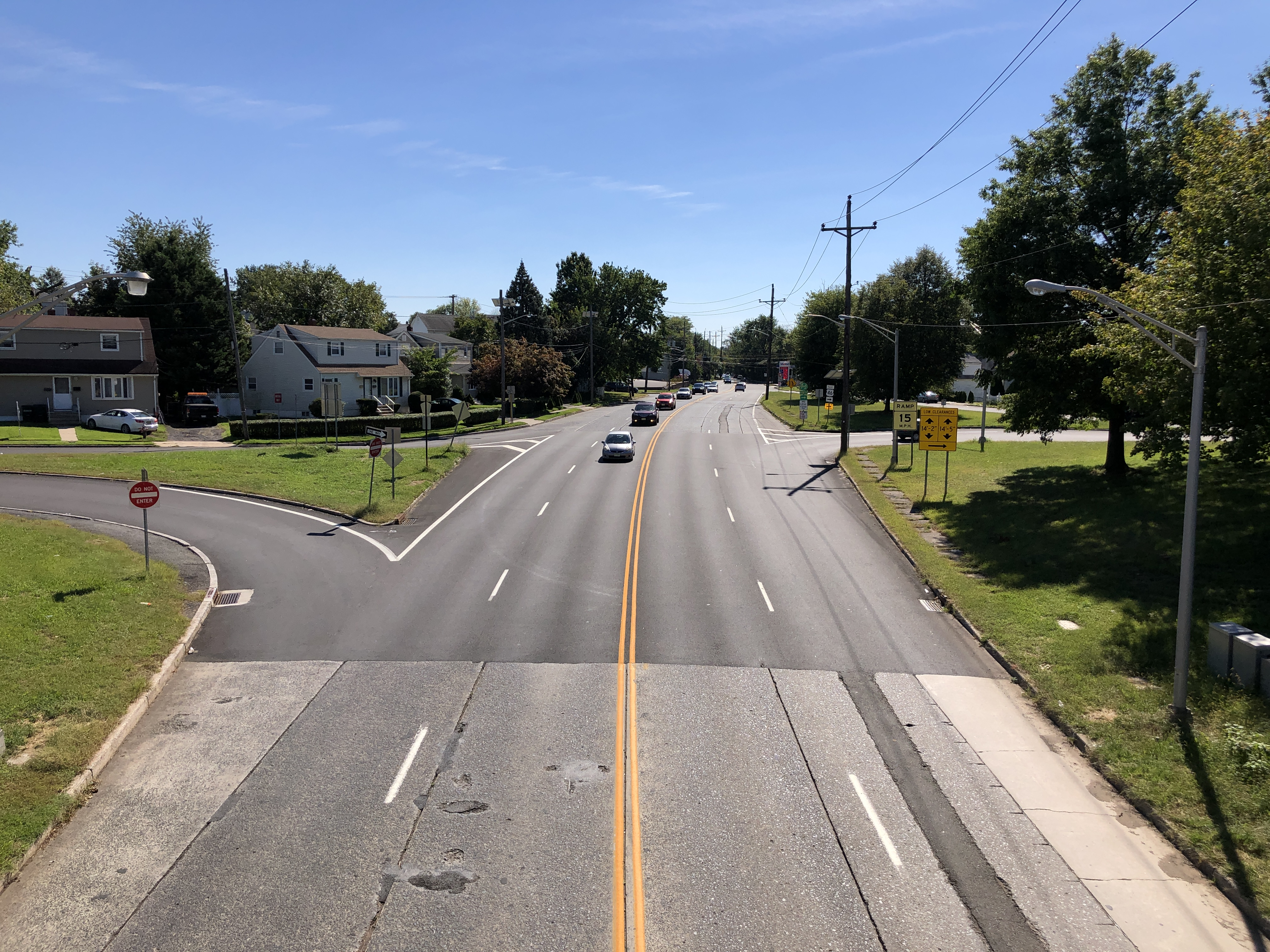
View southbound along CR 507 from US 46 in Elmwood Park

The route continues northward, passing through Fair Lawn as a four-lane boulevard with businesses and industry paralleling. At an intersection with County Route 77 (Maple Avenue), County Route 507 turns eastward along Maple, following a long stretch of businesses as it progresses northward. Soon after, the highway parallels Fair Lawn Cemetery and Terrace Park before interchanging with New Jersey Route 208 on a partial cloverleaf interchange. South Maple Avenue continues northward as a residential highway, turning from the north to the northeast into the community of Glen Rock, where it crosses New Jersey Transit's Bergen County Line. In Glen Rock, County Route 507 intersects with County Route 134 (Rock Road), which provides access to both of Glen Rock's train stations, nearby Glen Rock-Boro Hall and the Main Line station a short distance further. South Maple Avenue continues northward through the residential districts of Glen Rock, intersecting soon with County Route 79 (Ackerman Avenue). After turning northeastward once again, County Route 507 intersects with County Route S-79 (Prospect Street) and through a largely residential portion of now Ridgewood. The route the enters downtown Ridgewood, intersecting with County Route 80 for a short distance, which turns westward on Franklin Avenue soon after. In downtown Ridgewood, County Route 507 passes the free public library and municipal building, the Veterans Memorial Park and Graydon Park before intersecting with County Route 110 (Linwood Avenue) soon after. County Route 507, now known as North Maple Avenue, continues northward, paralleling a nearby brook past an intersection with County Route 82. After curving to the northeast at Undercliff Court, the highway continues north through Ridgewood until crossing 1st Street, where it enters the town of Ho-Ho-Kus. In Ho-Ho-Kus, County Route 507 passes through downtown, soon intersecting with County Route 77 (Sheridan Avenue) and County Route 62 (Franklin Turnpike). Route 507 turns westward along the Franklin Turnpike, providing County Route 62's western terminus, paralleling Ho-Ho-Kus Brook and providing access to Ho-Ho-Kus train station by way of Warren Avenue. Soon after, County Route 507 intersects with County Route 502 (Hollywood Avenue) and becomes concurrent.

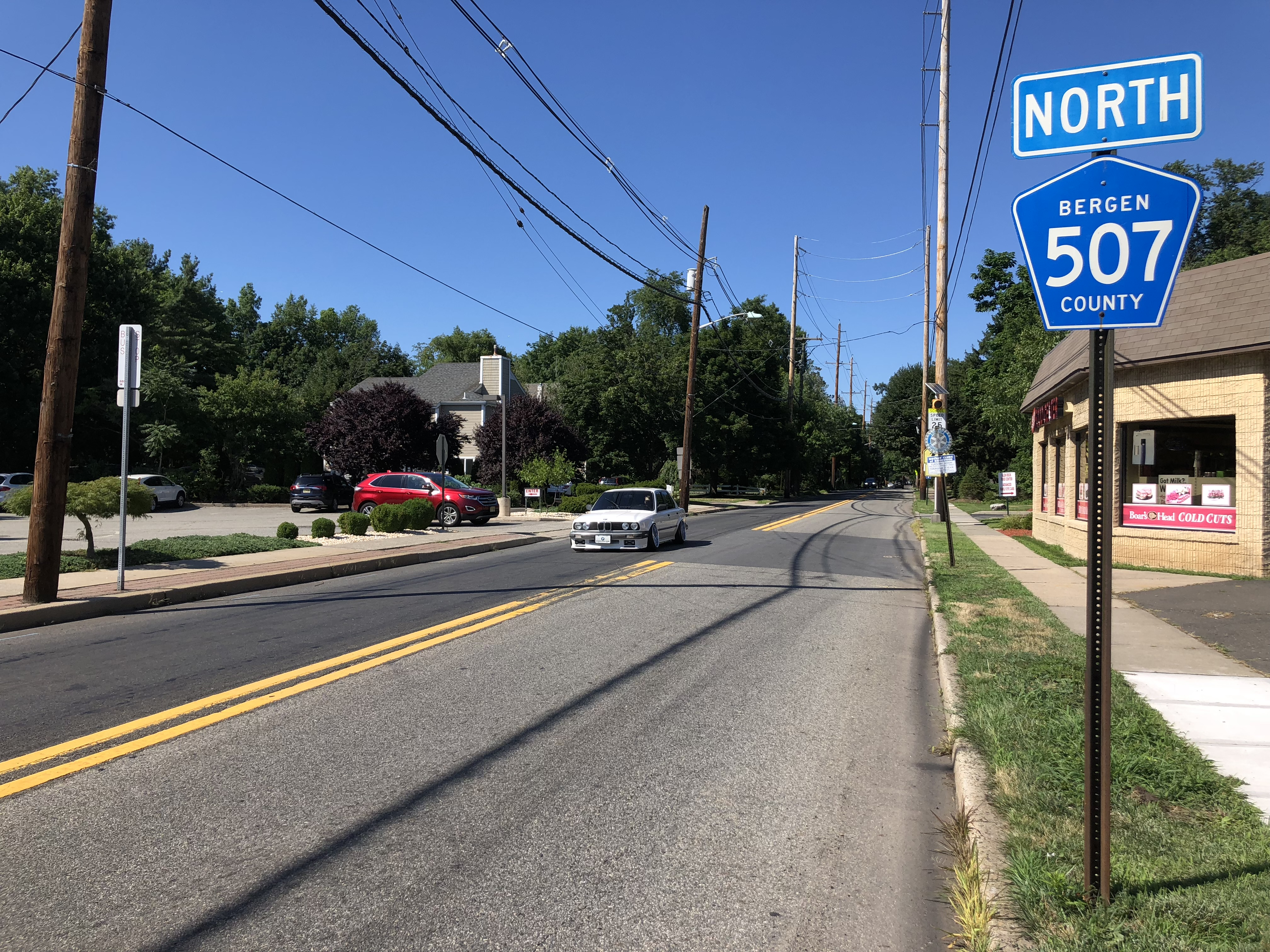
County Route 507 northbound in Glen Rock

=== Waldwick to Mahwah ===
County Route 507 and County Route 502 continue through Ho-Ho-Kus as a two-lane residential highway along the Franklin Turnpike. They soon pass a local cemetery and enter the downtown of Waldwick, where County Route 502 forks to the west via Wyckoff Avenue. County Route 507 continues northward along Franklin Turnpike, heading through downtown Waldwick as a four-lane arterial, passing east of the local train station. The highway turns to the northwest once again, returning to the residential surroundings until crossing into Allendale near Mackay Avenue, where it becomes commercial once again. County Route 507, a two-lane local street, soon intersects with County Route 101 (Orchard Street) in Allendale, and after crossing local parkland, intersects with County Route 90 (Allendale Avenue). County Route 507 continues northward along the Franklin Turnpike through a wooded residential district, which soon dissipates to mostly forestry on the northbound side until County Route 81 (Crescent Avenue), where it becomes residential once again. At the intersection with Arlton Avenue, County Route 507 crosses northward from Allendale and into the borough of Ramsey. Soon after, the Franklin Turnpike continues northward near Wyckoff Lake and the residential homes nearby. As the highway enters downtown Ramsey, County Route 507 intersects with County Route 87 (East Main Street) and County Route S-81 (Lake Street) and soon after County Route 83 (Airmount Avenue) through a large commercial/residential mix area. The highway continues northward through a now largely residential district, intersecting with New Jersey Route 17 southbound and soon crossing over a two-lane bridge, which soon intersects with Route 17 northbound. County Route 507 continues northward along the Franklin Turnpike through the northern reaches of Ramsey, intersecting with Spring Street. The highway becomes commercial once again, intersecting with Orchard Street, where the route crosses the borough line into Mahwah.

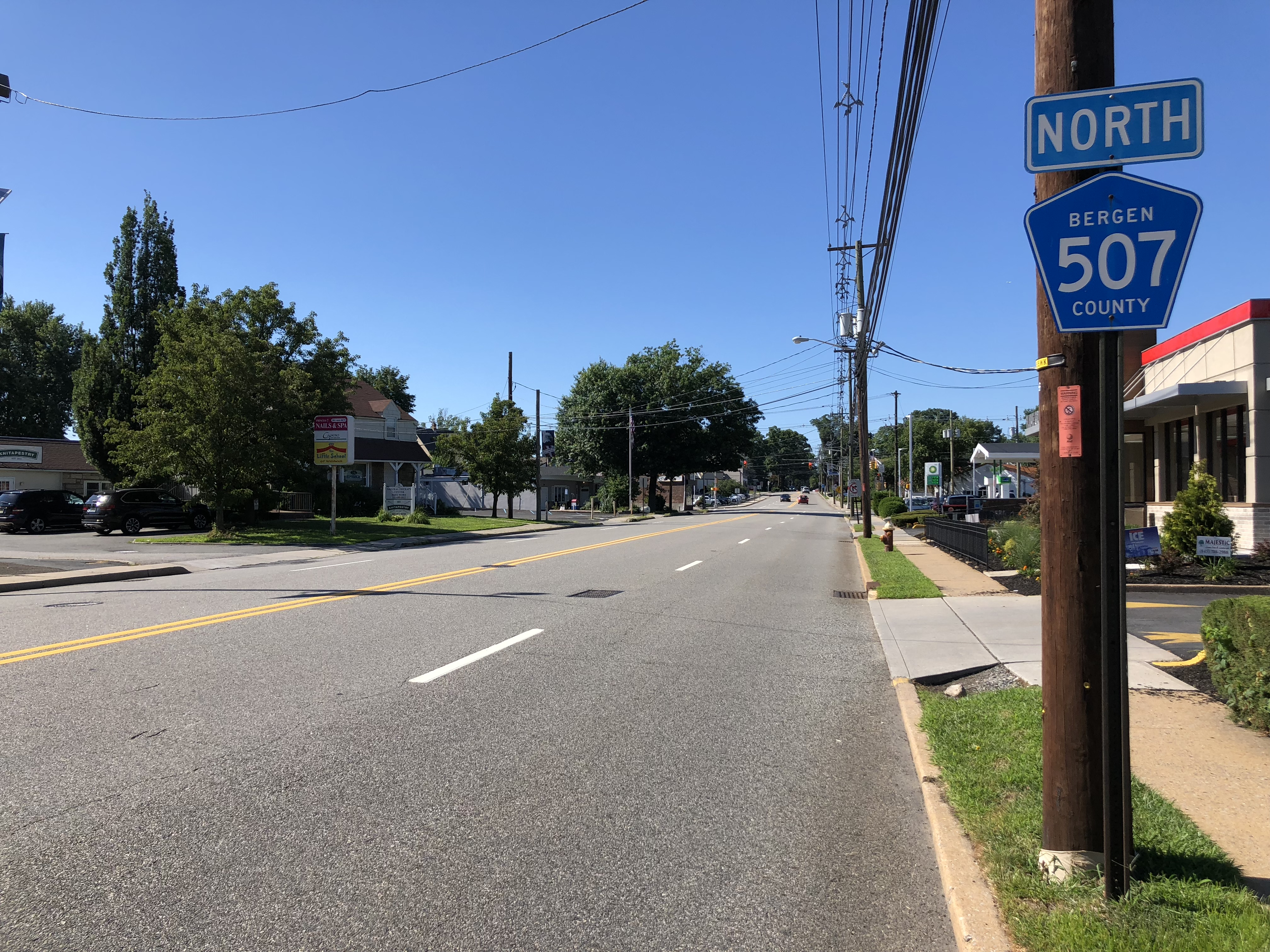
County Route 507 northbound past County Route 502 in Waldwick

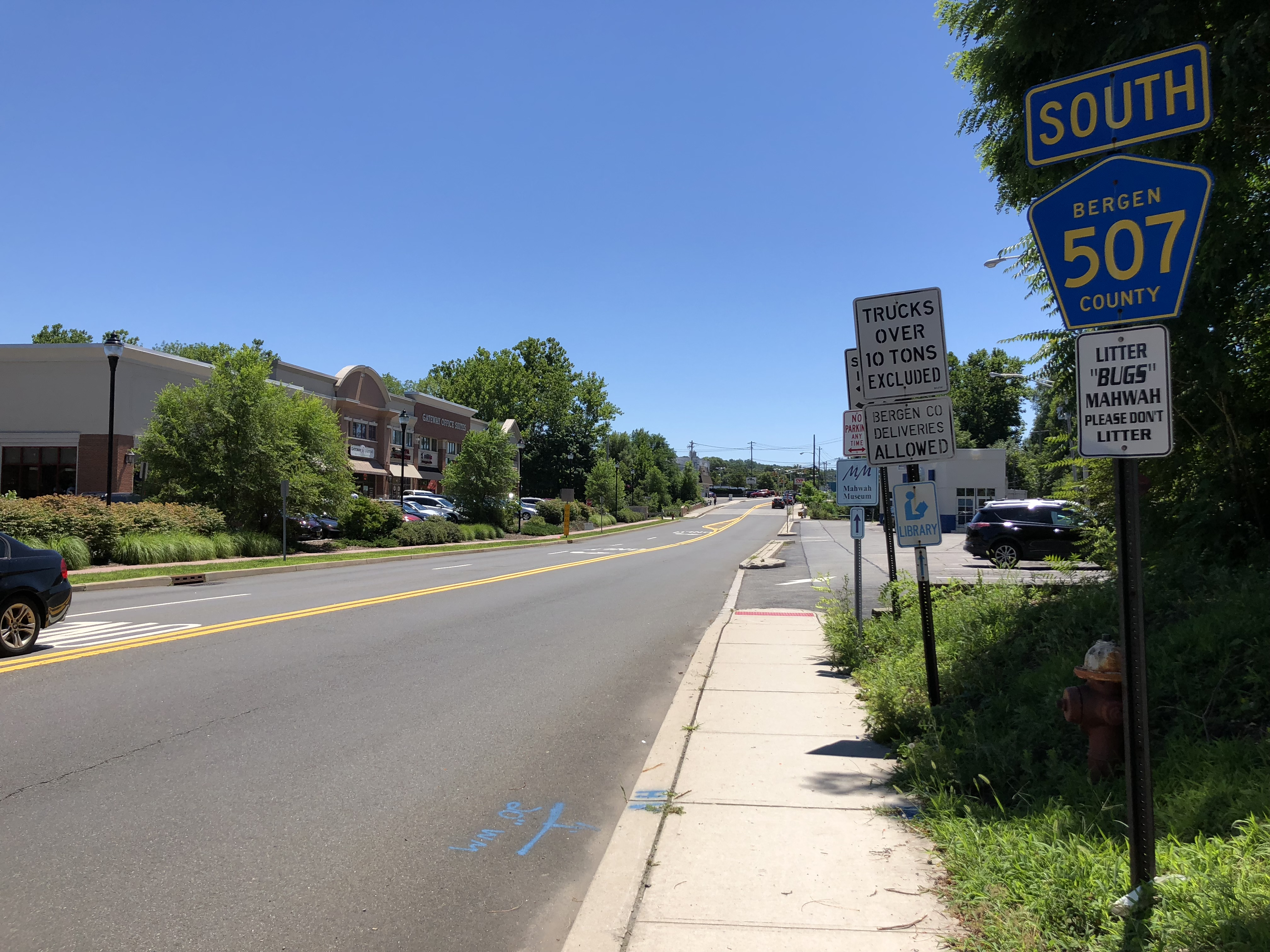
CR 507's first southbound reassurance shield after its intersection with US 202 just mere feet south of the NY/NJ state line

In Mahwah, County Route 507 continues northwestward along the Franklin Turnpike, passing a large industrial district and nearby local residences. The road passes east of some local residential complexes, intersecting with County Route 100 (Ramapo Avenue) in downtown Mahwah. Ramapo Avenue heads westward to the Mahwah train station and the business district. County Route 507 continues northward, paralleling its own business district and soon paralleling the Main Line, maintained by New Jersey Transit. The final stretch of the Franklin Turnpike is mostly commercial, passing several local businesses and intersecting with U.S. Route 202 just south of the state border. This provides the northern terminus of County Route 507 and the Franklin Turnpike continues for a short 0.03 miles (0.048 km) long stretch to the New York state line in Mahwah.

== History ==
The Franklin Turnpike was chartered in 1806 to connect the Saddle River at Ho-Ho-Kus to the Orange Turnpike at the New York state line, opening up commerce to northwestern Bergen County. It was built on an earlier path laid out by Robert Erskine. The road was turned over to the public in 1854. In the 20th century, this road was included in two auto trails- the Liberty Highway and the West Shore Route to Albany. It was then incorporated into the state highway system, first through Route 17N, and then as a temporary alignment of Route 2 before the construction of modern-day Route 17. This highway, along with the rest of the former Route 17N north of Hackensack, was assigned as Bergen County Route 62. With the adoption of CR 507, this designation was largely removed from the Franklin Turnpike. This also truncated CR 77 and CR 69.

== Major intersections ==
County	Location	mi	km	Destinations	Notes
Hudson	Harrison	0.00	0.00	CR 508 (Harrison Avenue) to N.J. Turnpike (I-95) / G.S. Parkway	Southern terminus
Hudson–Bergen county line	Kearny–North Arlington line	2.21	3.56	Route 7 east to N.J. Turnpike (I-95) – Jersey City	Southern end of Route 7 concurrency
Hudson–Bergen county line	Kearny–North Arlington line	2.73	4.39	Route 17 north (Ridge Road) – Rutherford, Suffern	Southern terminus of Route 17
Hudson–Bergen county line	Kearny–North Arlington line	3.22	5.18	Route 7 west – Belleville	Northern end of Route 7 concurrency
Bergen	Rutherford	6.29	10.12	Route 3 to N.J. Turnpike (I-95) / Route 17 – Clifton, Lincoln Tunnel	Interchange
Bergen	Elmwood Park	12.19	19.62	US 46 to G.S. Parkway south / Route 20 north / Route 21 south – Clifton	Interchange
Bergen	Elmwood Park	12.72	20.47	I-80 to Route 20	Exit 61 on I-80
Bergen	Elmwood Park	14.03	22.58	Route 4 east – Teaneck	Interchange
Bergen	Fair Lawn	16.69	26.86	Route 208 – Oakland, Paramus	Interchange
Bergen	Ho-Ho-Kus	20.76	33.41	CR 502 east (Hollywood Avenue)	Southern end of CR 502 concurrency
Bergen	Waldwick	21.35	34.36	CR 502 west (Wyckoff Avenue) – Wyckoff, Franklin Lakes	Northern end of CR 502 concurrency
Bergen	Ramsey	25.63	41.25	Route 17 – Suffern	Interchange
Bergen	Mahwah	28.34	45.61	US 202 south – Franklin Lakes, Oakland	Southern end of US 202 concurrency
Bergen	Mahwah	28.37	45.66	US 202 east (Orange Avenue)	Continuation into New York; northern end of US 202 concurrency
1.000 mi = 1.609 km; 1.000 km = 0.621 mi: Concurrency terminus
