= List of highways numbered 104B =

The following highways are numbered 104B:

== United States ==
- New York State Route 104B
- Vermont Route 104B (former)

== See also ==
- List of highways numbered 104
- List of highways numbered 104A
