= List of A104 roads =

This is a list of roads designated A104. Roads entries are sorted in the countries alphabetical order.

- A104 road (England), the road from Islington Green to Epping in London, England
- A104 road (Kenya), the road from Nairobi, Kenya to the Tanzanian border at Namanga on the route to Arusha and Dar es Salaam
- A104 motorway (France), part of the Francilienne, a road around Paris

== See also ==
- List of highways numbered 104
