= A104 =

A104, A.104 or A-104 may refer to:

- A104 road, a list of roads
- AS-104, a 1965 spaceflight in the Apollo program
- Aero A.104, a 1937 Czechoslovak biplane light bomber and reconnaissance aircraft
- Agusta A.104, a 1960 Italian prototype light helicopter
- RFA Eaglesdale (A104), a 1941 Royal Fleet Auxiliary fleet tanker ship
