= List of county routes in Bergen County, New Jersey =

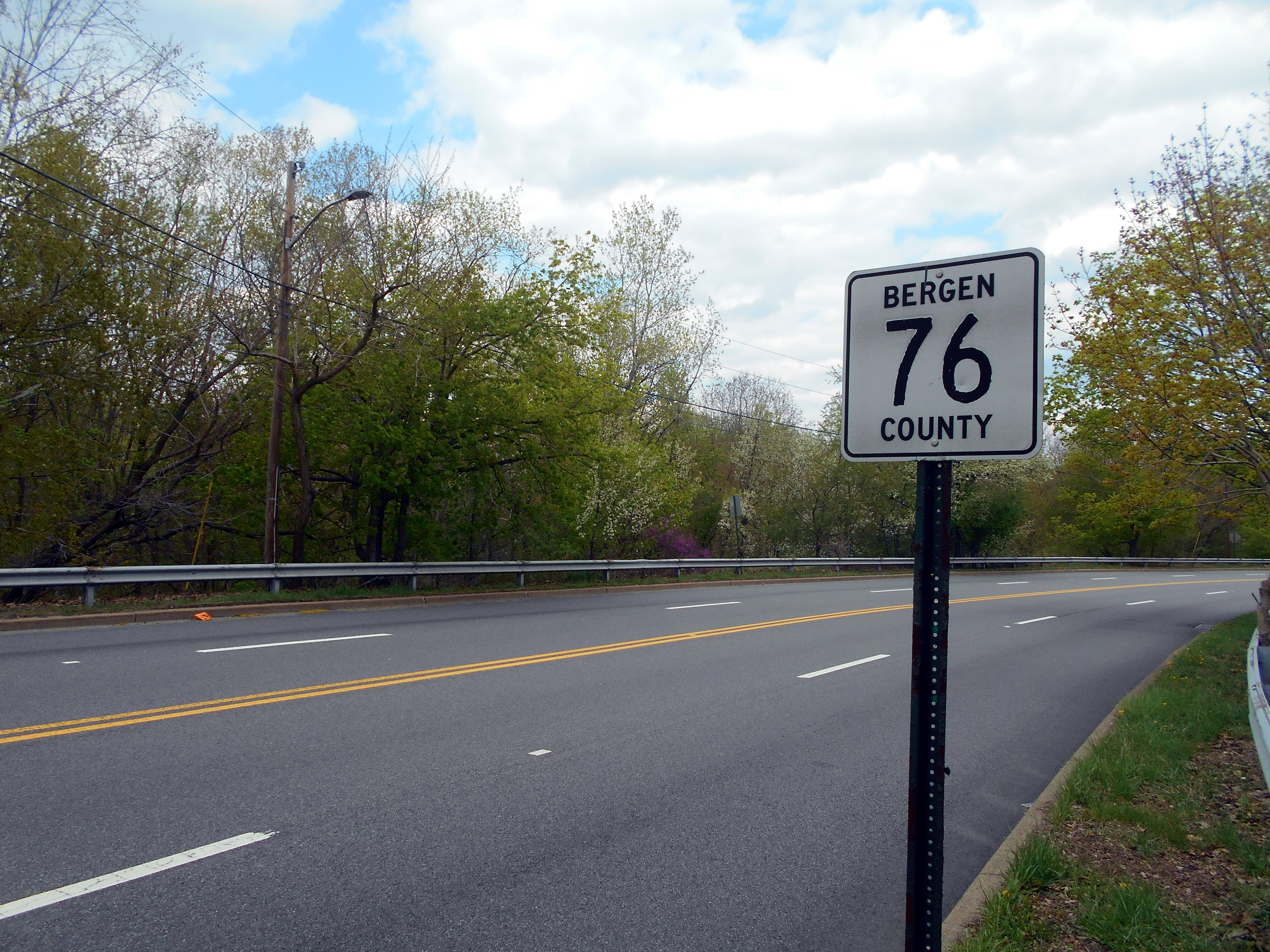
Signage for CR 76 in Paramus, an example of county route signage in Bergen County

The following is a list of county routes in Bergen County in the U.S. state of New Jersey. For more information on the county route system in New Jersey as a whole, including its history, see County routes in New Jersey.

== 500-series county routes ==
In addition to those listed below, the following 500-series county routes serve Bergen County:

- CR 501, CR 502, CR 503, CR 504, CR 505, CR 507

== Other county routes ==
Number	Length (mi)	Length (km)	Southern or western terminus	Northern or eastern terminus	Local names	Formed	Removed	Notes
CR 25	6.0	9.7	River Road (CR 505) at the Hudson County line in Edgewater	East Palisade Avenue in Englewood Cliffs	River Road, Hudson Terrace	—	c. 1953	
CR S-25	1.41	2.27	River Road (CR 505) in Edgewater	Anderson Avenue (CR 29) in Cliffside Park	Gorge Road	—	—	
CR 26	0.49	0.79	River Road (CR 507) and Riverside Avenue (CR 507) in North Arlington	Ridge Road (Route 17) in North Arlington	Jauncey Avenue	—	—	
CR 27	1.96	3.15	Palisade Avenue (CR 719) at the Hudson County line in Cliffside Park	Route 5 in Fort Lee	Palisade Avenue	—	—	
CR 28	0.92	1.48	Park Avenue (CR 646) near the Avondale Bridge at the Essex County line in Lyndhurst	Ridge Road (Route 17) in Lyndhurst	Kingsland Avenue	—	—	
CR 29	4.01	6.45	Bergenline Avenue at the Hudson County line in Fairview	Fletcher Avenue (US 9W) in Fort Lee	Anderson Avenue, Main Street, Linwood Avenue	—	—	
CR S-29	0.86	1.38	Anderson Avenue (CR 29) in Fort Lee	I-95 in Fort Lee	Center Avenue	—	—	
CR 30	1.85	2.98	Riverside Avenue (CR 507) in Lyndhurst	East Erie Avenue (CR 32) in Rutherford	Park Avenue	—	—	
CR S-30	0.67	1.08	Riverside Avenue (CR 507) in Rutherford	Ridge Road (Route 17) and Rutherford Avenue (Route 17) in Rutherford	Rutherford Avenue	—	—	
CR 31	1.14	1.83	Broad Avenue (US 1/9) in Ridgefield	Maple Avenue (CR S31) in Ridgefield	Shaler Boulevard	—	—	
CR S-31	0.51	0.82	Shaler Boulevard (CR 31) in Ridgefield	Grand Avenue (Route 93) in Ridgefield	Maple Avenue	—	—	
CR 32	1.76	2.83	Jackson Avenue (CR 507) in Rutherford	Route 17 in Rutherford	West Erie Avenue, East Erie Avenue, Meadow Road	—	—	
CR S-32	1.41	2.27	Union Avenue Bridge at the Passaic County line in Rutherford	West Erie Avenue (CR 32) in Rutherford	Union Avenue	—	—	Maintained as CR S32-1
CR S-32	0.32	0.51	Park Avenue in East Rutherford	Route 17 in East Rutherford	Union Avenue	—	—	Maintained as CR S32-2
CR 33	0.40	0.64	Emerson Street in Ridgefield Park	Overpeck County Park entrance in Ridgefield Park	Challenger Road	—	—	Formerly assigned to a route from Palisades Park to the New York state line, replaced by CR 501
CR S-33	0.83	1.34	County Road (CR 501) in Demarest	Closter Dock Road (CR 502) in Alpine	Anderson Avenue	—	—	
CR 34	0.59	0.95	Locust Avenue (CR 507) in Wallington	Market Street (CR 619) at the Passaic County line in Wallington	Wallington Avenue	—	—	
CR 35	0.74	1.19	Piermont Road (CR 501) in Demarest	Closter Dock Road (CR 502) in Closter	County Road	—	—	
CR 36	1.87	3.01	Hackensack Street (CR 55) in Wood-Ridge	Washington Avenue (CR 503) and Moonachie Road (CR 503) on the Carlstadt/Moonachie border	Moonachie Avenue	—	—	
CR 37	0.53	0.85	Forest Avenue (CR 64) in Englewood	Englewood Avenue and Lafayette Avenue in Englewood	Lafayette Place	—	—	
CR S-37	0.31	0.50	Lafayette Place (CR 37) in Englewood	Palisade Avenue (CR 505) in Englewood	Lafayette Avenue	—	—	
CR 38	1.84	2.96	River Drive (CR 507) and Midland Avenue (CR 507/CR 67) in Garfield	Terrace Avenue (CR 55) in Hasbrouck Heights	River Drive, Saddle River Avenue, South Main Street, Passaic Avenue	—	—	
CR 39	13.14	21.15	Bergen Turnpike (CR 124) in Ridgefield Park	Main Street (CR 15) at the New York state line in Northvale	Teaneck Road, South Washington Avenue, North Washington Avenue, Washington Avenue, Schraalenburgh Road, Tappan Road	—	—	
CR 40	2.98	4.80	River Drive (CR 507) in Garfield	Route 17 in Hasbrouck Heights	Passaic Street, Passaic Avenue, Memorial Drive, Union Street, Williams Avenue	—	—	Maintained as CR 40-1
CR 40	0.95	1.53	US 46 in South Hackensack	Bergen Turnpike (CR 124) in Little Ferry	Main Street	—	—	Maintained as CR 40-2
CR S-40	1.10	1.77	US 46 in Teterboro	Division Place and Pink Street on the South Hackensack/Hackensack border	Huyler Street	—	—	
CR 41	6.80	10.94	Teaneck Road (CR 39) in Ridgefield Park	Milford Avenue (CR 126) in New Milford	Mount Vernon Street, Railroad Avenue, River Road	—	—	Maintained as CR 41-1
CR 41	1.36	2.19	Valley Road (CR 111) in Closter	Closter Dock Road (CR 502) in Closter	Durie Avenue, Demarest Avenue	—	—	Maintained as CR 41-2
CR S-41	1.36	2.19	Mount Vernon Street (CR 41) and Railroad Avenue (CR 41) in Ridgefield Park	Railroad Avenue (CR 41) in Ridgefield Park	Paulison Avenue, Hackensack Avenue	—	c. 1953	
CR 42	2.18	3.51	Ackerman Avenue at the Passaic County line in Garfield	Main Street (CR 61) in Lodi	Outwater Lane	—	—	
CR 43	3.7	6.0	Paterson Plank Road (Route 120) in East Rutherford	Hudson Street (CR 124) in Hackensack	Washington Avenue, Moonachie Road, Liberty Street	—	c. 1953	Consumed by CR 503
CR S-43	1.44	2.32	Moonachie Avenue (CR 36) in Moonachie	Liberty Street (CR 503) in Little Ferry	Redneck Avenue	—	—	
CR 44	2.18	3.51	Rochelle Avenue (CR 61) in Rochelle Park	State Street in Hackensack	Central Avenue	—	—	
CR 48	0.97	1.56	Broad Avenue (US 1/9) in Fairview	Woodcliff Avenue at the Hudson County line in Fairview	Fairview Avenue	—	—	
CR S-48	0.19	0.31	Bergenwood Avenue (CR 723) at the Hudson County line in Fairview	Fairview Avenue (CR 48) in Fairview	Bergenwood Road	—	—	
CR 49	7.54	12.13	Bergen Turnpike (CR 124) in Little Ferry	Knickerbocker Road (CR 505) in Englewood	South River Street, River Street, Hackensack Avenue, Main Street, New Bridge Road, South Washington Avenue, Liberty Road	—	—	
CR 49-S	0.30	0.48	River Road (CR 41) and New Bridge Road (CR 49) in Teaneck	New Bridge Road (CR 49) in Teaneck	Roemer Avenue	—	—	
CR S-49	0.13	0.21	Kinderkamack Road (CR 51) in River Edge	Hackensack Avenue (CR 503) in River Edge	Grand Avenue	—	—	
CR 50	1.65	2.66	Broad Avenue (US 1/9) in Ridgefield	Gorge Road (CR S25) in Cliffside Park	Edgewater Avenue, Edgewater Road	—	—	
CR 51	1.57	2.53	Anderson Street (CR 60) in Hackensack	Kinderkamack Road (CR 503) and Main Street (CR 503/CR 68) in River Edge	Main Street, Johnson Avenue, Kinderkamack Road	—	—	Formerly extended to the New York state line, replaced by CR 503
CR S-51	0.92	1.48	Broadway (CR 104) in Hillsdale	Demarest Avenue (CR S114) in Hillsdale	Washington Avenue	—	—	Formerly connected to CR 51 until it was truncated by CR 503
CR 53	5.85	9.41	Tappan Road (CR 39) and Schraalenburgh Road (CR 39/CR 109) in Harrington Park	South Middletown Road at the New York state line in Montvale	Harriot Avenue, Rivervale Road, South Middletown Road, North Middletown Road	—	—	
CR 54	0.36	0.58	Bergen Boulevard (Route 63) in Palisades Park	Glen Road (Route 5) in Fort Lee	Central Boulevard	—	—	
CR 55	5.52	8.88	East Erie Avenue (CR 32) in East Rutherford	Passaic Street (CR 62) in Hackensack	Terrace Avenue, Polifly Road, 1st Street	—	—	
CR S-55	0.86	1.38	Paterson Avenue (CR 120) in Carlstadt	Route 17 in Carlstadt	Hoboken Road	—	—	
CR 56	5.83	9.38	Passaic County line in Elmwood Park	River Road (CR 41) in Bogota	Market Street, Essex Street, Main Street, Court Street, West Fort Lee Road	—	—	Maintained as CR 56-1
CR 56	0.21	0.34	Midtown Bridge Approach (CR 56) in Hackensack	River Street (CR 503) in Hackensack	East Salem Street	—	—	Maintained as CR 56-2
CR 56	4.85	7.81	River Street (CR 503) in Hackensack	Hudson Terrace (CR 505) and Main Street (CR 505) in Fort Lee	Midtown Bridge Approach, East Salem Street, West Main Street, East Main Street, Degraw Avenue, Fort Lee Road, Main Street	—	—	Maintained as CR 56-3
CR S-56	0.13	0.21	Main Street (CR 56) in Fort Lee	Hudson Terrace (CR 505) in Fort Lee	Bigler Street	—	—	
CR 56	0.12	0.19	Teaneck Road (CR 39) in Teaneck	Dead end in Teaneck	Fort Lee Road	—	—	Maintained as CR 56-4
CR 57	4.28	6.89	Fritsch Avenue in Wood-Ridge	Passaic Street (CR 62) in Hackensack	4th Street, Valley Boulevard, Boulevard, South Summit Avenue, Summit Avenue	—	—	
CR 59	7.45	11.99	Essex Street (CR 56) on the Lodi/Maywood border	Washington Avenue (CR 502) in Westwood	Maywood Avenue, Forest Avenue, 4th Avenue, 3rd Avenue	—	—	Maintained as CR 59-1
CR S-59	0.51	0.82	Forest Avenue (CR 59) and 4th Avenue (CR 59) in Westwood	Ridgewood Road (CR 110) and Lafayette Avenue (CR 110) in Westwood	Forest Avenue Extension	—	—	Maintained as CR 59-2
CR 60	1.98	3.19	Passaic Street (CR 62) in Hackensack	Teaneck Road (CR 39) in Teaneck	Union Street, Anderson Street, East Anderson Street, Cedar Lane	—	—	
CR 61	7.61	12.25	Main Avenue (CR 507) and Midland Avenue (CR 507) in Wallington	Pascack Road (CR 63) and Ridgewood Avenue (CR S80) in Paramus	Main Avenue, Main Street, South Main Street, Hunter Street, Memorial Drive, Main Street, Rochelle Avenue, Farview Avenue	—	—	
CR S-61	0.17	0.27	Saddle River Road (CR 79) in Saddle Brook	Rochelle Avenue (CR 61) in Rochelle Park	Railroad Avenue	—	—	
CR 62	7.72	12.42	Main Street in Hackensack	Route 17 in Ridgewood	Passaic Street, Paramus Road	—	—	Maintained as CR 62-1
CR 62	1.27	2.04	East Glen Avenue (CR 82) in Ridgewood	North Maple Avenue (CR 507), Franklin Turnpike (CR 507) and Sheridan Avenue (CR 77) in Ho-Ho-Kus	Franklin Turnpike	—	—	Maintained as CR 62-2
CR 63	6.47	10.41	Farview Avenue (CR 61) and Ridgewood Avenue (CR S80) in Paramus	West Grand Avenue (CR 94) on the Montvale/Park Ridge border	Pascack Road	—	—	
CR S-63	6.47	10.41	Pascack Road (CR 63) in Washington Township	Lafayette Avenue (CR 110) in Westwood	Washington Avenue	—	c. 1953	Consumed by CR 502
CR 64	1.45	2.33	Teaneck Road (CR 39) in Teaneck	Grand Avenue (CR 501) in Englewood	East Forest Avenue	—	—	
CR 65	0.75	1.21	US 46 in Lodi	Market Street (CR 56) in Saddle Brook	Westminster Place, Westminster Avenue	—	—	
CR 66	6.47	10.41	Dyckman Street Ferry in Englewood Cliffs	Engle Street (CR 501) in Englewood	East Palisade Avenue	—	c. 1953	Consumed by CR 505
CR 67	4.23	6.81	Midland Avenue (CR 507) and River Drive (CR 507/CR 38) in Garfield	Broadway (Route 4) in Fair Lawn	Midland Avenue	—	—	
CR 68	0.17	0.27	Route 4 in River Edge	Kinderkamack Road (CR 503) and Main Street (CR 503/CR 51) in River Edge	Main Street	—	—	
CR S-68	1.56	2.51	Liberty Road (CR 49) in Teaneck	Engle Street (CR 501) in Englewood	Ivy Lane	—	—	
CR 69	3.11	5.01	Maple Avenue (CR 507) and River Road (CR 507) in Fair Lawn	Godwin Avenue (CR 80) in Ridgewood	Wagaraw Road, Lincoln Avenue, Lake Avenue	—	—	Lincoln Avenue runs concurrently with CR 653 on the Passaic County line
CR S-69	0.29	0.47	Market Street (CR 56) in Elmwood Park	River Drive (CR 507) in Elmwood Park	River Road	—	—	Maintained as CR S69-1
CR S-69	0.35	0.56	Carlton Avenue (CR 507) and Locust Lane (CR 507) in East Rutherford	Paterson Avenue (CR 120) in East Rutherford	Carlton Avenue	—	—	Maintained as CR S69-2
CR 70	3.97	6.39	Kinderkamack Road (CR 503) in River Edge	West Railroad Avenue in Tenafly	River Edge Road, River Edge Avenue, River Road, River Edge Road, North Prospect Avenue, West Main Street, East Main Street, Riveredge Road	—	—	
CR S-70	0.99	1.59	New Bridge Road (CR 49) in Bergenfield	North Prospect Avenue (CR 70) and West Main Street (CR 70) in Bergenfield	South Prospect Avenue	—	—	
CR 71	4.13	6.65	Route 17 in Ridgewood	Glen Road (CR 92) in Woodcliff Lake	Van Emburgh Avenue, Wierimus Road	—	—	
CR 72	2.05	3.30	East Clinton Avenue (CR 501) and Dean Drive (CR 501) in Tenafly	Sylvan Avenue (US 9W) in Tenafly	East Clinton Avenue	—	—	
CR 73	5.36	8.63	East Saddle River Road (CR 75) in Ho-Ho-Kus	Chestnut Ridge Road (NY 45) at the New York state line in Montvale	Jacquelin Avenue, Chestnut Ridge Road, County Road, Chestnut Ridge Road	—	—	
CR S-73	0.90	1.45	Woodcliff Lake Road (CR 90) and Saddle River Road (CR 90) in Woodcliff Lake	County Road (CR 73) and Chestnut Ridge Road (CR 73) in Woodcliff Lake	Chestnut Ridge Road	—	—	
CR 74	1.53	2.46	Farview Avenue (CR 61) in Paramus	Kinderkamack Road (CR 503) in River Edge	Midland Avenue	—	—	Maintained as CR 74-1
CR 74	5.82	9.37	New Milford Avenue in Oradell	Sylvan Avenue (US 9W) in Alpine	Madison Avenue, Union Avenue, Piermont Road, Hillside Avenue	—	—	Maintained as CR 74-2
CR 75	7.09	11.41	Route 17 in Ridgewood	Saddle River Road (CR 73) at the New York state line in Upper Saddle River	East Saddle River Road, East Allendale Road, East Saddle River Road	—	—	
CR 76	2.73	4.39	Passaic County line in Fair Lawn	Paramus Road (CR 62) in Paramus	Fair Lawn Avenue, Century Road	—	—	
CR S-76	0.49	0.79	Dead end in Paramus	Paramus Road (CR 62) in Paramus	Dunkerhook Road	—	—	
CR 77	6.18	9.95	North Maple Avenue (CR 507) and Franklin Turnpike (CR 507/CR62) in Ho-Ho-Kus	Shuart Road at the New York state line in Upper Saddle River	Sheridan Avenue, West Saddle River Road	—	—	
CR 78	2.39	3.85	East 33rd Street (CR 651) at the Passaic County line in Fair Lawn	Saddle River Road (CR 79) in Fair Lawn	Morlot Avenue	—	—	
CR 79	6.69	10.77	Market Street (CR 56) in Saddle Brook	Godwin Avenue (CR 80) in Ridgewood	Saddle River Road, Prospect Street, Ackerman Avenue	—	—	
CR S-79	1.11	1.79	Ackerman Avenue (CR 79) and Prospect Street (CR 79) in Glen Rock	South Maple Avenue (CR 507) in Ridgewood	Prospect Street	—	—	
CR 80	6.48	10.43	Godwin Avenue (CR 84) and Goffle Road (CR 84) in Midland Park	Kinderkamack Road (CR 503) in Oradell	Godwin Avenue, Wilsey Square, Garber Square, Franklin Avenue, North Maple Avenue, East Ridgewood Avenue, Ridgewood Avenue, Oradell Avenue	—	—	Maintained as CR 80-1
CR 80	4.35	7.00	Haworth/Oradell border	Anderson Avenue (CR S33) in Demarest	Sunset Avenue, Haworth Drive, Haworth Avenue, Schraalenburgh Road, Hardenburgh Avenue	—	—	Maintained as CR 80-2
CR S-80	1.45	2.33	Farview Avenue (CR 61) and Pascack Road (CR 63) in Paramus	Kinderkamack Road (CR 503) in Oradell	East Ridgewood Avenue	—	—	
CR 81	7.61	12.25	Godwin Avenue (CR 84) in Midland Park	Church Road at the New York state line in Mahwah	Prospect Street, Crescent Avenue, West Crescent Avenue, East Crescent Avenue	—	—	
CR S-81	0.42	0.68	Franklin Turnpike (CR 507) and East Main Street (CR 87) in Ramsey	East Crescent Avenue (CR 81) in Ramsey	Lake Street	—	—	
CR 82	2.75	4.43	Prospect Street (CR 81) in Midland Park	Paramus Road (CR 62) in Ridgewood	Glen Avenue, West Glen Avenue, East Glen Avenue	—	—	Maintained as CR 82-1
CR 82	1.25	2.01	East Saddle River Road (CR 75) in Ridgewood	Pascack Road (CR 63/CR 110) and Ridgewood Road (CR 110) in Washington Township	East Glen Avenue, Ridgewood Road	—	—	Maintained as CR 82-2
CR 83	2.65	4.26	Franklin Turnpike (CR 507) in Ramsey	South Airmont Road (CR 89) at the New York state line in Mahwah	Airmount Avenue	—	—	
CR 84	7.86	12.65	US 202 in Oakland	Goffle Road (CR 659) at the Passaic County line in Wyckoff	Franklin Avenue, Godwin Avenue, Goffle Road	—	—	
CR S-84	5.53	8.90	Franklin Avenue (CR 84) in Wyckoff	Franklin Turnpike (CR 507) in Waldwick	Wyckoff Avenue, Franklin Avenue	—	c. 1953	Consumed by CR 502
CR 85	5.53	8.90	West Crescent Avenue (CR 81) in Allendale	US 202 in Mahwah	Hillside Avenue, South Central Avenue, North Central Avenue, Island Road	—	—	
CR 86	2.55	4.10	Pulis Avenue (CR S89) and Campgaw Road (CR S89) in Franklin Lakes	Hillside Avenue (CR 85) in Allendale	Pulis Avenue, Forest Road	—	—	
CR 87	7.85	12.63	Godwin Avenue (CR 80) in Ridgewood	Franklin Turnpike (CR 507) and Lake Street (CR S81) in Ramsey	Lake Avenue, Wyckoff Avenue, West Main Street, East Main Street	—	—	
CR S-87	0.57	0.92	Godwin Avenue (CR 84) and Franklin Avenue (CR 502/CR 84) in Wyckoff	Wyckoff Avenue (CR 87) in Wyckoff	Godwin Avenue	—	—	
CR 89	3.10	4.99	High Mountain Road (CR 677) at the Passaic County line in Franklin Lakes	Colonial Road (CR 117) in Franklin Lakes	High Mountain Road	—	—	Maintained as CR 89-1
CR 89	0.14	0.23	Franklin Avenue (CR 84) in Oakland	Dead end in Oakland	High Mountain Road	—	—	Maintained as CR 89-2
CR S-89	6.07	9.77	High Mountain Road (CR 89) in Franklin Lakes	Darlington Avenue (CR 98) in Mahwah	Summit Avenue, Franklin Avenue, Pulis Avenue, Campagaw Road	—	—	
CR 90	6.89	11.09	Franklin Turnpike (CR 507) in Allendale	Rivervale Road (CR 53) in River Vale	East Allendale Avenue, East Allendale Road, Woodcliff Lake Road, Saddle River Road, Werimus Road, Woodcliff Avenue, Broadway, Prospect Avenue	—	—	
CR 91	9.77	15.72	US 202 at the Passaic County line in Oakland	US 202 at the New York state line in Mahwah	Ramapo Valley Road	—	—	
CR S-91	3.14	5.05	US 202 in Oakland	Skyline Drive (CR 692) at the Passaic County line in Oakland	West Oakland Avenue, Skyline Drive	—	—	
CR 92	2.35	3.78	Piermont Avenue (CR 114) in Hillsdale	Pascack Road (CR 63) in Park Ridge	Ruckman Road, Park Avenue	—	—	Maintained as CR 92-1
CR 92	1.45	2.33	Chestnut Ridge Road (CR S73) in Woodcliff Lake	Ridge Avenue in Park Ridge	Glen Road, Spring Valley Road, Fremont Avenue, Pascack Road	—	—	Maintained as CR 92-2
CR 92	0.49	0.79	East Allendale Road (CR 90) and Woodcliff Lake Road (CR 90) in Saddle River	Chestnut Ridge Road (CR 73) in Saddle River	East Allendale Road	—	—	Maintained as CR 92-3
CR 93	5.60	9.01	US 202 in Oakland	Sicomac Avenue (CR 667) at the Passaic County line in Wyckoff	Long Hill Road, Franklin Lake Road, Sicomac Avenue	—	—	Maintained as CR 93-1
CR 93	1.55	2.49	Sicomac Avenue (CR 93) in Wyckoff	Godwin Avenue (CR 84) in Midland Park	Cedar Hill Avenue, Newtown Road, Greenwood Avenue, Central Avenue	—	—	Maintained as CR 93-2
CR S-93	1.07	1.72	Sicomac Avenue (CR 93) in Wyckoff	Wyckoff Avenue (CR 87) in Wyckoff	Russell Avenue	—	—	
CR 94	4.12	6.63	Chestnut Ridge Road (CR 73) in Montvale	Blue Hill Road South (CR 23) at the New York state line in River Vale	West Grand Avenue, East Grand Avenue, South Middletown Road, Blue Hill Road, Orangeburgh Road	—	—	
CR S-94	1.63	2.62	Spring Valley Road (CR 92) and Fremont Avenue (CR 92) in Park Ridge	Schoolhouse Road (CR 41) at the New York state line in Montvale	Spring Valley Road	—	—	
CR 96	4.06	6.53	East Crescent Avenue (CR 81) in Upper Saddle River	Spring Valley Road (CR S94) in Montvale	Lake Street, West Grand Avenue, Summit Avenue	—	—	
CR 97	0.99	1.59	High Mountain Road (CR 89) in Franklin Lakes	Ewing Avenue (CR 502) and Franklin Lake Road (CR 502/CR 93) in Franklin Lakes	Ewing Avenue	—	—	
CR 98	2.83	4.55	US 202 in Mahwah	North Central Avenue (CR 85) in Ramsey	Darlington Avenue	—	—	
CR 99	0.74	1.19	Rivervale Road (CR 53) in River Vale	Blue Hill Road (CR 94) and Orangeburgh Road (CR 94) in River Vale	Orangeburgh Road	—	—	
CR 100	1.17	1.88	US 202 in Mahwah	Franklin Turnpike (CR 507) in Mahwah	West Ramapo Avenue, Island Road, East Ramapo Avenue, Ramapo Avenue	—	—	
CR 101	2.39	3.85	Wyckoff Avenue (CR 87) in Wyckoff	Franklin Turnpike (CR 507) in Allendale	Crescent Avenue, Brookside Avenue, Park Avenue, West Orchard Street	—	—	
CR 102	1.02	1.64	Schraalenburgh Road (CR 39) in Harrington Park	Closter Dock Road (CR 102) in Closter	Closter Road, Livingston Street, Harrington Avenue	—	—	Maintained as CR 102-1
CR 102	0.85	1.37	Harrington Avenue (CR 102) in Closter	Closter Dock Road (CR 502) and High Street (CR 502/CR 104) in Closter	Closter Dock Road	—	—	Maintained as CR 102-2
CR 104	3.02	4.86	Washington Avenue (CR 502/CR S114), Broadway (CR 502), and Westwood Avenue (CR S114) in Westwood	Park Avenue (CR 92) in Park Ridge	Broadway	—	—	Maintained as CR 104-1
CR 104	0.36	0.58	Piermont Road (CR 501) in Closter	High Street (CR 502) and Closter Dock Road (CR 502/CR 102) in Closter	High Street	—	—	Maintained as CR 104-2
CR S-104	0.42	0.68	Old Hook Road (CR 502) in Harrington Park	Harriot Avenue (CR 53) in Harrington Park	Bogerts Mill Road	—	—	
CR 105	0.82	1.32	Market Street (CR 56) in Elmwood Park	Dead end in Elmwood Park	Van Riper Avenue	—	—	Maintained as CR 105-1
CR 105	0.80	1.29	Midland Avenue (CR 67) in Saddle Brook	Saddle River Road (CR 79) in Saddle Brook	New Pehile Avenue, Pehle Avenue	—	—	Maintained as CR 105-2
CR 106	3.16	5.09	Old Tappan Road (CR 110) in Old Tappan	Piermont Road (CR 501) in Norwood	Central Avenue, Broadway	—	—	
CR 108	1.34	2.16	Tappan Road (CR 39) in Northvale	Piermont Road (CR 501) in Rockleigh	Paris Avenue	—	—	
CR 109	1.73	2.78	Schraalenburgh Road (CR 39), Tappan Road (CR 39), and Harriot Avenue (CR 53) in Harrington Park	Westwood Avenue (CR 110) and Washington Avenue South (CR 110) in Old Tappan	Schraalenburgh Road, Lafayette Road, Blanch Avenue, Cripplebush Road	—	—	
CR S-109	1.39	2.24	Livingston Street (CR 505) in Norwood	Blanch Avenue (CR 109) and Lafayette Road (CR 109) in Harrington Park	Blanch Avenue	—	—	
CR 110	4.68	7.53	North Maple Avenue (CR 507) in Ridgewood	Washington Avenue (CR 502) in Westwood	Linwood Avenue, Pascack Road, Ridgewood Road, Lafayette Avenue	—	—	Maintained as CR 110-1
CR 110	5.40	8.69	Kinderkamack Road (CR 503) and Westwood Avenue (CR 110/CR S114) in Westwood	Old Tappan Road (CR 8) at the New York state line in Old Tappan	Harrington Avenue, Park Place, Westwood Avenue, Washington Avenue South, Old Tappan Road	—	—	Maintained as CR 110-2
CR S-110	0.65	1.05	Ridgewood Avenue (CR 80) in Paramus	Linwood Avenue (CR 110) in Paramus	Highland Avenue	—	—	
CR 111	0.55	0.89	Haworth Avenue (CR 80) in Haworth	Durie Avenue (CR 41) in Haworth	Valley Road	—	—	
CR 112	4.09	6.58	Route 17 on the Ho-Ho-Kus/Ridgewood border	Kinderkamack Road (CR 503) in Hillsdale	Racetrack Road, West Saddle River Road, Bogert Road, East Saddle River Road, Wearimus Road, Wierimus Road, Hillsdale Avenue	—	—	Maintained as CR 112-1
CR 112	0.46	0.74	Franklin Turnpike (CR 62) on the Ho-Ho-Kus/Ridgewood border	Route 17 on the Ho-Ho-Kus/Ridgewood border	Racetrack Road	—	—	Maintained as CR 112-2
CR 113	0.8	1.3	Berdan Avenue at the Passaic County line on the Oakland/Franklin Lakes border	Long Hill Road (CR 93) in Oakland	Breakneck Road	—	c. 1952	Consumed by CR 502
CR 114	1.62	2.61	Broadway (CR 104) in Hillsdale	Rivervale Road (CR 53) in River Vale	Piermont Avenue	—	—	
CR S-114	1.53	2.46	Washington Avenue (CR 502/CR 104), Broadway (CR 502) and Westwood Avenue (CR 104/CR 110) in Westwood	Piermont Avenue (CR 114) on the Hillsdale/River Vale border	Westwood Avenue, Demarest Avenue, Cedar Lane	—	—	
CR 115	1.01	1.63	Forest Avenue (CR 59) at the Paramus/Emerson/Oradell tripoint border	Kinderkamack Road (CR 503) in Oradell	Soldier Hill Road	—	—	
CR 116	1.04	1.67	Rivervale Road (CR 53) in River Vale	Old Tappan Road (CR 110) and Washington Avenue South (CR 110) in Old Tappan	Old Tappan Road	—	—	
CR 117	2.53	4.07	Franklin Lake Road (CR 502/CR 93) in Franklin Lakes	Franklin Avenue (CR 84) in Franklin Lakes	Colonial Road	—	—	
CR 118	—	—	Franklin Turnpike (CR 507) in Ho-Ho-Kus	East Saddle River Road (CR 75) in Ho-Ho-Kus	Hollywood Avenue	—	c. 1953	Consumed by CR 502
CR 119	0.31	0.50	Anderson Avenue (CR 29) in Fort Lee	Palisade Avenue (CR 27) in Fort Lee	Columbia Avenue	—	—	
CR 120	2.41	3.88	Gregory Avenue at the Passaic County line in Wallington	Route 17 and Route 120 in East Rutherford	Main Avenue, Paterson Avenue	—	—	
CR 123	0.77	1.24	Spring Valley Road (CR 92/CR S94) in Park Ridge	Pascack Road (CR 63/CR 92) in Park Ridge	Fremont Avenue	—	—	
CR 124	1.59	2.56	Main Street (CR S124) in Ridgefield Park	Broad Avenue (US 1/9) in Ridgefield	Bergen Turnpike, Hendricks Causeway	—	—	Maintained as CR 124-1
CR 124	2.11	3.40	Main Street (CR 40) in Little Ferry	Essex Street (CR 56) and Main Street (CR 56) in Hackensack	Bergen Turnpike, Hudson Street	—	—	Maintained as CR 124-2
CR S-124	0.22	0.35	Bergen Turnpike (CR 124) in Ridgefield Park	Winant Avenue (US 46) in Ridgefield Park	Main Street, Ridgefield Avenue	—	—	
CR 126	1.65	2.66	Madison Avenue (CR 74) in New Milford	Washington Avenue (CR 39) in Dumont	Milford Avenue, New Milford Avenue	—	—	
CR 127	1.36	2.19	Route 208 on the Glen Rock/Fair Lawn border	Ackerman Avenue (CR 79) in Glen Rock	Harristown Road	—	—	Maintained as CR 127-1
CR 127	0.46	0.74	Lincoln Avenue (CR 69) on the Fair Lawn/Hawthorne border	Elm Avenue on the Fair Lawn/Glen Rock border	Harristown Road	—	—	Maintained as CR 127-2
CR 130	2.84	4.57	Belleville Turnpike (Route 7) and Schuyler Avenue (CR 507) on the Kearny/North Arlington border	Rutherford Avenue (Route 17) in Lyndhurst	Schuyler Avenue, Page Avenue, Orient Way	—	—	
CR 131	0.52	0.84	Westwood Avenue (CR 110) in River Vale	Demarest Avenue (CR S114) and Cedar Lane (CR S114) in River Vale	Cedar Lane	—	—	
CR 134	1.59	2.56	Lincoln Avenue (CR 69) on the Glen Rock/Hawthorne border	Prospect Street (CR S79) in Glen Rock	Rock Road	—	—	
CR C-4	0.11	0.18	Hudson Street (CR 124) in Hackensack	South River Street (CR 503/CR 49) in Hackensack	East Kansas Street	—	—	
CR C-21	0.12	0.19	Kinderkamack Road (CR 51) in Hackensack	Dead end in Hackensack	Zabriskiz Street	—	—	
CR C-22	0.10	0.16	Main Street in Hackensack	Johnson Avenue in Hackensack	Jefferson Street	—	—	

== History ==
Bergen County has one of the longest-lasting county route systems in New Jersey, being one of only two counties in the state not to switch to a 600-series system with the introduction of the 500-series routes. Bergen County's system dates to the 1920s, and the current system has few changes from its first implementation.

There were two implementations of longer-distance routes. In the late 1930s, a group of three roads in Bergen County received the numbers 200, 201, and 203. 200 ran from Oakland to Alpine; 201 ran from Ridgewood to Alpine; and 203 ran from Weehawken to Alpine. This was the precursor to the 500 series, though with the advent of that system, the 200-series were eliminated by the 1960s. In the late 1950s and early 1960s, the county experimented with long-distance routes to cover the whole county. These were numbered from 1 to 17; north–south routes were given odd numbers, and increased numerically from west to east, and east–west routes were given even numbers, and increased numerically north to south. The routes were signed, but have fallen out of fashion to the extent that the NJDOT no longer recognizes them in their route logs.
