= East Saddle River Road =

East Saddle River Road is a north–south road from Ridgewood, New Jersey to Monsey, New York.

It is part of the following routes:

- County Route 75 (Bergen County, New Jersey)
- County Route 73 (Rockland County, New York)
