= New Jersey Route 208 =

State highway in Bergen and Passaic counties in New Jersey, United States

Route 208
- World War II Veterans Memorial Highway

Route information
- Maintained by NJDOT
- Length: 10.07 mi (16.21 km)
- Existed: January 1, 1953–present

Major junctions
- South end: Route 4 / CR 79 in Fair Lawn
- CR 507 in Fair Lawn; CR 502 in Franklin Lakes
- North end: I-287 in Oakland

Location
- Country: United States
- State: New Jersey
- Counties: Bergen, Passaic

Highway system
- New Jersey State Highway Routes; Interstate; US; State; Scenic Byways
← US 206	→ I-278

Route 208 is a state highway in the northern part of New Jersey in the United States. It runs 10.07 miles (16.21 km) from an interchange with Route 4 and County Route 79 (CR 79, Saddle River Road) in Fair Lawn northwest to an interchange with Interstate 287 (I-287) in Oakland borough line. The route runs through suburban areas of Bergen and Passaic counties as a four- to six-lane divided highway. The route runs through the communities of Fair Lawn, Glen Rock, Hawthorne, Wyckoff, and Franklin Lakes along the way, interchanging with CR 507 in Fair Lawn and CR 502 in Franklin Lakes.

What is now Route 208 was initially planned as Route S4B in 1929, a spur of Route 4 that was to run from Fair Lawn northwest to the New York border in Greenwood Lake, where it would eventually connect to New York State Route 208 (NY 208). This route replaced what was planned as a part of Route 3 in 1927 between Paterson and Greenwood Lake. By the time the route was renumbered to Route 208 in 1953 to match NY 208, only a portion of the route in Fair Lawn from Route 4 to Maple Avenue had been built. Route 208 was completed west to U.S. Route 202 (US 202) in Oakland by 1960 as a two-lane undivided road; it would be built into its present configuration in later years. A Route 208 freeway was planned across the Ramapo Mountains from Oakland to connect to a proposed NY 208 freeway at Greenwood Lake; however, it was never built. After I-287 was extended from Montville to the New York border in 1993, it took over the alignment of Route 208 between US 202 and the route’s current northern terminus. The last traffic signal along Route 208 at McBride Avenue was removed in 1995 and the interchange with Route 4 and Saddle River Road was reconstructed in 2002.

== Route description ==
Traffic moves in at least two lanes in each direction for the road's entire length of 10.07 miles (16.21 km), widening briefly to three lanes next to a commercial area in Fair Lawn and near its northern terminus.

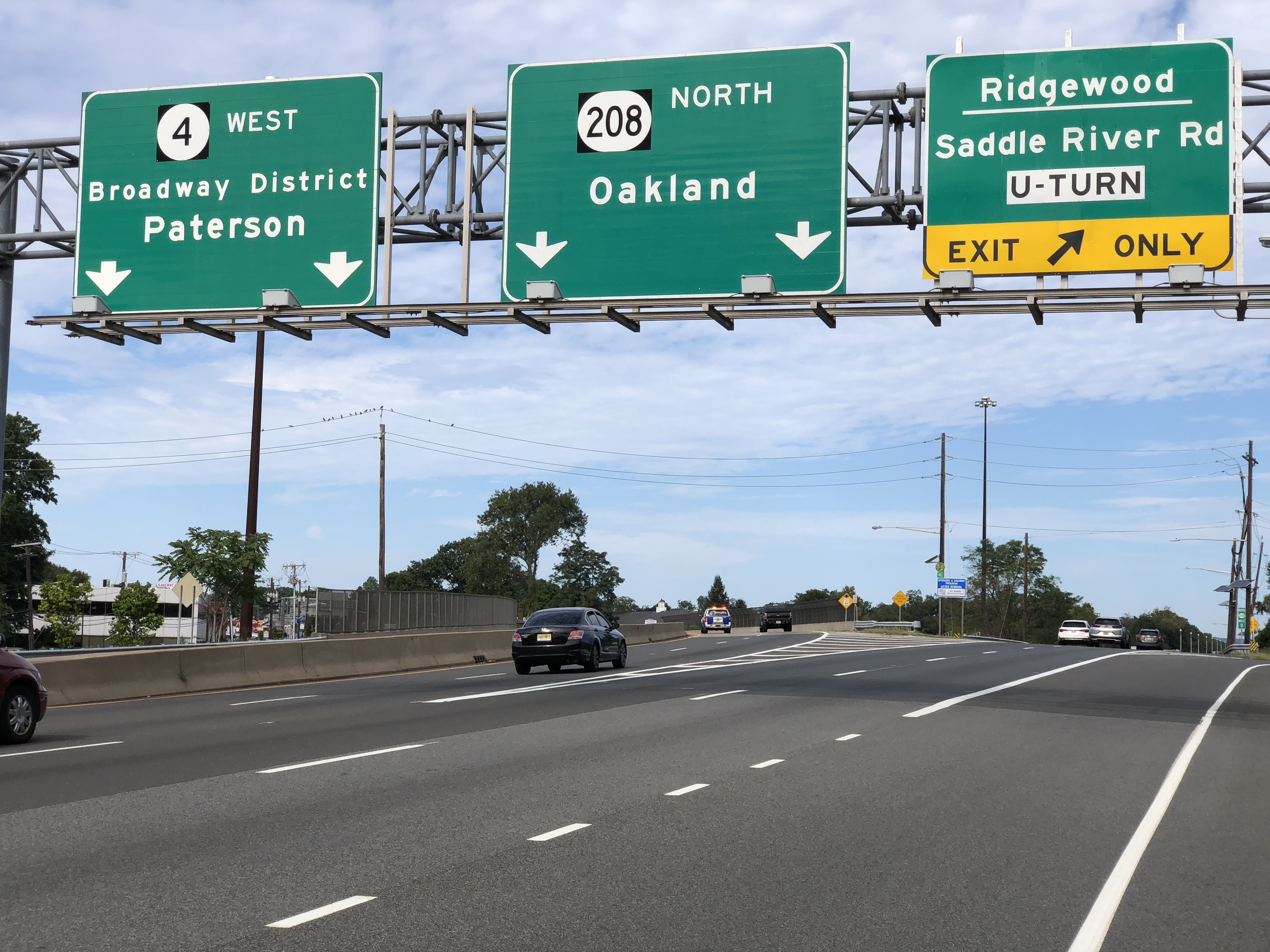
The beginning of northbound Route 208 at Route 4 westbound in Fair Lawn

The road originates as a four-lane arterial road at an interchange with Route 4 in Fair Lawn, Bergen County that also includes ramps for CR 79 (Saddle River Road), heading to the west near residential areas. Shortly after beginning, a ramp from southbound Route 208 provides access via Virginia Drive to westbound Route 4. The next exit is a partial interchange with CR 78 (Morlot Avenue), followed by a full interchange with Plaza Road. Past the latter, the route passes over NJ Transit's Bergen County Line and comes to a southbound exit and entrance with Berdan Avenue. From here, the road turns to the northwest, passing near more neighborhoods before coming to an interchange with CR 76 (Fair Lawn Avenue). Past this interchange, the northbound direction of Route 208 widens to three lanes and it continues into commercial areas, with some driveways along the road and an intersection with McBride Avenue. At this point, the highway passes an industrial park. A short distance later, the road reaches the interchange with CR 507 (Maple Avenue) and CR 127 (Harristown Road). Past this interchange, the road enters Glen Rock and has a northbound exit and entrance with De Boer Drive before crossing over NJ Transit's Main Line. Route 208 then heads through wooded residential areas prior to a northbound interchange with CR 653 (Lincoln Avenue), where it enters Hawthorne, Passaic County. CR 653 and Route 208 are connected by a short segment of CR 664 (Rea Avenue).

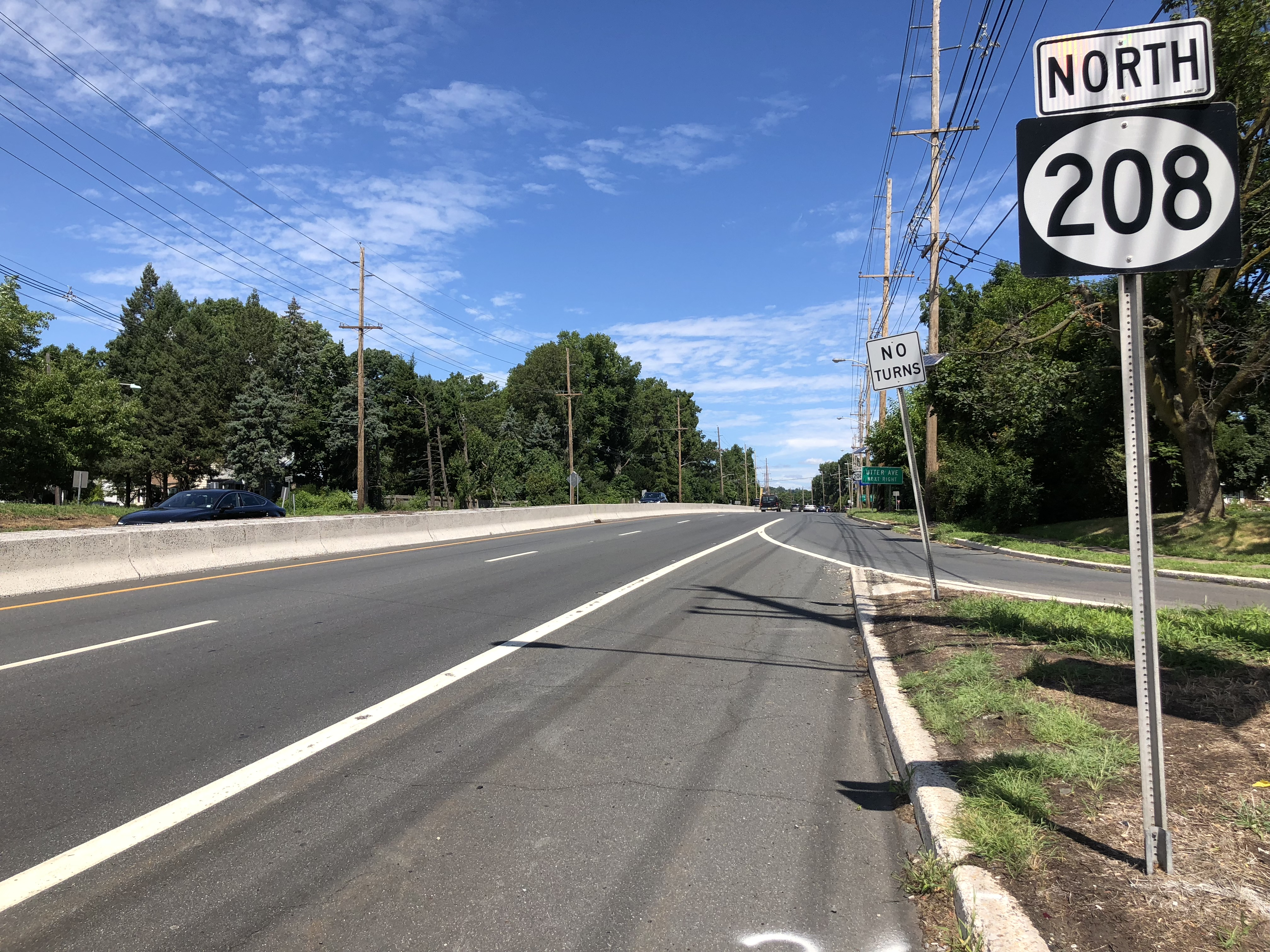
Route 208 northbound past the Lincoln Avenue interchange in Hawthorne

The highway has turnoffs in each direction for Utter Avenue before passing beneath the New York, Susquehanna and Western Railway's (NYSW) New Jersey Subdivision line prior the interchange with CR 659 (Goffle Road). Past here, the highway turns north and climbs a hill, passing the Hawthorne Gospel Church on the right. It re-enters Bergen County in Wyckoff, just before the Grandview Avenue interchange. From here, Route 208 largely resembles a wooded parkway, although there are a few driveways off the road. The road turns northwest and interchanges with CR 93 (Cedar Hill Avenue) before passing near more homes and coming to an interchange with CR S93 (Russell Avenue). The road continues into Franklin Lakes and interchanges with CR 502 (Ewing Avenue) before turning west-northwest and coming to an exit for CR S89 (Summit Avenue). Past Summit Avenue, the road has two interchanges providing access to the Becton Dickinson headquarters campus, where the road carries three lanes in each direction. It narrows back to two lanes in each direction before coming to the interchange with CR 117 (Colonial Road) and CR 89 (High Mountain Road). The final exit heading northbound is for I-287 north, an interchange that includes another crossing of the NYSW line. After passing the exit, Route 208 northbound merges into I-287 southbound in Oakland.

== History ==
Route S4B
- Location: West Milford–Fair Lawn
- Existed: 1929–1953

Route 208 was first plotted in 1929 as Route S4B, a spur of Route 4 that was to run from Fair Lawn northwest through Ringwood, and West Milford to the New York border near Greenwood Lake. This route was to replace what was to be a portion of Route 3 between Paterson and the New York border that was designated in the 1927 New Jersey state highway renumbering. The road was projected to continue into New York and continue through Sterling Forest and Monroe, New York, where it would join NY 208 at its intersection with NY 17. By 1953, the portion of Route S4B between Route 4 and Maple Avenue in Fair Lawn was completed; that same year, it was renumbered to Route 208 in order to match NY 208. By 1960, the road was extended to a northern terminus at US 202 and West Oakland Avenue in Oakland, where traffic could exit and continue over Skyline Drive to Ringwood. When first constructed, this portion of Route 208 was a two-lane undivided road. By 1969, the portion between Maple Avenue and Goffle Road was widened to a divided highway with the entire route built into a multi-lane divided highway by the 1980s.

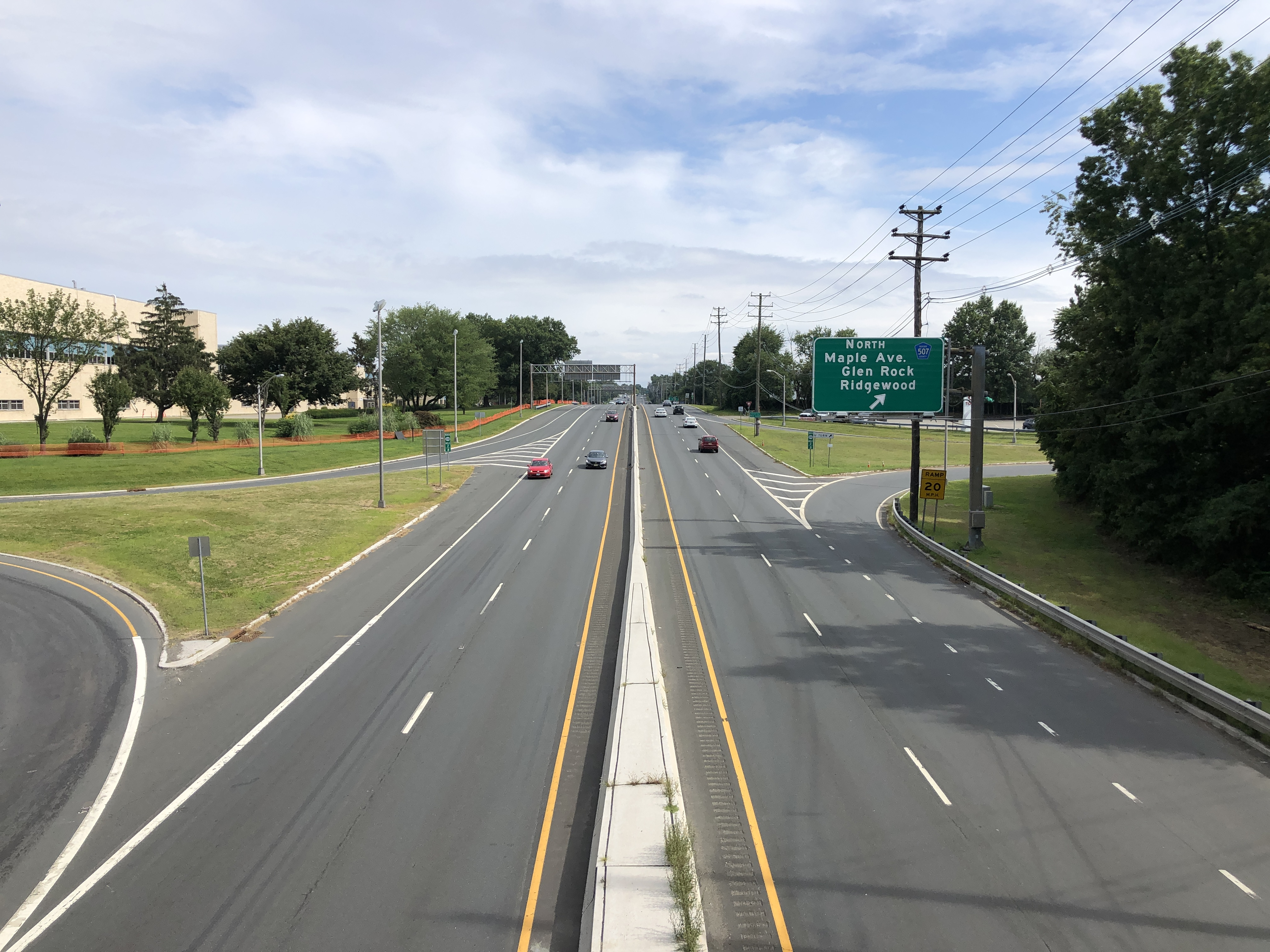
Route 208 at the CR 507 interchange in Fair Lawn, facing south

Meanwhile, plans still existed to build Route 208 past Oakland to the New York border. Passaic County called for a divided highway to bypass Skyline Drive, and in 1967 the New Jersey Department of Transportation (NJDOT) proposed a Route 208 freeway through the Ramapo Mountains that would run from Oakland to the New York border in Greenwood Lake, where it would connect to a proposed NY 208 freeway (called the Orange Expressway) that would continue north to I-84 in Maybrook, New York. This freeway, which was to cost $66.3 million, was to improve traffic in the resort areas of the Ramapo Mountains and also connect to the proposed Route 94 freeway leading to Warren County and the proposed Route 178 freeway leading to Morris County. In 1975, this proposed freeway was recommended by the Tri-State Regional Planning Commission to be completed by 2000. However, it was never built.

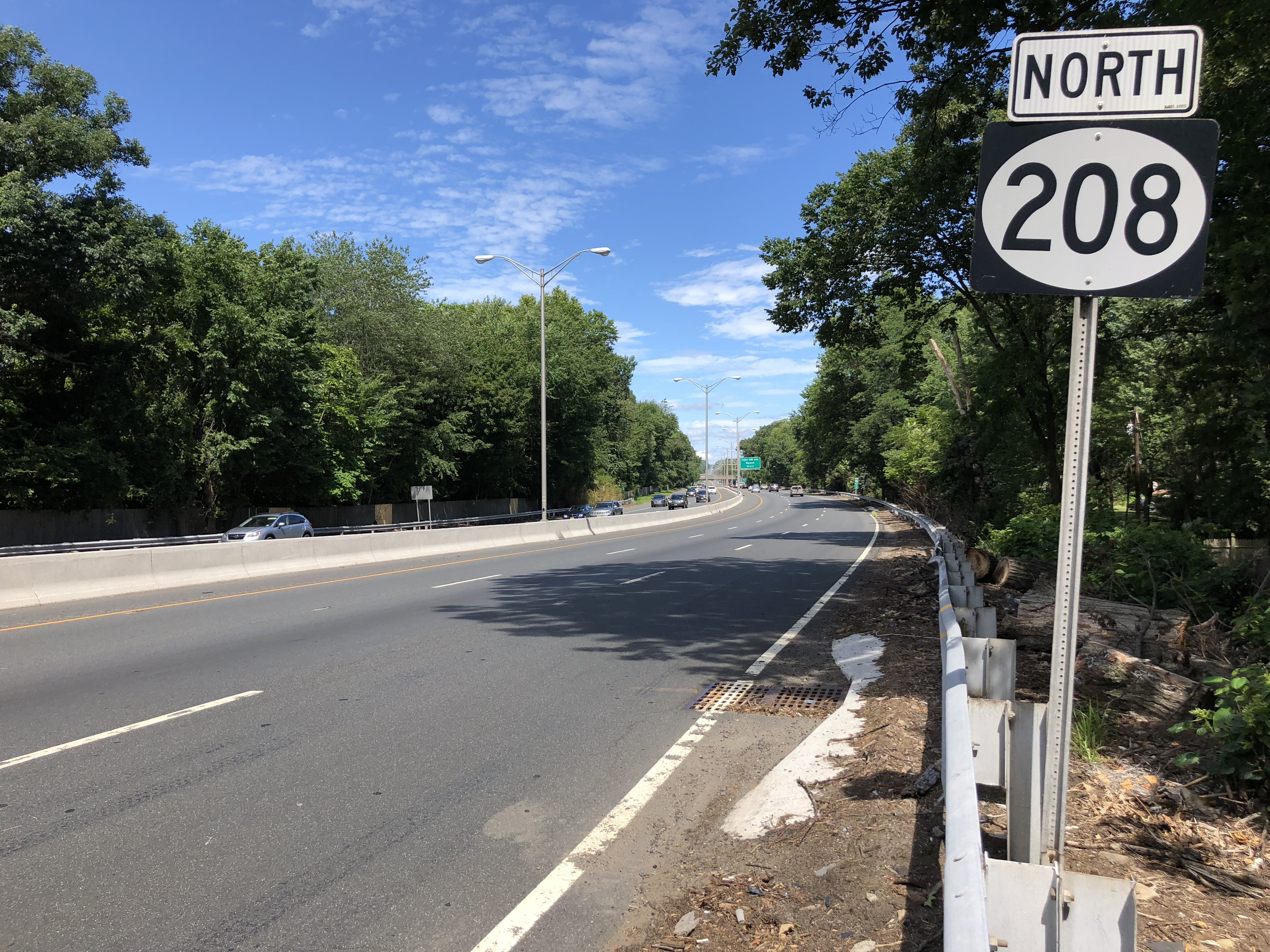
View north along Route 208 just north of Grandview Avenue in Wyckoff

When I-287 was extended from Montville to the New York border in 1993, it took over the alignment of Route 208 between US 202 and the current northern terminus of Route 208. In 1995, the last traffic signal along Route 208 at McBride Avenue was turned off. In 2002, construction was completed on a $32 million project that improved the interchange with Route 4 in Fair Lawn. This interchange saw improvements of the ramps and bridges, including the Route 208 bridge over Saddle River Road. Route 208, like many other highways in New Jersey, once had solar powered emergency call boxes every 1.0 mile (1.6 km); however with the advent of cell phones the usage of these call boxes became extremely limited. To save on maintenance costs, the NJDOT removed these call boxes in 2005.

== Exit list ==
All exits are unnumbered.

County	Location	mi	km	Destinations	Notes
Bergen	Fair Lawn	0.00	0.00	Route 4 east – Fort Lee, New York City	Southern terminus
Bergen	Fair Lawn	0.07	0.11	Saddle River Road (CR 79 north) – Ridgewood	Northbound exit and southbound entrance
Bergen	Fair Lawn	0.25	0.40	Virginia Drive	Southbound exit and entrance
Bergen	Fair Lawn	0.94	1.51	Morlot Avenue (CR 78) – Fair Lawn	Northbound exit only
Bergen	Fair Lawn	1.22	1.96	Plaza Road – Fair Lawn	
Bergen	Fair Lawn	1.50	2.41	Berdan Avenue	Southbound exit and entrance
Bergen	Fair Lawn	1.83	2.95	Fair Lawn Avenue (CR 76)	
Bergen	Fair Lawn	2.44	3.93	McBride Avenue	Northbound exit and entrance
Bergen	Fair Lawn	2.88	4.63	CR 507 (Maple Avenue) – Glen Rock, Ridgewood, Paterson, Hawthorne	CR 507 not signed northbound
Bergen	Glen Rock	3.17	5.10	De Boer Drive	Northbound exit and entrance
Passaic	Hawthorne	3.54	5.70	Lincoln Avenue (CR 653) – Ridgewood	Northbound exit and entrance
Passaic	Hawthorne	3.76	6.05	Utter Avenue	
Passaic	Hawthorne	4.40	7.08	Goffle Road (CR 659) – Midland Park, Ridgewood, Hawthorne, Paterson	
Bergen	Wyckoff	5.32	8.56	Grandview Avenue – Wyckoff	
Bergen	Wyckoff	5.97	9.61	Cedar Hill Avenue (CR 93) – Wyckoff	
Bergen	Wyckoff	6.93	11.15	Russell Avenue (CR S-93) – Wyckoff	
Bergen	Franklin Lakes	7.87	12.67	CR 502 (Ewing Avenue) – Franklin Lakes	
Bergen	Franklin Lakes	8.48	13.65	Summit Avenue (CR S-89) – Franklin Lakes	
Bergen	Franklin Lakes	8.82– 9.14	14.19– 14.71	Becton Dickinson Headquarters	Access via Becton Drive
Bergen	Franklin Lakes	9.45	15.21	High Mountain Road (CR 89) / Colonial Road (CR 117) – Franklin Lakes	
Bergen	Franklin Lakes	9.62	15.48	I-287 north to I-87 (New York Thruway / NY 17) – Mahwah	Northbound exit and southbound entrance; exit 59 on I-287
Bergen	Oakland	10.07	16.21	I-287 south – Oakland, Morristown	Northern terminus
1.000 mi = 1.609 km; 1.000 km = 0.621 mi: Incomplete access
