= County Route 503 (New Jersey) =

Road in Bergen County, New Jersey

County Route 503
- CR 503 highlighted in red

Route information
- Length: 17.95 mi (28.89 km)

Major junctions
- South end: Route 120 in East Rutherford
- US 46 in Little Ferry; Route 4 in Hackensack; CR 502 in Westwood
- North end: NY 304 at the New York state line

Location
- Country: United States
- State: New Jersey
- Counties: Bergen

Highway system
- County routes in New Jersey; 500-series routes
← CR 502	→ CR 504

County Route 503 (CR 503) is a county highway in Bergen County in the U.S. state of New Jersey. The highway extends 17.95 miles (28.89 kilometers) from Paterson Plank Road (Route 120) in East Rutherford to the New York state line at in Montvale, where it continues as New York State Route 304. It parallels the Hackensack River and New Jersey Transit's Pascack Valley Line for much of its route.

For the northern portion of the roadway, from River Edge to Montvale, it is known as Kinderkamack Road. In Hackensack, the roadway is known as Hackensack Avenue, River Street, and Moonachie Road. In Little Ferry, it is named Liberty Street, and in Moonachie to its southern terminus in Carlstadt it is known as Moonachie Road and Washington Avenue, respectively.

Kinderkamack comes from the language of the Lenape Native Americans, meaning "place of ceremonial dance and worship." During the American Revolutionary War, General Lafayette's division camped in what is now Oradell at Kinderkamack and Soldier Hill Roads.

== Route description ==
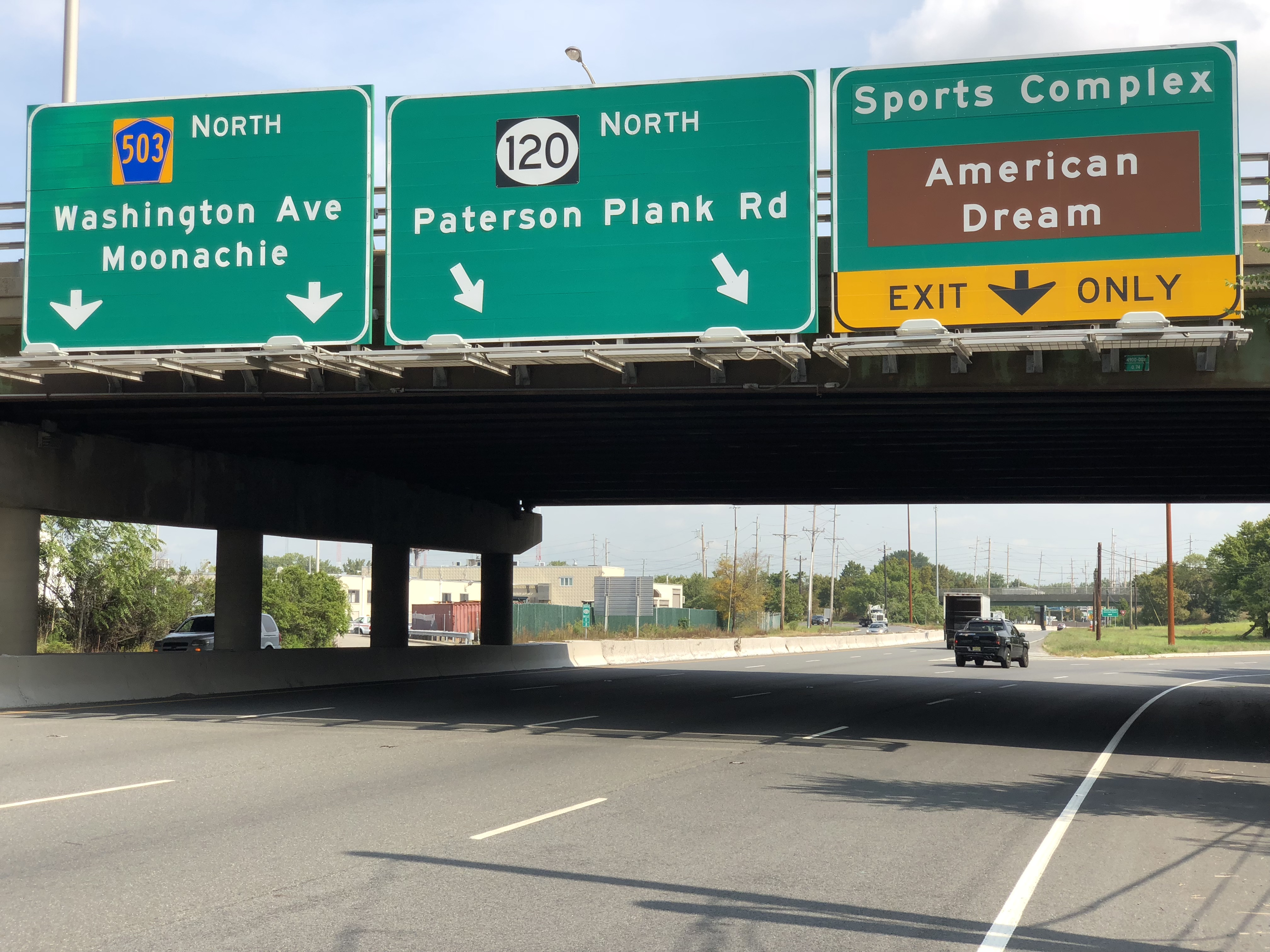
View northbound at the southern terminus of CR 503 at Route 120 in East Rutherford

While signage directing traffic to CR 503 exists on westbound Route 3, CR 503 officially begins at Route 120. Traffic following Route 120 around the Meadowlands Sports Complex exits (or enters) in East Rutherford, while CR 503 traffic continues straight ahead into Carlstadt. Through the industrial area of the borough of Carlstadt, the four-lane highway, divided in some sections, is called Washington Avenue.

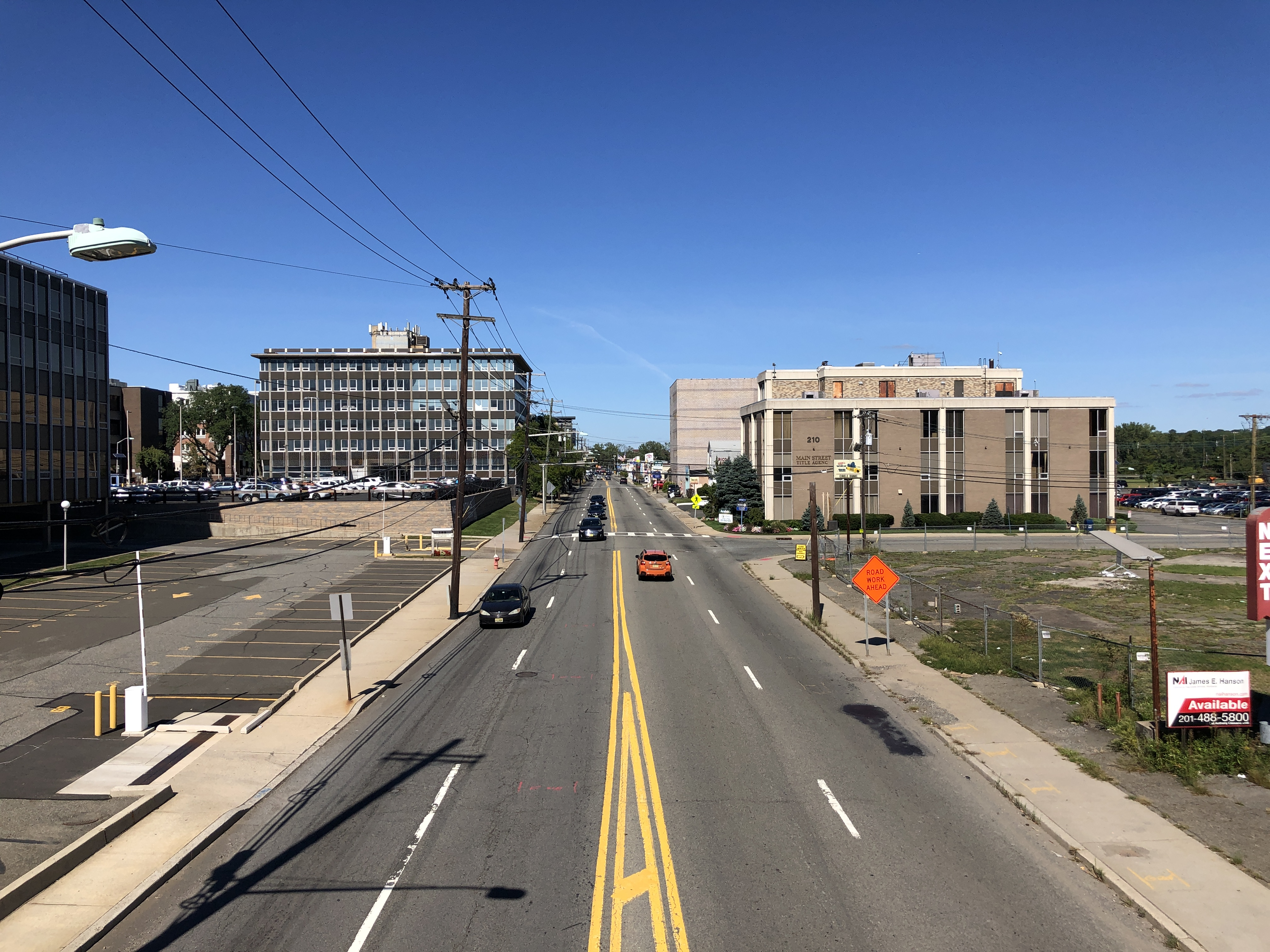
View northbound along CR 503 in Hackensack

At Moonachie Avenue, CR 503 crosses into Moonachie and becomes known as Moonachie Road. The highway continues as a two-lane road through Little Ferry, there called Liberty Street, where it intersects US 46. Entering South Hackensack, the road again becomes Moonachie Road and continues into Hackensack. At the end of Moonachie Road, CR 503 then turns left onto the four-lane River Street, which passes under Interstate 80 and the New York, Susquehanna and Western Railway's New Jersey Subdivision line. Near the Fairleigh Dickinson University campus, River Street becomes Hackensack Avenue, which shortly crosses Route 4 and then the Coles Brook into River Edge near The Shops at Riverside mall.

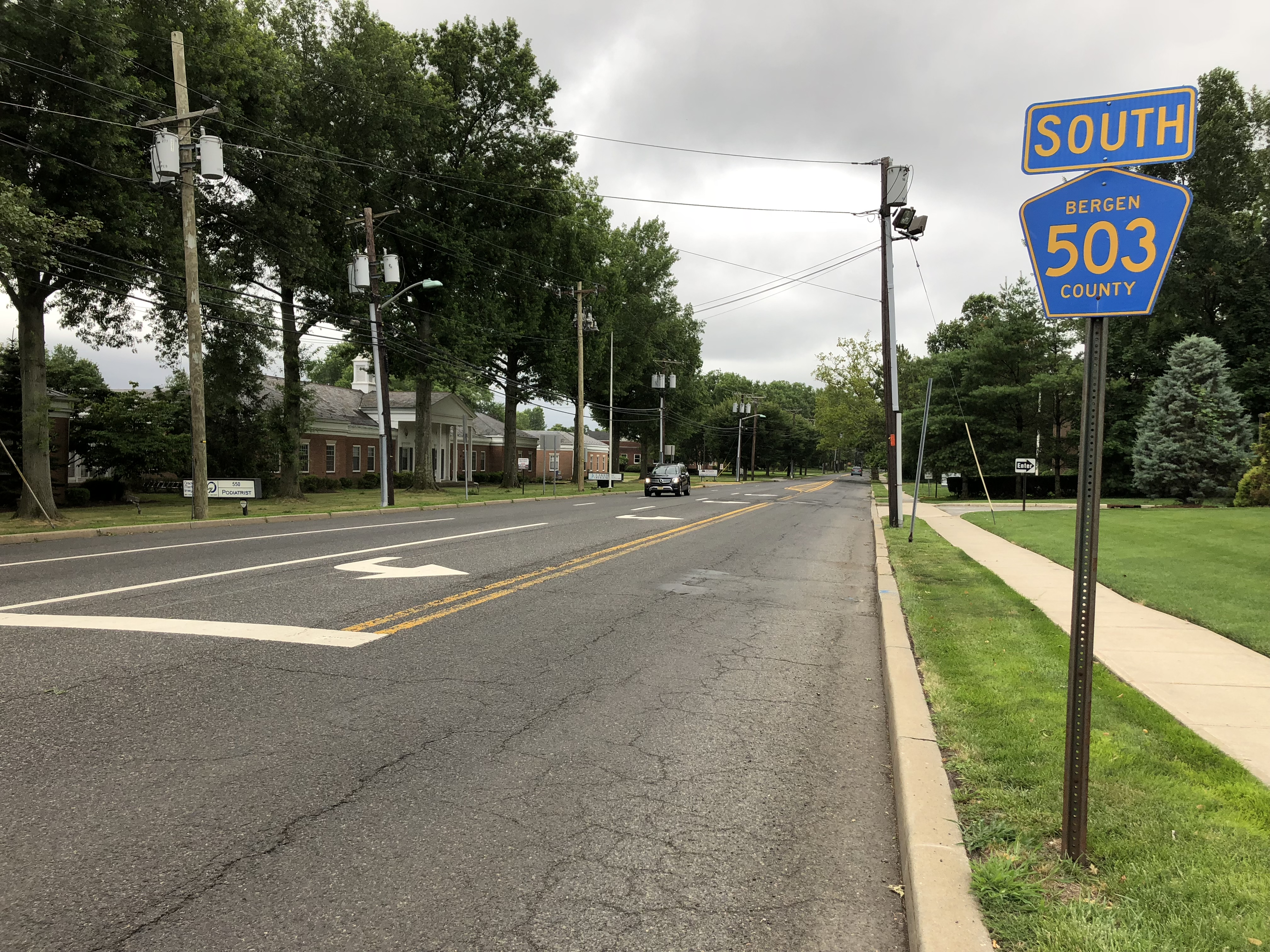
View south along CR 503 past CR 115 in Oradell.

Near the Steuben House in River Edge, CR 503 turns left onto Main Street and crosses the Pascack Valley Line at grade before turning northward onto Kinderkamack Road. Kinderkamack Road itself begins just south of the interchange with CR 503 and Main Street, at Johnson Avenue. CR 503 then continues north through Oradell, Emerson, Westwood, Hillsdale, Woodcliff Lake, Park Ridge, and Montvale. Most of this 10-mile (16-km) stretch is two-lane road with some dividers and margins while running through the suburbs. In Emerson, a divider is present while crossing the Pascack Valley Line between Ackerman Avenue and Linwood Avenue. In Westwood, it comes to an interchange with CR 502 at Old Hook Road. The northbound and southbound alignments split briefly in Montvale, where the highway crosses the Pascack Valley Line one more time at Grand Avenue (CR 2).

At the New York state line, Kinderkamack Road becomes four-lane Pearl Street and NY 304 in the village of Pearl River, becoming a freeway shortly after.

== Major intersections ==
The entire route is in Bergen County.

Location	mi	km	Destinations	Notes
East Rutherford	0.00	0.00	Route 120 (Paterson Plank Road) to Route 3 – Sports Complex	Southern terminus; former Route 20
Little Ferry	3.26	5.25	US 46 (Sylvan Avenue) – Lodi, Ridgefield Park	
Hackensack	7.04	11.33	Route 4 to G.S. Parkway	Interchange
Westwood	12.97	20.87	CR 502 (Old Hook Road) – Closter	
Montvale	17.95	28.89	NY 304 north	Continuation into New York
1.000 mi = 1.609 km; 1.000 km = 0.621 mi
