= Mass transit (disambiguation) =

Mass transit refers to shared transportation services used by the general public.

Mass transit may also refer to:

- Rapid transit, high-capacity public transport generally found in urban areas
- Mass Transit incident (professional wrestling), a professional wrestling incident that occurred in 1996
- Mass Transit Railway, the rapid transit railway system in Hong Kong
- Mass Transit Super Bowl, a transportation plan for the 2014 Super Bowl
- "Mass Transit", the fourth expansion park for the city building game Cities: Skylines

== See also ==
- Massachusetts Bay Transportation Authority, an eastern-Massachusetts mass-transit agency
- MassTransit-Project, open-source, .NET-based software
- MassTransit, converter software between mass-spectrometry-data formats
- Mass transfer, motion of matter
