= James Simpson (government official) =

American government officer

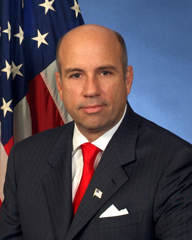
- Simpson as Federal Transit Administrator

Commissioner of the New Jersey Department of Transportation
- In office 2010–2014
- Governor: Chris Christie
- Preceded by: Stephen Dilts
- Succeeded by: Joseph Bertoni

Administrator of the Federal Transit Administration
- In office 2006–2008
- President: George W. Bush
- Preceded by: Jennifer L. Dorn
- Succeeded by: Peter Rogoff

Personal details
- Party: Republican

James Stuart Simpson is the former commissioner of New Jersey's Department of Transportation (NJDOT), from 2010–2014, and a former federal government official and moving company executive.

He became Federal Transit Administrator (head of the Federal Transit Administration) in the United States Department of Transportation on August 10, 2006. Simpson began his career in transportation over 30 years ago as a tractor-trailer driver for a local moving company and advanced within the company to shape it into a major international business. For his work in the moving industry, the U.S. Department of Commerce honored Simpson with an International Trade Award for service excellence.

In 1995, New York Governor George Pataki appointed Simpson as a commissioner of the New York Metropolitan Transportation Authority (MTA) where he served for 10 years, including stints as chairman of the Real Estate & Planning Committee and the Safety and Security Committee. Immediately following 9/11, he was designated the primary MTA Board liaison to the Governor’s and Mayor’s Offices in coordinating transit activities at the World Trade Center site.

Gov. Pataki also appointed Simpson as a member of the New York State Job Development Authority Board. Under New York Mayor Rudy Giuliani’s administration, he was appointed Honorary Deputy Police Commissioner for the New York City Police Department. The New York City Police Department’s Honor Legion also honored him with a membership. In addition, Mayor Giuliani appointed him to the New York City Work Force Investment Board.

Simpson's other civic roles include serving as a director of the New York City Partnership and Chamber of Commerce; and, chairman of the Staten Island Chamber of Commerce. In June 2015, he joined the board of Zippy Shell.

He graduated magna cum laude from St. John’s University, with a B.S. in managerial science and economics. He is a 1995 Alumnus of the David Rockefeller Fellowship Program and a 1996 British American Fellow.

In 2004, President George W. Bush nominated and the United States Senate confirmed Simpson to the St. Lawrence Seaway Advisory Board, where he was elevated to chairman.

Simpson left the position with NJDOT on June 6, 2014.

== See also ==
- George Warrington
- James Weinstein
- Governorship of Chris Christie
