= Mass Transit Super Bowl =

Transportation plan for the 2014 Super Bowl

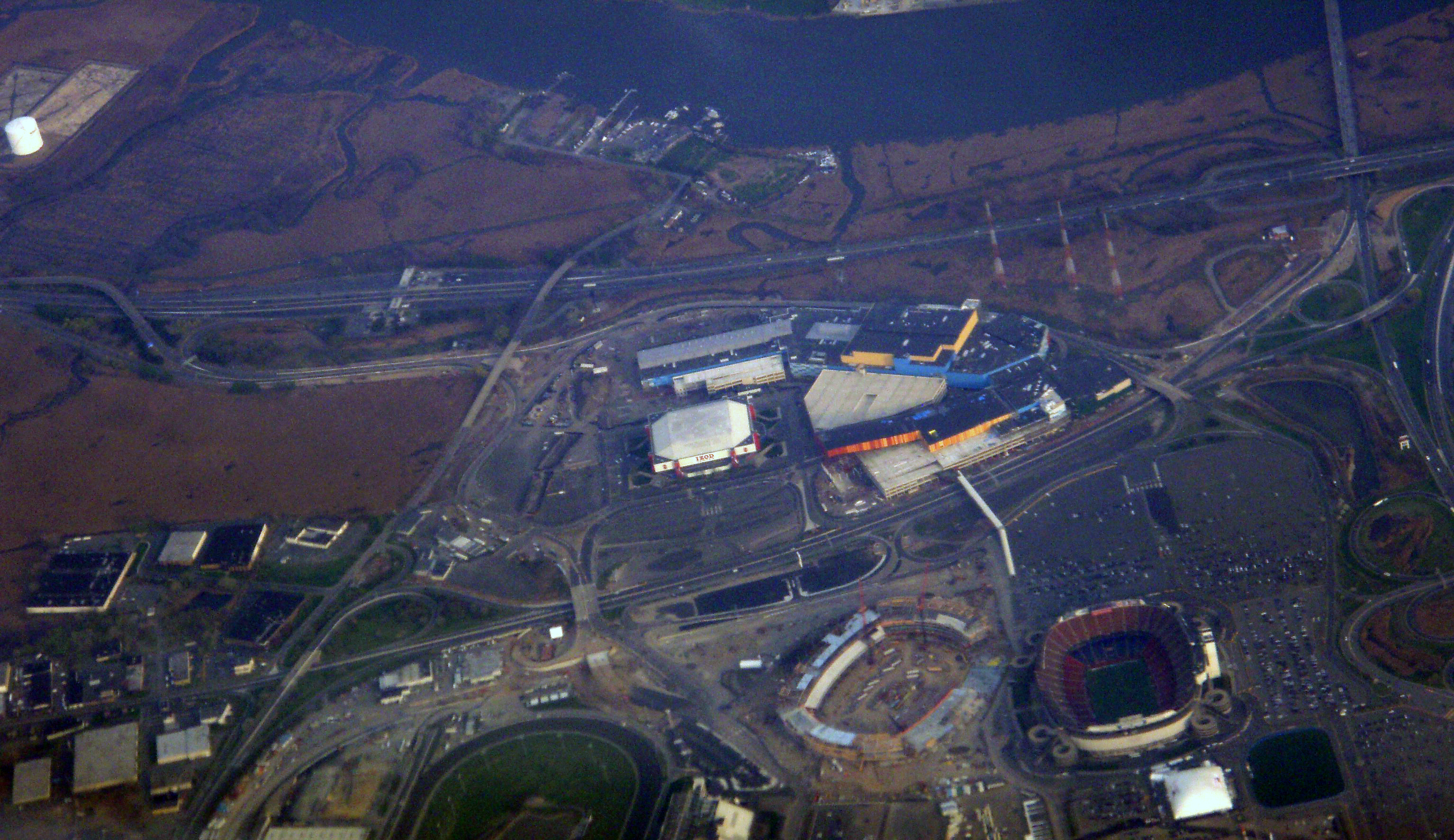
MetLife Stadium, located at the Meadowlands Sports Complex, cannot normally be reached by walking.

The Mass Transit Super Bowl was a public transportation plan and marketing strategy conceived for Super Bowl XLVIII and Super Bowl Week, a series of events leading up to the February 2, 2014, football game between the Denver Broncos and the Seattle Seahawks. It was originally projected that over 400,000 people would come to the New York–New Jersey region for the game and related activities, and that over 80,000 would attend the game itself; actual patronage of the metropolitan area during that time was projected to be over 500,000. Metropolitan area transit agencies worked with the National Football League, organizers of the event, and developed special services, schedules, fares, and maps to promote the use of mass transit during the week, which began with the arrival of teams on January 26.

On game day, those traveling by train experienced overcrowding and long delays due to miscalculated estimations and an unanticipated surge of passengers, which led to complaints and criticism.

== Geography and transportation network ==
Super Bowl XLVIII was the first to be played outdoors in a cold weather environment, and the first in which two US states (New York and New Jersey) hosted the event. The combination of sports facilities in New Jersey and hotel facilities in New York was a major factor in the NFL decision to choose the location. Activities related to the Super Bowl were spread across the region on both sides of the Hudson River. More than 20 miles separated Super Bowl Boulevard in the Manhattan borough of New York City and the Florham Park facility, where the Broncos practiced in New Jersey. In between is Jersey City, where the teams stayed, the Prudential Center in Newark, site of Media Day, and the stadium and Seahawks' practice facility in New Jersey Meadowlands in East Rutherford, a relatively remote location several miles from central business districts which hosted events in the week leading up to the game.

It was anticipated that nearly 400,000 people would visit the region during Super Bowl Week and that on game day, 10,000 to 12,000 would take the train and 40,000 to 50,000 would travel by bus. While those numbers were not extraordinary in comparison to weekday commuting in the region, many out-of-town visitors were unfamiliar with the local transportation systems.

Transportation plans for what was billed the first "mass transit Super Bowl" were announced in December 2013. Public transportation in the metro area is provided by a variety of public agencies and private companies, namely New Jersey Transit (NJT), the Port Authority of New York and New Jersey (PANYNJ), the Metropolitan Transportation Authority (MTA), New York City Transit Authority (NYCTA), Amtrak, and New York Waterway. While there is some coordination and joint operations and fare-sharing within the vast complex transit network, each is independent of the other, and charges its own fares, sometimes leading to complicated transfers and other logistical complications between them. NJT, as lead agency, in conjunction with metropolitan partner agencies and the host committee developed special services, fares, and maps and advertising campaigns to promote the use of public transportation during Super Bowl Week.

== Super Bowl Week ==
In the week leading up to the game, there were various events throughout, some of which are NFL-sponsored. Highlights of the week as presented by the Host Committee were:

- January 26 – Arrival at Newark Liberty International Airport and welcome in Jersey City
- January 27 – Super Bowl Kickoff Spectacular, including fireworks by Macy's at Liberty State Park, Jersey City
- January 28 – Super Bowl Media Day at Prudential Center, Newark
- January 29 to February 1 – Super Bowl Boulevard on Broadway between 34th and 47th Streets, Midtown Manhattan
- February 2 – Super Bowl, NFL On Location, and NFL Tailgate Party at Meadowlands Sports Complex

== Mass transit ==
=== Regional Transit Diagram 2014 ===
The Regional Transit Diagram 2014 was produced specifically for the Super Bowl, and according to the Metropolitan Transportation Authority, "shows all inter-connections between the regional transit services, and highlights with a football icon those areas where Super Bowl related events will occur on both sides of the Hudson River. The diagram will appear on all transit provider websites, as well as on Super Bowl websites, guides, publications, mobile apps, and folding pocket maps". It is based on a New York City Subway map originally designed by Massimo Vignelli in 1972. The map shows all the commuter rail, subway, PATH, and light rail operations in urban northeastern New Jersey and Midtown and Lower Manhattan highlighting Super Bowl Boulevard (Broadway with NFL/Super Bowl exhibits), Prudential Center, MetLife Stadium and Jersey City. As of September 2018, the diagram is still updated online.

=== Meadowlands Rail Line ===
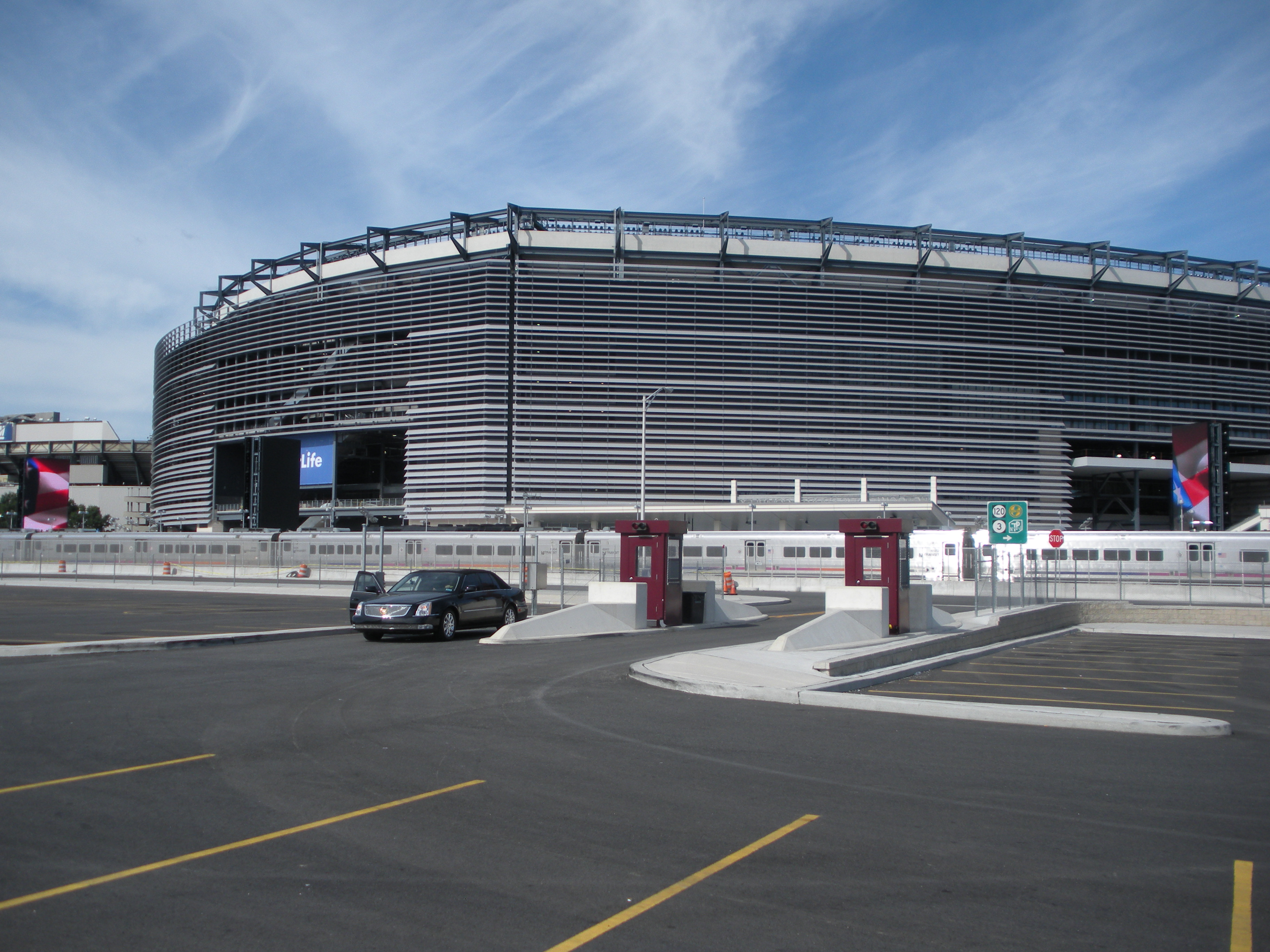
Meadowlands Station is adjacent to MetLife Stadium (pictured)

The Meadowlands Rail Line is a shuttle service between Secaucus Junction, a major interchange on the Northeast Corridor and Meadowlands Station adjacent to the stadium. In anticipation of increased ridership for the Super Bowl, platforms at Secaucus were extended 120 ft (37 m) to accommodate multi-level 10-car train sets which can handle about 1,400 to 1,800 passengers per trip, moving about 14,000 or 15,000 people an hour. Eleven lines of New Jersey Transit Rail Operations and the Metro North Port Jervis Line converge at the station, which is one stop from New York Penn Station, Hoboken Terminal, Newark Penn Station or Broad Street Station. While Amtrak does not normally stop at Secaucus, several trains were scheduled to stop there on game day. Only ticket-holders and those with a "Fan Pass" reservation for a ticket, could board the Meadowlands train once they have passed a security checkpoint.

=== Fan Express ===
The "Fan Express" was a pre-ticketed bus service with direct non-stop express service to and from nine locations. Buses stopped at the Waldorf Astoria New York, Madison Square Park, Time Warner Center, Sixth Avenue near the Washington Square Park in the West Village, and Battery Park City in Manhattan. In addition, they stopped in the Plaza at Harmon Meadow, the Hanover Marriott, and Newark Liberty Airport Marriott Hotel, in New Jersey. Tickets, which cost $51, were for specific scheduled bus departures.

=== Super Pass ===
NJ Transit offered a "Super Pass" that provided unlimited system-wide rides between January 27 and February 3, including the Meadowlands Rail Line. The 8-day pass, in both commemorative and non-commemorative versions, cost $50.

=== Enhanced service ===
Collectively, during Super Bowl week, NJT, PATH, and the MTA provided more frequent rail service and faster connections to support expected visitors. New Jersey Transit bus operations was also adapted. The transit agencies, within their individual time frames, each halted ongoing construction.

The Port Authority Trans-Hudson, or PATH, mass transit system which connects Manhattan, Jersey City, Hoboken Terminal, and Newark Penn Station, increased service on lines.

New Jersey Transit Bus Operations, both within the state and to the Port Authority Bus Terminal in Midtown Manhattan, implemented service changes and enhanced schedules. NJT Rail provided enhanced service.

Hudson–Bergen Light Rail in Hudson County increased the number of trams running daily after 2 pm from January 27 to February 2, with all three branches on February 1 and 2.

On Metro-North Railroad's East of Hudson lines, there was enhanced post-AM peak inbound service, lengthened trains, and limited extra outbound late evening service Wednesday to Friday (January 29–31). Seventeen additional New Haven Line and two additional Hudson Line trains was added for Saturday, February 1).

The New York City Subway created a commemorative MetroCard. Rush-hour-level service operated on the 42nd Street Shuttle on Saturday, February 1. On game day, there were 36 midday subway trains per hour (or about 6 per service) providing access to New York Penn Station. In January 2014, a dozen New York City Subway trains were wrapped with ads advertising the Jaguar F-Type in preparation for the Super Bowl. The ads were mainly targeted at football fans going to watch the Super Bowl.

The Long Island Rail Road to Penn Station increased afternoon/evening inbound service Wednesday–Friday and 30-minute service on major branches during peak travel periods on Saturday, February 1.

== Traffic management ==
=== Lincoln Tunnel XBL ===
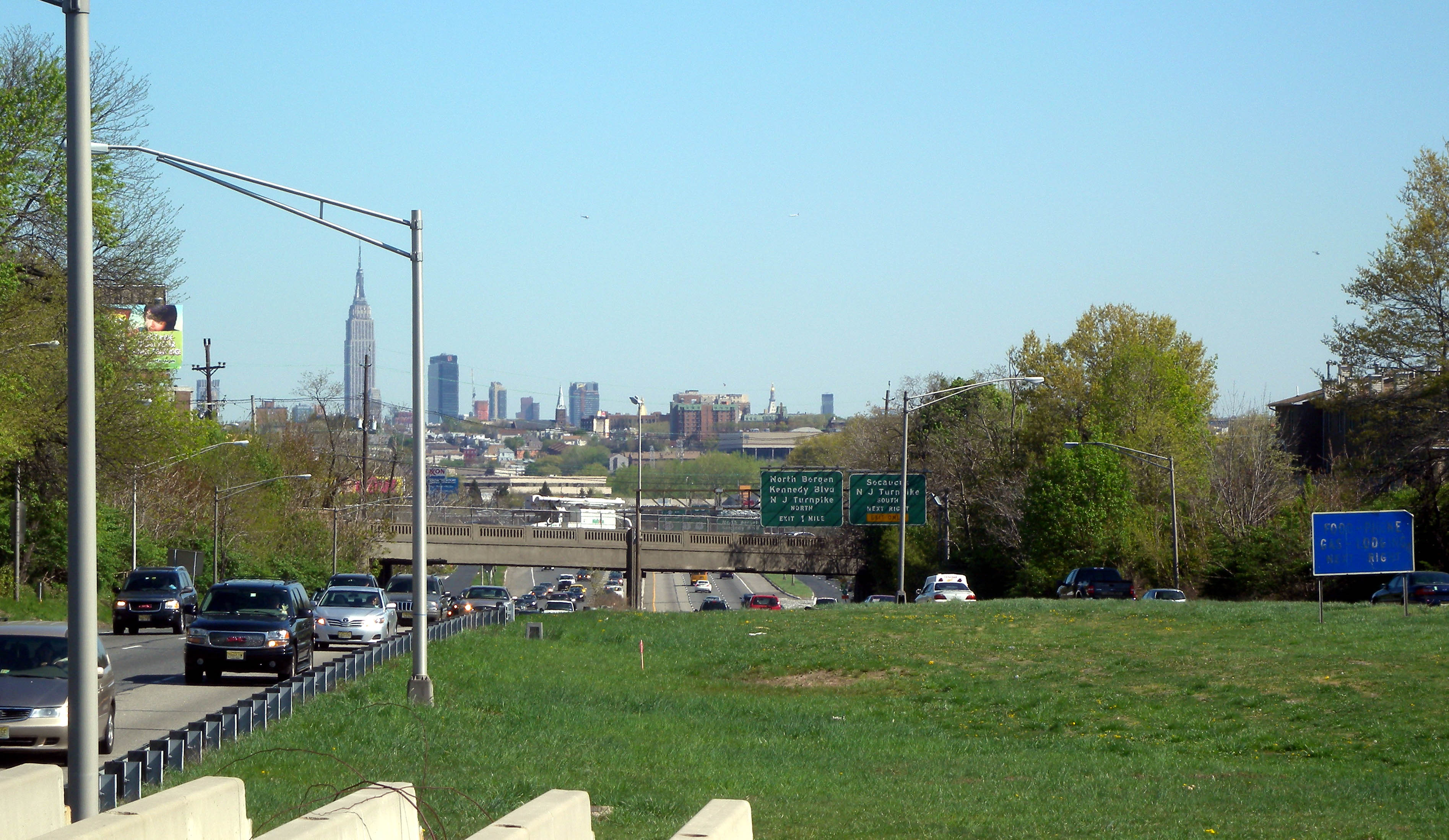
Route 3, the main connector from the Lincoln Tunnel looking east to Manhattan

The main route from Manhattan to the sports complex is via the Lincoln Tunnel, New Jersey Route 495 and New Jersey Route 3. The Lincoln Tunnel XBL, or exclusive bus lane, normally runs eastbound during morning rush hours. Four miles of Route 3 were repaved in 2013. On February 2 the PANYNJ, which operates the XBL, created two westbound lanes for the Super Bowl. To help alleviate traffic congestion, additional lanes were dedicated to traffic going into New Jersey before the game, and then were dedicated to traffic going into New York after the game. There were also dedicated approach lanes for those with a priority access NFL placard on their vehicles. At the George Washington Bridge, new variable message signs (VMS) provided real-time travel information and special traffic advisories.

=== MASSTR ===
The teams and majority of attendees to the sports complex arrived by bus, with some arriving with other motor vehicles. The Meadowlands Adaptive Signal System for Traffic Reduction, or MASSTR, is an intelligent transportation system for a network of traffic controlled intersections with vehicle detectors which permits "real-time" traffic regulation within a forty square mile region. Commissioned by the New Jersey Meadowlands Commission it was first installed in 2012 and expanded to be in place and operational for the 2014 Super Bowl. The New Jersey Department of Transportation suspended all roadway construction in the 20-mile radius of the stadium. With the possibility that it might snow, the state planned numerous ways to keeps roads clear, including spreading of brine and salt, and having plows on stand-by.

About 2,000 parking passes and 300 charter bus permits weren't used on Super Bowl Sunday. The NFL had estimated that as many as 50 fans would ride to the game per charter bus and an average of three people would travel per car.

== Security and access ==
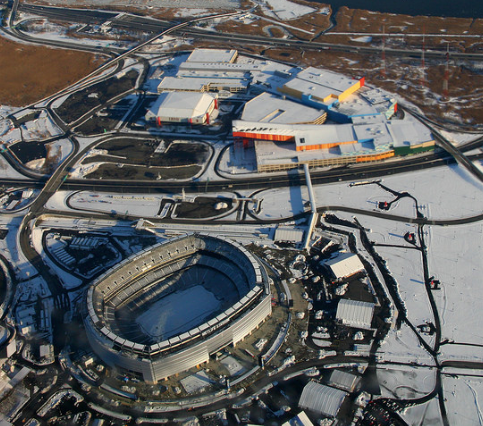
All vehicles entering security periphery set up around MetLife Stadium were required to remain for the duration of the game, prohibiting personal autos, taxis, and regular bus service from dropping off or picking up passengers. Pedestrians were not permitted. Meadowlands Rail Line is adjacent to the stadium across the road from Izod Center and the then-future American Dream Meadowlands.

The Super Bowl is considered a top-level National Special Security Event. New Jersey State Police and the NFL host committee installed a 2.5 miles (4.0 km) chain-link perimeter fence around the Meadowlands Sports Complex. The area was in "lock-down" for a week prior to the game. All vehicles entering and leaving were scanned, a precaution through game day. The area was patrolled on land, and by both air, and water, since it is surrounded by wetlands. More than 3,000 security guards and 700 police officers were scheduled for duty on game day. The sports complex is located at the intersection of number of highways. Security planners planned to strictly limit and regulate access to the area. Event parking spaces were greatly reduced to 13,000 with a cost of $150 each, tailgate parties restricted, and walking to the venue was strictly prohibited for both safety and security reasons.

The team hotels, located along the Hudson River Waterfront Walkway in Jersey City, and the Hudson River, were inspected and patrolled on a 24-hour basis.

Mass transit is seen as a high-security risk. According to the Transportation Security Administration passengers boarding trains were limited in what they carry on the train and some were screened. Buses and other vehicles entering the security perimeter were also scanned.

Costs for security at the Meadowlands were approximately $5 million, which was offset by grants, costing taxpayers approximately $1.35 million.

== Overcrowding and delays ==
At the Super Bowl XLVIII on February 2, 2014, mistaken estimates of rail ridership by the NFL led to over-crowding and delays on the Meadowlands Rail Line. New Jersey Transit was in charge of operating the Meadowlands Rail Line shuttle between Secaucus and Meadowlands. Approximately 28,000 people took the shuttle to Meadowlands before the Super Bowl, and were faced with waits of up to 90 minutes, due to security delays. Additionally, riders at Secaucus complained of the lack of air conditioning. After the game ended, more than 33,000 people took the shuttle at Meadowlands back to Secaucus, far over the Meadowlands station's regular operating capacity. At one point, fans still inside were asked to remain in the stadium until more trains were dispatched to load passengers from the station. A plethora of news sources provided coverage of the plan's poor execution.

== Legislative/NJT inquiry and law firm report ==
=== NJT costs ===
NJT spent a total of $12.4 million for Super Bowl-related construction initiatives. It had also spent $7.7 million in 2012 to for a new bus service facility that tripled loading capacity at Secaucus Junction in order to allow for additional service during special events at the Meadowlands Sports Complex for emergency-related contingency operations, such as bus diversions from New Jersey Route 495. This came concurrently with $2.5 million in 2013 to extend lower-level platforms at the station to accommodate ten-car trains.

NJT made a special allocation of $5.3 million for Super Bowl-related expenses such as enhanced rail/bus service and additional security necessary to support the event, given a Level One security designation on par with a presidential inauguration. In May 2013 NJT approved a $1.2 million contract with AECOM, a transportation planning organisation for Super Bowl-related planning and support, including contingency planning and risk management. The chair of the Lackawanna Coalition, a commuter advocacy group, at a NJT board meeting on May 8, 2013, stated that the NJT riders were not beneficiaries of the study, but rather the NFL and therefore should be paid by them.

The scope of work included:

- Conducting field observations and preparing “general recommendations for accommodating visitors and guests at Secaucus Junction, Hoboken Terminal, Newark Penn Station and New York Penn Station.”
- Developing diagrams and graphics “to address any issues or challenges with the proposed major transportation facilities.”
- Performing initial risk assessment of the initial operating plan, including a list of contingency plans.
- Convening a working group of transportation officials who were involved in the planning of the Indianapolis, Dallas and New Orleans Super Bowls, and the London Olympic Games to review the transportation-management plan for the Super Bowl.

=== Inquiry and report ===
On February 18, 2014, James Weinstein announced that he would resign as director of NJT on March 2. An initial inquiry by the New Jersey Assembly scheduled for February 21, 2014 was postponed, as representatives of NJT and the host committee of the National Football League, partners in the creation of the transportation plan, were unable to attend. James Simpson, Commissioner of the New Jersey Department of Transportation commissioned other board members to reschedule the hearing and retained retired U.S. District Court Judge Dennis M. Cavanaugh to lead the inquiry, which included representatives from the New Jersey State Police and NFL, as well as NJT.

The New Jersey Senate Oversight Committee scheduled a hearing on the topic for March 10, 2014 which newly appointed Executive Director Ronnie Hakim requested be cancelled. and was not attended by representatives of NJT or the NFL. In a hearing focused on spending and planning on May 2, 2014, Hakim told a state Senate committee that NJT's expenses for getting fans to MetLife Stadium during Super Bowl week were $7.2 million, including overtime, which was offset by $1.6 million in transit fares and advertising on its website, trains and the Secaucus Junction station bought by Pepsi}.

A long-awaited study released in August 2014, produced by the Boston-based law firm of McElroy, Deutsch, Mulvaney & Carpenter at a cost of $350,00 paid by NJT, cites failure of government agencies and the private consultants to accurately predict how many people would arrive by train, management conflicts within NJT, and crowd control by the private firm S.A.F.E. Management as causes for delays and overcrowding.

Ultimately, 28,301 riders arrived and 35,264 left the stadium via the Meadowlands Rail Line. Conflicting train ridership predictions by the three parties making them: AECOM (originally 32,00 and reduced to 17,000) NJT (originally 12,000 and later 13,500) and SP * Gameday, a subsidiary of Standard Parking hired by the NFL, (8,572) were not resolved prior to the game.

Trains were scheduled to depart every eight minutes. The closure of Pavilion 6 – a waiting area – by S.A.F.E. Management caused impediments to pedestrian traffic flow and prevented passengers from boarding trains, causing two of them to be delayed by a total of 56 minutes. Eventually the state police was required to bring order to the situation, but corralling of some passengers, while others were allowed to roam freely, caused indignation and conflicts, while the placement of waiting lines caused bottlenecks. This led some writers to call the entire plan a failure due to the inefficient use of transportation resources.

Conflicting opinions over the use of buses between James Weinstein, then the executive director of New Jersey Transit, and James S. Simpson, then commissioner of the Department of Transportation, also caused delays. While buses were on standby at Secaucus Junction, Weinstein was reluctant to deploy them. The first busload of passengers didn't leave until 11:32 p.m., about an hour after the game ended, after Christopher Porrino, chief counsel to Governor Chris Christie, called Weinstein and Simpson, and “strongly urged” Weinstein to send more buses.

== See also ==
- Transportation in New York City
- Transportation in New Jersey
- New York Waterway
- Gateway Project
- 7 Subway Extension
- North River Tunnels
- Sports in New York City
- Sports in Newark, New Jersey
- WrestleMania 35, 2019 event at Meadowlands where underestimates of likely rail use, and later finish than NJT expected, caused extensive delays.
