= Secaucus Junction =

NJ Transit and Metro-North Railroad station

Secaucus
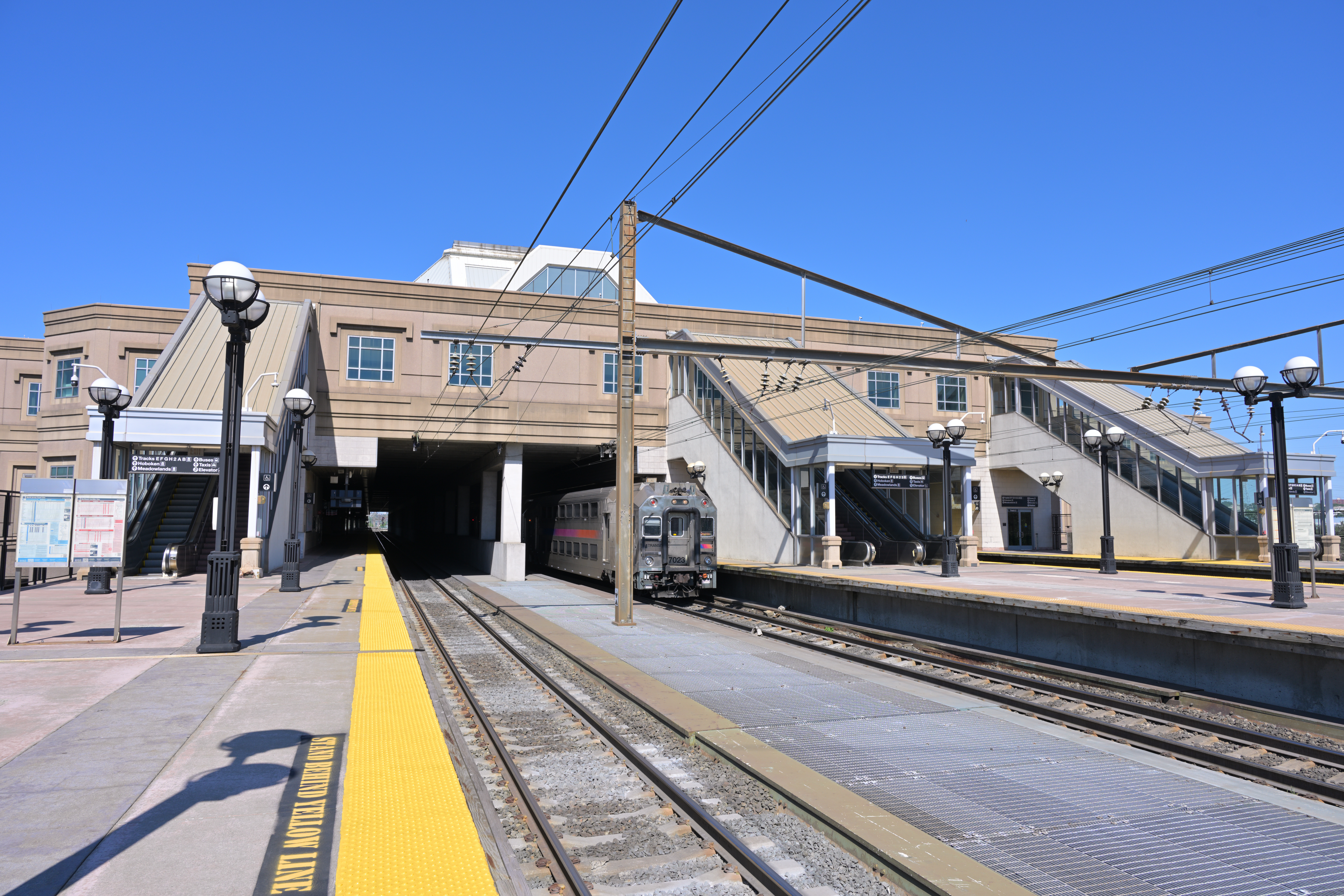
- Upper level platforms of Secaucus Junction in 2026

General information
- Other names: Frank R. Lautenberg Rail Station at Secaucus Junction
- Location: County Road & County Avenue; Secaucus, New Jersey
- Coordinates: 40°45′41″N 74°04′32″W
- Owner: New Jersey Transit
- Lines: Amtrak Northeast Corridor; All NJT lines (except for Atlantic City Line); Port Jervis Line
- Distance: 5.0 miles (8.0 km) from New York Penn Station
- Platforms: Upper level: 1 island platform, 2 side platforms; Lower level: 2 island platforms
- Tracks: 8
- Connections: NJ Transit Bus: 2, 78, 124, 129, 329; EZRide: 273, 566; Megabus; Town of Secaucus Shuttle; XChange Shuttle

Construction
- Platform levels: 2
- Parking: 1,080 spaces, 14 accessible spaces
- Cycle facilities: Yes
- Accessible: Yes

Other information
- Fare zone: 1

History
- Opened: 15 December 2003

Passengers
- 2025: 6,050 (average weekday)
- Rank: 4 of 153

Services
Preceding station	NJ Transit	Following station
Newark Penn toward Trenton	Northeast Corridor Line	New York Terminus
Newark Penn toward Bay Head	North Jersey Coast Line	New York Terminus
Newark Penn toward High Bridge	Raritan Valley Line limited service	New York Terminus
Newark Broad Street toward Hackettstown	Montclair–Boonton Line weekdays	New York Terminus
Newark Broad Street toward Hackettstown	Morristown Line	New York Terminus
Newark Broad Street toward Gladstone	Gladstone Branch limited service	New York Terminus
Wood-Ridge toward Spring Valley	Pascack Valley Line	Hoboken Terminus
Lyndhurst toward Suffern	Main Line	Hoboken Terminus
Rutherford toward Suffern	Bergen County Line	Hoboken Terminus
Meadowlands Terminus	Meadowlands Rail Line special event service	Hoboken Terminus
Preceding station	Metro-North Railroad	Following station
Ramsey Route 17 toward Port Jervis	Port Jervis Line	Hoboken Terminus
Location

Secaucus Junction (signed as Secaucus) is an intermodal transit hub served by New Jersey Transit (NJ Transit) and Metro-North Railroad in Secaucus, New Jersey. It is one of the busiest railway stations in North America.

The $450 million, 321,000-square-foot (29,800 m^{2}) station opened on December 15, 2003. It was known as Secaucus Transfer during planning stages and was dedicated as the Frank R. Lautenberg Rail Station at Secaucus Junction. U.S. Senator Frank Lautenberg, who died in 2013, was a transit advocate who had worked to allocate federal funds for the project.

The station is on the Northeast Corridor (NEC) five miles west of New York Penn Station and five miles east of Newark Penn Station. At Secaucus, the NEC crosses above the Main Line, which originates/terminates at Hoboken Terminal; the station allows passengers to transfer between the two lines. The station is served by all NJ Transit rail lines except for the Atlantic City Line and the Princeton Branch. Amtrak trains run through Secaucus but do not stop.

The Secaucus Junction Bus Plaza at the station opened in 2016.

== Purpose and history ==
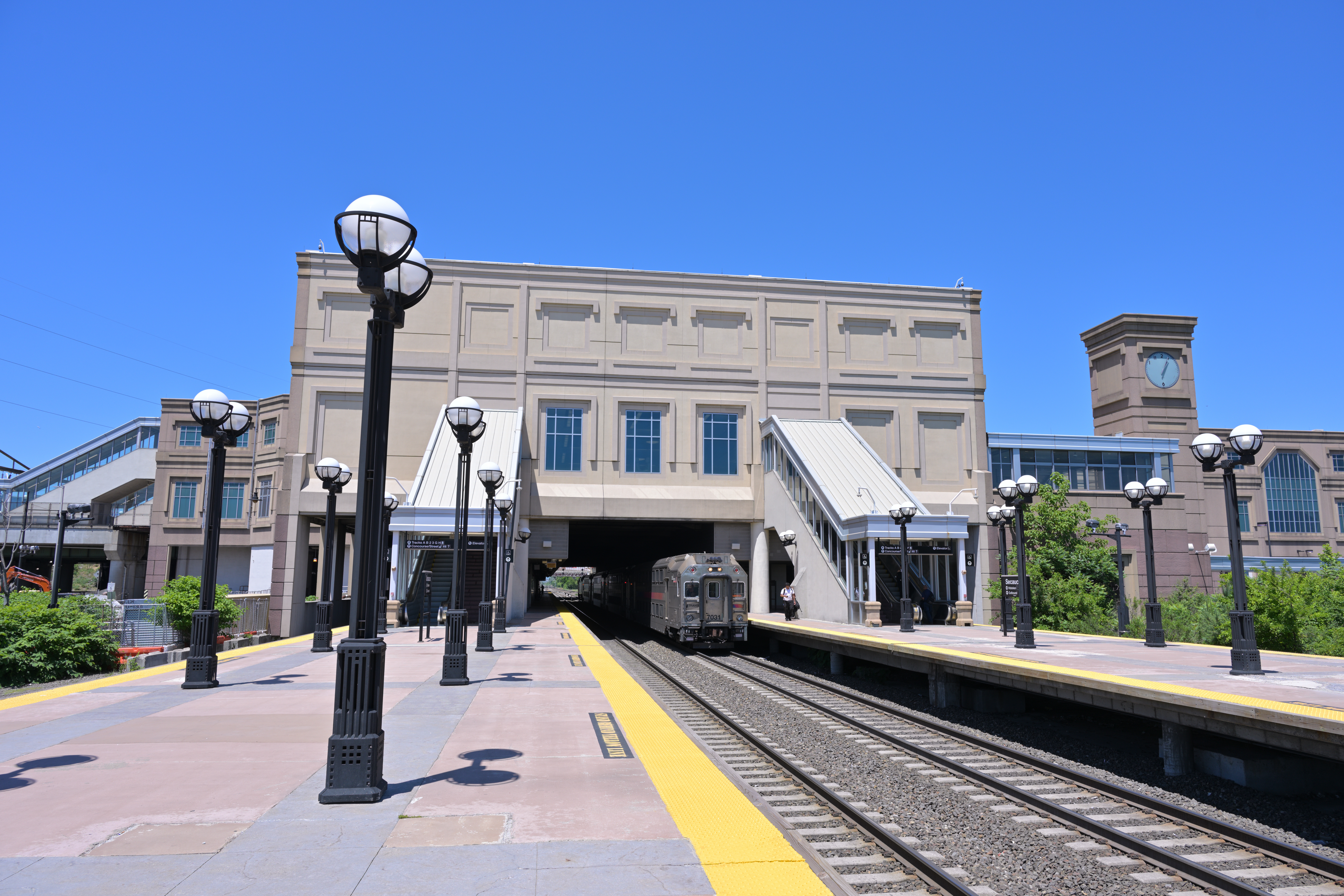
Secaucus Junction's lower-level platforms

NJ Transit's rail operations are split between two divisions, a legacy of their roots in separate railroads. The Hoboken Division consists of lines formerly part of the Erie Lackawanna Railway and its predecessors, while the Newark Division lines had once been part of the Pennsylvania Railroad and Central Railroad of New Jersey. Conrail ran both networks under contract to the New Jersey Department of Transportation from 1976 until handing them to NJ Transit in 1983. While the opening of the Kearny Connection and Waterfront Connection in 1996 allowed for the implementation of some interdivisional trains, including the "Midtown Direct" service to New York Penn Station on the Hoboken Division's Morris & Essex Lines, direct passenger transfers between the divisions were still not possible. Secaucus Junction was built to integrate the two systems and allow for transfers between trains on each division.

The two-track Northeast Corridor embankment was expanded to three tracks for a mile on each side of the station and to four tracks through the station itself, allowing Amtrak and nonstop NJT trains to pass stopped trains. The two-track Bergen County Line was re-aligned southwestward to join the two-track Main Line to pass through the station on the four-track lower level. The construction required the bodies from the Hudson County Burial Grounds to be disinterred and moved to another cemetery.

The station was built with little public parking, as NJT believed few passenger trips would originate there. In 2005, exit 15X on the adjacent New Jersey Turnpike opened to provide easier access to the station; two years later, it was the least-used interchange on the turnpike, possibly due in part to the lack of parking at the station. Despite NJT's prediction that the station would be used primarily for transfers, in 2008 an upscale "transit-oriented" housing development called Xchange at Secaucus Junction opened nearby with 799 units marketed toward Manhattan commuters, and is expected to expand to 1,538 total units by 2024. On June 1, 2009, Edison Parkfast, a private company, opened the first parking lot near the station, with space for 1,094 cars. Bicycle parking is also available.

On July 26, 2009, NJ Transit began rail service to the Meadowlands station at the Meadowlands Sports Complex, with Secaucus Junction being a transfer point for passengers. From 2009 to 2014, Secaucus Junction served trains coming from Metro-North's New Haven Line for New York Giants and New York Jets football games at the Meadowlands with 1:00 p.m. kickoffs on Sundays. In anticipation of increased ridership for Super Bowl XLVIII in February 2014, NJT extended the lower-level platforms at Secaucus Junction by 120 ft (37 m) to accommodate multi-level 10-car train sets which could handle about 1,400 to 1,800 passengers per trip. The capacity to handle crowds, a plan dubbed the Mass Transit Super Bowl, was seen as unsuccessful.

On June 5, 2013, two days after his death, a special Amtrak train stopped at the station to carry the coffin of U.S. Senator Frank Lautenberg to Washington, D.C. for his burial. On February 2, 2014, a limited number of Amtrak trains made stops at Secaucus for passengers going to Super Bowl XLVIII. Local officials have indicated a desire to have regular Amtrak services stop at Secaucus Junction after American Dream Meadowlands opened in October 2019; however, as of 2024, this has not been implemented.

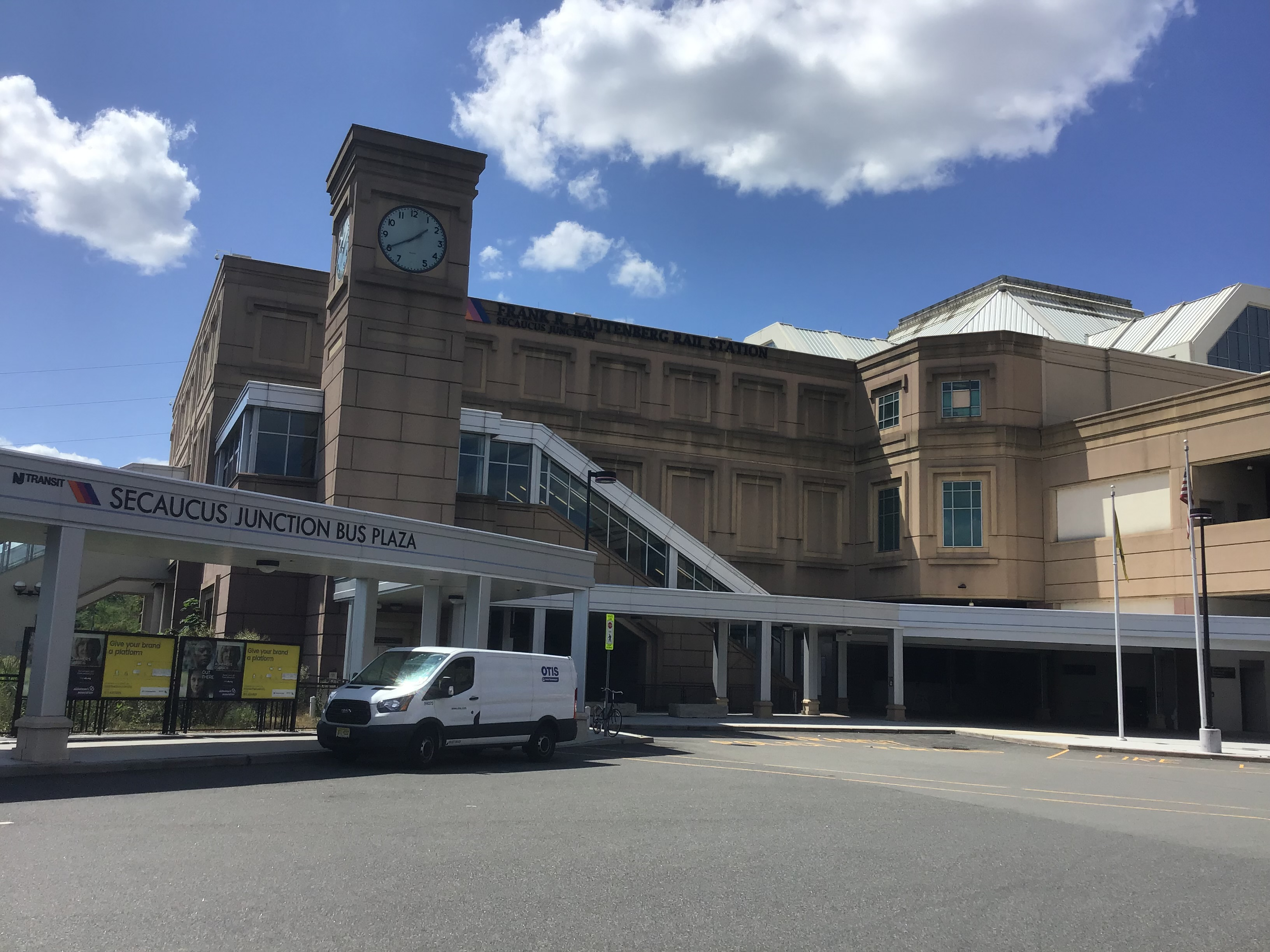
Bus-train transfer plaza

In March 2016, a new bus station with 14 bus berths opened; it is used for intermodal connections, and was intended to add redundancy to the transportation network.

In 2021 NJ Transit authorized studies for alternative options between the Meadowlands Sports Complex and Secaucus Junction including a bus "transitway". Funding for design was approved in 2023. The Secaucus-Meadowlands Transitway went into service prior to the 2026 FIFA World Cup.

== Station layout ==
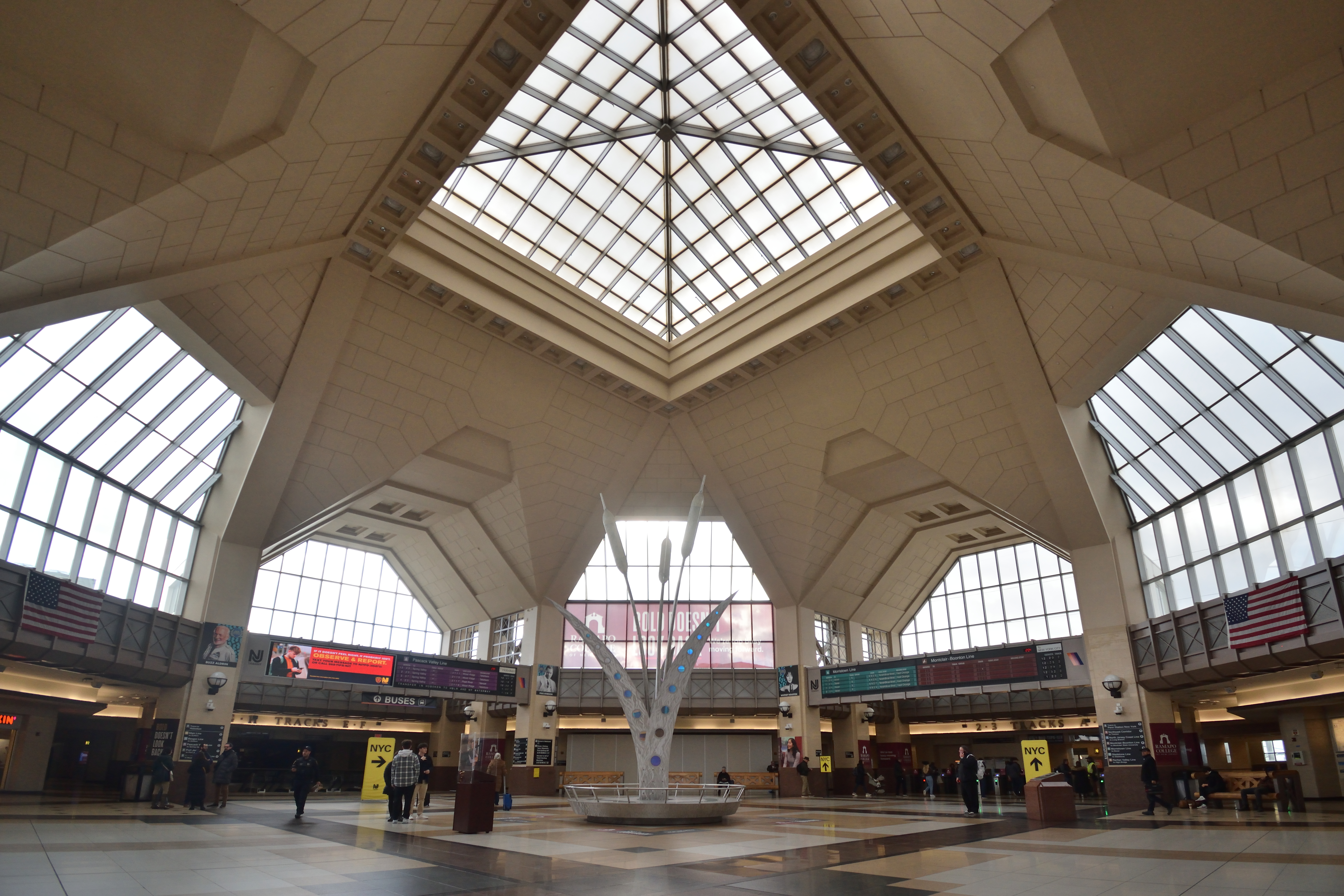
Concourse at Secaucus Junction

Despite its name, Secaucus Junction is not a true junction, in which trains can switch between lines; there is no rail connection between the upper and lower levels. The station has two platform levels connected by a third level on top. Such a loop, however, is proposed as part of the Gateway Project to improve commuter access to Manhattan.

- The lower platform level lacks electrification, and has four tracks and two island platforms serving the Bergen County Line, Main Line, Pascack Valley Line, Port Jervis Line, and Meadowlands Line trains, which originate and terminate at Hoboken Terminal.
- The upper platform level tracks are electrified, and carry trains to and from New York Penn Station (usually the Northeast Corridor, North Jersey Coast, Montclair-Boonton, and Morristown Lines) with four tracks and three platforms: two side platforms serving Tracks 2 and 3 (where nonstop trains usually bypass), and one island platform between Tracks A and B. With the above-mentioned exceptions, however, all Amtrak trains pass along the upper-level tracks without stopping.
- The upper concourse level has a New Jersey Transit customer service office, convenience store, and food court. To transfer between trains on different levels, passengers ascend to the upper concourse, pass through faregates, and descend to their destination platforms. At the center of this level is a 30-foot-high (9.1 m) steel, glass, and titanium sculpture of a cattail (abundant in the surrounding New Jersey Meadowlands) by San Francisco artist Cork Marcheschi. The tops of the cattails are lit from within in the purple, blue, and orange colors of NJ Transit.

== Proposed New York City Subway extension ==
On November 16, 2010, The New York Times reported that New York City Mayor Michael Bloomberg's administration was working on a plan to bring the 7 and <7> trains of the New York City Subway under the Hudson River to Secaucus Junction. An extension of that service from Times Square – 42nd Street to a new terminus at Eleventh Avenue and 34th Street, has already been built.

The extension would have taken the subway outside the city's and New York's borders and under the Hudson River for the first time. The plan would alleviate pressure on the NJ Transit/Amtrak route under the Hudson, after the cancellation of the Access to the Region's Core tunnel project by New Jersey Governor Chris Christie in October 2010. It would offer a direct route to Grand Central Terminal on the east side of Manhattan, while connecting with most other subway routes. New York City spent $250,000 for a consultant to conduct feasibility studies for the project. However, no design work commenced, nor were financing arrangements made. On October 26, 2011, Bloomberg reiterated his support for the project, while Christie also expressed general concurrence. In April 2013, the Metropolitan Transportation Authority rejected the proposed extension, citing lack of funding. However, it was reconsidered again in 2018.

== Gateway Project ==
The Gateway Project, a series of infrastructure improvements along the NEC between Newark Penn Station and New York Penn Station, includes a proposal to build the so-called Secaucus Loop or Bergen Loop, tracks connecting the Main Line and the NEC at Secaucus, thus creating a true junction station, eliminating the need for passengers to change levels to continue their trips. As part of the second phase of the Gateway Project, the loop is projected to be constructed between 2024 and 2030.

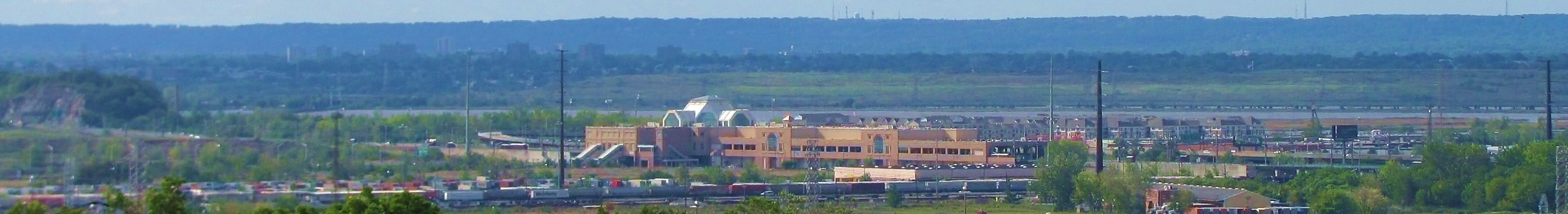
View of Secaucus Junction from the western Hudson Palisades

== See also ==
- Jamaica station – station on the nearby Long Island Rail Road that serves a similar purpose to Secaucus Junction
