= Meadowlands station =

NJ Transit rail station

Meadowlands
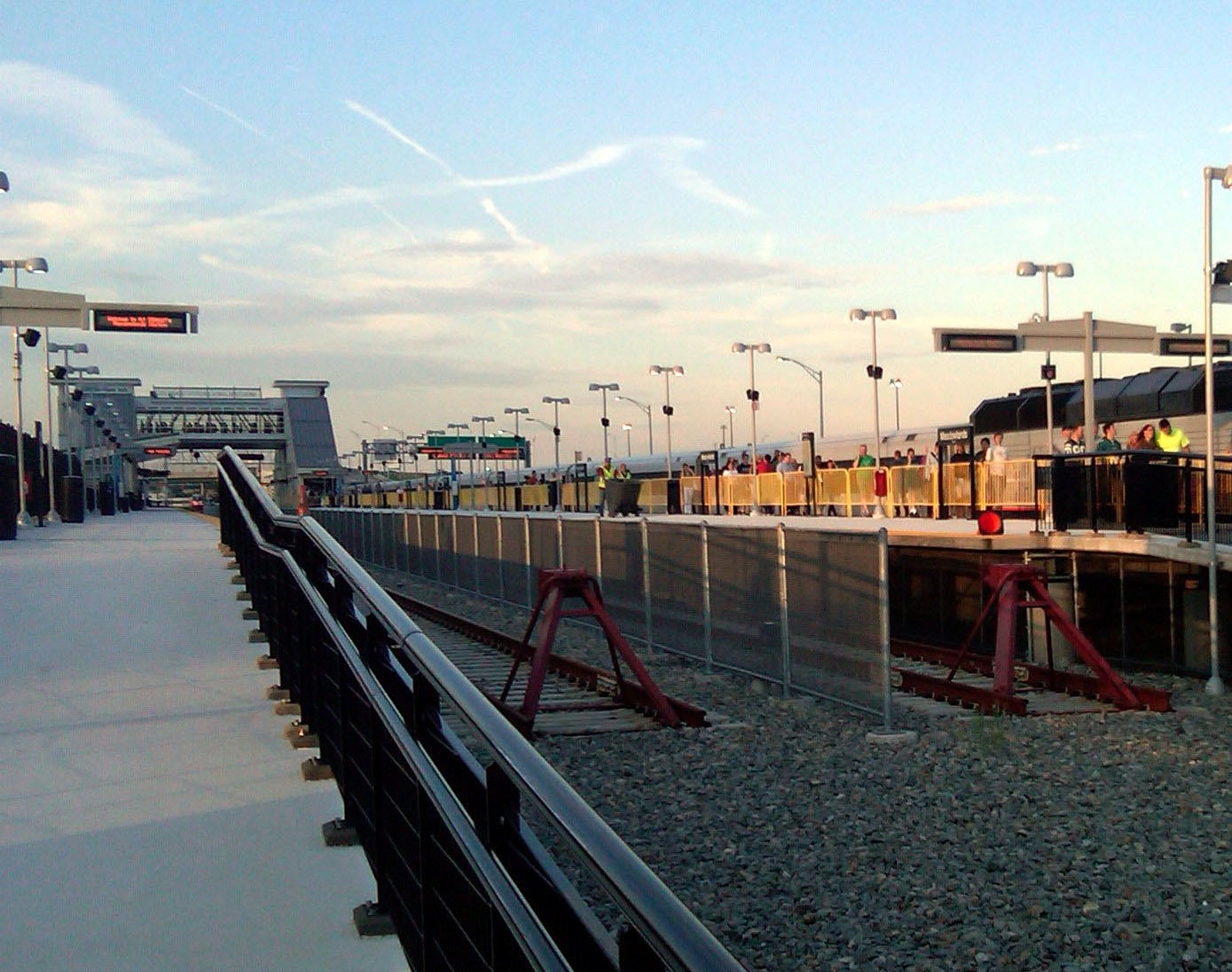
- Meadowlands station platforms

General information
- Other names: Meadowlands Sports Complex
- Location: 50 State Route 120; East Rutherford, New Jersey
- Coordinates: 40°48′46″N 74°04′19″W
- Owner: New Jersey Transit
- Platforms: 1 island platform, 1 side platform
- Tracks: 3

Construction
- Structure type: At-grade
- Accessible: Yes

History
- Opened: July 26, 2009

Passengers
- Q1 FY2013: 195,711

Services
Preceding station	NJ Transit	Following station
Terminus	Meadowlands Rail Line special event service	Secaucus Junction toward Hoboken
Location

Meadowlands station (also known as Meadowlands Sports Complex station) is a New Jersey Transit train station that is the western terminus for the Meadowlands Rail Line located at the Meadowlands Sports Complex in East Rutherford, New Jersey.

The station is situated equidistant between Meadowlands Racetrack, Meadowlands Arena, American Dream and MetLife Stadium to which there is a direct aerial connection. There is one island platform and one side platform each approximately 950 feet (290 m) in length and have an enclosed passenger overpass, which provides an accessible connection.

NJ Transit operates the Doordash Meadowlands Rail Line to the station for stadium events when 50,000 or more attendees are expected. Despite the opening of American Dream in 2019, the station is not yet operating daily. NJ Transit says daily service may begin "once the rail system is resilient enough that doing so won’t adversely affect NJ Transit commuters".

On September 14, 2022, NJ Transit entered into a naming rights agreement with BetMGM, a sports betting company owned by MGM Resorts International, to rename the rail line for $3 million over the next 3 years. In September 2025, the contract expired, and, after once again operating with no sponsor, and minimal "décor", the line's logo was changed in 2026 to reference that year's FIFA World Cup. In June 2026, the line was renamed to the "Doordash Meadowlands Rail Line" through June 2027, as part of a new partnership with Doordash.

== History ==
The Meadowlands station opened on July 20, 2009, when a group of dignitaries including New Jersey Governor Jon Corzine, New York Giants owner John Mara, New York Jets owner Woody Johnson, and players from the Giants and Jets rode out on a special train from Hoboken for a ribbon-cutting ceremony. The station officially opened to the public on July 26, 2009, for the championship game of the CONCACAF Gold Cup tournament between the United States and Mexico. As many as 6,000 of the 80,000 attendees at the soccer game arrived at the complex using the station.

In August 2009, New Jersey assemblymen Frederick Scalera and Gary Schaer advocated using the train station as a park and ride facility with weekday rush-hour service to help alleviate traffic congestion on the roadways leading to New York City, but the New Jersey Sports and Exposition Authority indicated this could create conflicts on evenings when other events were scheduled, such as those at the Izod Center.

Although the new train service worked well for the first two regular season NFL games—when approximately 6,000-7,000 football fans arrived by rail—the line's first major problems occurred on September 23, 2009, when 20,000 attendees at a U2 concert crammed onto trains in both directions. Some concertgoers had to wait up to two hours to board trains after the show, as the rail line can only accommodate an overall maximum capacity of almost 10,000 people per hour.

The station operated during all games during the aforementioned FIFA World Cup hosted at MetLife Stadium, with the first of those, June 13, featuring Brazil and Morocco, said to have brought 21,578 fans to the stadium via the rail line and shuttle buses. Similar to Super Bowl XLVIII in 2014, which was dubbed as the Mass Transit Super Bowl, FIFA did not allow parking at MetLife Stadium for the World Cup, requiring most attendees to use public transportation services. NJ Transit had originally planned to accommodate 40,000 riders per match at the World Cup, but subsequent changes included the implementation of shuttle bus routes to Manhattan and a park-and-ride lot in Nutley and the provision of 4,700 parking spaces at the American Dream.
