= Harrison station (NJ Transit) =

NJ Transit station in Harrison, New Jersey

Coordinates: 40°44′42.2″N 74°9′38.0″W

Harrison

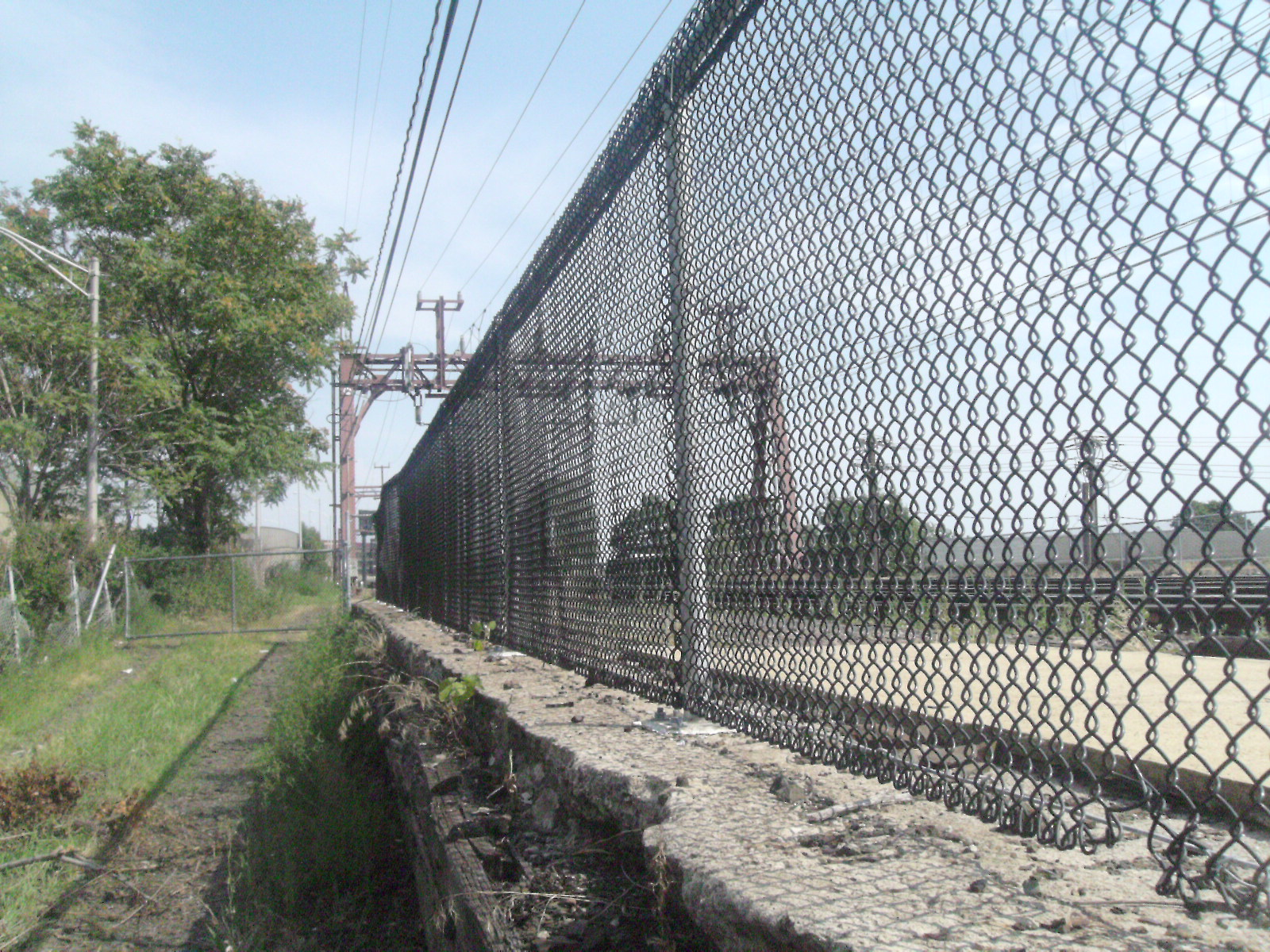
- The site of Harrison station in 2010.

General information
- Location: South 2nd Street between Jersey Street and Warren Street, Harrison, New Jersey
- Owner: New Jersey Transit

History
- Closed: September 16, 1984
- Rebuilt: 1904
- Electrified: September 3, 1930

Former services
Preceding station	NJ Transit	Following station
Newark Broad Street toward Gladstone	Gladstone Branch	Hoboken Terminus
Newark Broad Street toward Hackettstown	Morristown Line	Hoboken Terminus
Newark Broad Street toward Bay Street	Montclair Branch	Hoboken Terminus
Preceding station	Delaware, Lackawanna and Western Railroad	Following station
Newark toward Montclair	Montclair Branch	Hoboken Terminus
Location

Harrison was a station on New Jersey Transit's Morris & Essex Lines (consisting of the Montclair Branch, Morristown Line and Gladstone Branch) in Harrison, New Jersey, United States. The station was built by the Delaware, Lackawanna and Western Railroad in 1906. It was situated between Newark Broad Street Station and Hoboken Terminal.

The station remained in service during most of the 20th century, until New Jersey Transit closed the station on September 16, 1984 with Roseville Avenue in Newark. The station was demolished shortly afterwards.

== See also ==
- Harrison station (PATH)
