= George Warrington =

American businessman (1952–2007)

- Born: September 19, 1952; Bayonne, New Jersey, U.S.
- Died: December 24, 2007 (aged 55); Mendham, New Jersey, U.S.
- Occupation: Transportation official
- Known for: President of Amtrak

George David Warrington (September 19, 1952 – December 24, 2007) was an American transportation official, who served New Jersey Transit for 28 years, latterly in the post of executive director.

He grew up in Ridgefield Park, New Jersey and graduated from Ridgefield Park High School as part of the class of 1970.

== Career ==
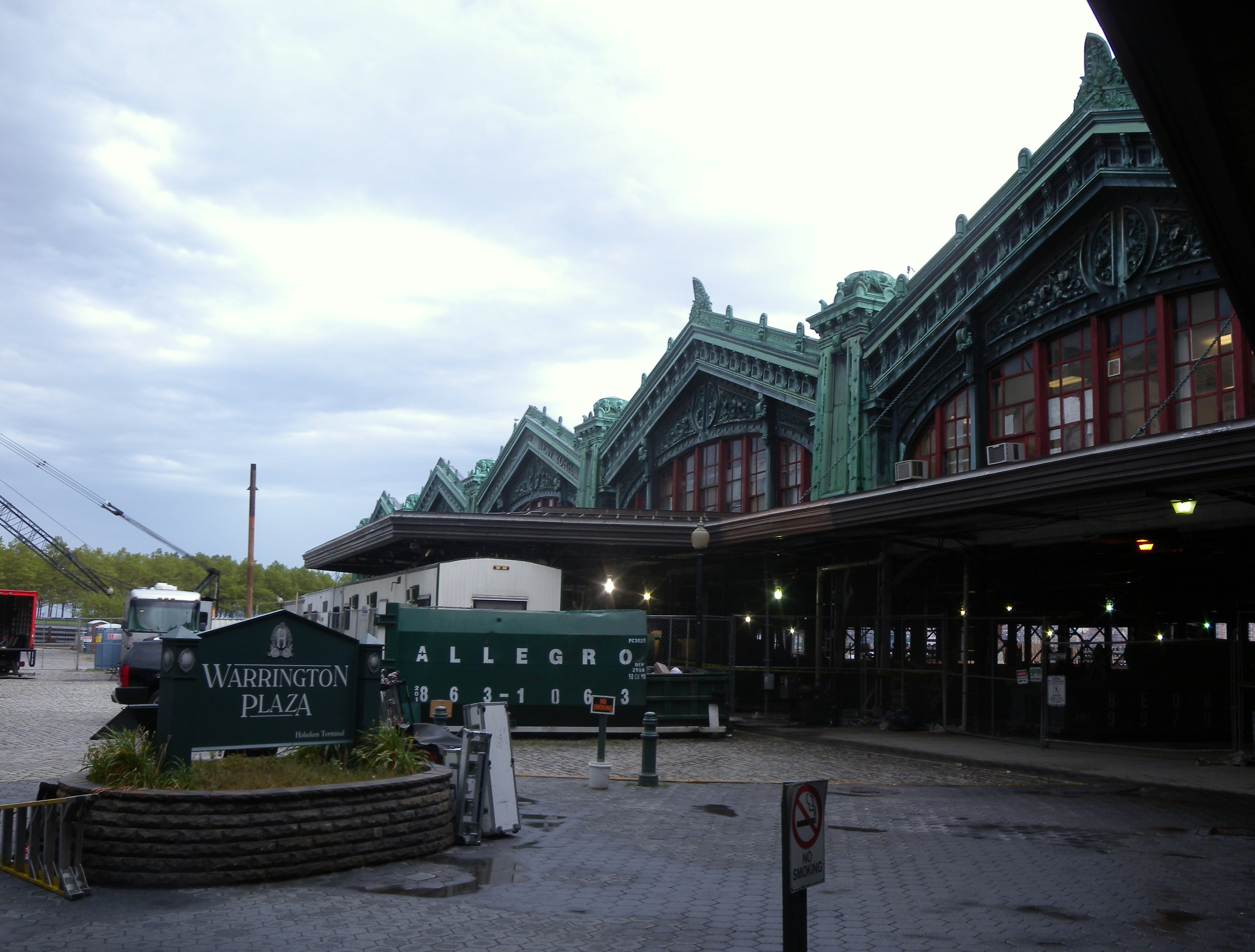
Warrington Plaza next to the Hoboken Terminal

Warrington served with New Jersey Transit, joining the agency on its creation in 1979, rising to the post of vice president and general manager of New Jersey Transit rail operations. From 1990 to 1992, he served as Deputy Commissioner of the New Jersey Department of Transportation. He served as Executive Director and President of the Delaware River Port Authority and Port Authority Transit Corporation from 1992 to 1994. He then served as President of Amtrak's Northeast Corridor Business Unit from 1994 to 1998. From 1998 to 2002, he served as President of Amtrak. From 2002 to March 2007, he served as executive director of New Jersey Transit. He left and with two partners, co-founded a strategic consulting and lobbying firm, Warrington Fox Shuffler in New York City (later renamed Fox and Shuffler). He was a staunch supporter, and early advocate of the Access to the Region's Core (ARC) tunnel and promoted park-and-ride, as well as the expansion of New Jersey Transit's passenger capacity.

== Death ==
Warrington died on December 24, 2007, after an eight-month battle with pancreatic cancer. NJ Transit and the city of Hoboken dedicated a plaza at the Hoboken Terminal to Warrington in spring 2008.

== See also ==
- James Weinstein
- William Crosbie

Business positions
Preceded by Thomas M. Downs	President of Amtrak; 1998 – 2002	Succeeded by David L. Gunn
