= William Crosbie (engineer) =

Canadian engineer and transportation planner

- Born: William Crosbie; Canada
- Education: Queen's University (B.Sc. Hons.); Naval Postgraduate School (M.S.)
- Engineering career
- Discipline: Electrical engineering, transportation engineering, railway infrastructure
- Practice name: SYSTRA USA (CEO); Parsons Railroad Programs (VP); Kiewit Infrastructure Co.
- Projects: Northeast Corridor operations management Washington Metro security assessments Long Bridge North Package alternative delivery Susquehanna River Rail Bridge Replacement
- Significant design: Canadian Pacific rail signaling & communication systems

William Crosbie is a Canadian engineer and transportation planner.

== Background ==
Crosbie holds an honors bachelor's degree in electrical engineering from Queen's University in Kingston, Ontario, and a master's degree in security studies (homeland security and defense) from the Naval Postgraduate School in Monterey, California.

== Career ==
Crosbie began his career with the Canadian Pacific Railway, where he worked for six years, designing and commissioning railway signal and communication systems in Canada and the United States. He began working at Amtrak in 2002, was interim president in 2008, and became chief operating officer until the position was eliminated in 2010. He then worked for Parsons Corporation and thereafter as CEO for SYSTRA. He was appointed Executive Director of New Jersey Transit in April 2016, but ultimately did not take up the position.

== See also ==
- George Warrington
- James Weinstein
