= Meadowlands Rail Line =

Rail line in New Jersey

DoorDash Meadowlands Rail Line
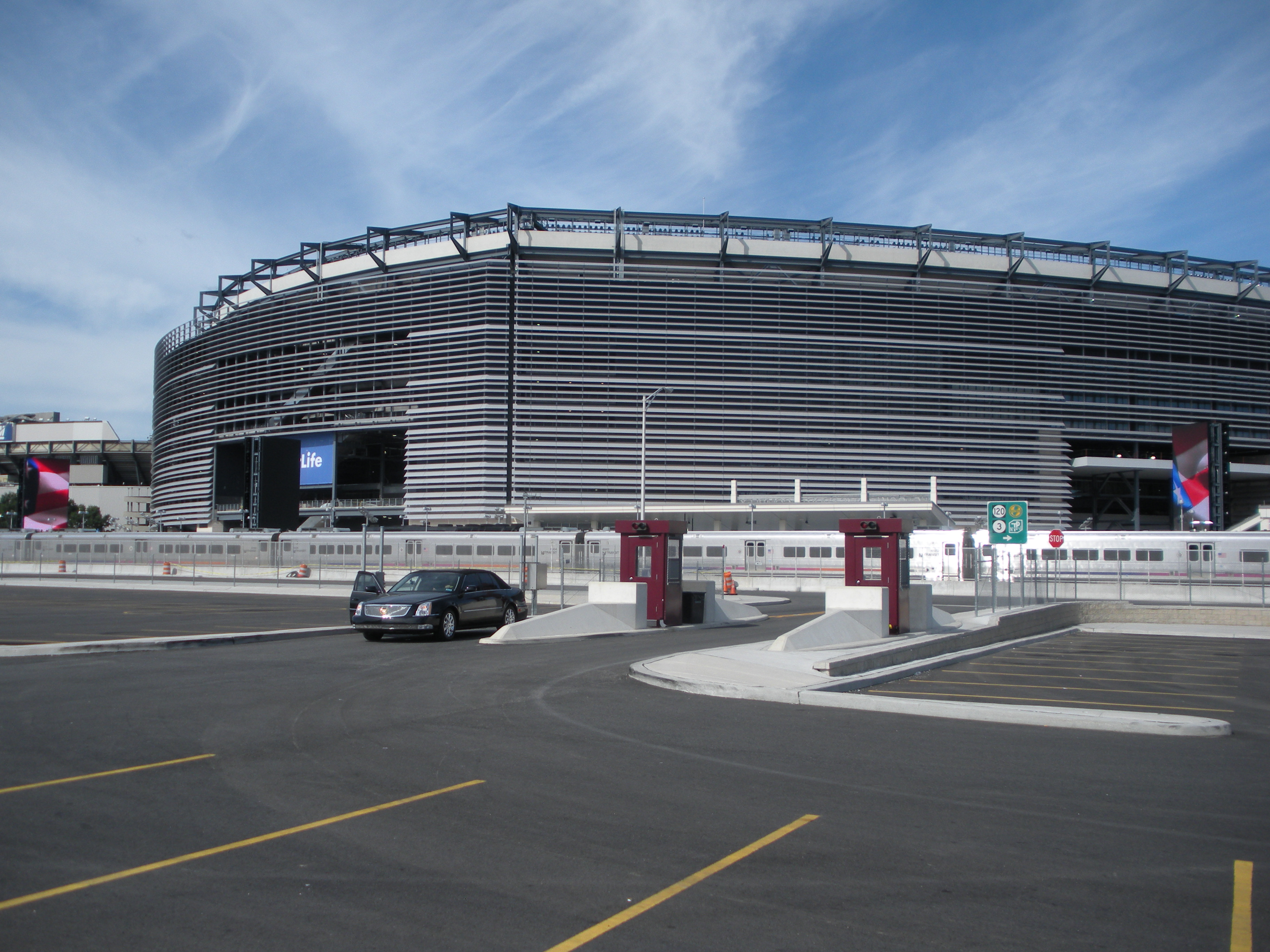
- Station (foreground) at MetLife Stadium

Overview
- Owner: NJ Transit
- Locale: North Jersey
- Termini: Hoboken Terminal; Meadowlands
- Stations: 3

Service
- Type: Event shuttle
- System: New Jersey Transit Rail Operations

History
- Opened: July 20, 2009; 17 years ago

Technical
- Line length: 9.9 mi (15.9 km)
- Num of tracks: 2
- Track gauge: 4 ft 8 1/2 in (1,435 mm) standard gauge

The Meadowlands Rail Line, branded DoorDash Meadowlands Rail Line in June 2026, is a rail line in New Jersey, United States, operated by NJ Transit Rail Operations (NJT). Trains run between the Meadowlands Sports Complex and Secaucus Junction, some with continuing service to Hoboken Terminal. There is limited service on the line, with trains only operating in conjunction with major stadium events. Train service on the line is supplemented by bus service using Secaucus-Meadowlands Transitway.

The publicly funded rail line was built at a cost of $185 million. Upon opening on July 20, 2009, it became the newest NJ Transit rail route. It is represented on NJT maps with the color gold and uses no NJT logo. The previous naming rights agreement used the logo of BetMGM; the current one uses that of Doordash.

Meadowlands station was built as a part of the rail network expansion and is next to MetLife Stadium, equidistant from Meadowlands Racetrack, Meadowlands Arena and American Dream.

== Service ==
NJ Transit runs trains along the line for events where 50,000 or more attendees are expected, including New York Jets and New York Giants games. Trains begin running 3 1/2 hours before an event and stop up to two hours after its conclusion. Travel time between Meadowlands Station and Secaucus Junction is 10 to 13 minutes; a trip to or from Hoboken Terminal takes about 23 minutes. The agency considers full capacity to be 10,000 passengers per hour.

In anticipation of increased ridership for Super Bowl XLVIII in February 2014, NJT extended platforms at Secaucus Junction by 120 ft (37 m) to accommodate multi-level 10-car train sets which can handle about 1,400 to 1,800 passengers per trip, moving about 14,000 or 15,000 people an hour. Secaucus Junction is a major interchange station for NJ Transit where all but one of its commuter lines stop. Connections are available to the Northeast Corridor Line and the North Jersey Coast Line to New York Penn Station and Newark Penn Station and points south; the Morris and Essex Lines Midtown Direct and limited service on the Raritan Valley Line to New York Penn Station and points west; the Main Line, the Bergen County Line, and the Pascack Valley Line to points north. At its eastern terminus Hoboken Terminal connections to PATH trains, Hudson Bergen Light Rail, New York Waterway ferries and local buses are available.

The Train to the Game was an excursion train operated jointly by Metro-North Railroad and NJ Transit, for Sunday football games starting at 1 pm. Trains running as part of this service originate at New Haven. They travel through southwestern Connecticut and Westchester County, Hell Gate Bridge, cross Manhattan via New York Penn (thus avoiding the normally required transfer from Grand Central Terminal), and continue through the North River Tunnels as regular NJT trains to Secaucus Junction. When the service first began, three trains operated in each direction. However, this was reduced to one train in each direction starting with the 2010 football season.

New Jersey Transit began introducing online ticketing services by offering round-trip tickets from New York Penn Station to MetLife Stadium during the 2012 NFL season.

Despite officials indicating the line would begin daily service when the American Dream complex opened, which occurred in 2019, the Meadowlands Rail Line does not currently operate daily, with NJ Transit delaying the expansion of service until "the rail system is resilient enough that doing so won’t adversely affect NJ Transit commuters".

== History ==
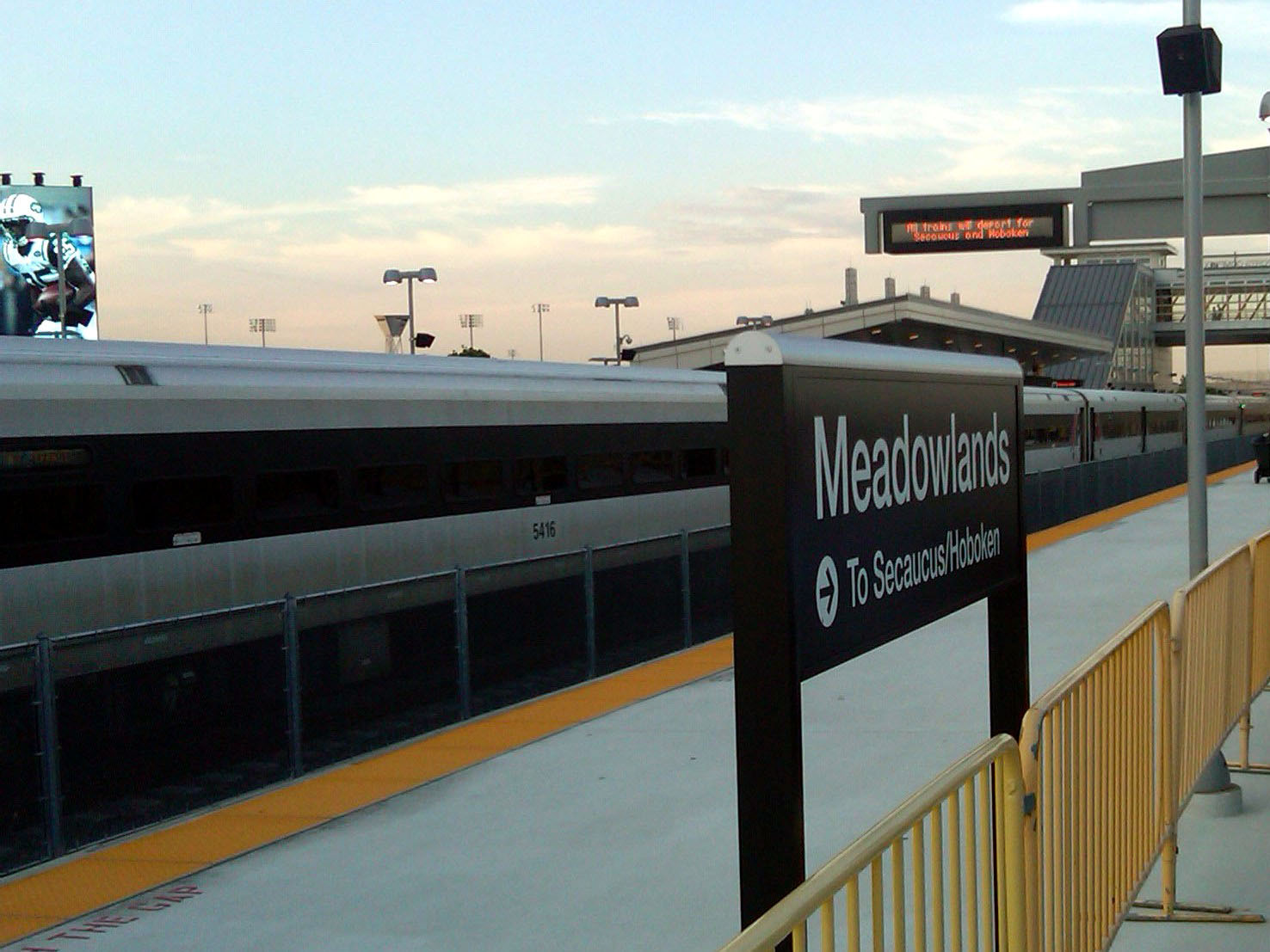
The rail line provides service to Secaucus Junction and Hoboken Terminal

The Meadowlands Sports Complex, which opened in 1976, was until 2009 accessible only via automobile or bus. The decision to build a rail line along the chosen route was a source of controversy. A portion of the line is a 2.3-mile-long (3.7 km) spur line connected via a new wye connection to the existing network. The line as built is a spur off the Pascack Valley Line, which travels further than if it had branched directly off the Bergen County Line. The decision to spend $6.2 million to acquire a right-of-way that travels through a federal Superfund site was also contentious.

Constructed at a cost of $185 million in taxpayer funding, the opening ceremonies for the line took place on July 20, 2009. New Jersey Governor Jon Corzine, New York Giants owner John Mara, New York Jets owner Woody Johnson, and players from the Giants and Jets rode a special train from Hoboken to the new station for a ribbon-cutting ceremony. The station opened to the public on July 26, 2009, for the championship game of the CONCACAF Gold Cup tournament between the United States and Mexico. It is estimated that 6,000 arrived via the new rail line.

Ridership to National Football League games increased by 50 percent in the rail line's second year of operation. In 2010, about 10,500 attendees at New York Jets games and 8,000 attendees at New York Giants games arrived by train.

In an operation dubbed the Mass Transit Super Bowl for Super Bowl XLVIII on February 2, 2014, record numbers of riders took the shuttle to Meadowlands before the game, and were faced with waits of up to 90 minutes, due to security delays. After the game ended, there were more delays, as demand exceeded the Meadowlands station's regular operating capacity. At one point, fans were asked to remain inside the stadium until more trains were dispatched to load passengers from the station. In total 28,301 riders arrived at the stadium, and 35,264 left via train, nearly three times as many riders as NJ Transit predicted.

WrestleMania 35 in April 2019 was attended by 82,265 people, many of whom took the train. Due to scheduling delays, passengers had long waits before the first trains departed after the event, leading to claims of incompetence on the part of NJ Transit, which had not adhered to its own schedule. NJ Transit officials claimed the 12:30 a.m. event ending caused the problem, since some train engineers had reached the end of the federal limit on work hours.

In anticipation of overflow crowds attending BTS performances in May 2019, NJ Transit advised departing concertgoers to find alternative transportation, and planned additional bus service, saying that the line's capacity of 8,000 person per hour would be exceeded.

On September 14, 2022, NJ Transit entered into a naming rights agreement with BetMGM, a sports betting company owned by MGM Resorts International, to rename the line for $3 million over the subsequent three years. During this time, the line was branded the BetMGM Meadowlands Rail Line, and used the BetMGM logo.

For the 2026 FIFA World Cup, MetLife Stadium is being called New York/New Jersey Stadium. In May 2026, NJ Transit announced that round-trip tickets would be $150 to cover costs. That controversial price was later reduced to $105 after sponsorship and other funds were identified. They were further reduced to $98.

In June 2026, the line was branded the "Doordash Meadowlands Rail Line", as part of a new partnership with Doordash until June 2027, with an option to extend the contract.

== Stations ==
Station	Miles (km)	Date opened	Connections / notes
Hoboken Terminal (limited service)	0.0 (0.0)	1903	Bergen County, Gladstone, Main, Montclair–Boonton, Morristown, North Jersey Coast, Pascack Valley,Port Jervis Line lines Hudson-Bergen Light Rail: Hoboken-8th Street, Hoboken-Tonnelle; PATH: HOB-WTC, HOB-33, JSQ-33 (via HOB); NJ Transit Bus: 22, 22X, 23, 68, 85, 87, 89, 126; New York Waterway
Secaucus Junction	3.5 (5.6)	2003	Bergen County, Gladstone, Main, Montclair–Boonton, Morristown, North Jersey Coast, Northeast Corridor, Raritan Valley lines, Pascack Valley, Port Jervis Line; NJ Transit Bus: 2, 78, 129, 329, 353
Meadowlands Sports Complex	9.9 (15.9)	2009	NJ Transit Bus: 351, 353, 703, 772

== Alternative transit ==
In 2021, NJ Transit authorized studies for alternative bus options between the Meadowlands Sports Complex and Secaucus Junction dubbed the Secaucus-Meadowlands Transitway. Largely using existing infrastructure, it is planned to go into service for the 2026 FIFA World Cup.

In January 2022, the New Jersey Department of Transportation announced the replacement of the eastbound Route 3 Bridge over the Hackensack River, which would incorporate provisions for a potential future expansion of the Hudson-Bergen Light Rail, ostensibly from Secaucus Junction.
