= MassTransit-Project =

.NET software to route messages over several service buses

MassTransit
- Developer(s): Chris Patterson ("phatboyg"), Dru Sellers ("drusellers")
- Stable release: 8.1.2 / Nov 14, 2023
- Repository: github.com/MassTransit/MassTransit
- Written in: C#, .NET
- Operating system: Windows, Linux, MacOS
- Type: Enterprise Service Bus (ESB)
- License: Apache 2.0
- Website: masstransit.io

MassTransit is free software/open-source .NET-based Enterprise Service Bus (ESB) software that helps .NET developers route messages over RabbitMQ, Azure Service Bus, SQS, and ActiveMQ service busses. It supports multicast, versioning, encryption, sagas, retries, transactions, distributed systems and other features. It uses a "Control Bus" design to coordinate and the Rete algorithm to route. Since it does not include "business monitoring" or a "business rules engine" (and requires programming to implement sagas for orchestration), MassTransit is typically considered to be in the category of "lightweight ESB" software.

The project is led by Microsoft MVP and national conference speaker Chris Patterson ("phatboyg"), who is also the author of the TopShelf project, and is co-authored by Dru Sellers. By February 2021 downloads of the package through NuGet passed 26,000 per week.

MassTransit is similar to a commercial offering called NServiceBus, and developers often pick one or the other for their implementation. The similarity is no accident, as the authors note that MassTransit was first built in 2007 as an alternative to NServiceBus, and the projects share the use of some code. Other similar "NuGet" ESB packages include Rebus and Rhino Service Bus.

== Transition to Commercial Model ==
In April 2025, the MassTransit project announced that they are transitioning to a commercial licensing model.
