= James Weinstein (New Jersey official) =

James Weinstein is an American transportation planner and executive. In 2010, New Jersey Governor Chris Christie appointed him executive director of New Jersey Transit, the state agency for New Jersey which provides bus, light rail, and commuter rail. He served in that position until March 2014. He is on the advisory board of Rutgers University's Voorhees Transportation Center and the Board of Trustees for the North Jersey Transportation Planning Authority.

Weinstein holds a Bachelor of Arts degree in philosophy from Seton Hall University.

Weinstein had previously served as New Jersey Commissioner of Transportation and chairman of the NJ Transit board of directors from 1998 to 2002. Weinstein has been senior vice president of AECOM, a global transportation consulting and engineering firm, since 2002. Prior to joining the firm, he was senior vice president of Amtrak's Northeast Corridor. Weinstein formerly served as a vice chairman and member of the board of directors of the American Road and Transportation Builders Association. He has also served on the boards of the Port Authority of New York and New Jersey, the Delaware River Port Authority and New Jersey's toll agencies.

Weinstein's tenure at NJ Transit has been called "rocky' by The New York Times; it was characterized by major fare increases, the damage of equipment due to insufficient precautions in face of Hurricane Sandy, and overcrowding during what had been marketed as the Mass Transit Super Bowl. In February 2014 he announced his resignation, effective March 2; his successor was Veronique Hakim. Numerous other staff have also left the agency since Weinstein's resignation.

A lifelong resident of New Jersey, he resides in Moorestown with his wife.

== See also ==
- George Warrington
- Governorship of Chris Christie
- William Crosbie (engineer)
