= Hoboken Terminal =

Commuter station in Hoboken, New Jersey

Hoboken
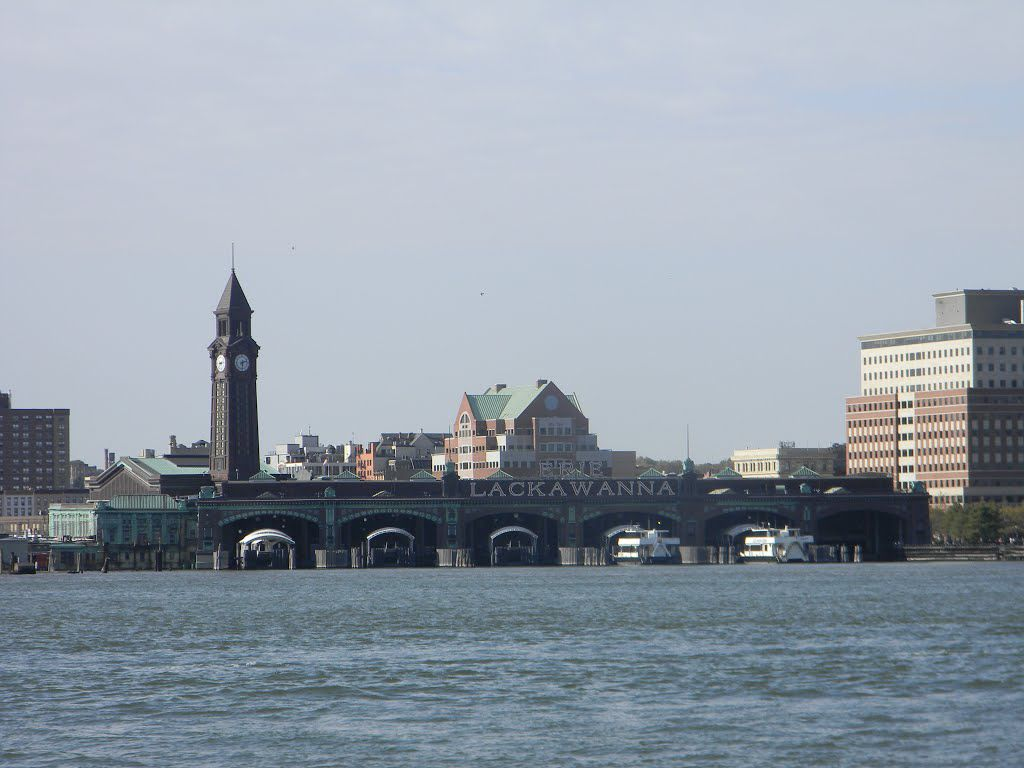
- Hoboken Terminal from the Hudson River in 2012

General information
- Location: 1 Hudson Place; Hoboken, New Jersey; United States
- Owner: New Jersey Transit (street level); Port Authority of New York and New Jersey (underground)
- Lines: NJT Hoboken Division; PATH Uptown Hudson Tubes; PATH Downtown Hudson Tubes
- Platforms: 9 island platforms, 1 side platform
- Tracks: 18
- Connections: NY Waterway; NJ Transit Bus: 22, 23, 63, 64, 68, 85, 87, 89, 126

Construction
- Platform levels: 2
- Cycle facilities: 88 spaces
- Accessible: yes

Other information
- Station code: Commuter rail: HOB; NJT Bus: 20496, 20497; Light rail: 30829
- Fare zone: 1

History
- Opened: February 25, 1907
- Electrified: September 3, 1930

Passengers
NJ Transit Rail Operations
- 2025: 7,790 (average weekday)
- Rank: 3 of 153
Hudson-Bergen Light Rail
- 2025: 3,751 (average weekday)
- Rank: 3 of 24
PATH
- 2025: 4,989,034 ▼7.6%
- Rank: 6 of 13

Services
Preceding station	NJ Transit	Following station
NJ Transit Rail Operations
Newark Broad Street toward Hackettstown	Montclair–Boonton Line	Terminus
Newark Broad Street toward Hackettstown	Morristown Line weekdays	Terminus
Newark Broad Street toward Gladstone	Gladstone Branch weekdays	Terminus
Secaucus Junction toward Suffern	Main Line	Terminus
Secaucus Junction toward Suffern	Bergen County Line	Terminus
Secaucus Junction toward Spring Valley	Pascack Valley Line	Terminus
Secaucus Junction toward Meadowlands	Meadowlands Rail Line special event service	Terminus
Hudson–Bergen Light Rail
Terminus	Hoboken–Tonnelle	2nd Street toward Tonnelle Avenue
Newport toward 8th Street	Bayonne–Hoboken	Terminus
Newport toward 8th Street	Bayonne Flyer	Terminus
Preceding station	Metro-North Railroad	Following station
Secaucus Junction toward Port Jervis	Port Jervis Line	Terminus
Preceding station	PATH	Following station
Terminus	HOB–WTC	Newport toward World Trade Center
Terminus	HOB–33	Christopher Street toward 33rd Street
Newport toward Journal Square	JSQ–33 (via HOB) Late-nights	Christopher Street toward 33rd Street
Former services
Preceding station	NJ Transit	Following station
Arlington toward Hackettstown	Boonton Line until 2002	Terminus
Newark Broad Street toward Bay Street	Montclair Branch until 2002	Terminus
Harrison toward Bay Street	Montclair Branch until 1984	Terminus
Newark Penn toward Bay Head	North Jersey Coast Line limited service until 2020	Terminus
Preceding station	Delaware, Lackawanna and Western Railroad	Following station
Newark toward Buffalo	Main Line	Terminus
Harrison toward Montclair	Montclair Branch	Terminus
Newark toward Gladstone	Gladstone Branch	Terminus
Kingsland toward Dover	Boonton Branch	Terminus
Future services
Preceding station	NJ Transit	Following station
Newark Broad Street toward Andover	Lackawanna Cut-Off	Terminus
- Erie-Lackawanna Railroad Terminal at Hoboken
- U.S. National Register of Historic Places
- Interactive map of Erie-Lackawanna Railroad Terminal at Hoboken
- Location: On the Hudson River at the foot of Hudson Place, Hoboken, New Jersey
- Coordinates: 40°44′6″N 74°1′39″W
- Area: 4 acres (2 ha)
- Built: 1907; 119 years ago
- Architect: Kenneth MacKenzie Murchison
- Architectural style: Beaux-Arts neoclassicism
- NRHP reference No.: 73001102
- Added to NRHP: July 24, 1973
Location

Hoboken Terminal is a commuter-oriented intermodal passenger station in Hoboken, Hudson County, New Jersey. One of the New York metropolitan area's major transportation hubs, it is served by eight NJ Transit (NJT) commuter rail lines, an NJ Transit event shuttle to Meadowlands Sports Complex, one Metro-North Railroad line, various NJT buses and private bus lines, the Hudson–Bergen Light Rail, the Port Authority Trans-Hudson (PATH) rapid transit system, and NY Waterway-operated ferries.

More than 50,000 people use the terminal daily, making it the tenth-busiest railroad station in the United States and the sixth-busiest in the New York area. It is also the second-busiest railroad station in New Jersey, behind only Newark Penn Station, and its third-busiest transportation facility, after Newark Liberty International Airport and Newark Penn Station.

The rail and ferry terminal buildings were constructed in 1907 by the Delaware, Lackawanna and Western Railroad, a former Class 1 railroad. In 1930, Thomas Edison was at the controls for the first departure of a regular-service electric multiple-unit train from Hoboken Terminal to Montclair. In 1973, the terminal building was added to the New Jersey Register of Historic Places and the National Register of Historic Places.

Hoboken Terminal is considered a milestone in American transportation development, initially combining rail, ferry, subway, streetcar, and pedestrian services. Later, bus and light-rail services were added to the terminals. Another feature of the terminal's design is the terminal's 225-foot (69 m) clock tower. The tower was replaced by a radio tower that stood for more than half a century, until being removed in June 2006, when it was replaced with a new clock tower modeled after the original.

== History ==
=== 19th century ===
The site of the terminal had been used since colonial times to link Manhattan Island and points west. In 1811, the first steam-powered ferries began called Hoboken Ferryboats service under John Stevens, an inventor who founded Hoboken. In 1889, due to several complaints through The New York Times, changes were made to the service such as bigger boats for passengers, and more trips.

The coming of the railroads brought more and more travelers to the west bank of the Hudson River. Cuts and tunnels were constructed through Bergen Hill to rail–ferry terminals on the west bank of the river and the Upper New York Bay. The first terminal opened on November 14, 1862 by the Morris and Essex Railroad; trains reached the terminal via the Long Dock Tunnel operating under an agreement with the Erie Railroad. This facility quickly became overcrowded so it was quickly reconstructed; the second terminal opened on January 15, 1868. This facility burnt down in June 1873 and a temporary terminal was hurriedly constructed within the year.

The first of the Bergen Tunnels under Jersey City Heights was opened in 1877 by the Morris and Essex Railroad, which was leased by the Delaware, Lackawanna and Western Railroad (DL&W).

The temporary terminal was finally replaced by a more permanent facility; the fourth terminal on the site opened in 1885.

=== 20th century ===
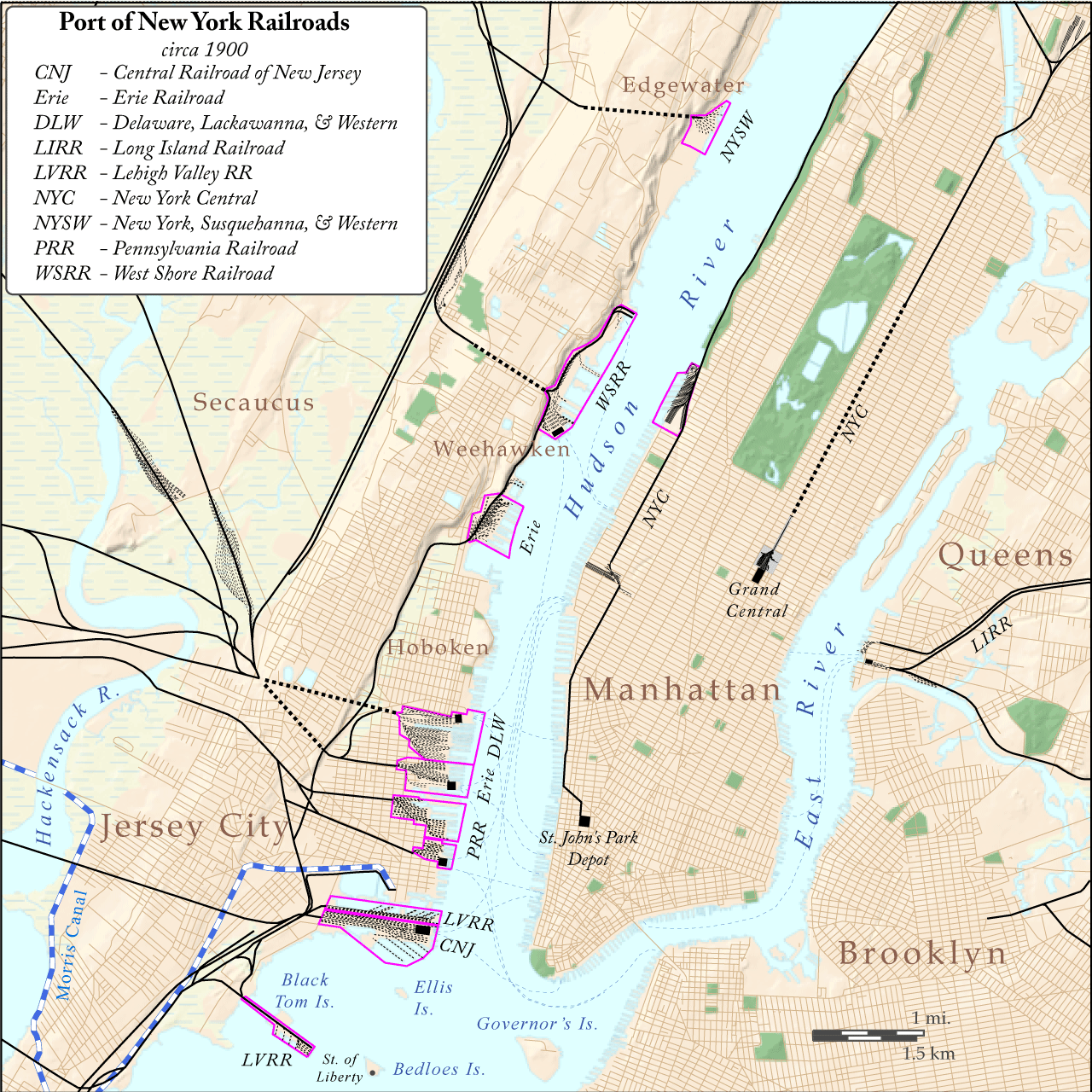
Map of the five train-to-ferry transfer points along the west shore of the Hudson River circa 1900

The facility that was in the place of the Hoboken Terminal caught fire and burned down in 1905 after the Hopatcong, a ferry docked at the terminal, caught fire at midnight, which spread to the original facility. The Delaware, Lackawanna and Western Railroad decided to build another large terminal since they had more than enough funds. The new facility was planned by William Truesdale, who worked to modernize the DL&W railroad. The rail and ferry terminal buildings were constructed in 1907 by the Delaware, Lackawanna and Western Railroad.

The following year, the railroad opened the second parallel tunnel. Both tunnels are still used by NJ Transit. The tubes of the Hudson and Manhattan Railroad, forerunner of PATH, were extended to Hoboken Terminal upon its opening. The first revenue train on the new line ran from the terminal on February 26, 1908.

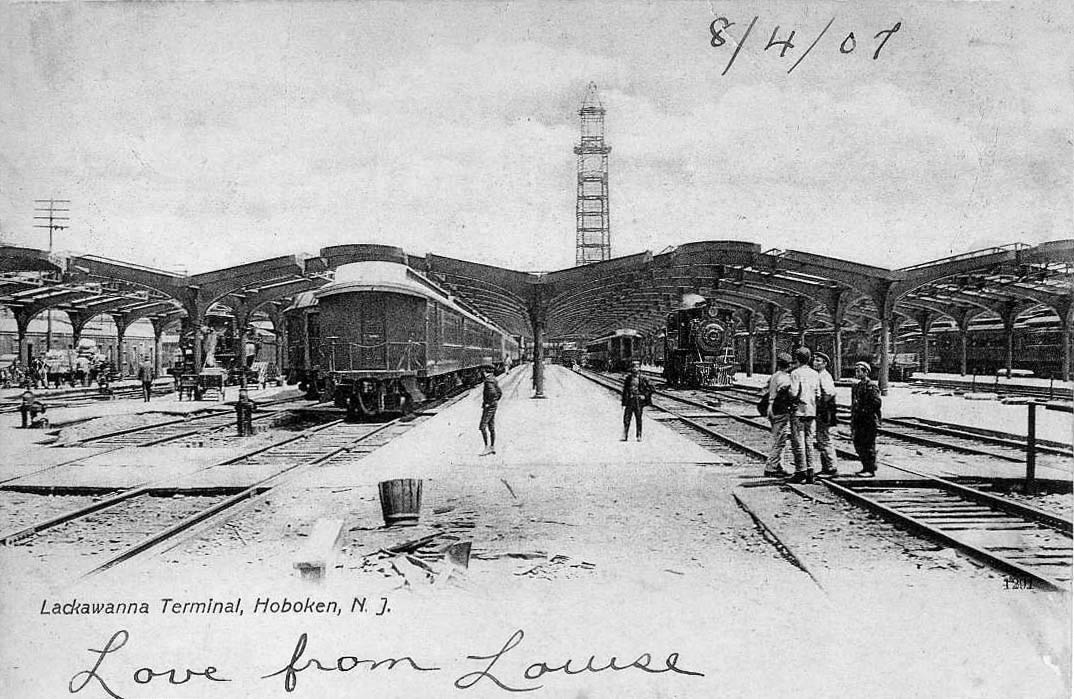
Hoboken Terminal under construction, 1907

In 1914, George A. Cullen, the Passenger Traffic Manager for the Delaware, Lackawanna and Western Railroad, stated that Hoboken Terminal handled more than 17 million railroad passengers and 18 million additional ferry passengers.

In 1919, the train shed was raised using jacks as it had experienced irregular settlement in the 13 years it had been in service.

In 1930, Thomas Edison was at the controls for the first departure of a regular-service electric multiple unit train from Hoboken Terminal to Montclair. One of the first installations of central air-conditioning in a public space was at the station, as was the first non-experimental use of mobile phones.

In 1942, the clock tower of the terminal was removed to reclaim the copper to use in World War II. After the war, Hoboken suffered another blow when automobile and air travel rose to prominence at the expense of the railroads. Amtrak started operating in 1971, and by then intercity services by the then merged Erie and DL&W railroads stopped operating out of Hoboken. The final train between Hoboken and Chicago departed the night of January 5, 1970, and arrived on January 6 in Chicago's Dearborn Station.

Despite the difficulties of the railroad industry, which culminated in bankruptcy for many railroads through the 1970s, the terminal has always been an essential link for New York-bound commuters, which saved it from the threat of demolition. The popular disapproval of the razing of the nearby Pennsylvania Station in 1963, (and its replacement by Madison Square Garden and a new Penn Station below ground level) may have also helped Hoboken Terminal's survival.

Numerous streetcar lines (eventually owned and operated by the Public Service Railway), including the Hoboken Inclined Cable Railway, originated and terminated at the station until bustitution was completed on August 7, 1949.

At the peak of intercity rail service, five passenger terminals were operated by competing railroad companies along the Hudson Waterfront. Of the five, Hoboken Terminal is the only one still in active use. Those at Weehawken (New York Central), Pavonia (Erie Railroad), and Exchange Place (Pennsylvania Railroad) were demolished in the 1960s, while the one in Jersey City (Central Railroad of New Jersey) was partially restored and is now part of Liberty State Park.

In October 1956, four years before its merger with the DL&W to form the Erie Lackawanna Railway, the Erie Railroad began to shift its trains from Pavonia Terminal to Hoboken. The final Erie trains to be moved to Hoboken, in 1959, were from the Northern Branch. In October 1965, on former Erie routes, there were five trains each weekday to Wanaque/Midvale on the Greenwood Lake branch, three to Nyack on the Northern Branch, three to Waldwick via the Newark Branch, two to Essex Fells on its Caldwell Branch, two to Carlton Hill on the former Erie Main Line, and one to Newton on the Sussex Branch. All those trains were dropped in 1966.

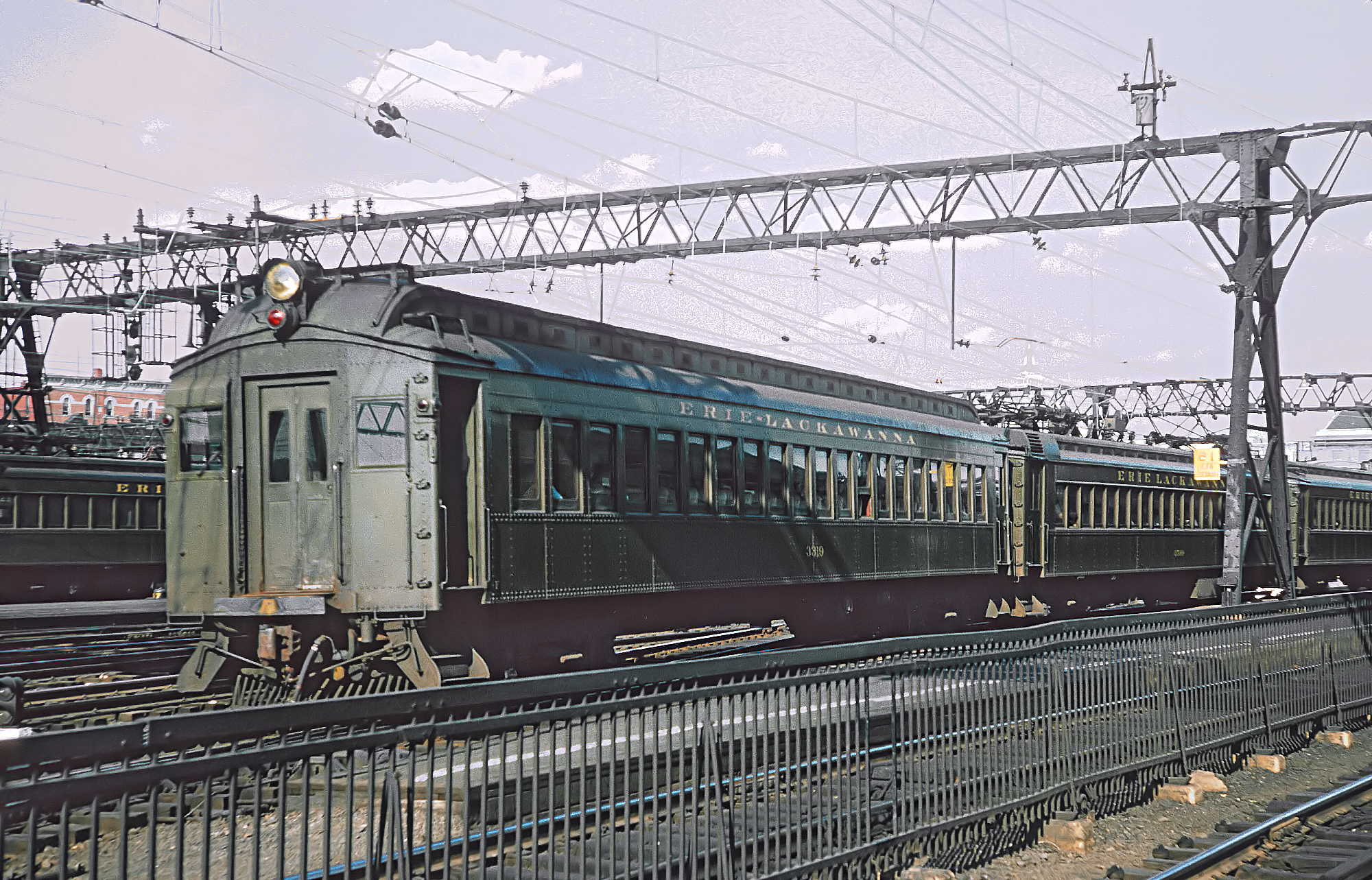
An Erie Lackawanna commuter train arriving at Hoboken in November 1978

Ferry service from the terminal to lower Manhattan ended on November 22, 1967, due to declining ridership and revenues. It resumed in 1989 on the south side of the terminal and moved back to the restored ferry slips inside the historic terminal on December 7, 2011.

In 1973, the terminal building was added to the New Jersey Register of Historic Places and the National Register of Historic Places. The PATH station's platforms were lengthened in 1987 to allow the station to accommodate eight-car trains.

In 1990, the New Jersey Historic Preservation Bond Program gave a grant of $400,000 towards repairs and restoration of the Terminal. In 1991, another grant of $300,000 was given. The money was used towards repairing the ferry terminal's roof and clerestory.

In 1999, the New Jersey Devils' proposed to build an arena atop the Hoboken Terminal, which would be on the Hudson waterfront. The proposal never went through.

=== 21st century ===
On August 14, 2003, amid the Northeast blackout of 2003, PATH and NJ Transit Rail Operations were unable to operate anywhere, including Hoboken Terminal. Commuters from New Jersey used the NY Waterway ferry to Hoboken Terminal as an alternative, and passengers said it was so packed it caused concern. Operations of PATH and NJ Transit trains resumed the morning of August 15 with the use of diesel trains.

Access to the Region's Core (ARC) was a proposed commuter-rail project to add new rail tunnels under the Hudson River, but the plan was canceled in 2010. In 2013, the New Jersey General Assembly passed a resolution supporting the extension of New York City Number 7 subway into Secaucus as a cheaper alternative to the proposed ARC tunnel. The plans never went through despite the idea being revived as possibly being a part of, or along with, the Gateway Project, which also proposes new tunnels, and bridges over the Hudson River.

A renovation that lasted from 2005 to 2009 demolished and rebuilt walls to resemble their original appearance; the terminal's clock tower was rebuilt as well along with the original neon-lit Lackawanna sign.

The station was badly damaged during Hurricane Sandy on October 29, 2012. A 5-foot (1.5 m) storm surge inundated the facility; the water rose as high as 8 feet (2.4 m) in the PATH tunnels. Daytime PATH service to midtown Manhattan was restored on December 19. The waiting room reopened in January 2013, while extensive repairs were still in progress. Pre-Sandy service patterns were gradually restored by March 1, 2013.

As of 2017, the station was the ninth-busiest railway station in North America.

On October 5, 2022, officials broke ground on Hoboken Connect, a projected five-year project to renovate the Terminal and its immediate vicinity. The plans call for erecting a 20-story commercial building at 5 and 23 Hudson Place and a 27-story, 389-unit residential building on Observer Highway. Planned improvements to Warrington Plaza include movable seats and modular structures for public use. The ferry terminal will be renovated to add retail space and bicycle storage on the ground floor, while commercial space on its second floor will be constructed to house either transport functions, or tenants such as markets, eateries, or areas for arts and culture. In March 2024, the NJ Transit board awarded a $211 million contract to Schiavone Construction for the construction of six tracks and three platforms, as well as a $2 million contract to Voestalpine Railway Systems Nortrak for trackwork. NJ Transit and LCOR agreed to a ground lease for the Hoboken Connect site in March 2024, and work began that May.

In October 2024, the PANYNJ announced that the PATH station at Hoboken Terminal would be closed for most of February 2025 so the tracks, platforms, and four staircases could be replaced. The PATH station was closed from February 1 to February 25; the project cost $31 million.

In April 2025, NJ Transit announced that an interim bus terminal would be built to allow rehabilitation of the existing bus terminal. The interim bus terminal commenced operations on August 9, 2025.

In July 2025, the City of Hoboken announced that LCOR would begin significant construction on Warrington Plaza and Hudson Place as part of the ongoing Hoboken Connect Project.

In August 2025, the PANYNJ announced that the PATH station at Hoboken Terminal would shut down for 5 days between August 28 and September 2 for emergency repairs to the interlocking system.

Hudson Place was officially opened to the public on June 16, 2026 with a ribbon cutting ceremony.

=== Accidents ===
- In December 1985, an NJ Transit train crashed into the concrete bumper at Hoboken Terminal, injuring 54. The 1985 crash was said to have been caused by a lubricant that had been applied to the tracks to test train wheels.
- In May 2011, a PATH train crashed into a bumper block at Hoboken Terminal, injuring 34 people; the Port Authority said the train came in too fast.
- On the morning of September 29, 2016, an NJ Transit train crashed through a stopblock and into the concourse of the station, killing one person and injuring more than 110 people. Tracks 10 through 17 were reopened on October 10, 2016, with most remaining tracks reopened a week later. The pedestrian concourse reopened on May 14, 2017. Track 6 reopened for service in June 2017 and Track 5 reopened for service sometime around September 2018. The planning for permanent repairs to the concourse roof and supports were ongoing during this time. Permanent repairs and renovations began in March 2019 and were completed by the end of 2019.
- On July 12, 2025, a PATH train derailed at the interlocking. The Port Authority said that the likely cause of the derailment was a guard rail on the then recently installed interlocking.
- On August 10, 2025, a man was electrocuted on the PATH platforms after attempting to retrieve a cell phone that had fallen on the track.

== Design ==
Hoboken Terminal is considered a milestone in American transportation development, initially combining rail, ferry, subway, streetcar, and pedestrian services, in one of the most innovatively designed and engineered structures in the nation, with bus and light-rail service added in the ensuing decades. The terminal was also one of the first stations in the world to employ the Bush-type train shed, designed by and named for Lincoln Bush of the DL&W, which quickly became ubiquitous in station design. The terminal building was designed by architect Kenneth M. Murchison in the Beaux-Arts style. The structure is made of concrete, copper, stone, steel, and wrought iron. The complex has 14 tracks for NJ Transit trains, which are located entirely above the water. Track 1 was significantly shortened in the 1960s for a new entrance to the PATH station.

The station is unusual for a New York City area commuter railroad terminal in that it still has low-level platforms, requiring passengers to use stairs on the train to board and alight. The Long Slip Fill and Rail Enhancement project is anticipated to add three high-level accessible-accessible platforms to the south side of the terminal. The project will modify the Long Slip, which is a 2,000-foot (610 m) former barge canal adjacent to the Hoboken Terminal Yard. This is to eliminate it as a conduit for flood water.

The terminal's 225-foot (69 m) clock tower was designed by architect Kenneth Murchison and originally built with the terminal. Its copper cladding was intended to provide a dramatic decorative effect. By the post-World War II period, this patina had been lost to wind erosion and was removed in about 1950 following a storm. The tower was replaced by a radio tower that stood for more than half a century, until being removed in June 2006, when it was replaced with a new clock tower modeled after the original, down to the same copper cladding, albeit with a more modern steel and aluminum infrastructure. The second tower includes a clock with 12-foot (3.7 m) diameter faces and 4-foot-high (1.2 m) copper letters, which spell out "LACKAWANNA", whose fiber optic technology allows them to be lit from dusk to midnight.

The large main waiting room features floral and Greek Revival motifs in tiled stained glass by Louis Comfort Tiffany set atop bands of pale cement. The terminal exterior extends to over four stories and has a copper-clad façade with ornate detailing. It is said the copper used for it is leftover from the Statue of Liberty. Its single-story base is constructed of rusticated Indiana limestone. A grand double stair with decorative cast-iron railings within the main waiting room provides an entrance to the upper-level ferry concourse.

Hoboken Terminal's design

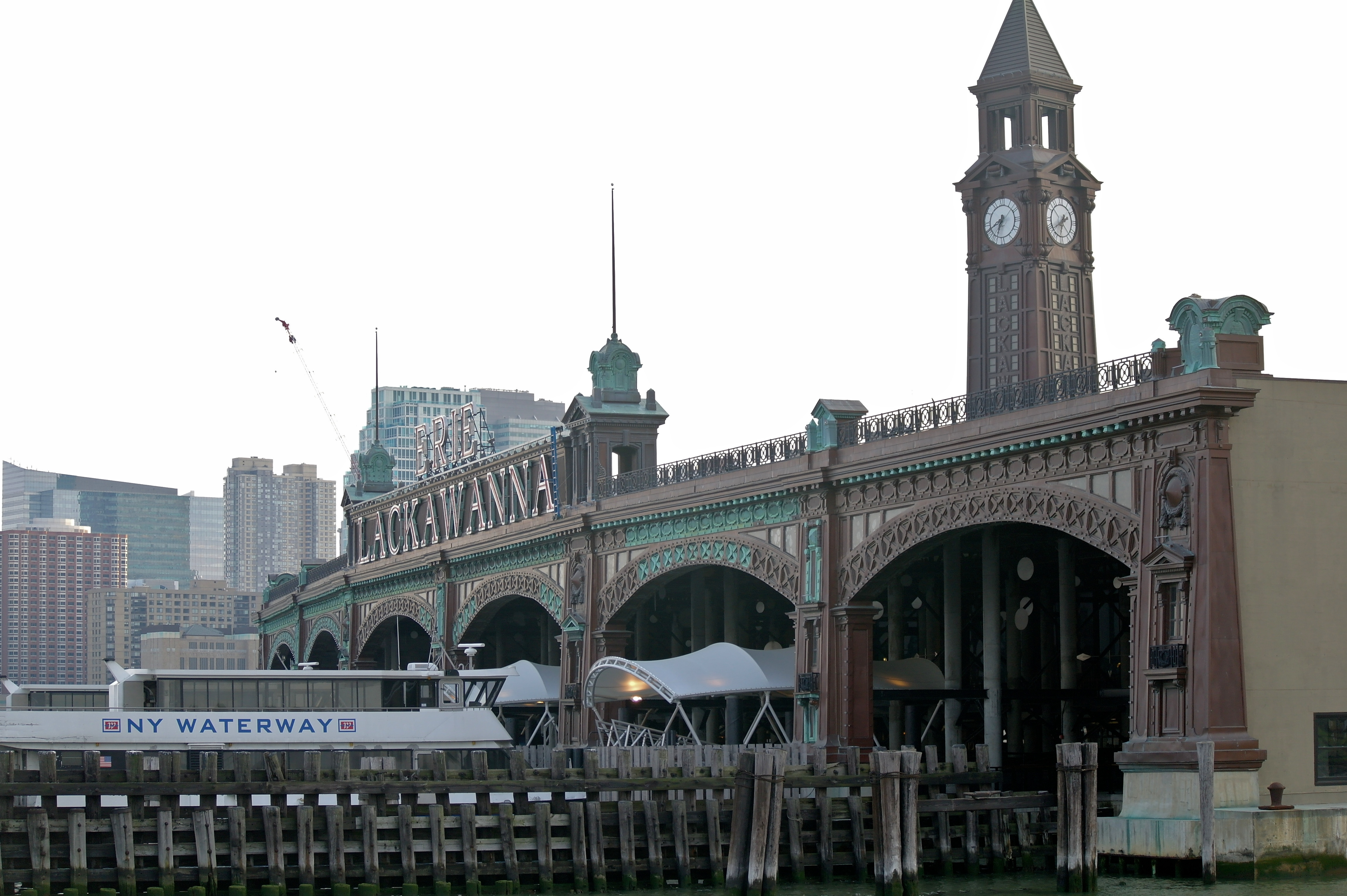
Hoboken Terminal's exterior depicting its neon-lit Lackawanna sign

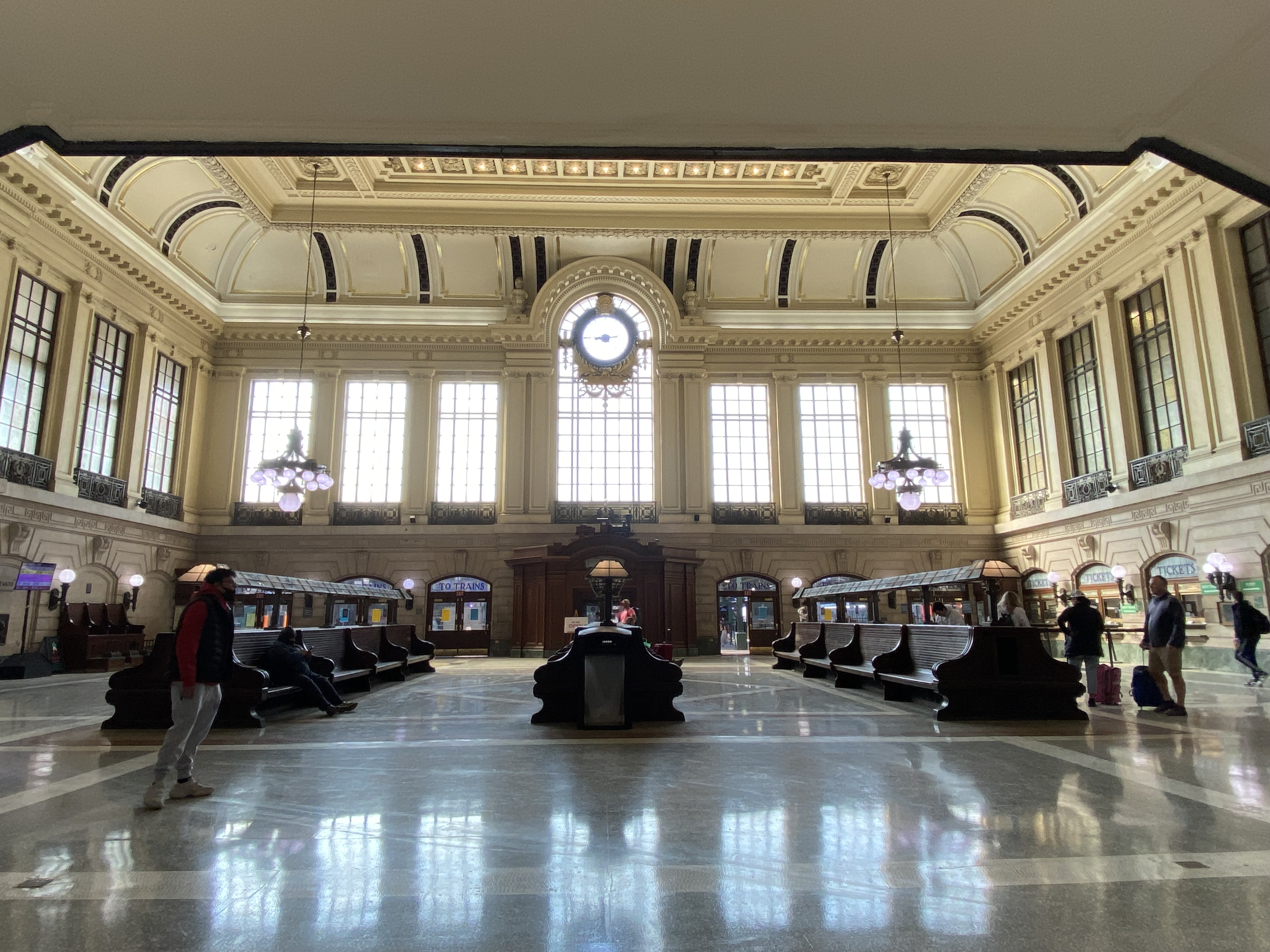
Hoboken Terminal's waiting room

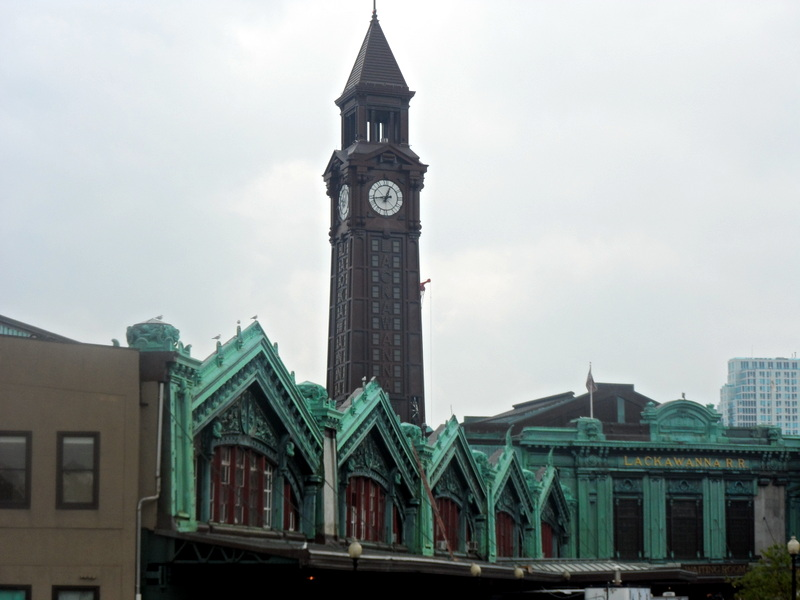
Hoboken Terminal's clock tower

== Services ==
=== Commuter rail ===
Hoboken Terminal is the terminus and namesake for NJ Transit's Hoboken Division, which consists of commuter rail lines in northern New Jersey.

- Bergen County Line
- Main Line
- Meadowlands Rail Line (event service)
- Pascack Valley Line
- Montclair-Boonton Line
- Morristown Line and Gladstone Branch of the Morris and Essex Lines
- Port Jervis Line

Access to other NJ Transit rail lines is available at Newark Penn Station (which also serves Amtrak), Secaucus Junction, or Newark Broad Street.

=== Rapid transit ===
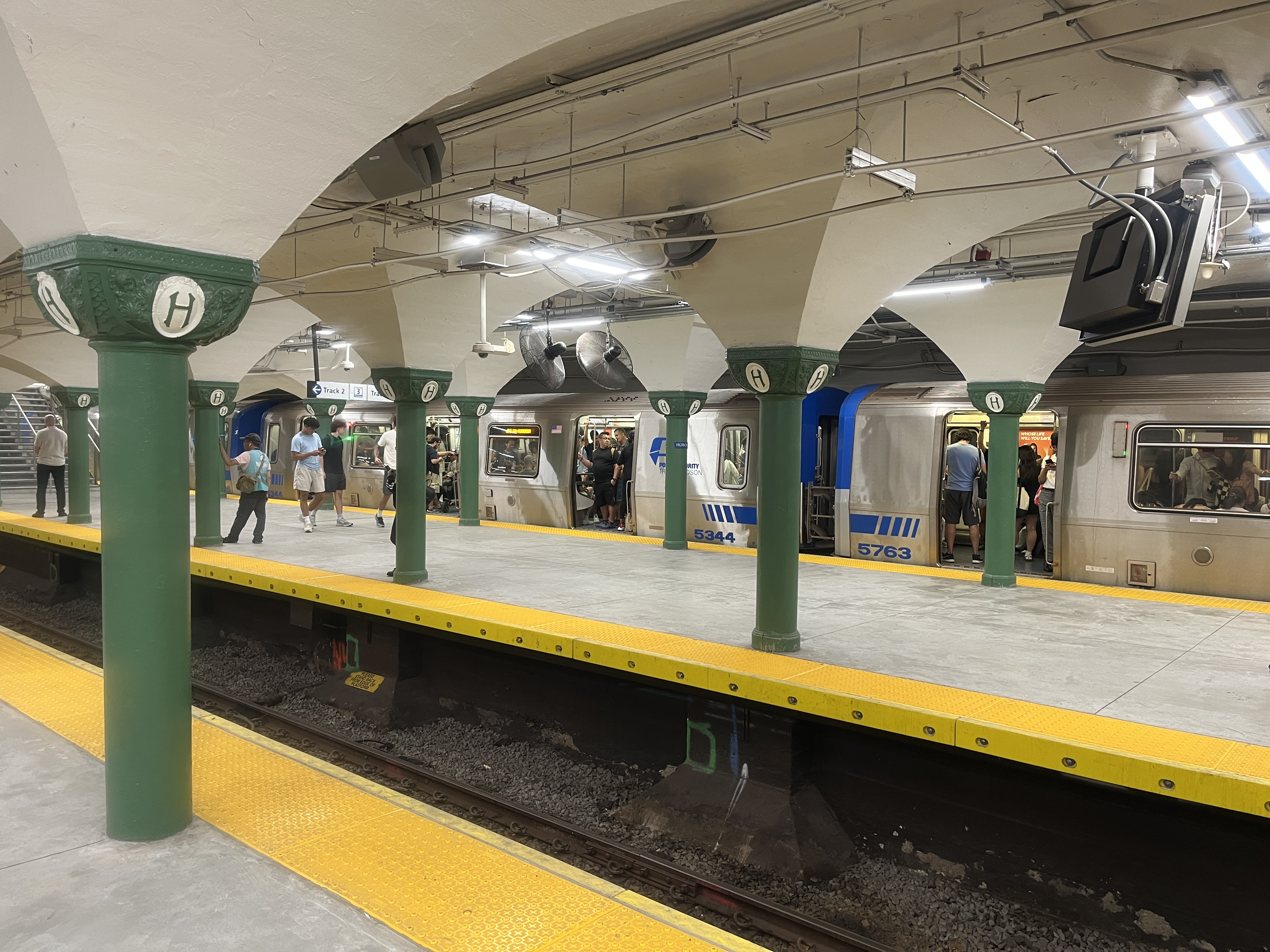
Underground platforms at PATH Hoboken station

PATH trains provide 24-hour service from a three-track underground terminal located north of the surface platforms. The following routes are offered daily between 6 a.m. to 11 p.m. weekdays and 10 a.m. to 9 p.m. weekends:

- Hoboken–World Trade Center, or HOB-WTC
- Hoboken–33rd Street, or HOB-33

Between 11 p.m. to 6 a.m. weekdays and 9 p.m. to 10 a.m. weekends, one route is offered:

- Journal Square–33rd Street (via Hoboken), or JSQ-33 (via HOB)

Entrances are from the main concourse or street, below the Hudson Place bus station with both an elevator and stairs. Traveling to Newark Penn Station always requires a transfer, as does daytime service to Journal Square Transportation Center.

=== Light rail ===
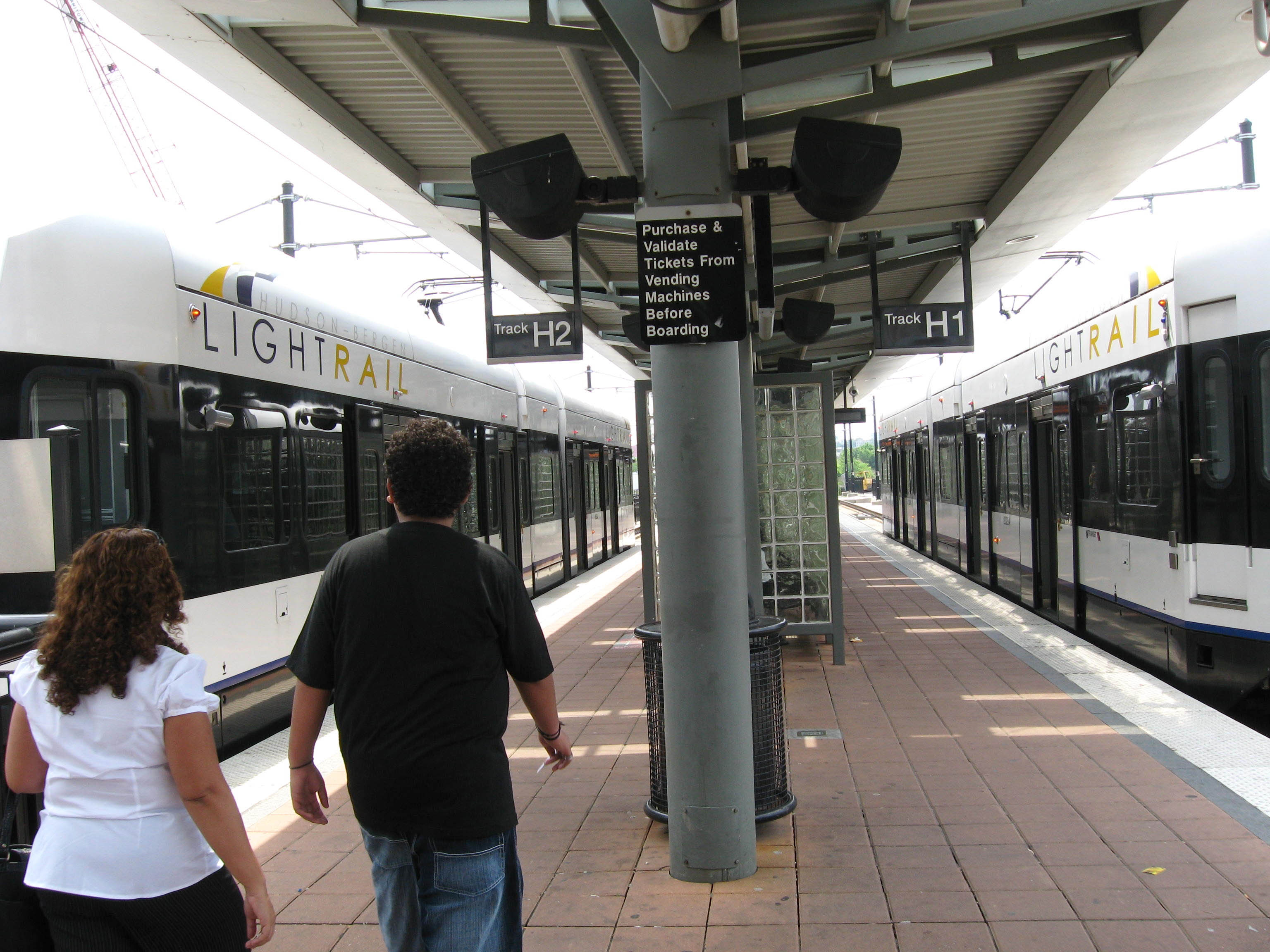
HBLR platform at tracks H1 and H2

Hoboken Terminal is the terminus for two of the three Hudson-Bergen Light Rail routes, which are:

- Hoboken–Tonnelle (weekdays only) between Hoboken Terminal and Tonnelle Avenue
- 8th Street–Hoboken, between 8th Street in Bayonne and Hoboken Terminal

Light rail platforms are located south of Track 18 and the terminal building.

=== Ferry ===
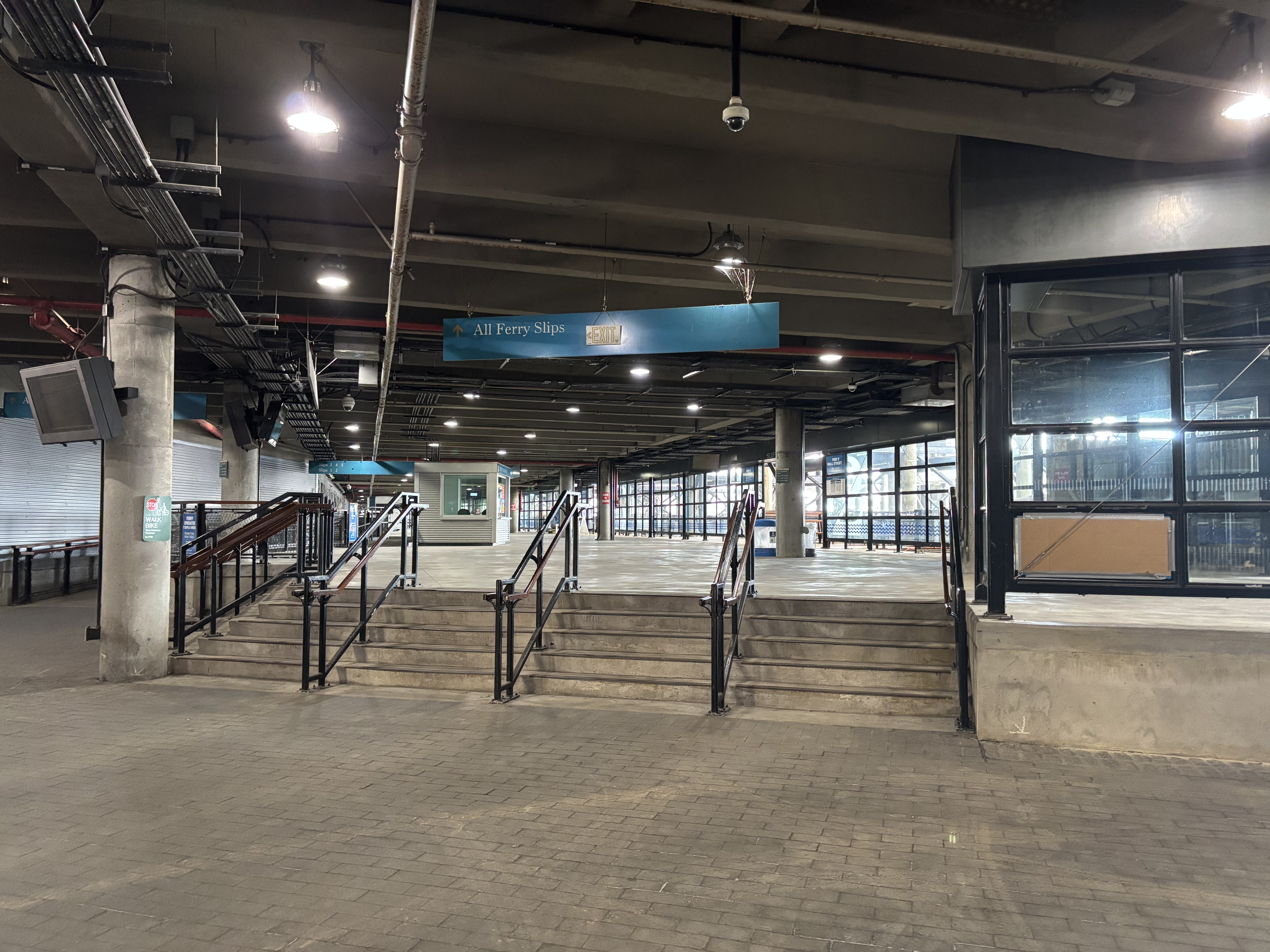
First floor of the ferry building at Hoboken Terminal

Ferry service is operated by NY Waterway to Brookfield Place Terminal daily, as well as Pier 11/Wall Street and West Midtown Ferry Terminal on weekdays. The ferry concourse has five slips, numbered 1–5. Slips 1 and 5 are generally used for ferries heading to West Midtown, Slip 2 is generally used for Wall Street ferries, and Slip 3 is generally used for Brookfield Place ferries.

=== Bus service ===
Ten routes operated by New Jersey Transit Bus Operations serve Hoboken. Buses previously used the covered "Hoboken Bus Terminal"; however, that was shut down for reconstruction and rehabilitation. Operations were transferred to a temporary terminal until operations moved to the current facility on December 8, 2025. The operations are as follows:

Lane	Route	Terminus		Source
1	None (drop off only)	N/A		
2	126	Port Authority Bus Terminal		
3	126	Port Authority Bus Terminal		
4	87	Jersey City		
5	85	American Dream Meadowlands		
6	22, 23, 89	Nungessers		
7	63, 64, 68	Lakewood or Old Bridge	Lincoln Harbor	
8	Closed	N/A		

=== Former named trains ===
Name	Operators	Destination	Year begun	Year discontinued
Atlantic Express and Pacific Express	Erie Railroad, then Erie-Lackawanna	Chicago, Illinois	1885, but started departing from Hoboken in 1956	1965
Chicago Limited	Lackawanna Railroad	DLW terminal in Buffalo, New York, continuing as an express New York Central train to Chicago, the westbound counterpart to the Lackawanna Limited	1917	1941
Erie Limited	Erie Railroad, then Erie-Lackawanna	Chicago, Illinois	Began in 1929, but started departing from Hoboken in 1956	1963
Lake Cities	Erie Railroad, then Erie-Lackawanna	Chicago, Illinois	Began in 1939, but started departing from Hoboken in 1956	1970
Lackawanna Limited	Lackawanna Railroad	Buffalo, until 1941 continuing to Chicago	1901	1949
Merchants Express	Lackawanna Railroad	Scranton	1937	1959
New York Mail	Lackawanna Railroad, then Erie-Lackawanna via Nickel Plate Road	Buffalo, continuing to Chicago	1937	1968
New Yorker/Westerner	Lackawanna Railroad, then Erie-Lackawanna via Nickel Plate Road	Buffalo, continuing to Chicago	1936	1963
Owl	Lackawanna Railroad, then Erie-Lackawanna via Nickel Plate Road	Buffalo, continuing to St. Louis	1919	1968
Phoebe Snow	Lackawanna Railroad, then Erie-Lackawanna	DL&W Terminal, Buffalo	1949	1966
Pocono Express	Lackawanna Railroad	Buffalo	1936	1965
Scrantonian	Lackawanna Railroad	Scranton	1942	1952
Twilight	Lackawanna Railroad	Buffalo	1950	1965

== Environs and access ==
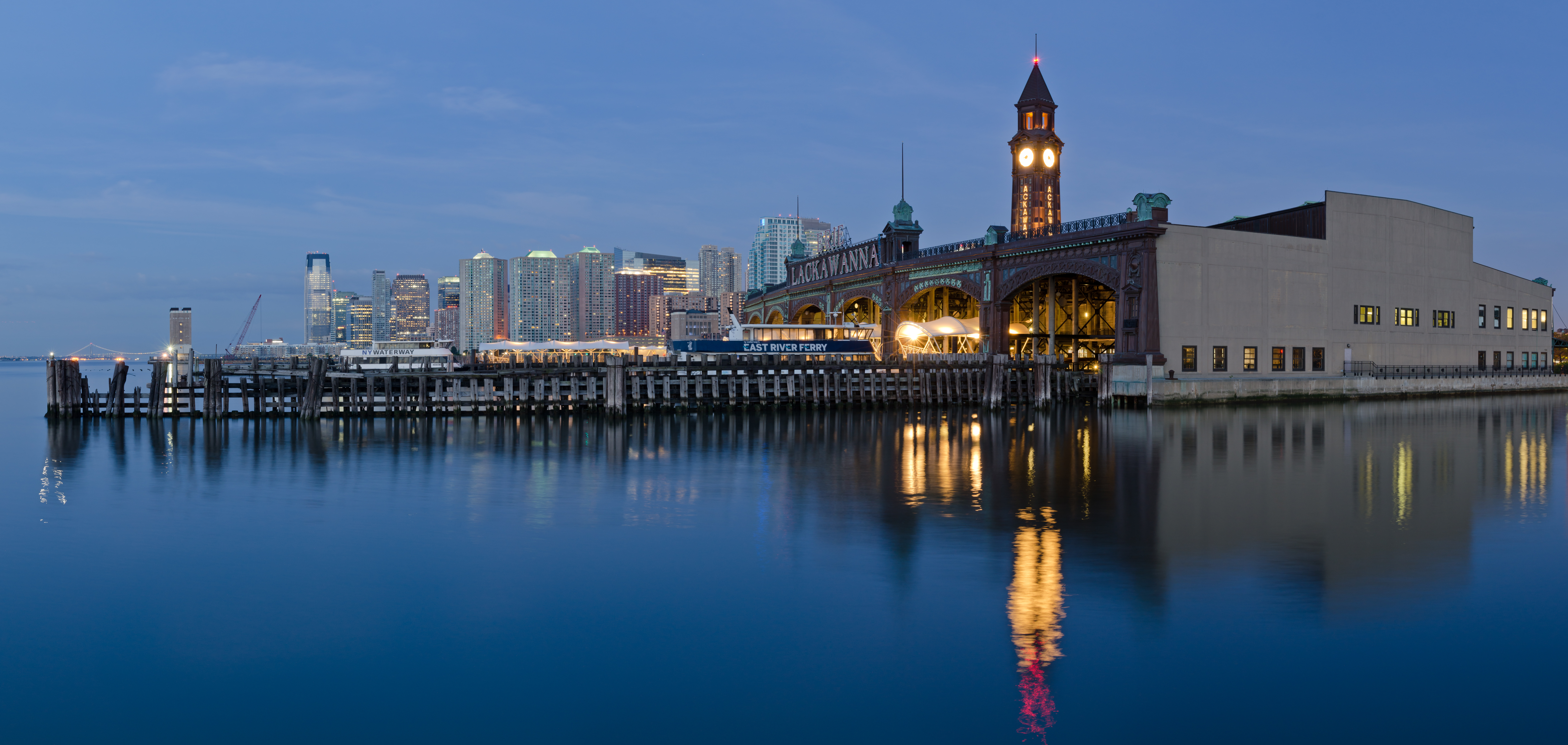
Hoboken Terminal viewed from the northeast, with Jersey City skyline in the background

Though the passenger facilities are located within Hoboken, large parts of the infrastructure that supports them are located in Jersey City. The Hoboken/Jersey City line cuts across the rail yard at a northwest diagonal from the river to the intersection of Grove Street and Newark Street. It is at this corner that Observer Highway begins running parallel to the tracks and creating a de facto border for Hoboken. Motor vehicle access to the station is extremely limited. At the eastern end of Observer Highway, buses are permitted to enter their terminal. Other vehicles are required to do a dog-leg turn onto Hudson Place. This 0.05-mile-long (0.080 km) street (designated CR 736) is the only one with motor vehicle traffic adjacent to the station. In 2009, pedestrian access to the terminal from the south was made possible with the opening of a new segment of the Hudson River Waterfront Walkway.

== In media ==
The station has been used for film shoots, including Funny Girl, Three Days of the Condor, Once Upon a Time in America, The Station Agent, The Curse of the Jade Scorpion, Julie & Julia, Kal Ho Naa Ho, Rod Stewart's "Downtown Train" video (1990) and Eric Clapton's video for his 1996 single "Change the World".
