= Route 3 Bridge (Hackensack River) =

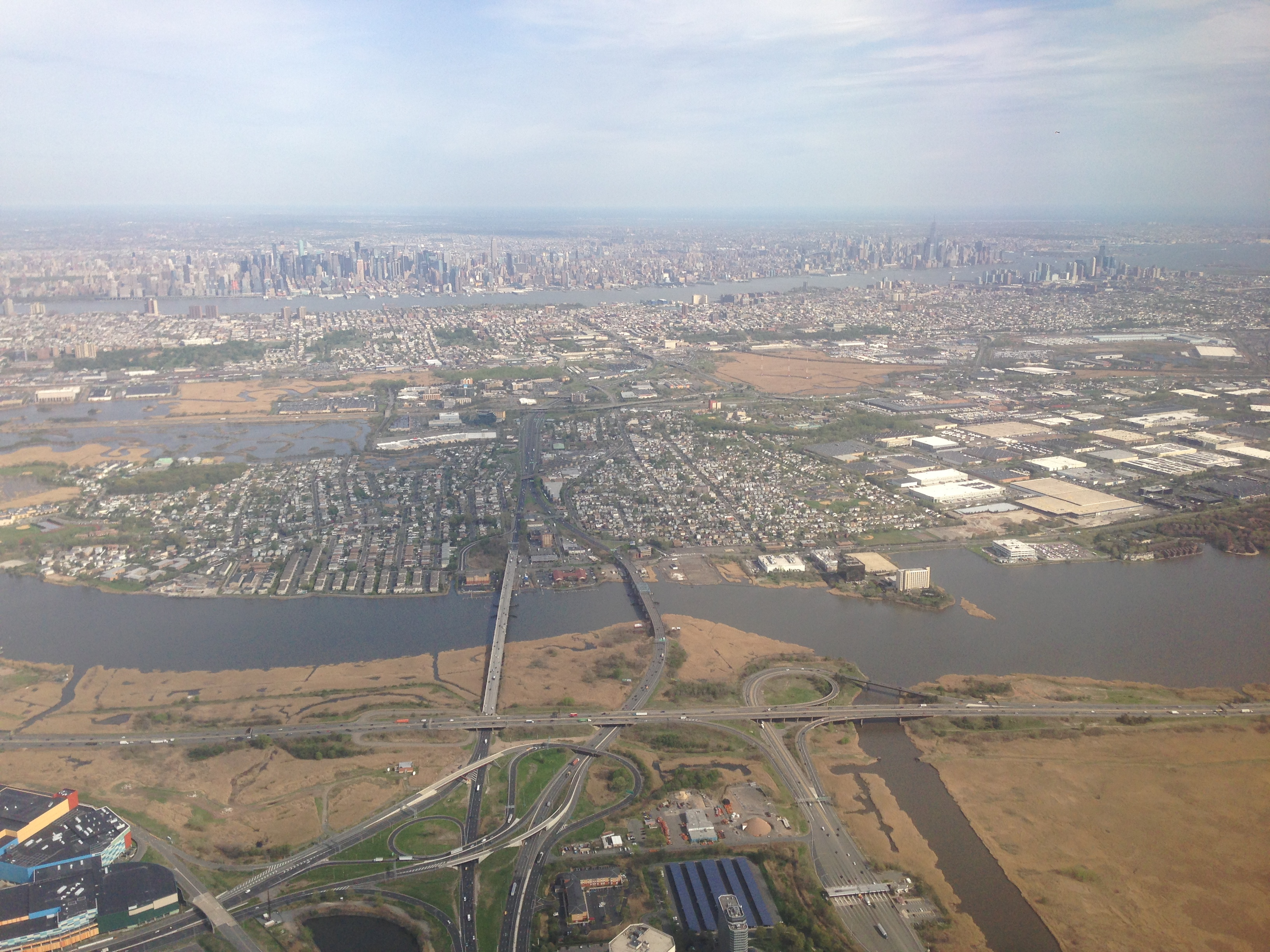
Route 3 over the Hackensack

Route 3 Bridge refers to a pair of vehicular bridges over the Hackensack River in Secaucus and East Rutherford, New Jersey. Located in the immediate vicinity of the Meadowlands Sports Complex at milepost 8.50 of New Jersey Route 3, the downstream bridge carries eastbound traffic while the upstream bridge carries westbound traffic. The bridges are often congested, due in part to the distance from other crossings of the river.

== Route 3 east ==
Route 3 (eastbound)
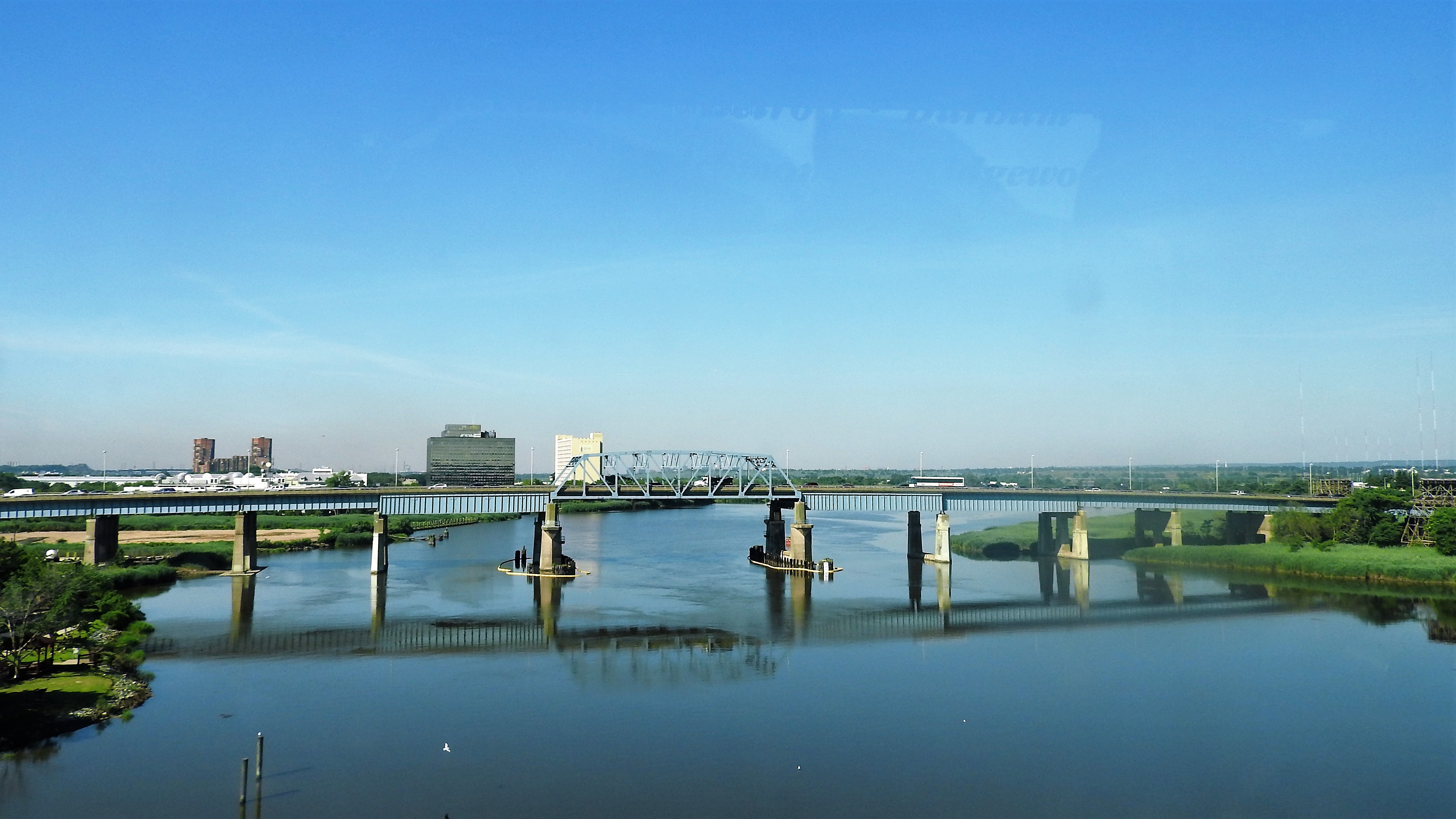
- Coordinates: 40°47′59″N 74°04′03″W
- Carries: New Jersey Route 3
- Crosses: Hackensack River
- Locale: Secuacus and East Rutherford
- Owner: New Jersey Department of Transportation
- Maintained by: NJDOT
- ID number: 0204151

Characteristics
- Design: Pratt Truss
- Material: Concrete and steel
- Total length: 1,552.2 feet (473.1 m)
- Width: 60 feet (18 m) (deck)
- Height: 17.2 feet (5.2 m)
- Longest span: 185 feet (56 m)
- No. of spans: 14

History
- Opened: 1934

The bridge (NJ ID number 0204152) is camelback through truss with a total length of 1,552.2 feet (473.1 m) and a deck width of 60 feet (18 m). It is 7.7 mies from the river's mouth. It was built circa 1934 as a bascule bridge, raised with a fixed span in 1964, and rehabilitated in 2011.

The bridge, using National Bridge Inventory standards, is 'structurally deficient' and is slated to be replaced. In 2022, state transportation commissioner Diane Gutierrez-Scaccetti described the then-88-year-old bridge as being "in the worst condition of any in the state." Funding for the $143 million new span is in part funded by the Infrastructure Investment and Jobs Act. The project will incorporate provision for a potential future expansion of the Hudson-Bergen Light Rail, ostensibly between Secaucus Junction rail hub and the Meadowlands Sports Complex. Announced in January 2022, construction is projected to begin in 2024.

== Route 3 west ==
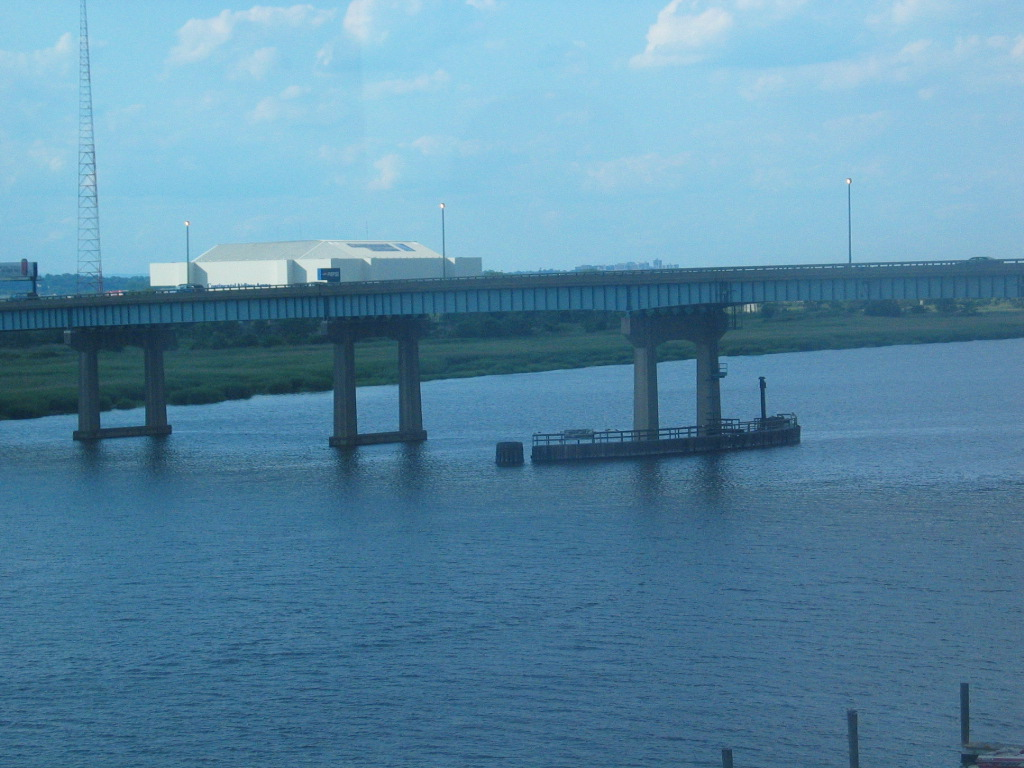
Route 3 westbound bridge

40°48′02″N 74°04′01″W

The bridge (NJ ID number 0204151) is also dedicated as the Medgar Evers Bridge. It was built in 1963 and rehabilitated in 2011.

== See also ==
- List of crossings of the Hackensack River
