= New Jersey Route 3 =

State highway in New Jersey, US

Route 3
- Map of northeast New Jersey with NJ 3 in red and former NJ 153 in pink

Route information
- Maintained by NJDOT
- Length: 10.84 mi (17.45 km)
- Existed: 1927–present

Major junctions
- West end: US 46 / CR 621 in Clifton
- G.S. Parkway in Clifton; Route 21 in Clifton; CR 507 in Lyndhurst; Route 17 in Rutherford; I-95 Toll / N.J. Turnpike / Route 120 in East Rutherford; I-95 Toll / N.J. Turnpike in Secaucus
- East end: US 1-9 / Route 495 in North Bergen

Location
- Country: United States
- State: New Jersey
- Counties: Passaic, Bergen, Hudson

Highway system
- New Jersey State Highway Routes; Interstate; US; State; Scenic Byways
← Route 2	→ Route 4
← Route 152	Route 153	→ Route 154

Route 3 is a state highway in the northeastern part of New Jersey. The route runs 10.84 miles (17.45 km) from U.S. Route 46 (US 46) in Clifton, Passaic County, to US 1/9 in North Bergen, Hudson County. The route intersects many major roads, including US 46, which takes travelers to Interstate 80 (I-80) west for commuting out of the city-area, the Garden State Parkway and Route 21 in Clifton, Route 17 and the Western Spur of the New Jersey Turnpike (I-95) in East Rutherford, the Eastern Spur of the New Jersey Turnpike (also I-95) in Secaucus, and Route 495 in North Bergen, for traffic going to the Lincoln Tunnel into New York City. Route 3 serves as the main artery to the Lincoln Tunnel from I-80, in conjunction with a portion of US 46 and Route 495. Portions of the route are not up to freeway standards; with driveways serving businesses and bus stops. Despite this, many construction projects have been underway over the years to alleviate this issue. Route 3 also provided access to Hoffmann La Roche's former American headquarters in Nutley, the Meadowlands Sports Complex and American Dream in East Rutherford. The road inspired a story in The New Yorker in 2004 by Ian Frazier due to its views of the Manhattan skyline. Route 3 was originally the Lincoln Tunnel Approach and ended at the state line in the Hudson River, though it was scaled back following the construction of I-495; which is now Route 495 due to also not meeting interstate highway standards.

Route 3 was originally established in 1927 to run from the New York state line on the west shore of Greenwood Lake to Secaucus. In 1929, the western terminus was cut back to Paterson when the alignment west of there was planned to become part of Route S4B. Route 3 originally followed present-day Route 20 through Paterson and ran along local streets to East Rutherford, where it followed present-day Route 120 and Paterson Plank Road to Secaucus. It was extended east to the Lincoln Tunnel in 1939. The section of Route 3 between US 46 in Clifton and East Rutherford was completed in the 1940s as Route S3 as well as the Secaucus Bypass, which was designated a bypass of Route 3. Route 3 was moved to the Route S3 freeway and the Secaucus Bypass in 1953 and was truncated to US 1/9 in North Bergen in 1959 when the Lincoln Tunnel approach was designated as I-495. The Route 3 freeway has seen many improvements over the years, such as widening and interchange reconstructions. It underwent a major reconstruction, completed in 2016, to modern highway standards with bridge replacements, including a new Passaic River bridge between Clifton and Route 17 in Rutherford.

== Route description ==
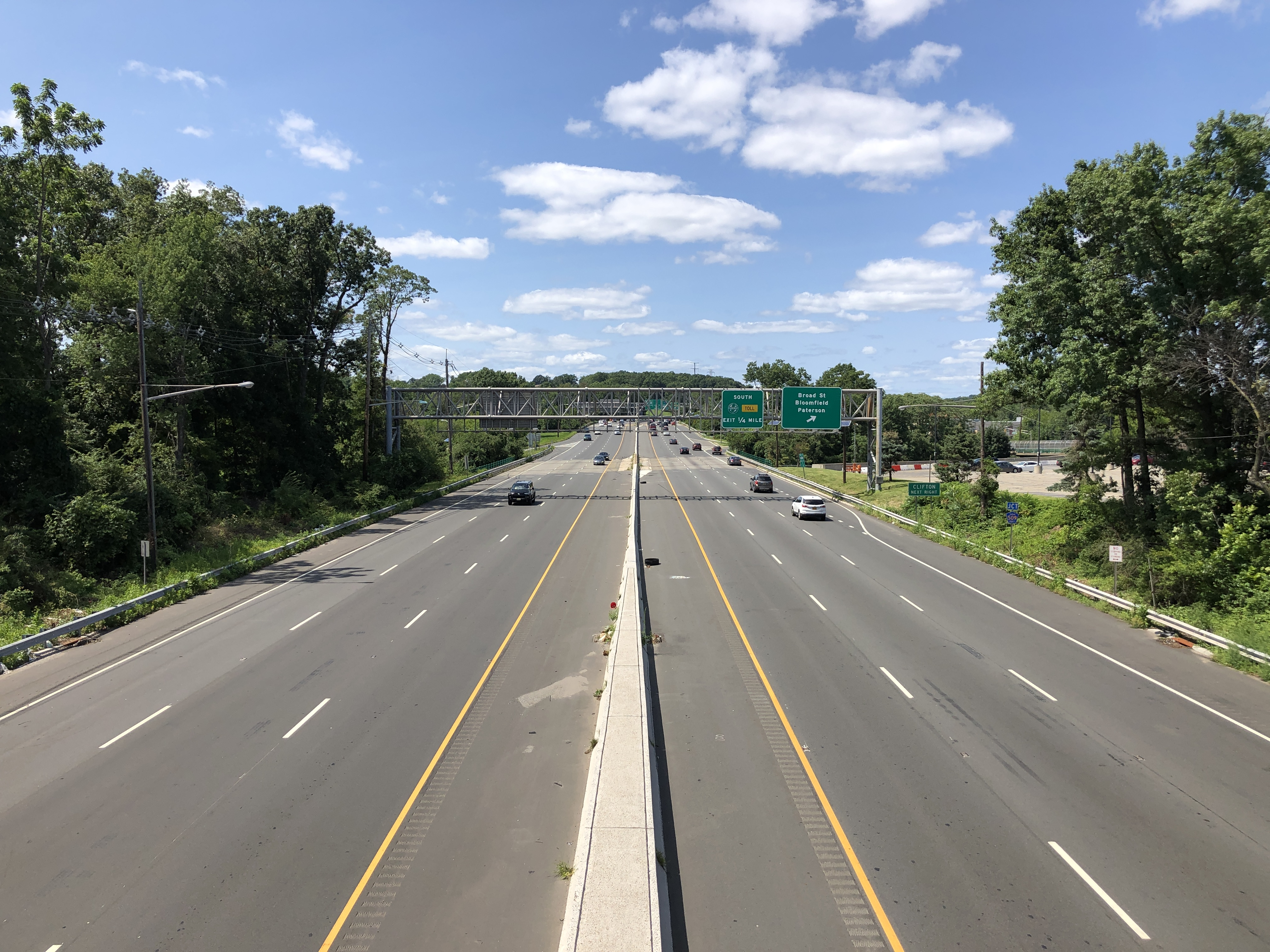
Route 3 westbound at the Garden State Parkway interchange in Clifton

Route 3 heads to the southeast, from an interchange with US 46 and Valley Road (County Route 621 [CR 621]) as a six-lane arterial road with a jersey barrier. It is not up to freeway standards, as it contains a few businesses with right-in/right-out access. The route intersects Grove Street (CR 623) and Broad Street (CR 509), then the Garden State Parkway, where it passes south of the Allwood Road Park & Ride, a park and ride lot serving NJ Transit buses. All interchange movements are present between Route 3 and the Garden State Parkway, except from the southbound Garden State Parkway to westbound Route 3 and from eastbound Route 3 to the northbound Garden State Parkway.

Past the Garden State Parkway, Route 3 intersects Bloomfield Avenue (CR 622), before it passes over Norfolk Southern's Newark Industrial Track line and intersects Passaic Avenue (CR 603), which heads south into Nutley to become Route 7. The next interchange is for Main Avenue (CR 601). Past that interchange, Route 3 passes over NJ Transit's Main Line and comes to an interchange with Route 21 before passing over the route and becoming a six-lane freeway.

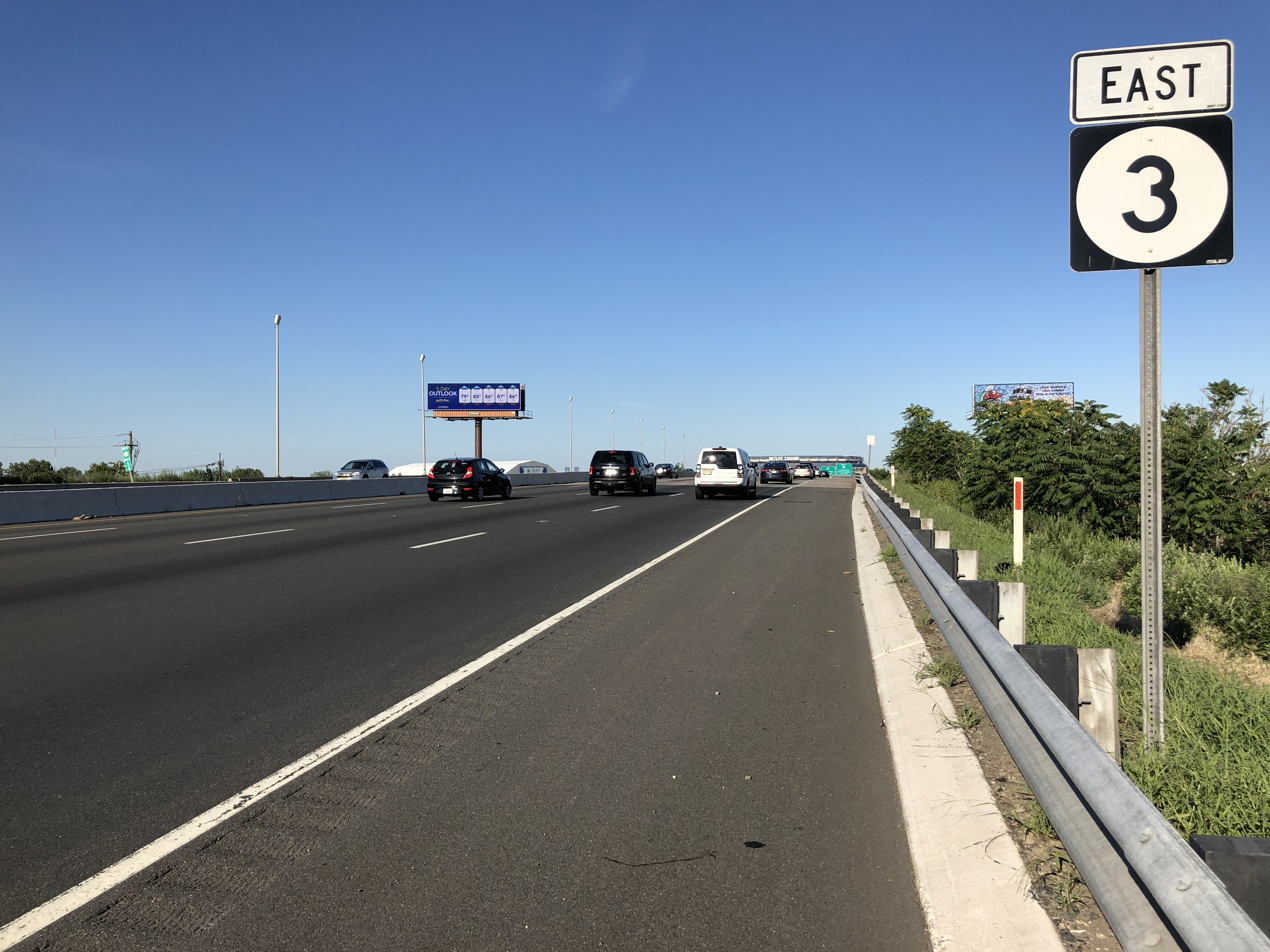
Route 3 eastbound past Route 17 in Rutherford

Route 3 crosses the Passaic River on a fixed bridge, which replaced a double-leaf trunnion bascule bridge in 2013, into Rutherford, Bergen County. Just after crossing the river, the route intersects Riverside Avenue (CR 507). The freeway continues through a residential area and comes to an exit that provides access to southbound Route 17. Past this interchange, Route 3 is closely paralleled by Route 17 to the south until Route 3 intersects Route 17 again, which continues to the north of Route 3.

The route widens to eight lanes and enters the Meadowlands, crossing into East Rutherford and then passing over NJ Transit's Bergen County Line and Berrys Creek. Route 3 passes to the south of the Meadowlands Sports Complex, which contains MetLife Stadium (the home stadium of the New York Giants and the New York Jets of the National Football League), and the Meadowlands Racetrack. The route narrows back to six lanes and comes to a ramp which provides access to the Western Spur of the New Jersey Turnpike (I-95). Route 3 intersects Route 120 and the carriageways separate. The route passes under the Western Spur of the New Jersey Turnpike (I-95) and becomes eight lanes again.

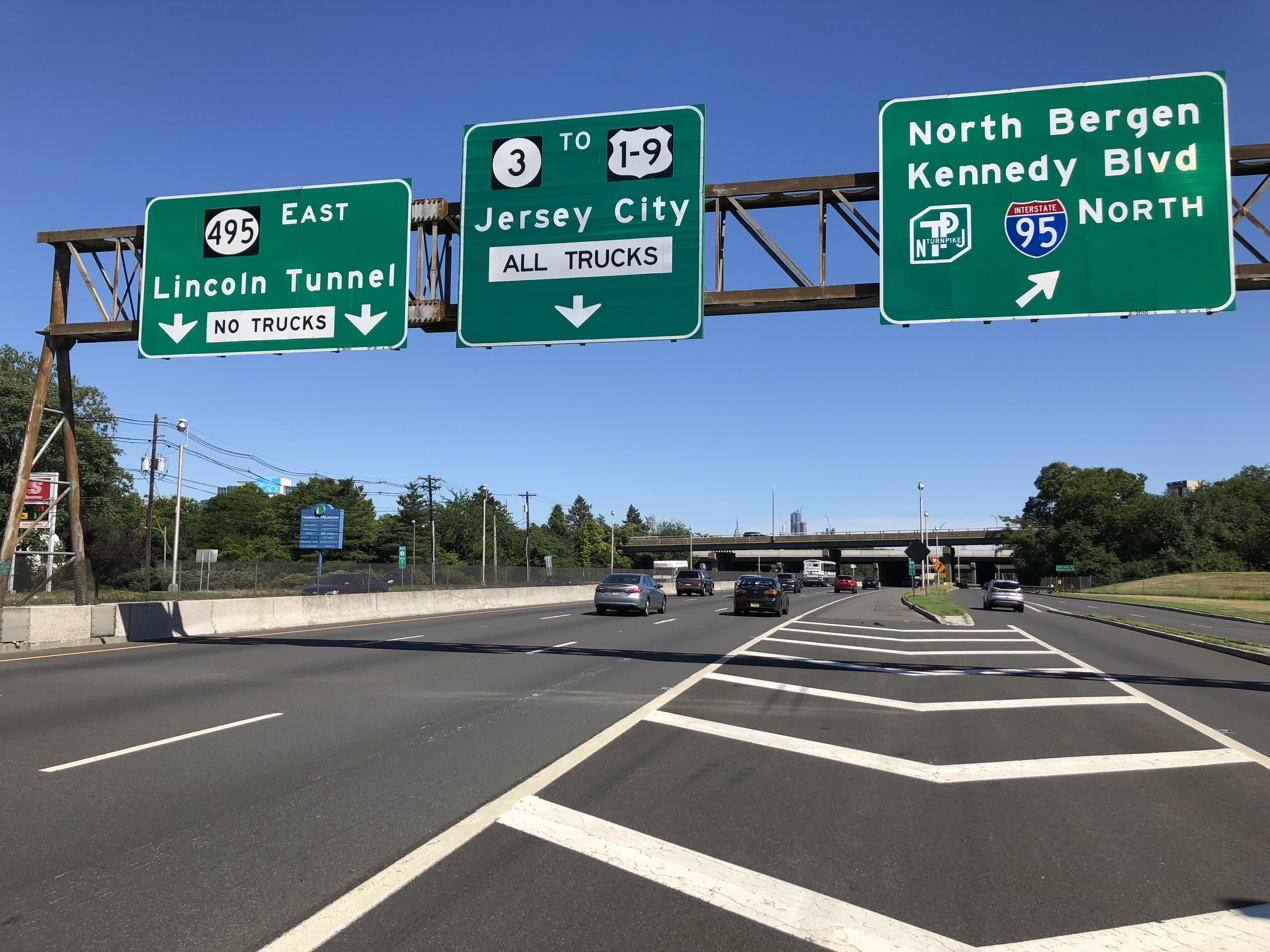
Route 3 eastbound at exit for the Eastern Spur of the New Jersey Turnpike (I-95) in Secaucus

The Route 3 Bridge crosses the Hackensack River into Secaucus, Hudson County. It intersects the Meadowlands Parkway and continues southeast into a residential area with the carriageways joining back together. At the interchange with Paterson Plank Road (CR 681), Route 3 widens into a local-express lane configuration with three express lanes and three local lanes each in the eastbound direction and two express lanes and three local lanes in the westbound direction. The route passes by the Mill Creek Mall and crosses under the Eastern Spur of the New Jersey Turnpike (I-95). Route 3 comes to an eastbound exit and entrance with Harmon Meadow Boulevard and features a cloverleaf interchange with Paterson Plank Road. The route crosses the Penhorn Creek into North Bergen. In North Bergen, the route comes to a truck-restricted eastbound ramp for eastbound Route 495. Route 3 then intersects Route 495, which provides access to the New Jersey Turnpike and the Lincoln Tunnel. Past this interchange, the local-express lane configuration ends and Route 3 heads southeast as a four-lane highway. The route meets a westbound exit and entrance for the North Bergen Park & Ride serving NJ Transit buses and passes over New York, Susquehanna and Western Railway's New Jersey Subdivision line and Conrail Shared Assets Operations' Northern Branch line before it comes to its terminus at a traffic light with US 1/9 south, with no direct access from Route 3 east to US 1/9 north.

== History ==
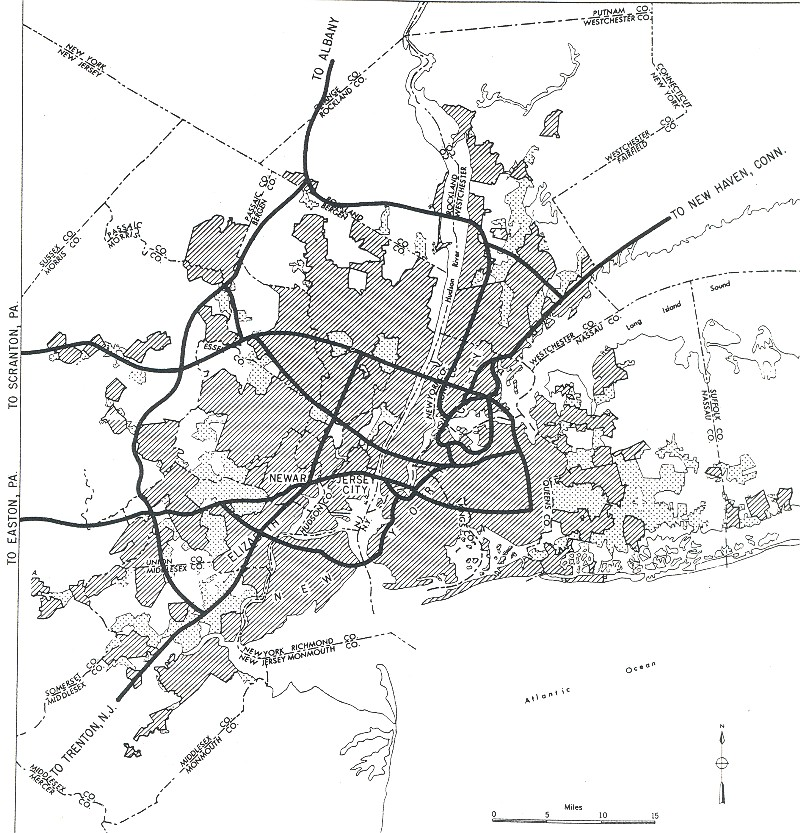
1955 Yellow Book map of New York City, showing a planned Interstate Highway along the Route 3 corridor.

Route 3 roughly follows the course of the Paterson and New York Plank Road (more commonly known as the Paterson Plank Road) legislated in 1851 to run from Paterson to a ferry at Hoboken. The portion of this road running east from Passaic was legislated as an unnumbered state route in 1926. In the 1927 New Jersey state highway renumbering, Route 3 was legislated to run from the New York line on the west shore of Greenwood Lake to Route 1 (now US 1/9) in Secaucus. In 1929, the route west of Paterson was designated to become part of Route S4B, a spur of Route 4, and Route 3 was modified to end at Route S4B north of Paterson. Route S4B was never built west of Paterson while the portion that was built became Route 208 in 1953.

Following the 1929 amendments, Route 3 ran from Paterson along today's Route 20, through Clifton, Passaic, Wallington, Carlstadt, and East Rutherford along local streets, and finally down Paterson Plank Road (part of which is today's Route 120) to Secaucus. Before 1938, a bypass around the original Paterson Plank Road bridge over the Hackensack River was built, parts of which were later incorporated into today's Route 120. As of this point, plans were in place to bypass the Plank Road to the north, going north of Wood Ridge and Wallington and replacing River Road up to Route 6, where it would rejoin the old alignment. In 1939, Route 3 was extended east along present-day Route 495 to the Lincoln Tunnel into Manhattan.

Route S3
- Location: Clifton–East Rutherford
- Existed: 1929–1953

The section of what is now Route 3 from US 46 in Clifton to Route 120 in East Rutherford was planned to be built as a freeway in the mid-1930s designated as Route S3, a spur of Route 3. Construction started in 1940, but it was interrupted by World War II. It would resume, with the first section of freeway opening between Route 17 to Route 3 (now Route 120) in 1942. The freeway was completed by 1949, including a bypass of Secaucus that was designated as a bypass of Route 3. The freeway had cost a total of $10 million to build and cut commuting times between Northern New Jersey and Manhattan. Before the freeway was completed, Route S3 was designated to follow Allwood Road between Hepburn Road and Bloomfield Avenue in Clifton; the road was later returned to Passaic County and is currently CR 602. In 1942, a spur of Route S3 in Clifton was commissioned; this became Route S3 Spur in 1948 and Route 161 in 1953.

In the 1953 New Jersey state highway renumbering, Route 3 was realigned to follow the entire length of the Route S3 freeway. In addition, Route 3 in Secaucus was shifted off the Paterson Plank Road to the newly built Secaucus Bypass. The original alignment of Route 3 through Secaucus (partly now known as Flanagan Way) became Route 153; the entire route was eliminated by the late 1980s. The remaining sections under state maintenance were designated as Route 20, still under the assumption that they would be joined in the future. In the mid-1950s, Route 3 was planned as one of the original routes of the Interstate Highway System; however, the New Jersey State Highway Department had deemed it too expensive to bring it up to Interstate Highway standards and I-280 was favored instead. In 1959, the Lincoln Tunnel approach was designated as I-495 and Route 3 was truncated back to US 1/9 in North Bergen.

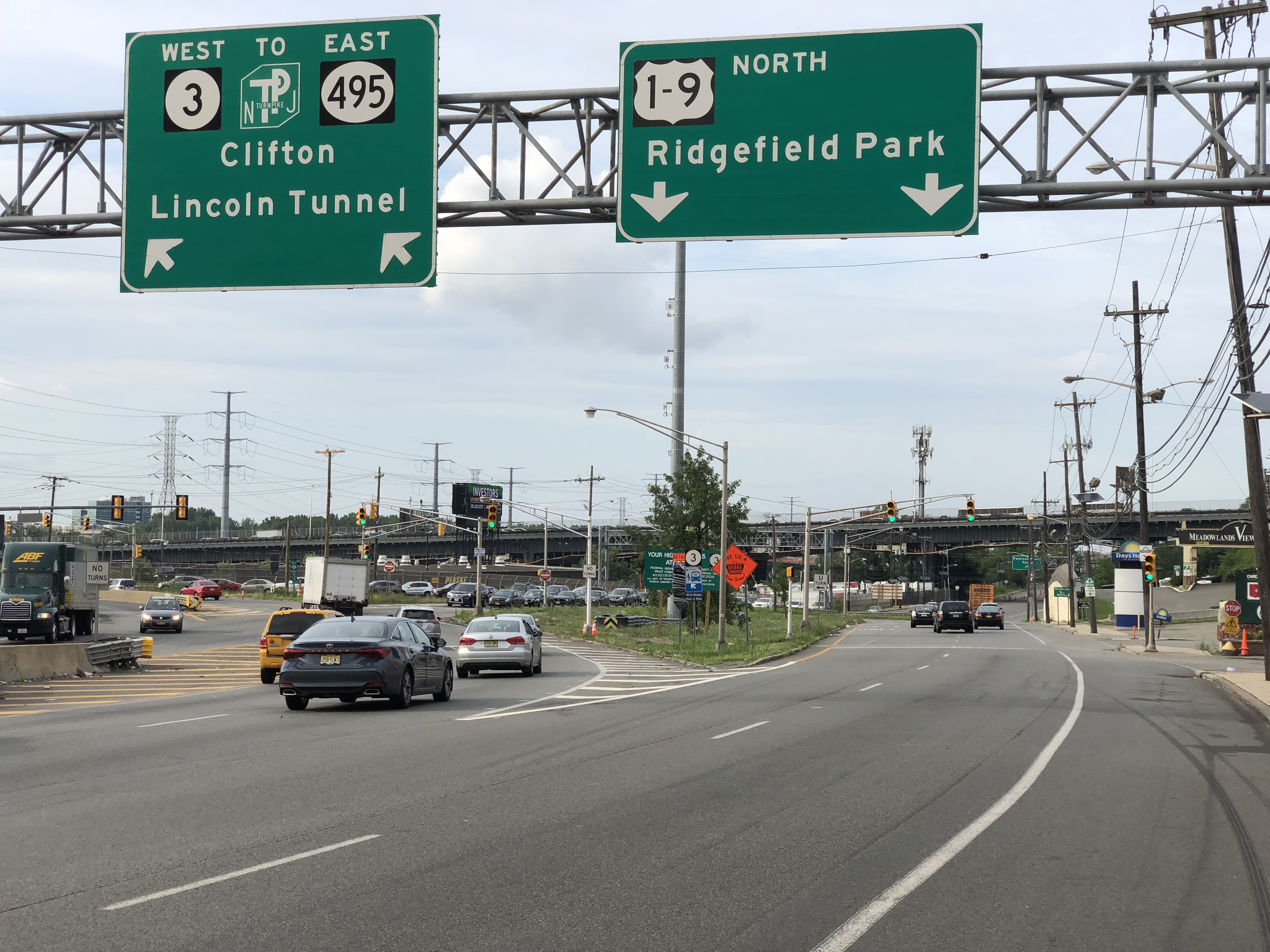
East end of Route 3 at US 1/9 in North Bergen

Many improvements have been made to the Route 3 freeway. In the 1970s, the interchanges with Route 17, the New Jersey Turnpike Western Spur, and Route 120 were improved with the construction of the Meadowlands Sports Complex in the area. The bridge over the Berrys Creek, originally built in 1948, was reconstructed in the mid-1990s and Route 3 was widened to eight lanes in the area near the bridge. In 2003, the interchange with Route 495 and the intersection with US 1/9 was improved at a cost of $16 million.

Plans were made to improve Route 3 near the Meadowlands Sports Complex with the construction of the American Dream shopping and entertainment complex. An overpass between eastbound Route 3 and northbound Route 120 was completed in May 2009 at a cost of $38.1 million, a flyover from southbound Route 120 to eastbound Route 3 was completed in early 2010 at a cost of $13 million, and improvements to the New Jersey Turnpike interchange was completed in the later part of 2010 at a cost of $49 million.

Route 3 underwent a major reconstruction to modern highway standards with noise walls installed and bridge replacements, including the new Passaic River bridge that is now functional, between Main Avenue in Clifton and Route 17 in Rutherford. All work was completed by 2016. In a separate project, the roadway was resurfaced in 2013 from just west of the Route 17 north interchange to US 1/9 in North Bergen.

The New Jersey Department of Transportation is rebuilding the interchange at US 46 and Valley Road in Clifton. This project will reconfigure ramps, bring bridges up to standard, and will provide for three-lane connections between Route 3 and US 46. It is projected to cost more than $250 million. Construction on the first contract began in December 2015 with completion by October 2019. Construction on the second contract began in February 2020. In January 2022, the officials announced funding of a project to replace the 1934 eastbound bridge over the Hackensack River. The new bridge structure will be able to support adding light rail over the bridge in the future. The plan is to have a new light rail line from Secaucus Junction to MetLife Stadium and American Dream, but funding for the light rail is not immediately available.

== In popular culture ==
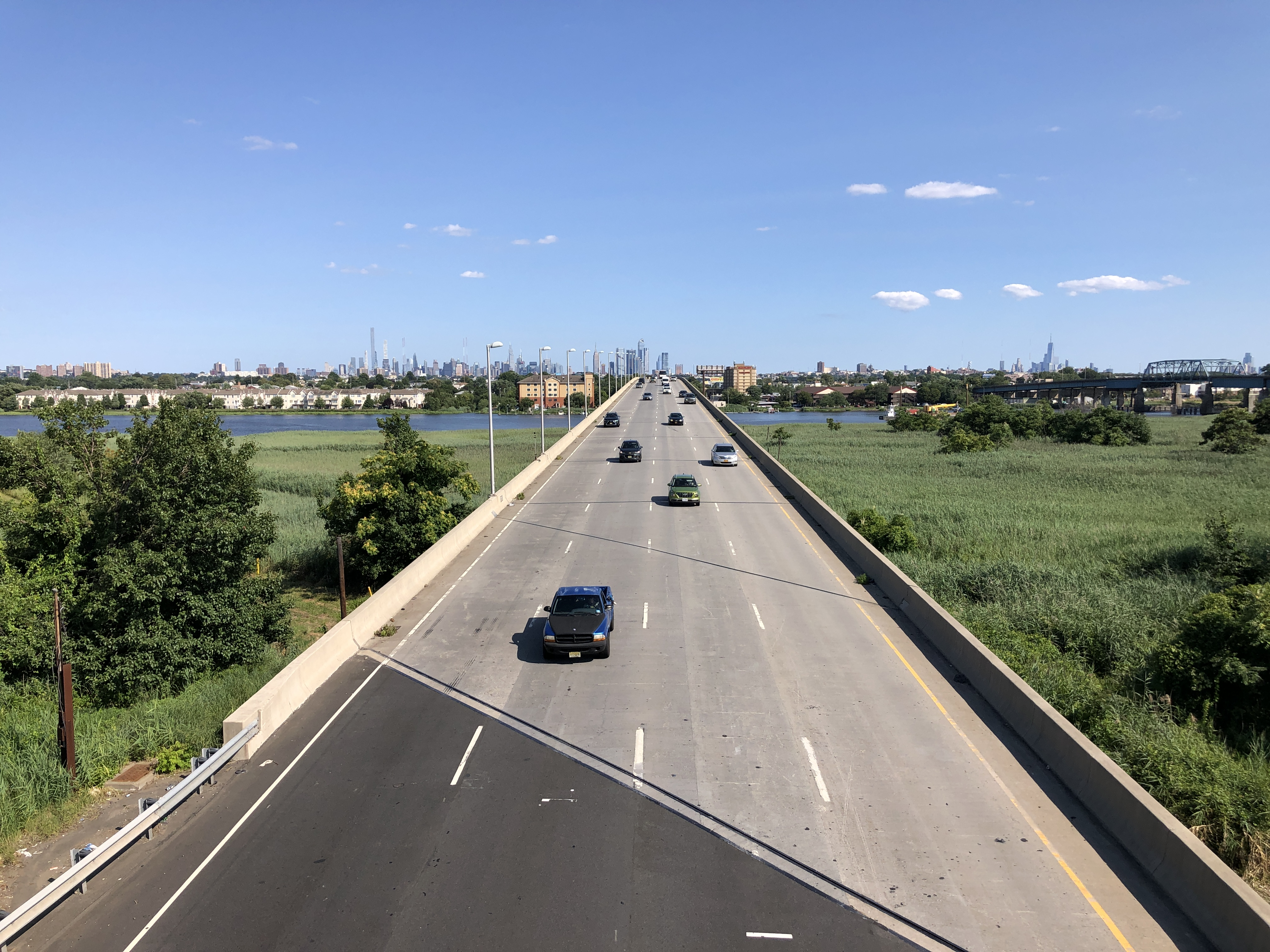
View east along Route 3 westbound as it crosses the Hackensack River in the Meadowlands, with the New York City skyline visible in the distance

Route 3 was the inspiration for a story in The New Yorker in 2004 by Ian Frazier, for its iconic views of the Manhattan skyline. In this story, Frazier describes a bus journey along the route, mentioning scenes along the road such as traffic congestion, the Meadowlands Sports Complex, and the Tick Tock Diner off Route 3 in Clifton. He also described a walking journey he once took into New York City along Route 3, encountering heavy, noisy traffic speeding by and debris along the side of the road.

In a Saturday Night Live sketch featuring Horatio Sanz and Derek Jeter, the fictional business "Derek Jeter's Taco Hole" is on Route 3 in Nutley, New Jersey between Kinko's and "El Duque's Shoe Repair". (Route 3 does not actually pass through Nutley.)

== Exit list ==
All exits are unnumbered.

County	Location	mi	km	Destinations	Notes
Passaic	Clifton	0.00	0.00	US 46 west	Western terminus
Passaic	Clifton			CR 621 (Valley Road) – Montclair, Paterson	Westbound exit and eastbound entrance
Passaic	Clifton	0.51	0.82	CR 623 (Grove Street) – Montclair, Paterson	
Passaic	Clifton	1.26	2.03	CR 509 (Broad Street) – Bloomfield, Paterson	
Passaic	Clifton	1.44– 1.53	2.32– 2.46	G.S. Parkway	No eastbound access to GSP north; exits 153A-B on G.S. Parkway
Passaic	Clifton	2.64	4.25	CR 622 (Bloomfield Avenue) – Bloomfield, Passaic	
Passaic	Clifton	3.41	5.49	Route 7 / CR 603 (Passaic Avenue) – Nutley, Passaic	
Passaic	Clifton	3.82	6.15	CR 601 (Main Avenue) – Nutley, Passaic	
Passaic	Clifton	4.70	7.56	Western end of freeway section	
Passaic	Clifton	4.70	7.56	Route 21 – Newark, Paterson	Exit 9 on Route 21
Bergen	Rutherford	5.01	8.06	CR 507 – Rutherford, Lyndhurst	Eastbound exit and westbound entrance
Bergen	Rutherford	5.67	9.12	To CR 507 (Riverside Avenue) – Rutherford, Lyndhurst	Westbound exit and entrance; access to CR 507 via Marginal Road; access to Rutherford/Lyndhurst via Ridge Road
Bergen	Rutherford	6.36– 6.39	10.24– 10.28	Route 17 / Service Road – Lyndhurst, Rutherford	Service Road not signed eastbound
Bergen	East Rutherford	7.21	11.60	Route 120 north – East Rutherford, Sports Complex, American Dream	Eastbound exit only
Bergen	East Rutherford	7.27	11.70	I-95 Toll / N.J. Turnpike	I-95 not signed westbound; exit 16W of the Western Spur
Bergen	East Rutherford	7.58– 7.96	12.20– 12.81	Route 120 north – East Rutherford, Sports Complex, American Dream	No eastbound exit; southern terminus of Route 120
Hackensack River				Route 3 Bridge	
Hudson	Secaucus	8.60	13.84	Meadowlands Parkway	
Hudson	Secaucus	9.12	14.68	I-95 Toll south / N.J. Turnpike south – Secaucus	Eastbound exit and westbound entrance; access to Secaucus via CR 681
Hudson	Secaucus	9.6	15.4	To I-95 north / N.J. Turnpike north / Kennedy Boulevard (CR 501) – North Bergen	Eastbound exit and westbound entrance
Hudson	Secaucus	9.9	15.9	Service Road – Secaucus	Westbound exit only
Hudson	North Bergen	10.33– 10.46	16.62– 16.83	Route 495 to I-95 / N.J. Turnpike – Lincoln Tunnel	No westbound access to Route 495 east; Route 495 west not signed; former I-495
Hudson	North Bergen	10.50	16.90	Route 495 east to Kennedy Boulevard (CR 501) – Lincoln Tunnel, New York City	Eastbound exit only; former I-495
Hudson	North Bergen	10.70	17.22	Route 495 east – Lincoln Tunnel, Park & Ride	Westbound exit and entrance
Hudson	North Bergen	10.84	17.45	US 1-9 south – Jersey City	Eastern terminus
1.000 mi = 1.609 km; 1.000 km = 0.621 mi: Incomplete access; Tolled
