= New Jersey Route 17 =

State highway in Bergen County, New Jersey, US

Route 17

Route information
- Maintained by NJDOT
- Length: 27.20 mi (43.77 km)
- Existed: 1942 (1927 as Route 2)–present

Major junctions
- South end: Route 7 / CR 507 in North Arlington
- Route 3 in Lyndhurst and Rutherford; Route 120 / CR 120 in East Rutherford; US 46 in Hasbrouck Heights; I-80 / CR 57 in Hackensack; Route 4 in Paramus; G.S. Parkway in Paramus; US 202 in Mahwah; I-287 in Mahwah
- North end: I-87 / I-287 / New York Thruway / NY 17 at the New York state line

Location
- Country: United States
- State: New Jersey
- Counties: Bergen

Highway system
- New Jersey State Highway Routes; Interstate; US; State; Scenic Byways
← Route 15	→ Route 18
← Route 1	Route 2	→ Route 3

Route 17 is a state highway in Bergen County, New Jersey, United States, that provides a major route from the George Washington Bridge, Lincoln Tunnel and other northeast New Jersey points to the New York State Thruway at Suffern, New York. It runs 27.20 mi (43.77 km) from an intersection with Route 7 and County Route 507 (CR 507) in North Arlington north to the New York state line along Interstate 287 (I-287) in Mahwah, where New York State Route 17 (NY 17) continues into New York. Between Route 7 and Route 3 in Rutherford, Route 17 serves as a local road. From Route 3 north to the junction with U.S. Route 46 (US 46) in Hasbrouck Heights, the road is an arterial road with jughandles. The portion of Route 17 from US 46 to I-287 near the state line in Mahwah is a four- to six-lane expressway with all cross traffic handled by interchanges, and many driveways and side streets accessed from right-in/right-out ramps from the right lane. For three miles (5 km) north of Route 4, well over a hundred retail stores and several large shopping malls line the route in the borough of Paramus. The remainder of this portion of Route 17 features lighter suburban development. The northernmost portion of Route 17 in Mahwah runs concurrently with I-287 to the New York state line.

Prior to 1927, the route was designated as Route 17N, which was to run from Newark to the New York state line. This route had followed various local streets, including Franklin Turnpike north of Hackensack. In 1927, Route 17N became Route 2, which was designated along the portion of Route 17N between Route 7 in North Arlington to the New York border near Suffern, New York. This route was moved to a multilane divided highway alignment north of Rutherford by 1937. Route 2 became Route 17 in 1942 to match the designation of NY 17 for defense purposes during World War II. The entire Route 17 corridor was once planned to be a freeway until the 1960s, and later plans to extend the route south of Route 3 to I-280 in 1972 and to the New Jersey Turnpike in 1987 both failed. Over the years, the portion of Route 17 north of Route 3 has seen many improvements, including the widening of much of the road to six lanes and the removal of most at-grade intersections in the 1950s as well as more recent improvements to the interchanges with Route 4 in Paramus in 1999 and Essex Street/Maywood Avenue on the Lodi/Maywood border in 2008. The route is currently undergoing improvements between Route 3 and US 46 and is expected to see improvements from Williams Avenue in Hasbrouck Heights to south of Route 4 in Paramus.

== Route description ==
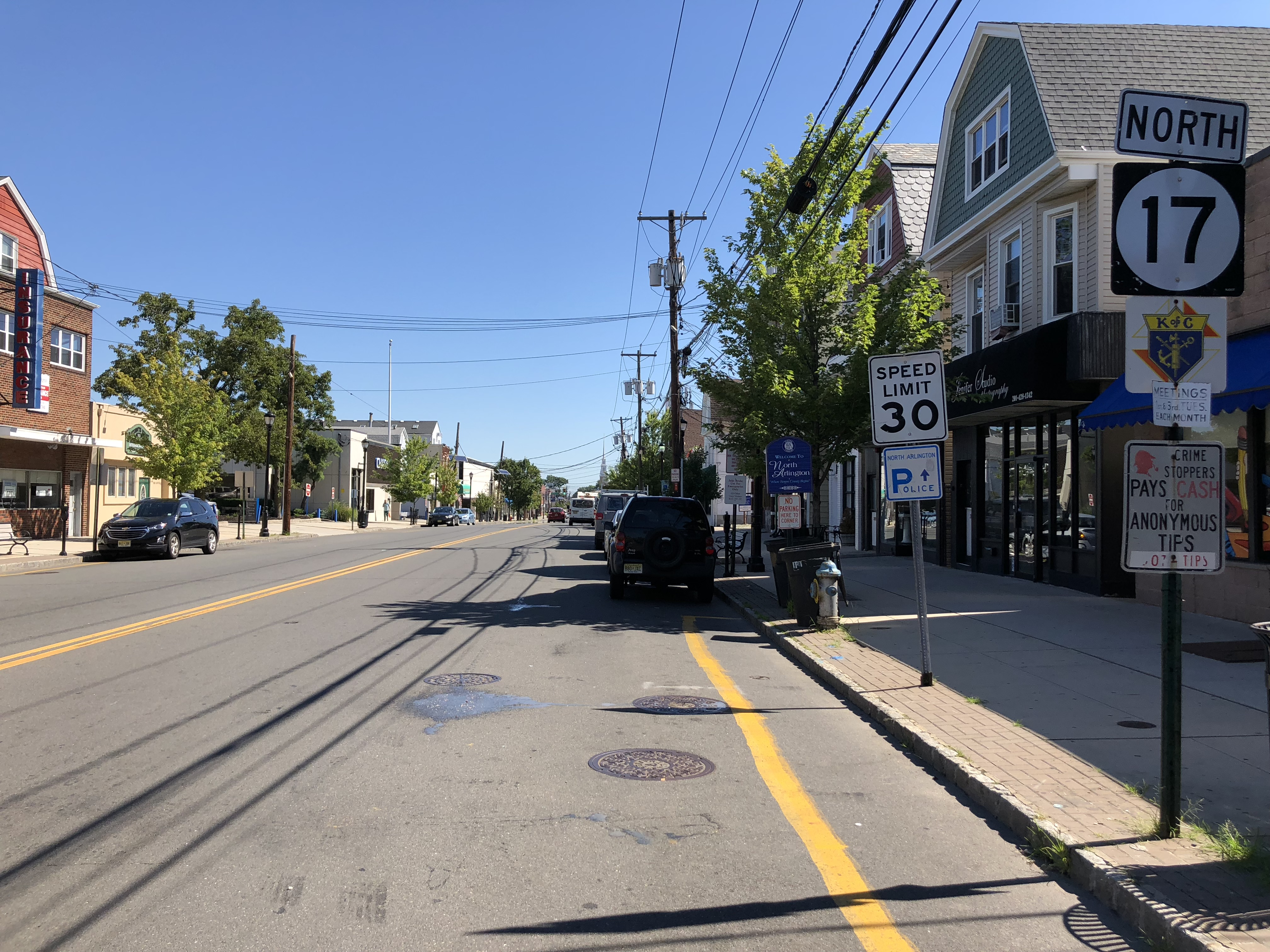
First northbound Route 17 reassurance shield past the southern terminus at Route 7/CR 507 in North Arlington

Route 17 begins at an intersection with Route 7 and CR 507 (Belleville Turnpike) on the border of Kearny, Hudson County and North Arlington, Bergen County. It heads north through North Arlington on Ridge Road, a two-lane local street that passes by businesses and the Holy Cross Cemetery on the east side of the road. It intersects CR 26 (Jauncey Avenue) and crosses into Lyndhurst at the Lincoln Avenue intersection. In Lyndhurst, Route 17 intersects CR 28 (Kingsland Avenue) and passes over NJ Transit's Main Line at the former Kingsland station. At the intersection of CR 30 (Rutherford Avenue), which runs along the border of Lyndhurst and Rutherford, the route turns east onto Rutherford Avenue to parallel the Route 3 freeway to the south and head for the edge of the New Jersey Meadowlands, widening to a four-lane arterial road at the intersection with Orient Way. Route 17 makes a curve to the south, crossing entirely into Lyndhurst, and makes a hairpin turn to the north, widening to a divided highway. The road then crosses into Rutherford and comes to the Route 3 interchange.

Past the Route 3 interchange, Route 17 continues north as a six-lane arterial road with intersections featuring jughandles. It passes through residential and commercial areas of Rutherford, intersecting CR 32 (Meadow Road) before crossing under NJ Transit's Bergen County Line and into East Rutherford, where it intersects CR S32 (Union Avenue) before interchanging with Route 120 and CR 120 (Paterson Plank Road). The route runs through Carlstadt, where it crosses into Wood-Ridge. Route 17 comes to an interchange with CR 36 (Moonachie Road) before entering Hasbrouck Heights. With the exception of a short stretch in Rutherford with a median strip, this section of Route 17 is divided by a jersey barrier.

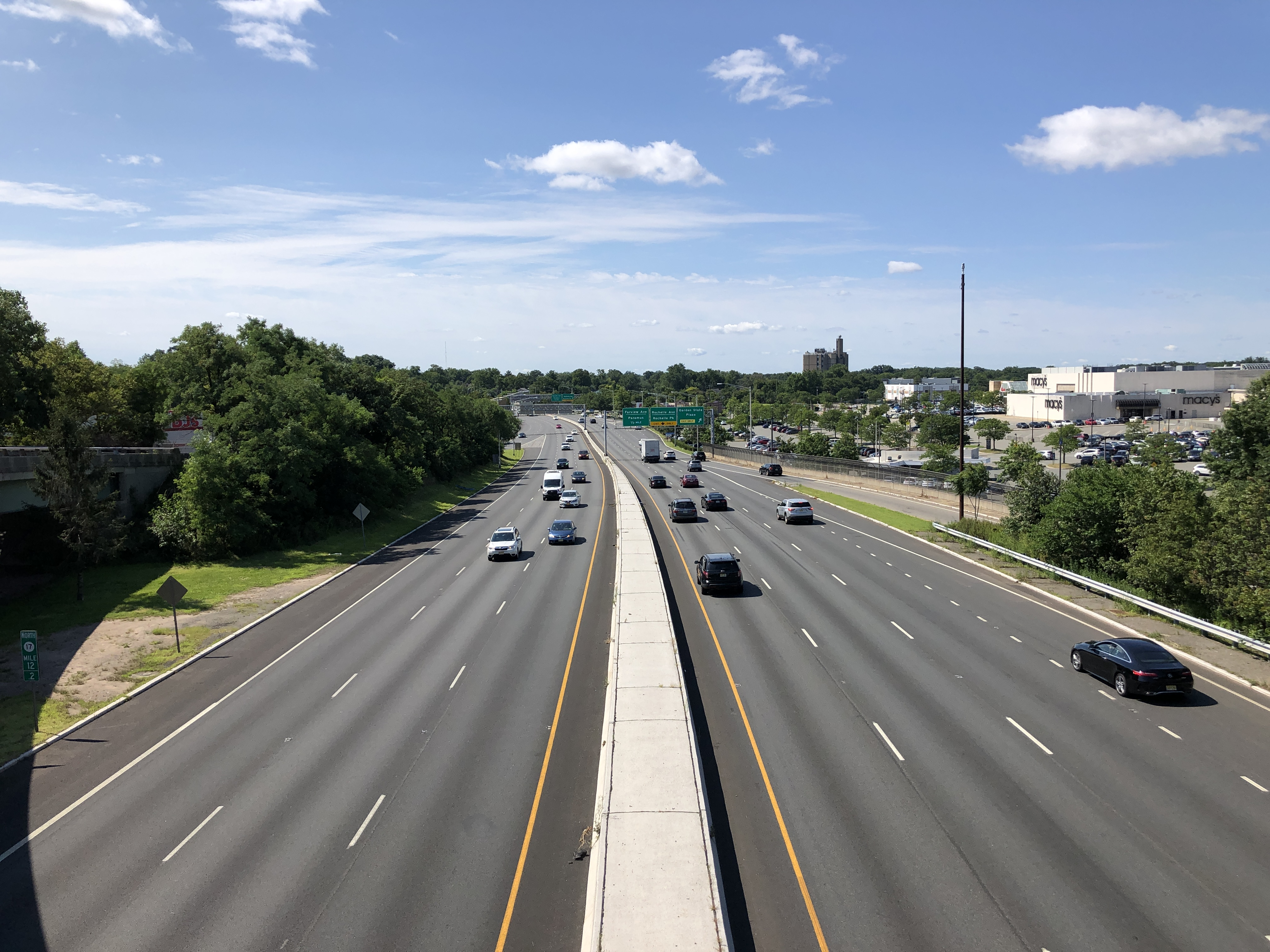
Route 17 southbound past interchange with Route 4 in Paramus. Westfield Garden State Plaza is on the right.

In Hasbrouck Heights, the lanes split with the Bendix Diner located between the traffic lanes at the intersection of CR 40 (Williams Avenue), the northernmost traffic light on Route 17. At the interchange with US 46, which only features access to the eastbound direction of US 46, Route 17 drops to two lanes in each direction and continues north with the lanes merging back together as the road interchanges with CR 55 (Terrace Avenue). The road enters Hackensack with the lanes splitting again for the long interchange with I-80. Along this strip, the road is again three lanes in each direction and includes an interchange with CR 57 (Summit Avenue), crossing into Lodi and heading across the now-defunct New York, Susquehanna and Western Railway's Lodi Branch line. The lanes rejoin upon splitting from I-80 with a lane dropping in each direction at the CR 56 (Essex Street) and CR 59 (Maywood Avenue) interchange on the Maywood border. This portion of the highway is subject to frequent congestion. Route 17 continues north through commercial areas, crossing into Rochelle Park where the route passes over New York, Susquehanna and Western Railway's New Jersey Subdivision line and interchanges with CR 62 (Passaic Street) before entering Paramus.

At the CR 61 (Farview Avenue) interchange, the road regains a third lane in each direction. Route 17 passes by the Westfield Garden State Plaza shopping mall on the west side of the road before coming to an interchange with Route 4. Route 17 is flanked by businesses and shopping malls for most of its length in Paramus. Following Route 4, the road has an interchange with Century Road. Route 17 comes to a partial interchange with the Garden State Parkway, with access limited to northbound-to-northbound and southbound-to-southbound movements between the two roads. North of the Garden State Parkway, Route 17 features interchanges for Midland Avenue, the Paramus Park shopping mall and an industrial park, and CR 80 (Ridgewood Avenue) just north of the Fashion Center shopping mall.

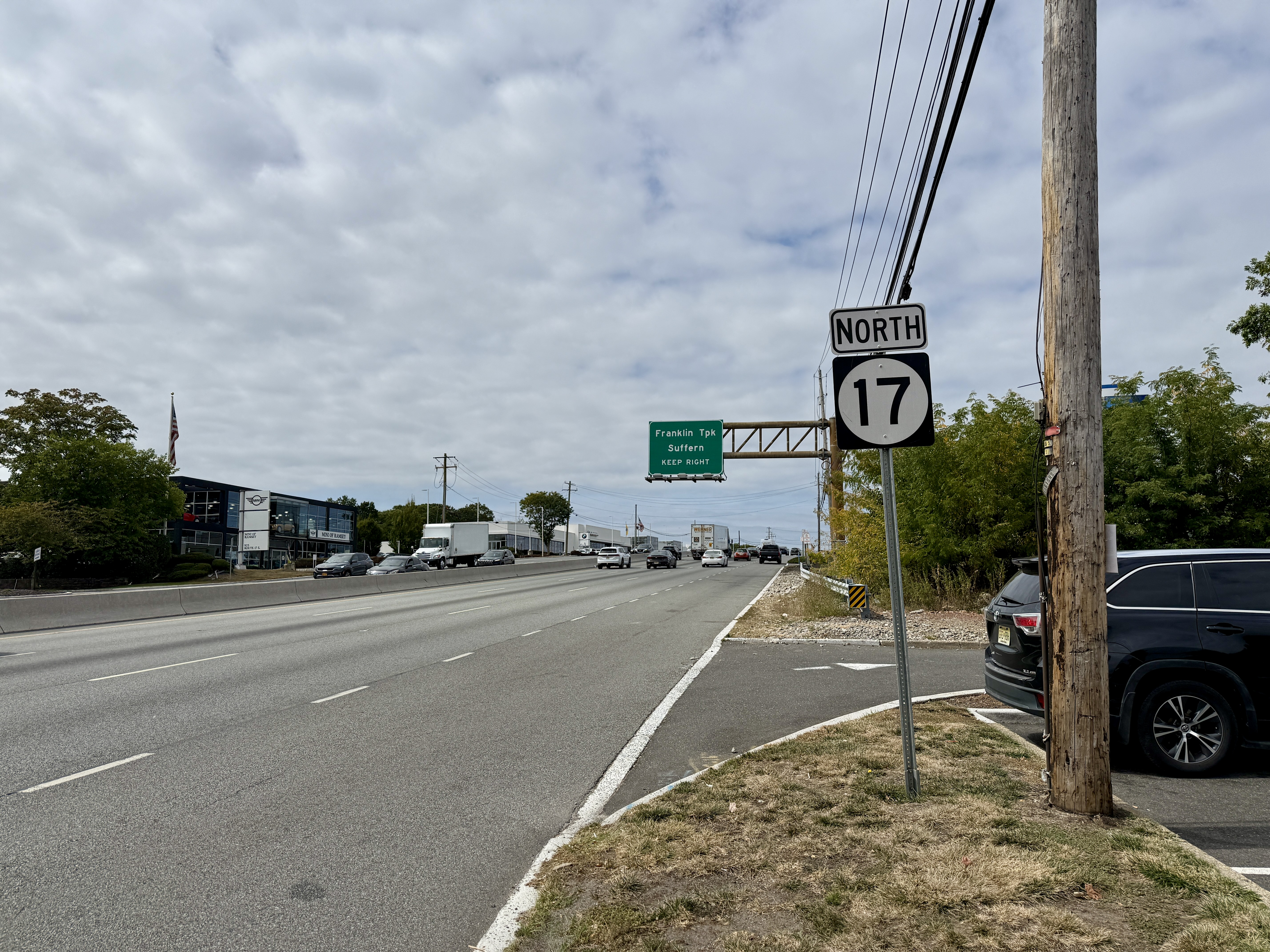
Route 17 northbound in Ramsey

Route 17 crosses into Ridgewood and interchanges with CR 110 (Linwood Avenue), where the penetration of businesses along the side of the road lessens dramatically. In Ridgewood, the road interchanges with CR 62 (Paramus Road), crosses the Saddle River, and intersects a separate segment of CR 62 (Franklin Turnpike) and West Saddle River Road. This intersection, along with other at-grade intersections along this portion of Route 17, is a right-in/right-out (RIRO) intersection with cross traffic blocked by a jersey barrier. Past here, there is a park and ride lot serving Short Line commuter and intercity buses accessible from the southbound direction. There is another RIRO intersection for CR 112 (Race Track Road) on the Ho-Ho-Kus border. Upon crossing into Ho-Ho-Kus, the businesses stop along Route 17 and it comes to an interchange with CR 502 (Hollywood Avenue). The route enters Waldwick and interchanges with CR 77 (Sheridan Avenue). It enters Saddle River, continuing north to an interchange with CR 90 (Allendale Avenue).

Route 17 enters Allendale, with businesses resuming along the road. It enters Upper Saddle River before running through Ramsey, where the road crosses back into Upper Saddle River. The route comes to an interchange with CR 81 (Lake Street/Crescent Avenue), where it crosses back into Ramsey. In Ramsey, Route 17 turns to the northwest and features a RIRO for CR 83 (Airmount Avenue), an interchange with CR 507 (Franklin Turnpike), and an interchange for Island Avenue/Spring Street. The route passes over NJ Transit's Bergen County Line/Main Line near the Ramsey Route 17 station and enters Mahwah. In Mahwah, Route 17 intersects CR 85 (Island Road) and CR 100 (Ramapo Avenue). North of Ramapo Avenue, Route 17 features an interchange with US 202 (Ramapo Valley Road) and crosses the Ramapo River. Route 17 has an interchange with Mountainside Avenue and Crossroads Boulevard just before merging with I-287, which it follows to the New York state line, where the road continues into Hillburn, Rockland County, as I-287 and NY 17, intersecting I-87 (New York State Thruway) shortly after the state line.

== History ==
Route 17 follows the course of the Haginsack Trail, an old Lenape Trail running north from what is now Newark to Suffern, New York, and possibly beyond. The Franklin Turnpike was legislated in 1806 to run from Hackensack north to the New York state line at Suffern. This road was incorporated into two auto trails: the Liberty Highway, signed in 1918 to run from Cleveland, Ohio, to New York City; and the West Shore Route, which ran from New York City to Albany. Both routes followed the same roads in New Jersey, coming in from Suffern, along the Franklin Turnpike, Paramus Road and Passaic Avenue, and local roads through Teaneck and Englewood before taking a ferry at Englewood Cliffs to New York.

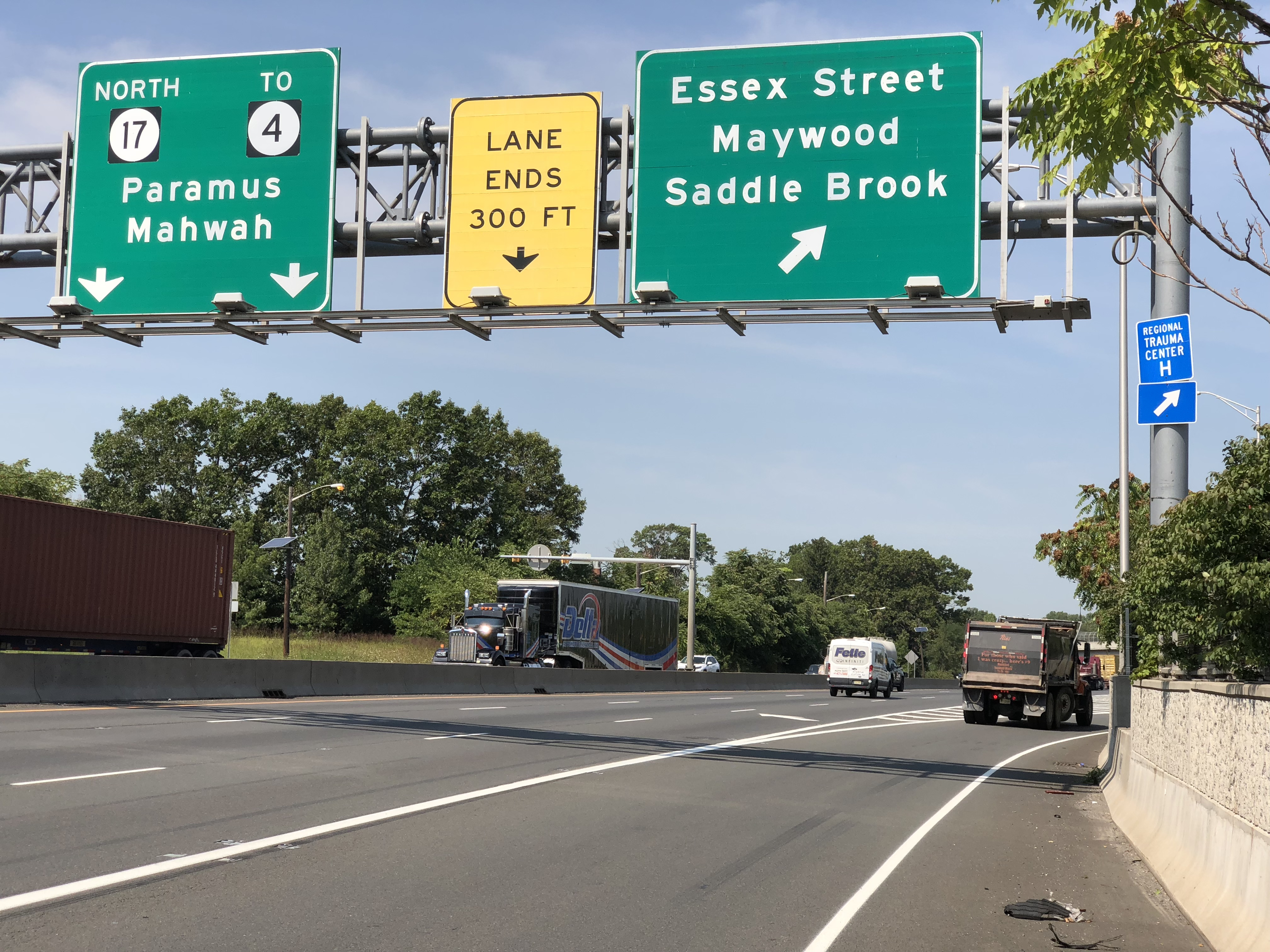
Route 17 northbound in Lodi

Route 17N was defined in 1923 to run "from Newark, by way of Kearny, Rutherford, Hackensack, Ridgewood and Ramsey to the New York State Line". However, only the road north of Route 10 (Essex Street) in Hackensack was shown on the 1925 New Jersey State Highway Department Official State Map, running north along existing roads—First Street and the Franklin Turnpike (now partly called Passaic Street and Paramus Road)—to the state line. The 1927 Tydol Trails Map shows the route running south to Newark, continuing south across Essex Street on Polifly Road, Terrace Avenue and Hackensack Street to East Rutherford, where it followed Meadow Road, Rutherford Avenue, Ridge Road, Kearny Avenue, 4th Street, and the Newark Turnpike to Newark. In 1924, New York had numbered its state routes, and the extension of NY 17N north and west to Westfield, New York was numbered as NY 17, as shown in part on the Tydol Trails Map.

Route 2
- Location: North Arlington–New York state line
- Existed: 1927–1942

In the 1927 New Jersey state highway renumbering, Route 17N received the Route 2 designation, and was defined to run from Route 7 in North Arlington to the New York state line near Suffern, New York. By 1937, the whole old road north of Rutherford was bypassed by a new four-lane divided highway with the exception of the 1927 bridge over the Saddle River in Ridgewood, north of the Paramus Road interchange. This old alignment joins at Paramus Road and leaves just north of the bridge at Franklin Turnpike, which only has access to the southbound lanes through a RIRO intersection. A short-lived spur of Route 2, Route 2N, was defined in 1938 to run from Route 2 (Ridge Road) in Lyndhurst west along Kingsland Avenue and over the Passaic River on the Park Avenue Bridge into Nutley, where it would end at Union Avenue (west of Route 7). In 1930, New York had renumbered its state routes; the extension of Route 2 north and west into New York had remained NY 17. New Jersey had not assigned a Route 17 in the 1927 renumbering, and so in March 1942, Route 2 was numbered Route 17 to match and provide a single number for military caravans during World War II.

Since at least 1936, Route 17 (then Route 2) was planned for upgrading to a freeway, not only north of US 46, but also south to the Newark area. The first plan for a freeway along the length of the route was halted due to World War II, and the second plan for a freeway in the 1960s was cancelled due to the disruption it was projected to cause to businesses and residents along its path. In 1972, there were plans to extend Route 17 past Route 3 to I-280 in Harrison. The plans for this 5 mi (8.0 km), $50 million extension were cancelled due to the defeat of a transportation bond that would have funded the proposed freeway. The interchange at Route 3 was built to allow for this southern extension. Another extension of Route 17 to the New Jersey Turnpike was brought up in 1987, but was ultimately scrapped.

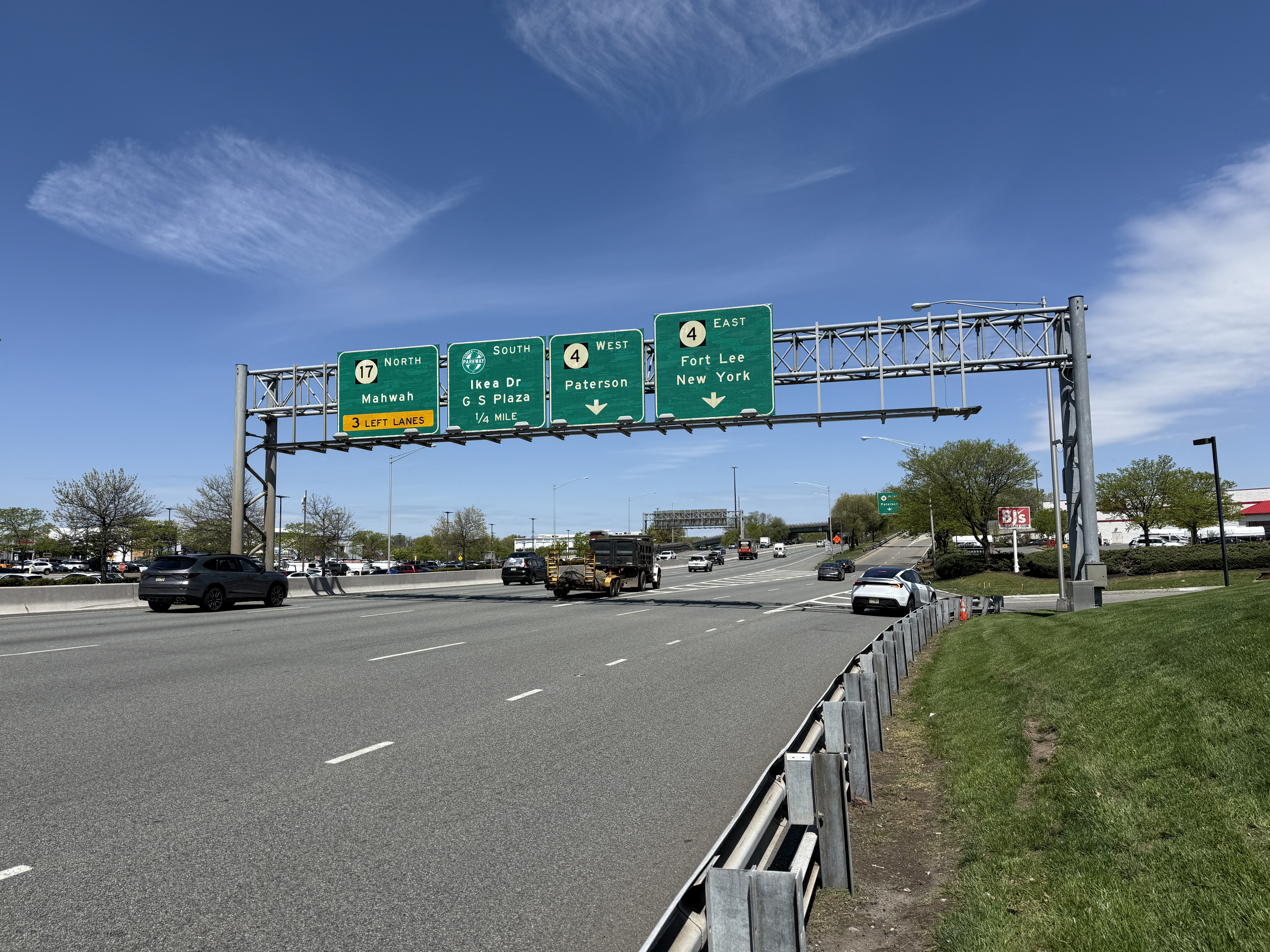
Route 17 northbound at the Route 4 interchange in Paramus

The road north of Route 3 was gradually rebuilt to higher standards between 1953 and 1960; most of this portion of Route 17 was upgraded to six lanes and most at-grade intersections were removed north of I-80 in Lodi. The northern 0.39 mi (0.63 km) of Route 17 in Mahwah was incorporated into Interstate 287 in 1994. The Route 4 interchange in Paramus was rebuilt at a cost of $120 million in 1999, replacing the 1932 cloverleaf interchange by adding several flyover ramps. In 2008, construction was completed at the interchange with Essex Street on the Lodi–Maywood border, which involved replacing the Essex Street bridge over Route 17 and improving the interchange ramps, at a cost of $68 million. On January 14, 2008, Governor Jon Corzine announced plans to reduce congestion and improve safety along the portion of Route 17 between Williams Avenue in Hasbrouck Heights to south of Route 4 in Paramus by making it a consistent six lanes. Also, a $14.7 million effort, begun in September 2008, was undertaken to improve safety and reduce bottlenecks along the section of Route 17 between Route 3 and US 46.

Route 17 has been the object of several studies exploring a Bergen BRT, a bus rapid transit system that would potentially alleviate some traffic congestion and decrease automobile dependency. While funding has not been identified, the potential routes of the system have centered around the vicinity radiating from the malls of Paramus.

On December 8, 2014, the portion of Route 17 in Ramsey was named the Staff Sergeant Timothy R. McGill Memorial Highway in honor of a Ramsey High School graduate, Marine Corps veteran, and local firefighter. On May 11, 2015, the portion of Route 17 in Waldwick was named the Christopher Goodell Memorial Highway in honor of a Waldwick police officer who died when he was struck by a tractor trailer on the highway in July 2014.

== Major intersections ==
The entire route is in Bergen County.

Location	mi	km	Exit	Destinations	Notes
North Arlington	0.00	0.00		Route 7 / CR 507 (Belleville Turnpike) – Jersey City, Belleville, Harrison	Southern terminus
Lyndhurst	2.72	4.38		Route 3 west	Access via Ridge Road
Lyndhurst	3.71	5.97		Service Road	No southbound exit
Rutherford	4.00	6.44		Route 3 to I-95 Toll / N.J. Turnpike – New York City	Interchange
Rutherford	4.23	6.81		Service Road – Local Streets	Southbound exit and northbound entrance; interchange
East Rutherford	5.76	9.27		Route 120 south (Paterson Plank Road) / CR 120 west – Sports Complex	Interchange; CR 120 not signed; former Route 20
Wood-Ridge	6.70	10.78		Wood-Ridge, Moonachie	Interchange; access via CR 36
Hasbrouck Heights	8.44	13.58		US 46 east – George Washington Bridge	Interchange
Hasbrouck Heights	8.76	14.10		Terrace Avenue / Polifly Road to I-80 east – Hackensack, Hasbrouck Heights	Interchange; I-80 and control cities not signed southbound
Hackensack	9.13	14.69		I-80 east – New York	Southbound exit and northbound entrance; exit 64A on I-80
Hackensack	9.33	15.02		Summit Avenue (CR 57) to US 46 west – Hackensack, Hasbrouck Heights	Interchange; no southbound access to Summit Ave north; signed for US 46/Summit Ave/Hackensack northbound, Hasbrouck Hts southbound
Hackensack				I-80 west to G.S. Parkway	Northbound exit and southbound entrance; exit 64A on I-80
Lodi	10.19	16.40		Essex Street (CR 56) to I-80 west – Maywood, Saddle Brook	Interchange; I-80 not signed northbound
Rochelle Park	11.46	18.44		Passaic Street (CR 62) – Rochelle Park, Maywood	Northbound exit and southbound entrance; interchange
Paramus	11.82	19.02		Farview Avenue (CR 61) – Rochelle Park, Paramus	No northbound access to Farview Avenue south; interchange
Paramus	12.30– 12.33	19.79– 19.84		Route 4 to G.S. Parkway south / Ikea Drive – Paterson, Fort Lee, New York City, Garden State Plaza	Interchange
Paramus	12.88	20.73		Century Road – Fair Lawn, River Edge	Interchange
Paramus	13.59	21.87		G.S. Parkway	Same-directional access only; exit 163 on G.S. Parkway
Paramus	14.33	23.06		Midland Avenue – Glen Rock, River Edge	Interchange
Paramus	15.00	24.14		Sears Drive – Paramus Park	Northbound exit and entrance; interchange
Paramus	15.07	24.25		A&S Drive – Paramus Park	Interchange
Paramus	15.80	25.43		Ridgewood Avenue (CR 80) – Ridgewood, Oradell	Interchange; access to Fashion Center
Ridgewood	16.56	26.65		Linwood Avenue (CR 110) – Ridgewood	Interchange
Ridgewood	16.56	26.65		Van Emburgh Avenue (CR 71 north) – Washington Township, Hillsdale, Westwood	Northbound exit and entrance; interchange
Ridgewood	16.88	27.17		Paramus Road (CR 62 south) / East Saddle River Road (CR 75 north) – Ridgewood, Saddle River	Interchange
Ridgewood	17.54	28.23		Park & Ride – Airport Shuttle, Bus Terminal	Southbound exit and entrance; interchange
Ho-Ho-Kus	17.68	28.45		Race Track Road (CR 112) – Ho-Ho-Kus, Hillsdale, Westwood	Right-in/right-out connections only
Ho-Ho-Kus	18.33	29.50		Hollywood Avenue (CR 502) – Ho-Ho-Kus	Interchange
Waldwick	18.95	30.50		Sheridan Avenue (CR 77) – Saddle River, Waldwick, Ho-Ho-Kus	Interchange; Saddle River not signed southbound
Saddle River	20.50	32.99		Saddle River, Woodcliff Lake, Allendale	Interchange; access via CR 90
Ramsey	22.56	36.31		Upper Saddle River	Interchange; access via CR 81
Ramsey	22.56	36.31		Lake Street (CR S-81) – Ramsey	Interchange
Ramsey	23.55	37.90		Franklin Turnpike (CR 507) – Ramsey, Suffern	Interchange; Ramsey not signed northbound
Ramsey	23.91	38.48		Spring Street – Ramsey Route 17 station	Interchange
Mahwah	24.60	39.59		Island Road (CR 85) / North Central Avenue / MacArthur Boulevard	Interchange
Mahwah	25.55	41.12		West Ramapo Avenue (CR 100) – Mahwah, Pompton Lakes	Interchange
Mahwah	26.01	41.86		US 202 – Morristown, Suffern	Interchange
Mahwah	26.40	42.49		Mountainside Avenue / Crossroads Boulevard / Sharp Plaza	Interchange
Mahwah	26.40	42.49		Jaguar Land Rover Way – Local Traffic	Northbound exit only
Mahwah	26.65	42.89	Southern end of freeway section		
Mahwah	26.65	42.89	66	I-287 south – Morristown	Southern end of I-287 concurrency
Mahwah	27.20	43.77		I-87 / I-287 east / New York Thruway / NY 17 north – Albany, Governor Mario M. Cuomo Bridge, New York City	Northern end of I-287 concurrency; continuation into New York; exit 15 on I-87 / Thruway
1.000 mi = 1.609 km; 1.000 km = 0.621 mi: Concurrency terminus; Incomplete access
