= New Jersey Route 120 =

State highway in Bergen County, New Jersey, US

Route 120
- Larry Doby Highway; Paterson Plank Road

Route information
- Maintained by NJDOT
- Length: 2.65 mi (4.26 km)
- Existed: 1990s–present

Major junctions
- South end: I-95 Toll / N.J. Turnpike / Route 3 in East Rutherford
- CR 503 in East Rutherford
- North end: Route 17 / CR 120 in East Rutherford

Location
- Country: United States
- State: New Jersey
- Counties: Bergen

Highway system
- New Jersey State Highway Routes; Interstate; US; State; Scenic Byways
← Route 109	→ US 122

Route 120 is a state highway located in East Rutherford, Bergen County, New Jersey, United States. It extends 2.65 mi (4.26 km) from an interchange with Route 3 to another interchange with Route 17, where it continues to the west as County Route 120. Route 120 serves the Meadowlands Sports Complex - which consists of MetLife Stadium, Meadowlands Racetrack, the Meadowlands Arena, and the American Dream shopping and entertainment complex. It heads north from Route 3 as a six-lane freeway through the sports complex to an interchange with the southern terminus of County Route 503. From here, Route 120 heads northwest along the northern edge of the sports complex as a four-lane surface road known as Paterson Plank Road, passing through industrial and commercial areas.

In 1927, Route 3 was legislated along the Paterson Plank Road portion of present-day Route 120. It was eventually designated along the entire portion of current Route 120. In 1953, Route 3 was moved to its current freeway alignment, replacing Route S3, and a portion of Route 20 was designated to run from current Route 3 north to Paterson Plank Road while Paterson Plank Road was removed from the state highway system. The portion of Paterson Plank Road that lost its state highway status in 1953 gained it back in 1972, when it became an extension of Route 20 as a result of the construction of the Meadowlands Sports Complex. As this route was not connected to the mainline of Route 20, it was designated Route 120 by the 1990s. As a result of the construction of American Dream, the interchange between Route 3 and Route 120 was improved. An overpass between eastbound Route 3 and northbound Route 120 was completed in 2009 and a flyover from southbound Route 120 to eastbound Route 3 was completed in 2010.

== Route description ==
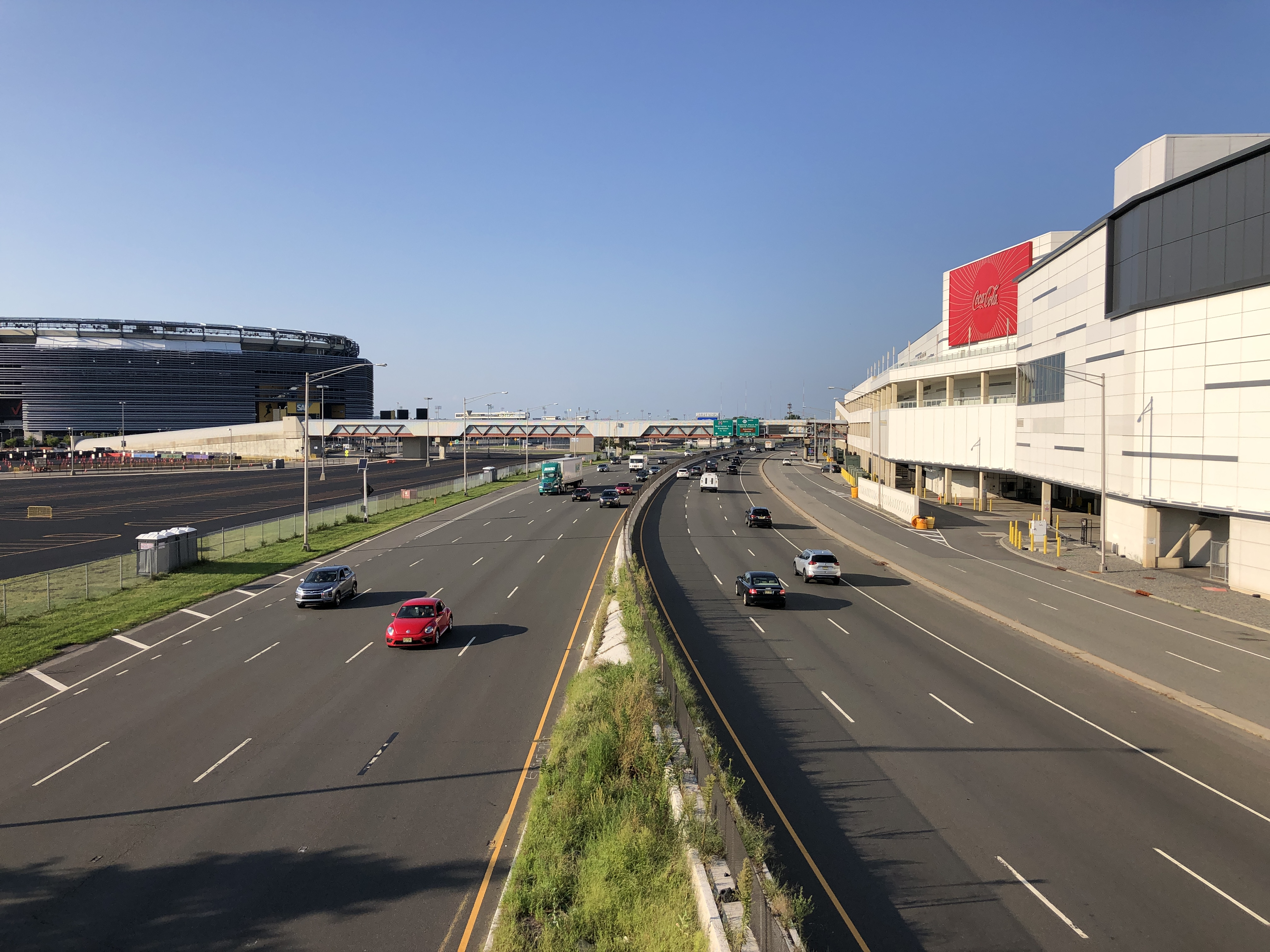
View northbound along Route 120 past Route 3 in East Rutherford. MetLife Stadium is on the left, and American Dream Meadowlands is on the right.

Route 120 begins at an interchange with the New Jersey Turnpike and Route 3, heading north-northeast on a six-lane freeway through the Meadowlands Sports Complex. Here, MetLife Stadium, home field of the New York Giants and New York Jets of the National Football League, and the Meadowlands station at the terminus of NJ Transit's Meadowlands Rail Line is on the west side of the road, while the closed Meadowlands Arena and the American Dream shopping and entertainment complex are on the east side of the road. There is an exit for an access road to the complex. The freeway comes to an end at an interchange where the road continues northeast into Moonachie as County Route 503 (Washington Avenue), while Route 120 exits onto Paterson Plank Road and heads northwest as a four-lane arterial road along the border of Carlstadt to the northeast and East Rutherford to the southwest.

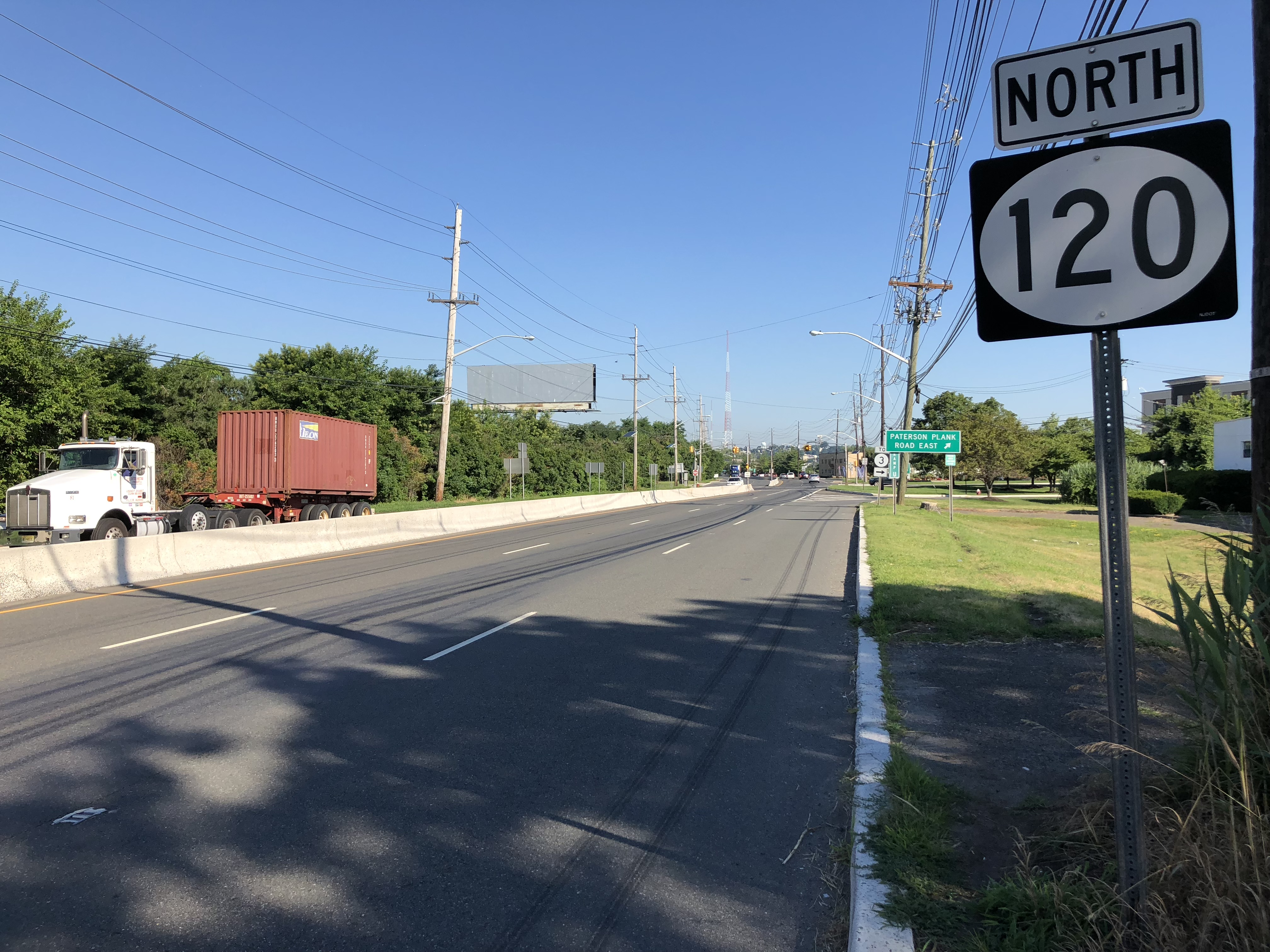
View northbound along Route 120 past CR 503 in East Rutherford

Route 120 passes one of Meadowlands Racetrack's grandstands and parallels NJ Transit's Meadowlands Rail Line on the East Rutherford side of the road, while commercial and industrial development dominates the Carlstadt side of the road, intersecting with Gotham Parkway. The route has a southbound exit and entrance to the Meadowlands Sports Complex before it crosses Berrys Creek. Upon crossing the creek, Route 120 continues northwest through more commercial and industrial development, intersecting with Murray Hill Parkway towards East Rutherford and 20th Street towards Carlstadt. A short distance past this intersection, the road becomes a four-lane undivided surface road that crosses over NJ Transit’s Pascack Valley Line before coming to an interchange with Route 17. Here, Route 120 terminates and County Route 120 continues to the west as Paterson Avenue.

=== County Route 120 ===
Bergen County Route 120, separate from State Route 120, is an east-west route that begins at its western point along the border between Bergen and Passaic Counties, and heads east. After crossing the Passaic River into Bergen County, the road is called Paterson Avenue in Wallington, and heads east through a residential and low-density commercial area. The road becomes the border between Wallington to the north and East Rutherford to the south. At the end of Wallington, Paterson Avenue is the border between Carlstadt and East Rutherford for a short distance but then the road dips into East Rutherford to avoid a hill (the bypass, which goes over the hill, is called Hoboken Road). The road returns to the Carlstadt/East Rutherford border at Route 17 which it crosses over via an overpass, and then meets up with the northern/western terminus of Route 120 and Paterson Plank Road. While the roadway is named Paterson Avenue and not Paterson Plank Road, CR 120 still a part of Paterson Plank Road and the original plans of the road from Paterson to New York City.

== History ==
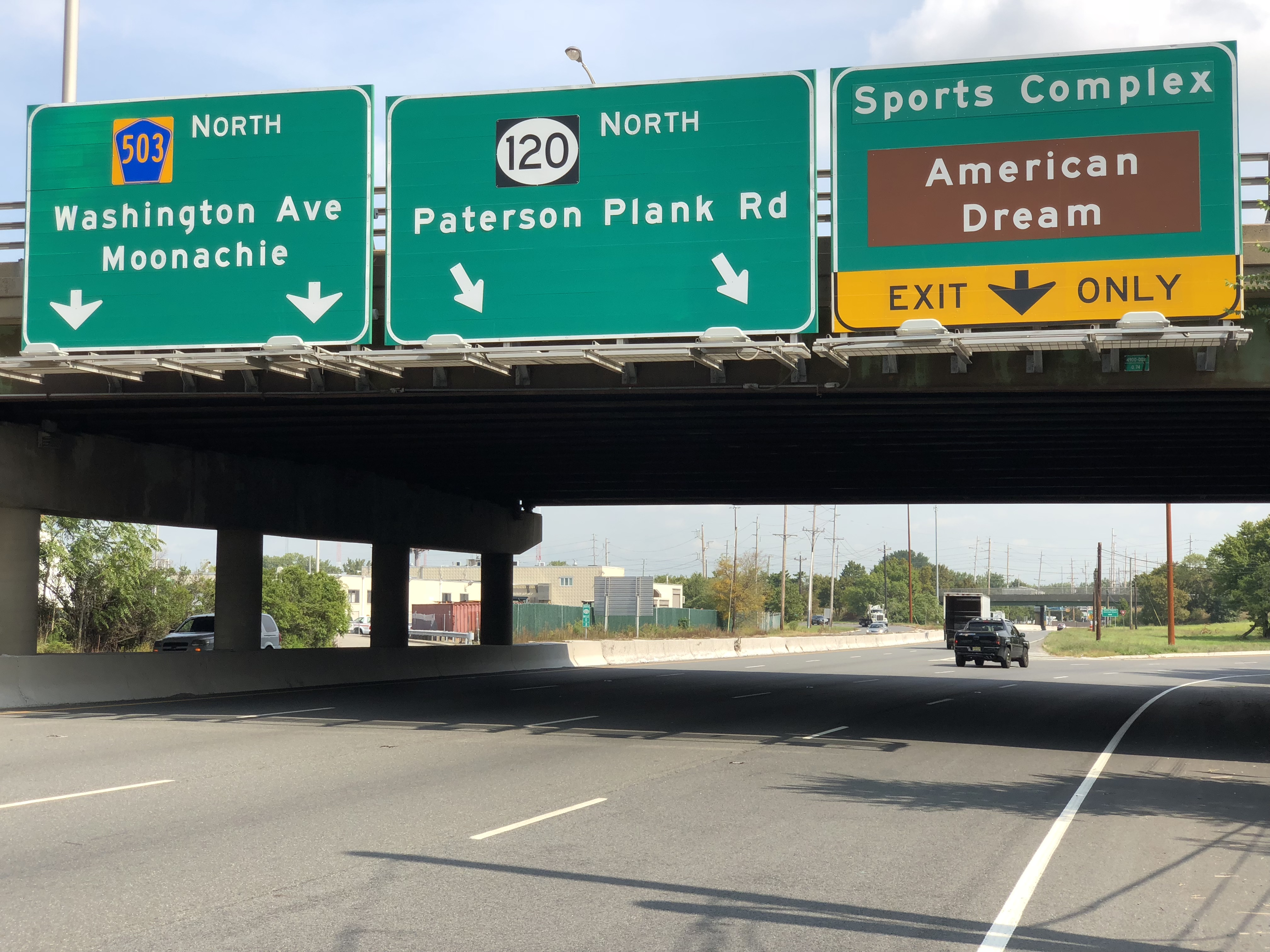
Route 120 northbound at the exit for CR 503 in East Rutherford

In the 1927 New Jersey state highway renumbering, Route 3 was legislated to run along the Paterson Plank Road portion of today’s Route 120 as part of its route between Secaucus and Greenwood Lake. By 1947, Route 3 had been designated along the entire alignment of current Route 120. When New Jersey renumbered its state highways in 1953, Route 3 was moved to a new freeway alignment that was Route S3. As a result of this realignment, the portion of the route between modern Route 3 and Paterson Plank Road became a portion of Route 20 while the section along Paterson Plank Road was removed from the state highway system. Paterson Plank Road between County Route 503 and Route 17 joined the state highway system again as an extension of this portion of Route 20 in 1972 when the Meadowlands Sports Complex was slated to be built. At this point, Route 20 had consisted of three disconnected segments. Since none of these segments were connected, this portion of road was redesignated Route 120 by the 1990s.

With the construction of American Dream, several improvements to Route 120 took place. The interchange with Route 3 was reconstructed with an overpass between eastbound Route 3 and northbound Route 120 that was completed in May 2009 at a cost of $38.1 million. Also, a flyover from southbound Route 120 to eastbound Route 3 was completed in early 2010 at a cost of $13 million.

By Joint Resolution No. 6, approved September 9, 1997, the New Jersey Legislature designated Route 120 in East Rutherford, where it runs through the Meadowlands Sports Complex, as the Larry Doby Highway. Former Paterson resident Larry Doby, a professional baseball player with the Newark Eagles of the Negro leagues, later played in the Cleveland Indians and was the first African American to break the color barrier in the American League.

== Major intersections ==
The entire route is in East Rutherford, Bergen County.

mi	km	Destinations	Notes
0.00	0.00	Route 3 to N.J. Turnpike south (I-95 Toll south) – Lincoln Tunnel, New York City	Southern terminus
0.2	0.32	Route 3 east to Meadowlands Parkway – Secaucus	Southbound exit only
0.2	0.32	Sports Complex, American Dream	Northbound exit only
0.27	0.43	N.J. Turnpike (I-95 Toll) / Route 3 west – Clifton	Southbound exit and northbound entrance; exit 16W on I-95 / Turnpike
0.74	1.19	Sports Complex, American Dream	Southbound exit and entrance; access via West Peripheral Road
1.03	1.66	CR 503 north (Washington Avenue) / Paterson Plank Road east – Moonachie, Sports Complex, American Dream	No southbound access to Sports Complex/American Dream; southern terminus of CR 503
1.03	1.66	Northern end of freeway section	
2.65	4.26	Route 17	Interchange
2.65	4.26	Paterson Avenue (CR 120 west)	Continuation west
1.000 mi = 1.609 km; 1.000 km = 0.621 mi: Incomplete access
