= Meadowlands Sports Complex =

Sports complex in New Jersey, U.S.

- The Meadowlands; The New Meadowlands; The Sports Complex
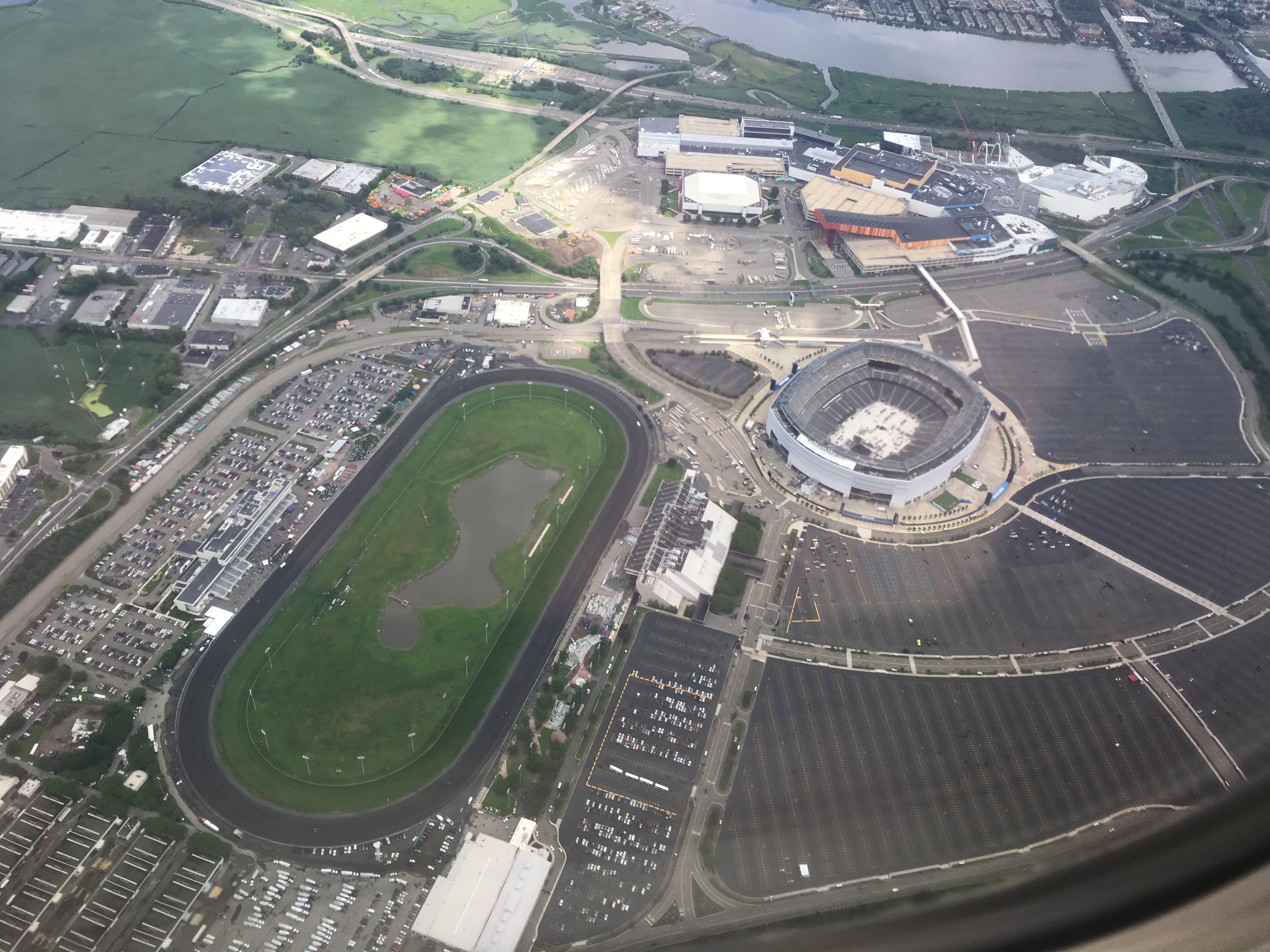
- Aerial view, 2018
- Interactive map of Meadowlands Sports Complex
- Address: East Rutherford, New Jersey; United States
- Coordinates: 40°48′51″N 74°04′26″W
- Owner: New Jersey Sports and Exposition Authority
- Facilities: MetLife Stadium; Meadowlands Racetrack; American Dream; Meadowlands Arena; Quest Diagnostics Training Center
- Public transit: Meadowlands (select events) Meadowlands Rail Line NJT Bus: 353 Coach USA: 351

The Meadowlands Sports Complex is a sports complex located in East Rutherford, New Jersey, United States. The facility is owned and operated by the New Jersey Sports and Exposition Authority (NJSEA). It is named for the New Jersey Meadowlands, upon which it was built.

The complex currently consists of MetLife Stadium, which is home to the New York Giants and New York Jets of the National Football League; the Meadowlands Racetrack, a famous harness racing circuit (which is home of the annual Hambletonian Stakes); and the Quest Diagnostics Training Center, which is the Giants' practice facility.

The complex is also home to the American Dream retail and entertainment venue, which was home to the Metropolitan Riveters of the Premier Hockey Federation, and the now-closed Meadowlands Arena, which served as a home for the New Jersey Devils of the National Hockey League, Seton Hall University's men's basketball team, and the team the arena was built for, the then-New Jersey Nets (now–Brooklyn Nets) of the National Basketball Association.

== History ==
In the mid-1960s, civic leaders in New Jersey began calling for a sports complex in the New Jersey Meadowlands that would be able to lure an NFL team from New York City. The New Jersey Sports and Exposition Authority Law was passed by the New Jersey Legislature in 1971 and signed by then–governor of New Jersey William T. Cahill. The first chairman of the NJSEA was David A. "Sonny" Werblin, former president of the NFL's New York Jets. By year's end, Werblin had secured a deal for the New York Giants, who were then playing in Yankee Stadium in the Bronx, to move to the Meadowlands. Ground was broken on Giants Stadium and the Meadowlands Racetrack on November 19, 1972.

To accommodate the new facility, access roads were improved. The New Jersey Turnpike, which had been suffering the burden of increased traffic volumes near its northern terminus in Ridgefield Park, built a new alignment, the "western spur", with an exit, interchange 16W, leading directly to the sports complex as well as to Route 3. Routes 3 and 20 (now 120) also received improvements.

On September 1, 1976, the Meadowlands Racetrack became the first complex venue to open, featuring harness racing. The track drew a capacity crowd of 42,133 for its initial date. Giants Stadium opened on October 10, 1976, as 76,042 fans watched the New York Giants lose to the Dallas Cowboys, 24–14.

By 1977, plans were in the works to expand the complex. A new arena was to be built on the opposite side of Route 20 from the stadium and racetrack, connected by vehicle ramps and a pedestrian bridge. Brendan Byrne Arena, named for the sitting governor, opened July 2, 1981, with the first of six sold-out shows by musician Bruce Springsteen. The arena was renamed for its corporate sponsor, Continental Airlines (now part of United Airlines), as Continental Airlines Arena, in early 1996, since the airline had a hub at nearby Newark Liberty International Airport. It was renamed again in 2007 for Izod as Izod Center. The first tenant in the arena was the New Jersey Nets in 1981. A year later, the New Jersey Devils of the NHL and the Seton Hall University men's basketball team joined the Nets.

The Nets played their first game at the arena on October 30, 1981, and lost to their cross-river rivals, the New York Knicks by a score of 103–99. The Devils played their first game on October 5, 1982, against the Pittsburgh Penguins. The game ended in a 3–3 tie.

The New York Jets moved to Giants Stadium on September 6, 1984, after playing at Shea Stadium for nearly 20 years. In their first game at the stadium on that day, the Jets lost 23–17 to the Pittsburgh Steelers in front of 70,564 fans.

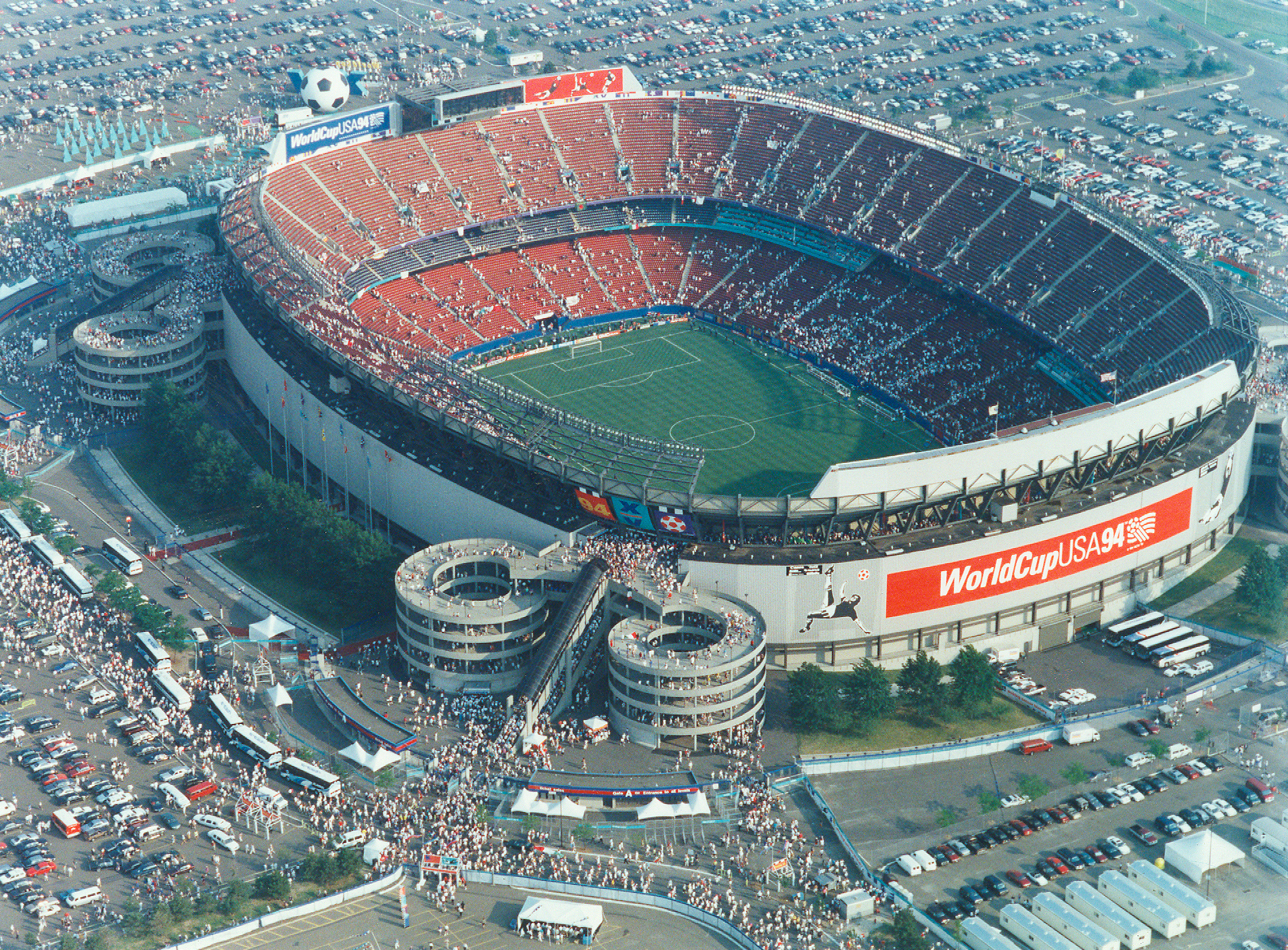
Giants Stadium during the 1994 FIFA World Cup.

In 2007, construction began on a mega-mall, named Meadowlands Xanadu. Work came to a halt in 2009, and Triple Five, owners of the Mall of America, took over the project in 2011. The construction was not complete until 2019.

The New Jersey Devils and Seton Hall Pirates left the complex when the Prudential Center was finished in 2007, followed by the New Jersey Nets, who moved there in 2010 to go to Prudential Center, then Brooklyn two years later, leaving the Izod Center devoid of a main tenant but free to host more concerts and events. Giants Stadium closed in at the end of the 2009 NFL season and demolition started immediately. In September 2010, MetLife Stadium, then known as New Meadowlands Stadium, opened for its first game. It was privately built and funded by the Jets and Giants. A commuter train line and a training center for the Giants also opened at the same time. MetLife bought the naming rights for the stadium and the entire complex in August 2011.

Meadowlands Arena closed in April 2015 to the public after suffering the loss of its major tenants and economic losses from other events. Since then, the arena has been used for concert rehearsals and private video productions. The former arena box offices are used as a station for the NJSEA EMS and the former Winner's Club lounge restaurant is the quarters for the New Jersey State Police.

MetLife Stadium hosted matches during the 2026 FIFA World Cup, including the final; it was the second time FIFA World Cup matches were played at the Meadowlands. Giants Stadium hosted matches during the 1994 FIFA World Cup.

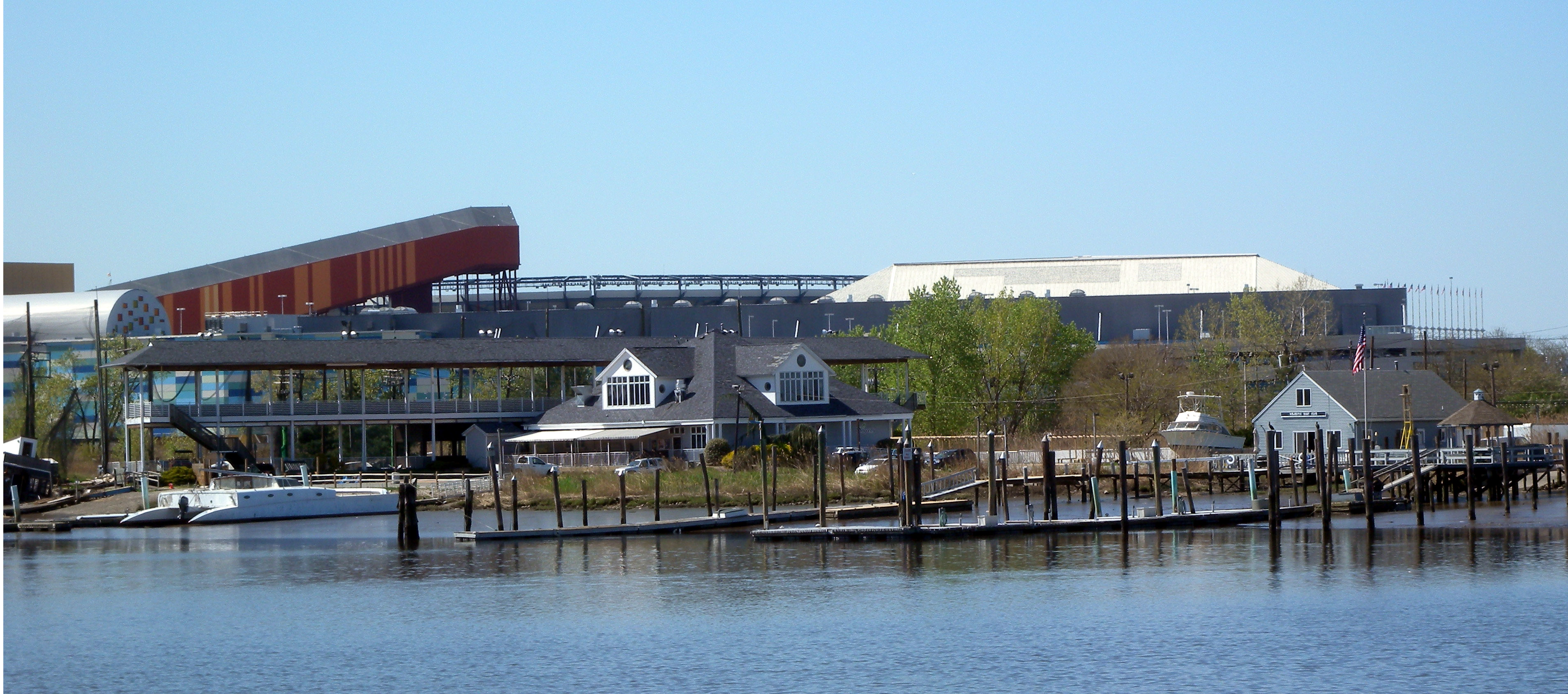
From Secaucus

In addition to the three venues, the complex also hosts events in the MetLife Stadium parking lot. State Fair Meadowlands (formerly called the Meadowlands Fair, and not affiliated with the New Jersey State Fair held annually in Sussex County) began in 1986 and has been operated by State Fair of Belleville since 2003. The parking lot is also the home of a twice-weekly flea market, which is canceled when the parking spaces are needed for stadium events.

The NJSEA hires in-house security and emergency medical services staff to serve the venues at the Sports Complex, including MetLife Stadium. Law enforcement is primarily provided by the New Jersey State Police Sports Complex Unit.

The Meadowlands has been proposed as a potential location for a future casino in the event that voters approve a measure allowing it.

== Venues ==
=== MetLife Stadium ===
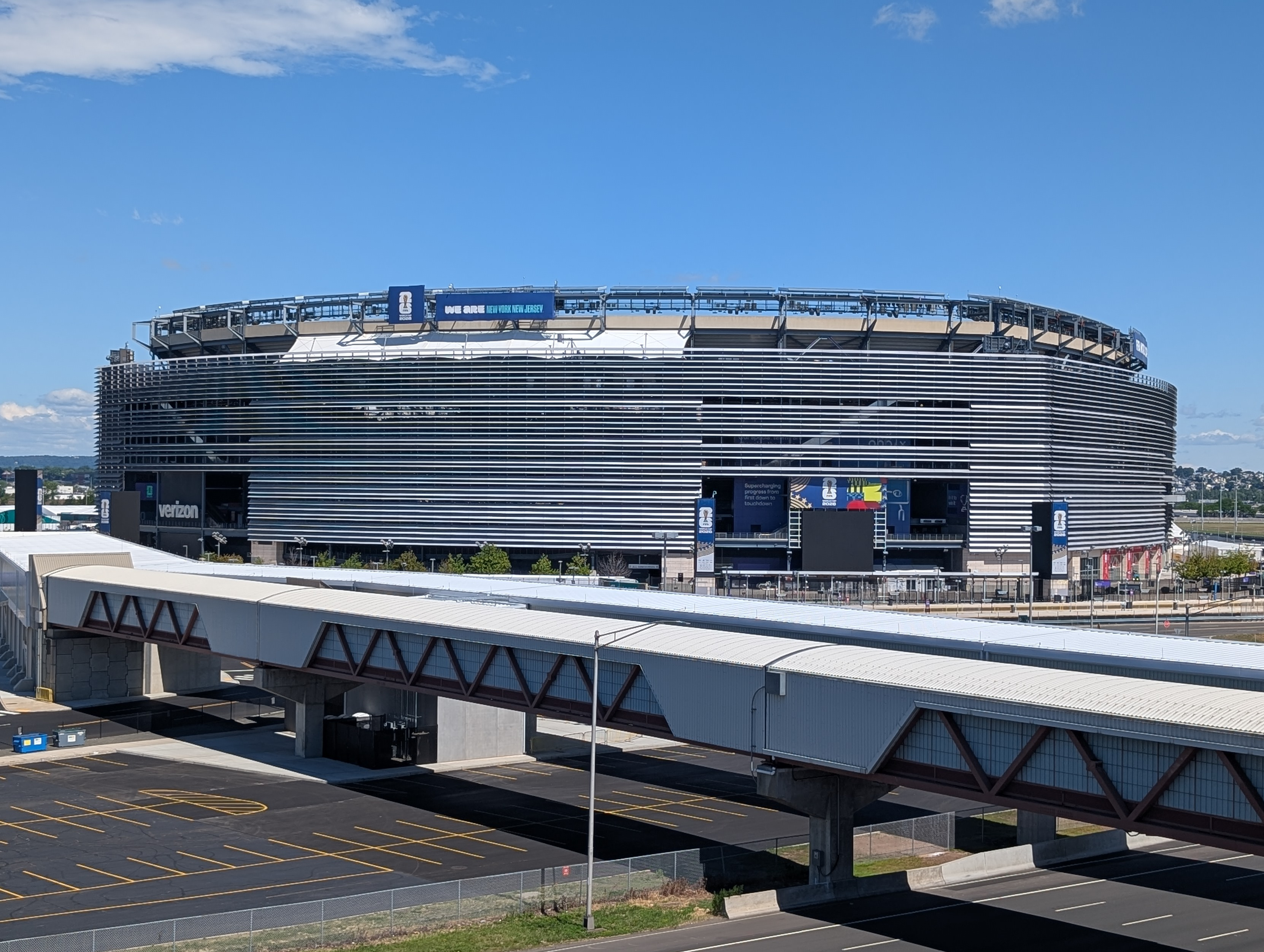
MetLife Stadium as seen during the 2026 FIFA World Cup.

MetLife Stadium opened in 2010, following the closing and demolition of the Giants' and the Jets' previous home, Giants Stadium. It is the home stadium for the New York Giants and New York Jets of the NFL and is one of two stadiums home to two NFL franchises (SoFi Stadium in Inglewood, California is the other). It was the home of the New York Guardians of the XFL, MetLife Stadium hosted Super Bowl XLVIII in 2014 and hosted matches during the 2026 FIFA World Cup, including the final.

=== Meadowlands Arena (former) ===
Meadowlands Arena (formerly Brendan Byrne Arena, Continental Airlines Arena and IZOD Center) was a multi-purpose indoor arena. Opened in 1981, it was home to the New Jersey Nets NBA team until 2010, the Seton Hall University men's basketball team until 2007 and to the New Jersey Devils of the National Hockey League until 2007. The Devils and the Seton Hall men's basketball team moved to the Prudential Center in Newark. The renamed Brooklyn Nets currently now play at the Barclays Center. It closed early in April 2015.

=== Meadowlands Racetrack ===
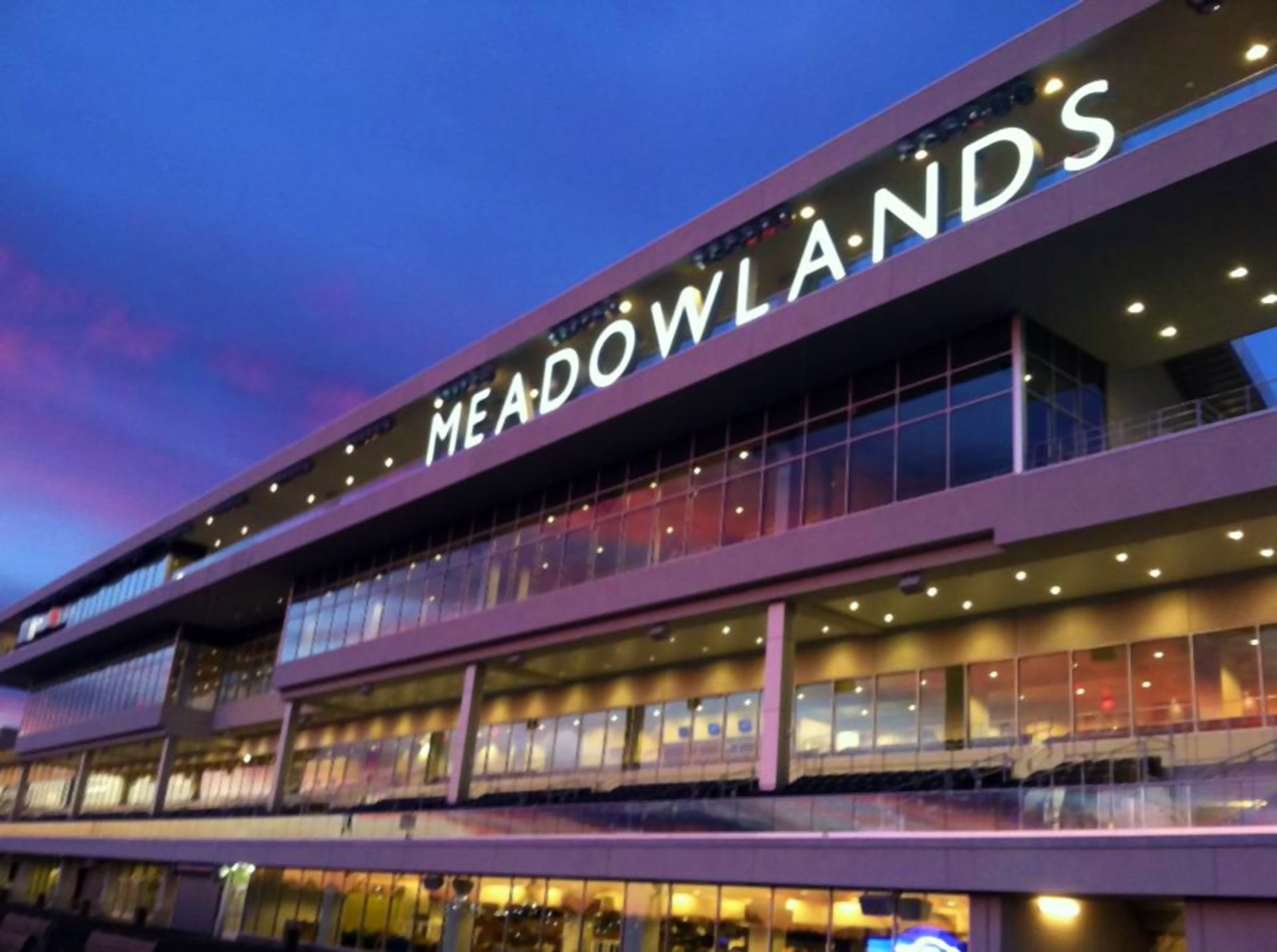
The Meadowlands Racetrack as seen in 2017

The Meadowlands Racetrack is a horse racing track that hosts both thoroughbred racing and harness racing. It is known popularly in the region as "The Big M".

Opened in the mid-1970s, the Meadowlands Racetrack held its first harness race on September 1, 1976, while thoroughbred racing commenced on September 6, 1977. The Racetrack is the site of the Hambletonian, the most prestigious event in standardbred racing. The track is equipped to race at night, when most of its races are.

In the middle of the track is a lake, intended to resemble the state of New Jersey. The Meadowlands Racetrack is also one of the leading simulcast facilities in the world in terms of total handle.

=== Quest Diagnostics Training Center ===
The Quest Diagnostics Training Center is the main headquarters and practice facility of the New York Giants. It was known as the Timex Performance Center, renamed in July 2013 when the Giants and Quest Diagnostics announced a new partnership after the four-year partnership between the Giants and Timex ended. The facility, on the westernmost portion of the Meadowlands Sports Complex grounds, opened in 2010 and replaced the old Giants' practice fields and headquarters, adjacent to Giants Stadium. The Giants annually host Training Camp at the facility in the summers, including practices open to the public with fan activities and legend player meet-and-greet opportunities. Parking for Training Camp is in Lot K.

=== American Dream ===
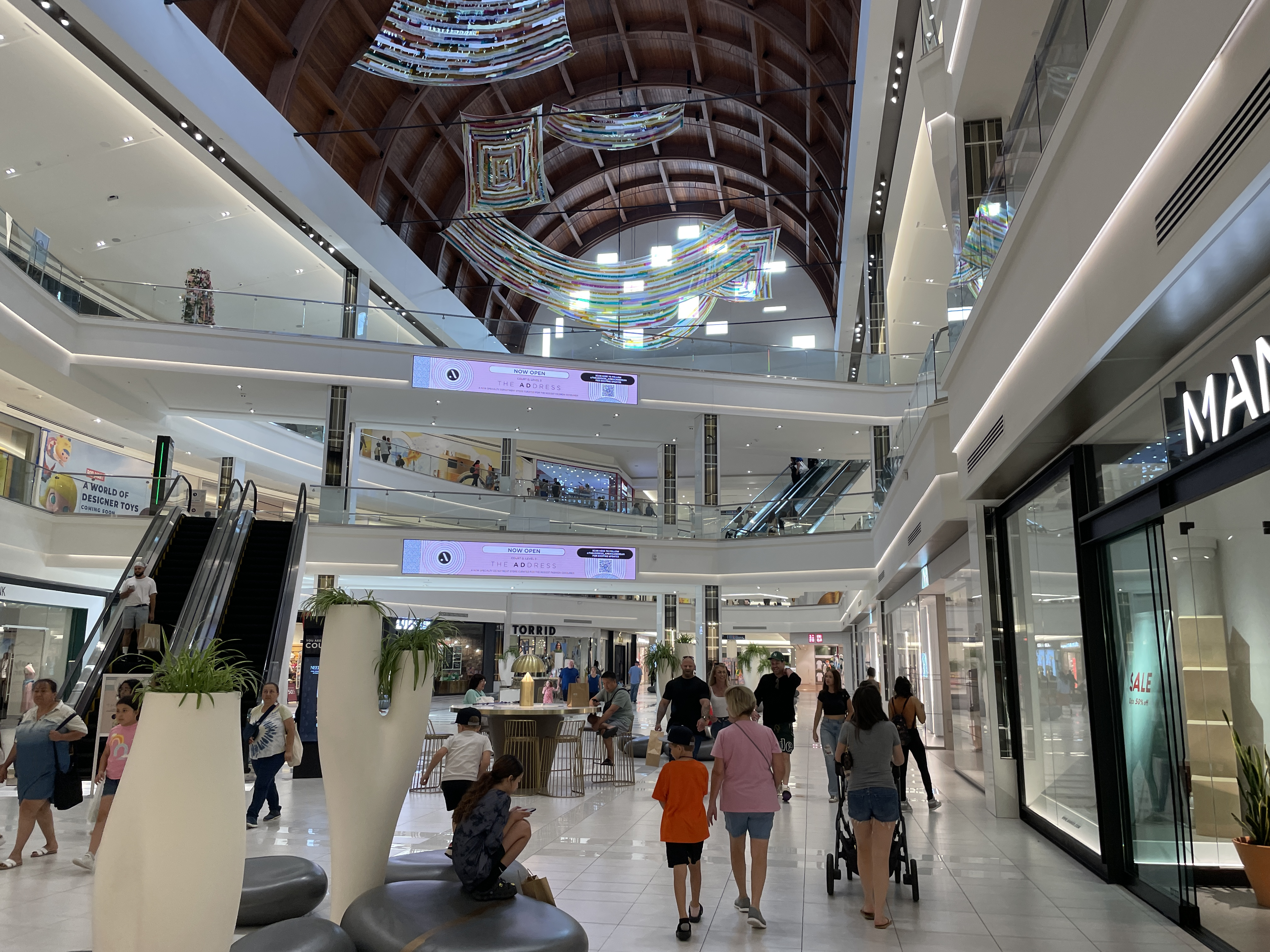
Inside the American Dream shopping mall

American Dream is a large mall and entertainment complex. Formerly known as Xanadu, the project resides within the Meadowlands Sports Complex adjacent to the Izod Center that has over 450 stores. The first of four opening stages occurred on October 25, 2019, with the other stages opening on a staggered schedule on October 1, 2020.

Only 45 percent of American Dream's space is devoted to retail locations. The stores will include six anchor retail tenants with more than 50,000 square feet (4,600 m^{2}) each, 12 major retailers with 20,000 to 50,000 square feet (1,900 to 4,600 m^{2}) each, and 339 smaller shops of up to 20,000 square feet (1,900 m^{2}). It will include more than 100 eateries, as well as a 38,000 square feet (3,500 m^{2}), 18-vendor food court with a kosher food hall.

The other 55 percent of the space contains entertainment facilities. The amusement facilities include or will include an indoor NHL-sized ice rink, an indoor theme park called Nickelodeon Universe, an indoor water park called DreamWorks Water Park, and a concert/performing arts venue with 2,400 to 3,000 seats. Other attractions include the Big SNOW American Dream indoor ski slope, two miniature 18-hole golf courses, a CMX Cine’Bistro dine-in luxury movie theater, a family entertainment center, a bowling alley, a Legoland Discovery Center, a Sea Life Aquarium, an indoor rock climbing facility, and a Mirror Maze attraction. It also includes a kosher food court, with kosher options ranging from ice cream to pizza to fast food chicken.

On September 14, 2022, the Metropolitan Riveters of the Premier Hockey Federation became tenants of The Rink at the American Dream for at least the next three years.

=== Concerts and entertainment ===
In addition to serving as a hub for professional and collegiate sports, the Meadowlands Sports Complex has long been a major venue for concerts, large-scale shows, and cultural events. Giants Stadium, during its existence from 1976 to 2010, hosted internationally renowned performers including Bruce Springsteen, the Rolling Stones, U2, and Bon Jovi. Springsteen, a New Jersey native, performed dozens of concerts at the venue and held the record for the most shows by a single artist at the stadium.

MetLife Stadium, which opened in 2010, continues that tradition and has hosted some of the highest-grossing concert tours in the world, including multi-night residencies by Taylor Swift, Beyoncé, and Coldplay. The stadium has also been the site of international events such as WrestleMania 29 in 2013 and WrestleMania 35 in 2019.

The Izod Center, active from 1981 until its closure in 2015, was also a prominent stop on national and international concert tours, hosting artists ranging from Madonna and Michael Jackson to Jay-Z. In addition to concerts, the arena regularly presented family entertainment shows such as Disney on Ice, Ringling Bros. and Barnum & Bailey Circus, and the Harlem Globetrotters.

The complex has also been the site of notable cultural gatherings, including Pope John Paul II's mass at Giants Stadium in 1995, which drew tens of thousands of attendees.

== Access ==
=== Meadowlands station ===
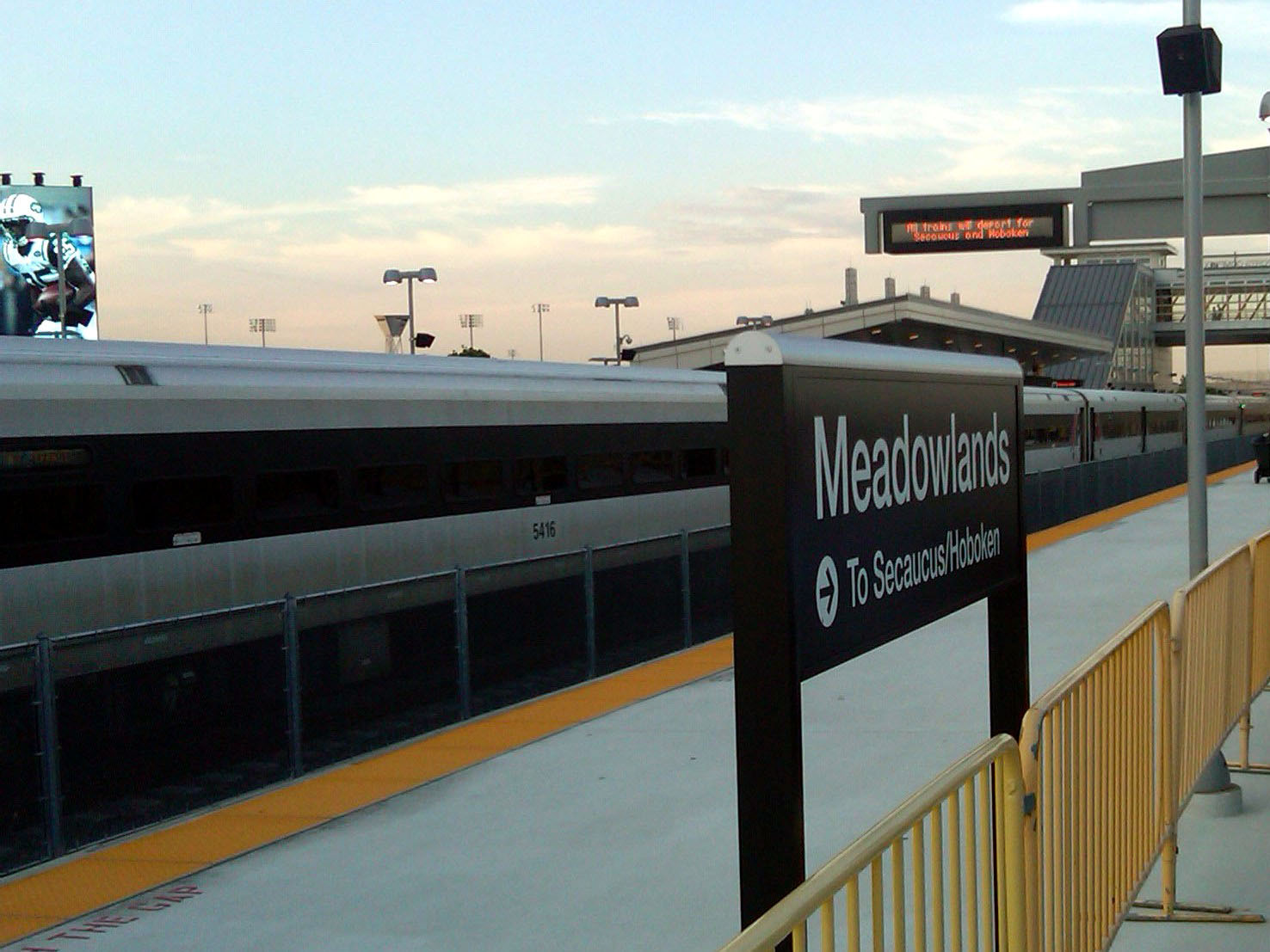
The Meadowlands NJ Transit station

New Jersey Transit operates the Meadowlands station at the complex, the terminus of the Meadowlands Rail Line. In preparation for the opening of the American Dream mall, the station opened for service on July 26, 2009. Studies are also underway about an extension of the Hudson–Bergen Light Rail line to the MetLife Sports Complex. Despite the opening of American Dream in 2019, the rail line is currently not being used daily.

=== Road access ===
The Meadowlands Sports Complex is primarily surrounded by four main highways: New Jersey Route 3 to the south, Route 17 to the west, Route 120 (also called Paterson Plank Road) to the north, and the New Jersey Turnpike (Interstate 95) to the east. The Turnpike interchanges with Route 3 near the south side of the complex, giving access from that point, and also has a direct southbound exit/northbound entrance at the north side. Route 120 starts at Route 3 near the southeast corner, runs straight through the complex, giving direct exits to certain parking lots east of MetLife Stadium, then turns west to connect back with Route 17, while also giving access from Washington Avenue (CR 503). Routes 3 and 17 also connect to numerous local roads as well. Route 3 also connects to the Garden State Parkway further west, and the Lincoln Tunnel further east, while the Turnpike/I-95 give access to and from the George Washington Bridge northwards, and Newark Airport southwards.

== Auto racing ==
In 1983, a Formula One auto race was planned for the New York City area. A temporary street circuit at the Meadowlands Sports Complex was one of the finalists for the location. A course at Flushing Meadows Park, in the New York City borough of Queens, was chosen, but the event was canceled before the first running.

In July 1984, the CART IndyCar series held the first Meadowlands Grand Prix on a temporary circuit built in the Giants Stadium parking lot. The race was only moderately successful, and crowds were mediocre at best. In 1988, the course layout was moved to the streets surrounding Brendan Byrne Arena and redesigned to a 1.2-mile (1.9 km), six-turn layout in an effort to improve competition. The race continued until 1991, and crowds continued to stay away.

From 1988 to 1991, the race was part of the Marlboro Million, a cash prize to be awarded to any driver who won the Marlboro Grand Prix, the Marlboro 500, and the Marlboro Challenge All-Star event in the same year. The prize was never won. In 1992, race officials announced plans to move the race to Manhattan, using a street course at the World Trade Center. Within a few months, however, the race was canceled because of cost concerns.

In the early 2000s, conceptual plans were drafted to build a NASCAR-style speedway at the Meadowlands Sports Complex as part of a revitalizing project. However, the plan was rejected and abandoned.

== Tenants ==
=== MetLife Stadium ===
- New York Giants (NFL)
- New York Jets (NFL)

=== The Rink at American Dream ===
- Metropolitan Riveters (PHF)

=== Former Metlife Stadium tenants ===
- New York Guardians (XFL) (2020)

=== Former Giants Stadium tenants ===
- New York Giants (NFL)
- New York Jets (NFL)
- New York Cosmos (NASL) (1977–84)
- New Jersey Generals (USFL) (1983–85)
- New York/New Jersey Knights (WLAF) (1991–92)
- New York Red Bulls (MLS) (1995–2009) (moved to Sports Illustrated Stadium in Harrison)
- New York/New Jersey Hitmen (XFL) (2001)

=== Former Meadowlands Arena tenants ===
- New Jersey Nets (NBA) (1981–2010) (moved to Prudential Center in Newark from 2010 to 2012 and then moved to the Barclays Center in Brooklyn as the Brooklyn Nets.)
- New Jersey Rockets (1981–1982) (MISL)
- New York Cosmos (1981–1985) (NASL Indoor/MISL)
- New Jersey Devils (NHL) (1982–2007) (moved to Prudential Center in Newark)
- Seton Hall University Men's Basketball (NCAA) (1981–2007) (moved to Prudential Center in Newark)
- New Jersey Saints (NLL) (1987–1988) (moved to Nassau Coliseum in Uniondale, New York as the New York Saints)
- New Jersey Red Dogs/Gladiators (AFL) (1997–2002) (moved to Las Vegas)
- New Jersey Rockin' Rollers (Roller Hockey International) (1995–1997)
- New Jersey Storm (NLL) (2002–2003) (moved to Anaheim)
- New Jersey XTreme (NIFL) (2005)
