= Thriller =

Thriller most often refers to:

- Thriller (genre), a broad genre of literature, film and television
  - Thriller film, a film genre under the general thriller genre

Thriller may also refer to:

== Music ==
- Thriller (album), 1982, by Michael Jackson
  - "Thriller" (song), by Michael Jackson
  - Thriller 25, a 2008 special 25th anniversary edition of the Jackson album
  - Michael Jackson's Thriller (music video), 1983
    - Thriller jacket, a jacket worn by Jackson in the music video
  - "Thriller" (viral video), a 2007 video featuring prison inmates in Cebu, Philippines recreating the dance from Michael Jackson's music video
  - Thriller – Live, a 2009 musical featuring the music of the Jackson 5 and Michael Jackson
  - Thriller 40, a 2022 special 40th anniversary edition of the Jackson album
- Thriller (Cold Blood album) (1973)
- Thriller (Eddie and the Hot Rods album) (1979)
- Thriller (Lambchop album) (1997)
- Thriller (Swoop album) (1993)
- Thriller (EP), 2013, by BtoB
- Thr!!!er, a 2013 album by !!!
- Thriller, a 2000s American rock band featuring Jeremy Bolm
- Thriller, a 1982 album by Killer
- Thriller, a 2009 album by Part Chimp
- "Thriller", a song by Fall Out Boy from Infinity on High

== Comics ==
- Thriller (DC Comics), a comic book series published 1983–84 by DC Comics in the US
- Thriller Comics, later known as Thriller Comics Library and Thriller Picture Library, a series of comics published by Amalgamated Press/Fleetway in the UK from 1951 to 1963
- Boris Karloff Thriller, a comic published by Gold Key Comics in 1962

== Films ==
- Thriller – A Cruel Picture, 1973, by Bo Arne Vibenius
- The Thriller, a 2010 Indian film
- Thriller (2018 film), a slasher horror film starring Mykelti Williamson and RZA
- Thriller, 1979, by Sally Potter
- Thriller 40 (film), a 2023 documentary about Michael Jackson
- Sing: Thriller, a 2024 animated short film from Illumination, based on the music video from Michael Jackson

== Television ==
- Thriller (British TV series) (1973–1976), an anthology television series
- Thriller (American TV series) (1960–1962), an anthology television series hosted by Boris Karloff

== Roller coasters ==
- Thriller (roller coaster) or Tsunami
- The Thriller (roller coaster)
- Thriller (Land of Make Believe)

== Other uses ==
- Thriller Manju (born 1972), Indian film actor, martial artist, director, screenwriter, stunt coordinator, and choreographer
- Thriller (short story collection), 2006, edited by James Patterson
- The Thriller, a magazine published in the 1910s, which reprinted stories from The Black Cat and possibly other sources

== See also ==
- Thrill (disambiguation)
- Triller (disambiguation)
