= Trill =

Trill most often refers to:

- Trill (music), a type of musical ornament
- Trill consonant, a type of sound used in some languages

Trill may also refer to:

== Fictional entities ==
- Trill (Star Trek), a humanoid species capable of hosting a symbiont being in the Star Trek universe
- Trill, the main character in Captive
- Trill, an infant NetNavi from MegaMan NT Warrior

== Music ==
- Trill (album), an album by rapper Bun B
- II Trill, the second solo album from Bun B
- "Trill", a song by Mami Kawada off the album Savia
- "Trill", a song by Clipse off the Hell Hath No Fury album
- Trill Entertainment, a record label

== Other uses ==
- Trill Williams (born 1999), American football player
- TRILL, Transparent Interconnection of Lots of Links
- Trill, an Australian bird food maker, and division of Mars, Incorporated

== See also ==
- Thrill (disambiguation)
- Triller (disambiguation)
