= McLean Boulevard =

McLean Boulevard may refer to:

- McLean Boulevard (Baltimore)
- New Jersey Route 20
