= Thrill =

Thrill or Thrilling may refer to:

== Film and TV ==
- Thrill (TV channel), a Southeast Asian movie channel
- Thrill (1941 film), an Italian mystery thriller film
- Thrill (2008 film), an Indian Malayalam-language film
- Thrilling (film), a 1965 Italian comedy film
- Thrill, a 1996 made-for-TV movie by Sam Pillsbury

== Music ==
- Thrill, a 2000 album by Eleni Mandell
- "Thrill", a 1995 song by Tomoyasu Hotei
- "Thrill", a song by Band-Maid from the 2015 album New Beginning
- "Thrill", a song by Future Islands from the 2020 album As Long As You Are
- "The Thrill", a 2020 single by Wiz Khalifa and Empire of the Sun

== Other uses ==
- Thrilling (company), an online marketplace for vintage clothing
- Vegas Thrill, a professional volleyball team
- Thrill, a 1995 novel by Robert Byrne
- Thrill!, a 1998 novel by Jackie Collins
- Thrill, a discontinued Procter & Gamble brand of dishwashing liquid
- Thrill, a quality of a heart murmur

== See also ==
- Thrills (disambiguation)
- Thriller (disambiguation)
- Thrillseeker (disambiguation)
