= Thrillseeker =

Thrillseeker may refer to:

== Film and television ==
- Thrill Seekers, a television series hosted by Chuck Connors
- Thrill Seekers (film), a 1999 science fiction movie
- The Thrill Seekers, a 1927 American silent film
- The Yellow Teddy Bears, a 1963 British film released as The Thrill Seekers in the US
- Hot and Naked, also known as Thrill Seekers, a 1974 French film
- Thrillseekers, an animated short on Cartoon Network

== Music ==
- Thrill Seeker, an album by August Burns Red
- Thrill Seeker (EP), 2020 extended play by Sub Urban
- "Thrillseeker", a song by The Divine Comedy from the 1998 album Fin de Siècle
- The Thrillseekers, English trance DJ

== Other ==
- Thrillseeker (roller coaster), a defunct steel roller coaster at Sea World, Australia
- Adrenaline junkie, one who appears to favor stressful activities

== See also ==
- Extreme sport
- Thrill (disambiguation)
