= Triller (disambiguation) =

Triller is a group of birds of the cuckoo-shrike family belonging to the genus Lalage.

Triller may also refer to:

- Triller, German term for a trill in music
- Triller (company), the company that owns the Triller app
  - Triller (app), social media app

== See also ==
- Thriller (disambiguation)
- Trill (disambiguation)
