= New Jersey Route 19 =

State highway in Passaic County, New Jersey, US

Route 19
- Paterson Peripheral

Route information
- Maintained by NJDOT and Passaic County
- Length: 3.04 mi (4.89 km)
- Existed: 1988–present

Major junctions
- South end: G.S. Parkway / US 46 / CR 509 in Clifton
- I-80 in Paterson
- North end: CR 509 in Paterson

Location
- Country: United States
- State: New Jersey
- Counties: Passaic

Highway system
- New Jersey State Highway Routes; Interstate; US; State; Scenic Byways
← Route 18N	→ Route 20

Route 19 is a state highway in Passaic County, New Jersey, United States. Also referred to as the Paterson Peripheral, it runs 3.04 mi (4.89 km) from an intersection with County Route 509 (CR 509, Broad Street) and CR 609 (Colfax Avenue) in Clifton north to another intersection with CR 509 (Main Street) in downtown Paterson. Between U.S. Route 46 (US 46) in Clifton and Interstate 80 (I-80) in Paterson, Route 19 is a freeway. The main purpose of the route is to connect the Garden State Parkway to I-80 and downtown Paterson. The road was originally proposed as the Paterson spur of the Garden State Parkway that was to run north to Wayne. In 1959, it was planned to become part of the Paterson Peripheral, an extension of Route 20 from downtown Paterson. By 1971, the road was completed between the Garden State Parkway and I-80, at which time it received the Route 20 designation; the rest was cancelled in 1978 due to feared community disruption. In 1988, this portion of Route 20 became Route 19 as it did not connect with the other segment of the route. In the 1990s, Route 19 was extended to Main Street in downtown Paterson as part of a project that also completed the interchange with I-80.

== Route description ==
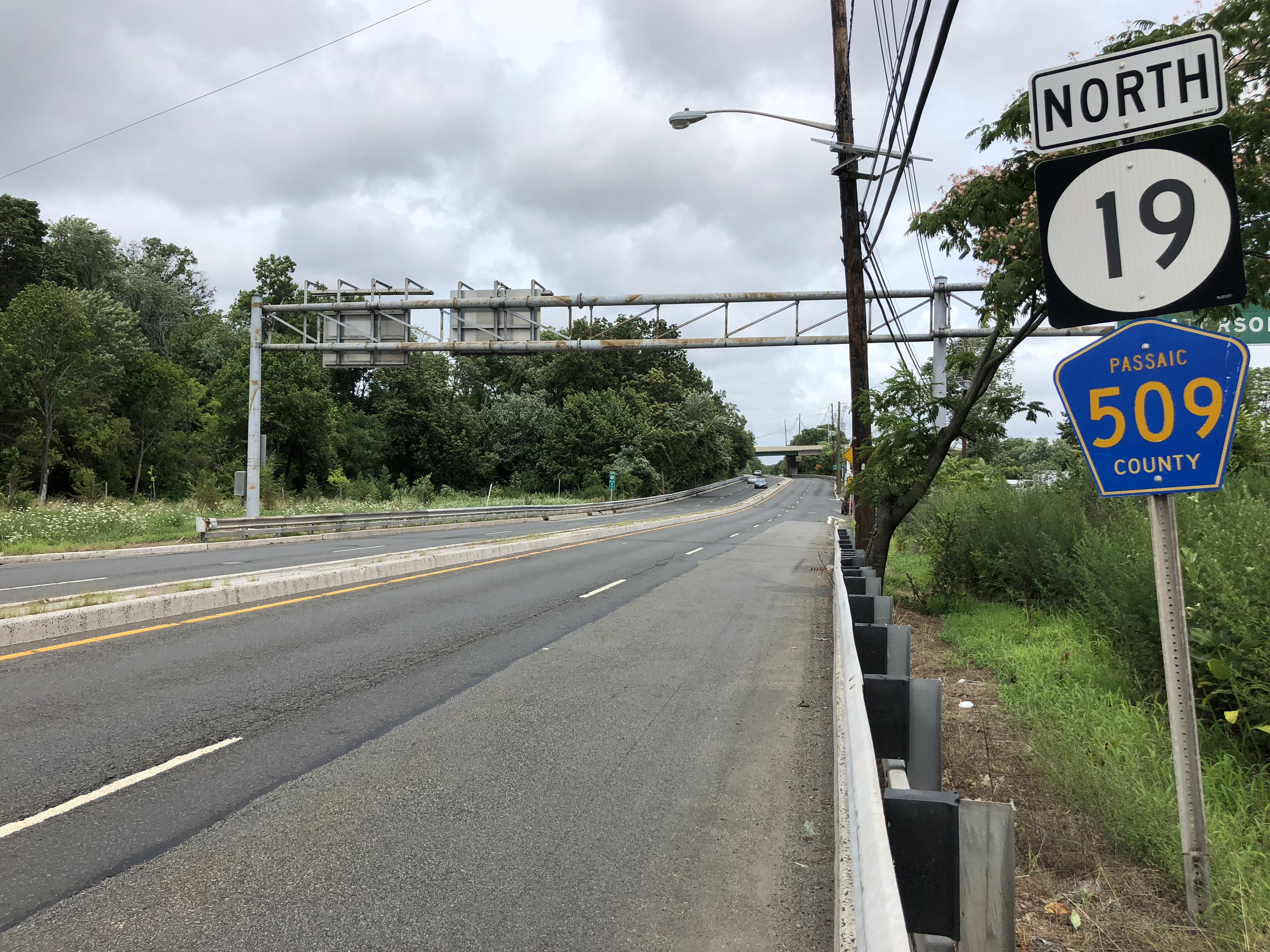
View north along Route 19 and CR 509 just north of US 46 in Clifton

Route 19 begins at the intersection of CR 509 (Broad Street) and CR 609 (Colfax Avenue) in Clifton. From this intersection, it heads north concurrent with CR 509 as a four-lane freeway, soon interchanging with US 46. Past US 46, the road crosses a brook and CR 509 (Broad Street) splits off, with Route 19 interchanging with the Garden State Parkway. Route 19 continues past the Garden State Parkway as a six-lane freeway surrounded by trees, coming to a northbound exit and southbound entrance with CR 509.

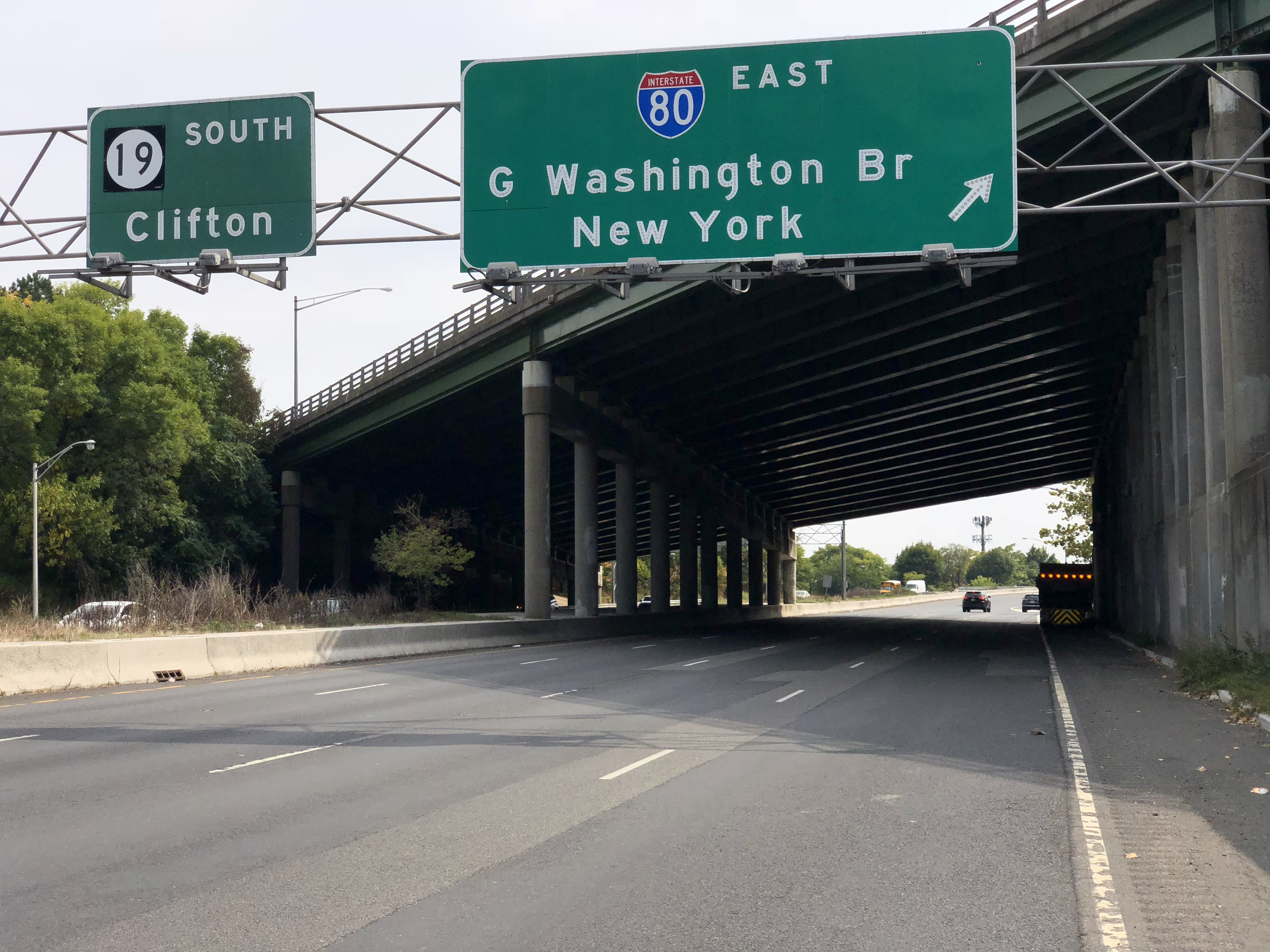
Route 19 southbound at I-80 interchange in Paterson

Past this interchange, the road heads into Paterson. Here, the route has a southbound exit and northbound entrance with CR 621 (Valley Road) before becoming an eight-lane freeway and passing to the east of Garret Mountain Reservation. After interchanging with I-80, Route 19 continues north as a five-lane freeway, with three northbound lanes and two southbound lanes, to an interchange with CR 638 (Grand Street). From here, the route becomes a four-lane arterial road and heads into urbanized areas of downtown Paterson. The route turns east and becomes a county-maintained surface road at the intersection with Marshall Street and continues to its northern terminus at the intersection of CR 509 (Main Street) and Ward Street.

== History ==
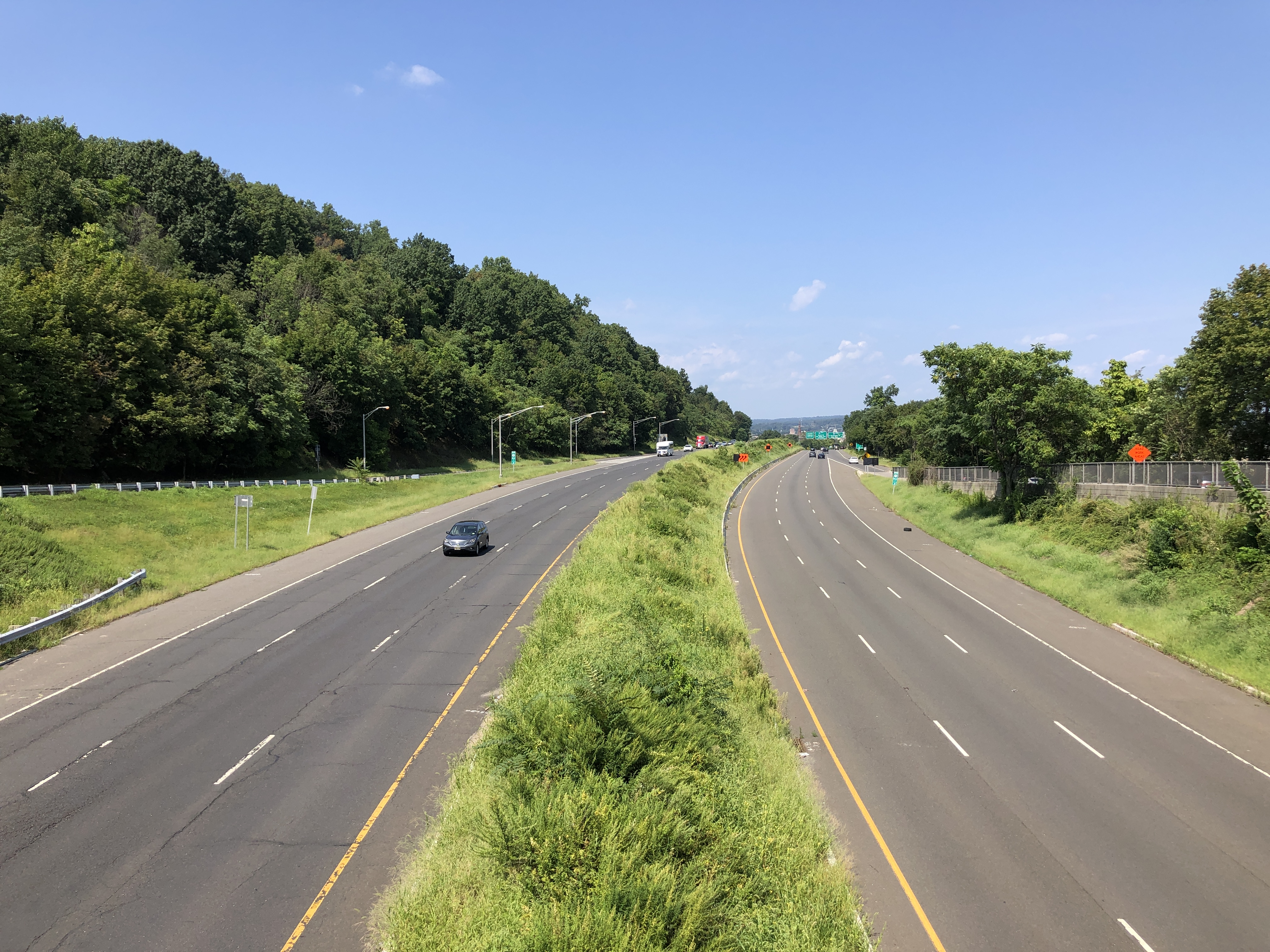
Route 19 northbound at CR 621 in Paterson

What is now Route 19 was once planned as the Paterson spur of the Garden State Parkway, which was to run through Paterson and Haledon to CR 504 in Wayne. The planned Paterson spur would become an extension of Route 20 in 1959. This road, which was to be a six-lane, $58 million freeway called the Paterson Peripheral, was to run from Clifton north to the existing Route 20 in downtown Paterson. This road was completed between the Garden State Parkway and Valley Road by 1969 and north to I-80 in 1975. Upon completion, this road received the Route 20 designation. The extension to Route 20 through Paterson was stopped in 1971 because of the designation of the Great Falls Historic District, a historical district recognizing Paterson’s heritage as an industrial center. By the 1990s, this portion of Route 20 was redesignated Route 19 as it did not connect with the mainline of the route. In 1992, a project to complete the interchange with I-80 and extend the route to Main Street in downtown Paterson to ease congestion was finished. This interchange received the Prize Bridge Award in the category of Grade Separation from the American Institute of Steel Construction in 1996.

== Major intersections ==
The entire route is in Passaic County.

Location	mi	km	Destinations	Notes
Clifton	0.00	0.00	CR 509 south (Broad Street)	Continuation south; southern end of CR 509 concurrency
Clifton	0.13	0.21	US 46 east	No southbound exit
Clifton	0.13	0.21	US 46 west – Dover	Southbound exit and northbound entrance
Clifton	0.46	0.74	CR 509 north (Broad Street)	Northbound exit and southbound entrance; northern end of CR 509 concurrency
Clifton	0.50	0.80	G.S. Parkway south	Southbound exit and northbound entrance; exit 155A on G.S. Parkway
Clifton	1.15	1.85	Broad Street (CR 509) – Clifton	Northbound exit and southbound entrance
Paterson	1.50	2.41	Main Street (CR 601) / Valley Road (CR 621) – Clifton	Southbound exit and northbound entrance
Paterson	2.46	3.96	I-80 – Delaware Water Gap, George Washington Bridge, New York	No southbound access to I-80 west; exits 57A-B on I-80
Paterson	2.71	4.36	Grand Street (CR 638)	Northbound exit and southbound entrance
Paterson	2.84	4.57	I-80 west / Spruce Street	Southbound exit and entrance; access via Oliver Street
Paterson	2.84	4.57	Northern end of freeway section	
Paterson	3.04	4.89	CR 509 (Main Street)	Northern terminus
1.000 mi = 1.609 km; 1.000 km = 0.621 mi: Concurrency terminus; Incomplete access
