= Interstate 80 in New Jersey =

Highway in New Jersey

Interstate 80
- I-80 highlighted in red

Route information
- Maintained by NJDOT and DRJTBC
- Length: 68.54 mi (110.30 km)
- Existed: 1958–present
- History: Completed in 1973
- NHS: Entire route

Major junctions
- West end: I-80 at the Pennsylvania state line in Delaware Water Gap, PA
- US 46 / Route 94 in Knowlton Township; US 206 / Route 183 in Roxbury; Route 15 in Wharton; I-287 / US 46 in Parsippany–Troy Hills; I-280 / US 46 in Parsippany–Troy Hills; US 46 / Route 23 in Wayne; Route 19 in Paterson; Route 20 in Paterson; G.S. Parkway / CR 67 in Saddle Brook; Route 17 in Hackensack
- East end: I-95 / N.J. Turnpike / CR 56 in Teaneck

Location
- Country: United States
- State: New Jersey
- Counties: Warren, Sussex, Morris, Essex, Passaic, Bergen

Highway system
- Interstate Highway System; Main; Auxiliary; Suffixed; Business; Future; New Jersey State Highway Routes; Interstate; US; State; Scenic Byways
← Route 79	→ Route 81

Interstate 80 (I-80) is a major Interstate Highway in the United States, running from San Francisco, California, eastward to the New York metropolitan area. In New Jersey, I-80 runs for 68.54 miles (110.30 km) from the Delaware Water Gap Toll Bridge at the Pennsylvania state line to its eastern terminus at the interchange with the New Jersey Turnpike (I-95) in Teaneck, Bergen County. I-95 continues from the end of I-80 to the George Washington Bridge for access to New York City. The highway runs parallel to U.S. Route 46 (US 46) through rural areas of Warren and Sussex counties before heading into more suburban surroundings in Morris County. As the road continues into Passaic and Bergen counties, it heads into more urban areas. The New Jersey Department of Transportation (NJDOT) identifies I-80 within the state as the Christopher Columbus Highway.

A freeway along the I-80 corridor had been planned in 1936 and again in 1955 to provide relief along US 46 between the George Washington Bridge and the Delaware Water Gap. With the establishment of the Interstate Highway System, the planned freeway, which had been identified in some planning documents as the Bergen–Passaic Expressway (which same name is also applied sometimes to I-95/Turnpike north of the I-80 interchange), was incorporated into I-80. The freeway was built across New Jersey in stages from the 1960s to 1973. The westernmost four miles (6.4 km) in New Jersey was originally a rerouting of US 611 when built, although that route was later realigned back into Pennsylvania. In the 1990s, HOV lanes had existed on a part of I-80 in Morris County, but the HOV lanes were opened to regular traffic because they were not used frequently.

== Route description ==
=== Warren and Sussex counties ===
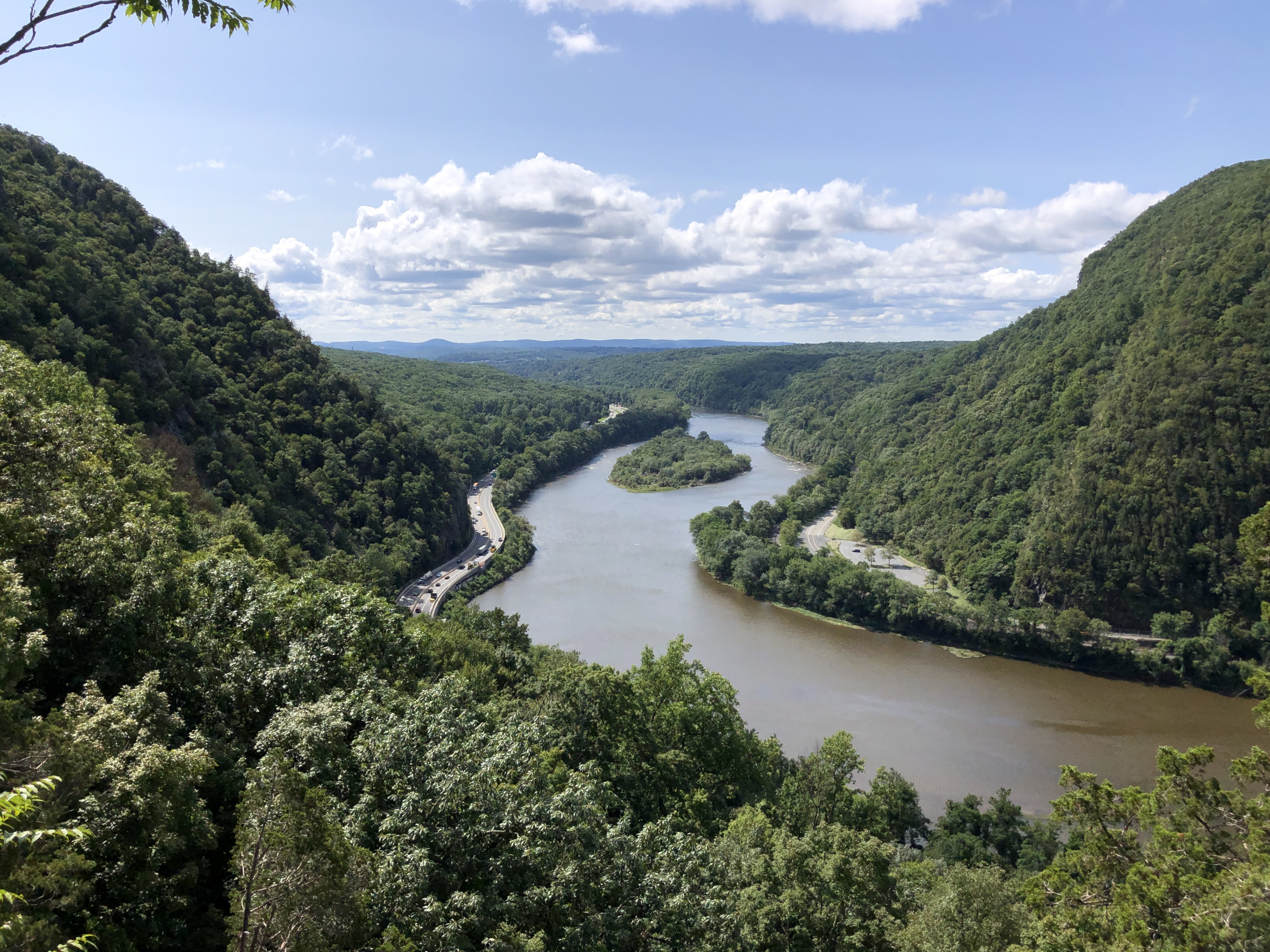
I-80 follows the east (left) bank of the Delaware River through the Delaware Water Gap, with Pennsylvania Route 611 on the opposite (right) bank

I-80 enters Hardwick Township, Warren County, from Pennsylvania on the Delaware Water Gap Toll Bridge over the Delaware River, maintained by the Delaware River Joint Toll Bridge Commission. In addition to carrying I-80, this bridge also carries the Appalachian Trail over the Delaware River. From this point, the four-lane freeway heads south along the east bank of the river through the Delaware Water Gap, immediately reaching a westbound exit and eastbound entrance for Old Mine Road. Now maintained by the New Jersey Department of Transportation, the road makes a sharp turn to the east and comes to a u-turn ramp in both directions that also has access to the Appalachian Trail. The highway heads south again and enters Knowlton Township, where it comes to another set of U-turn ramps that also includes a weigh station in the eastbound direction. After turning southeast and leaving the Delaware Water Gap, the road has a westbound right-in/right-out for Hainesburg Road before crossing under the abandoned Delaware River Viaduct of the Lackawanna Cut-Off. East of the viaduct, I-80 widens to six lanes and reaches a complex interchange with the western terminus of US 46, Route 94, and Decatur Street in Columbia, where development near the route increases. After this interchange, the freeway turns east away from the Delaware River and crosses over Paulins Kill before it continues through wooded and hilly areas containing some farms, with the eastbound direction widening from three to four lanes, and the highway median also widens. A scenic overlook of the Delaware Water Gap is located in the westbound direction while a rest area is located in the eastbound direction.

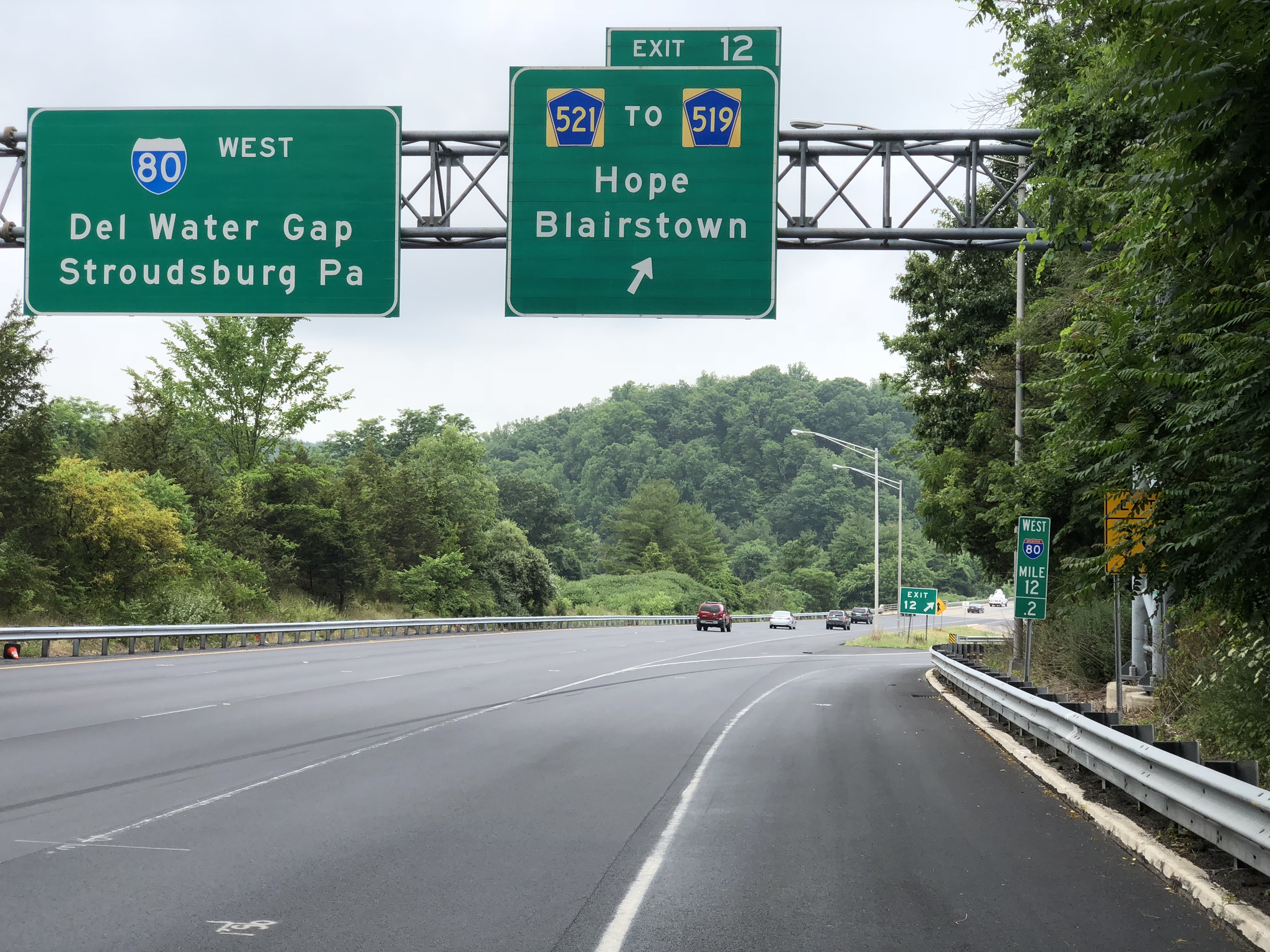
I-80 westbound at CR 521 exit in Hope Township

Upon crossing into Blairstown, the eastbound direction narrows down to three lanes. In Hope Township, I-80 reaches an interchange with County Route 521 (CR 521) that also provides access to CR 519 and the Land of Make Believe amusement park. The highway widens to eight lanes briefly after this interchange before narrowing to six lanes. In Frelinghuysen Township, the freeway carries four lanes eastbound and three lanes westbound. Upon coming into Allamuchy, I-80 has six lanes before gaining a fourth eastbound lane as it comes to the exit for CR 517, providing access to Allamuchy Mountain State Park. Following this, the road runs through densely forested areas of the park, coming to two pairs of rest areas with no facilities in both directions. The eastbound direction becomes three lanes again before the road passes through Byram Township in Sussex County.

=== Morris and Essex counties ===
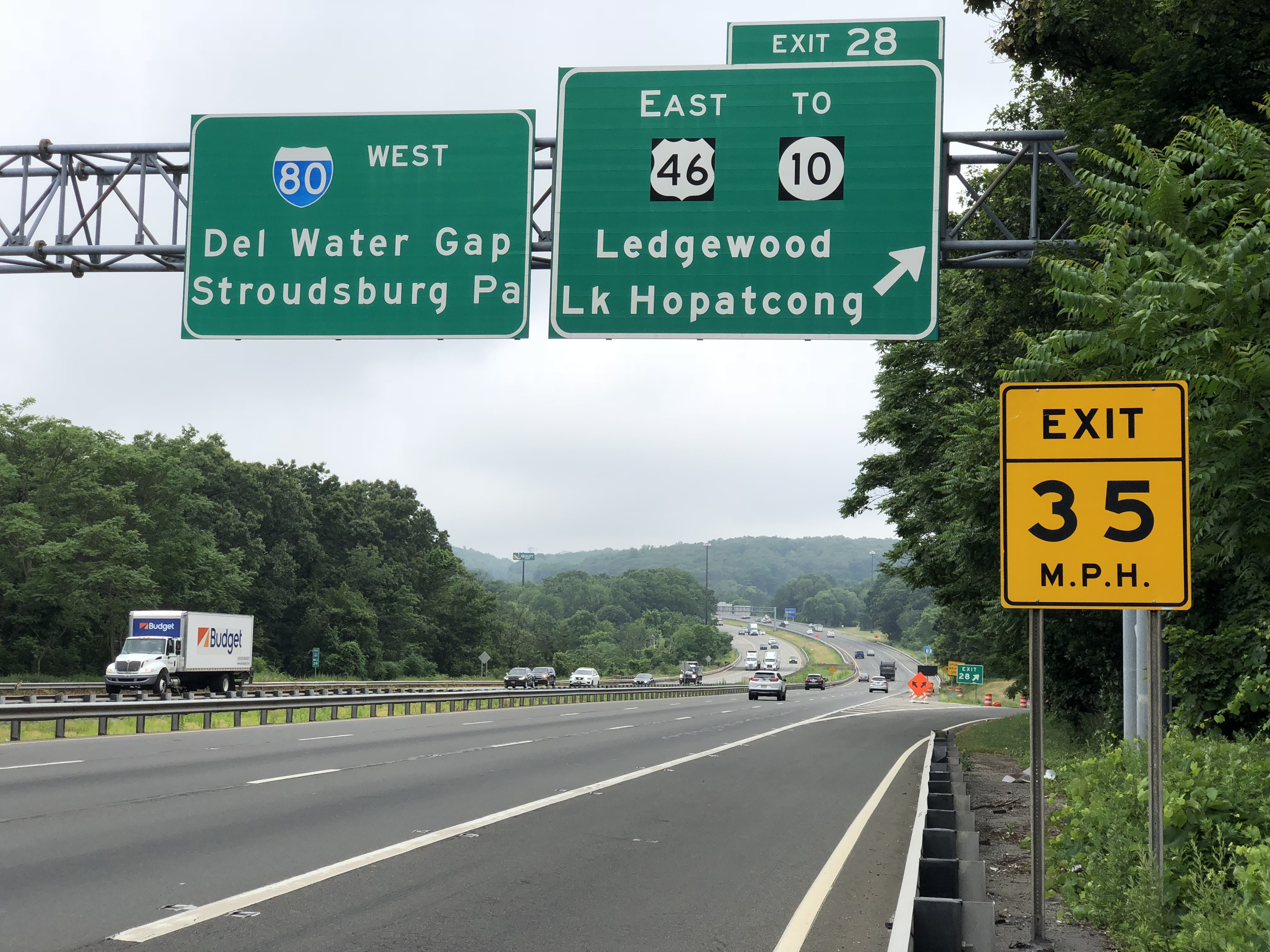
I-80 westbound at US 46 exit in Roxbury Township

Upon crossing the Musconetcong River, I-80 enters Mount Olive in Morris County and passes through more woodland with a narrower median. The road comes to a trumpet interchange with US 206 and forms a concurrency with that route as it bypasses Netcong to the south. After turning southeast and passing near suburban business parks, the highway crosses over the NJ Transit's Morristown Line/Montclair-Boonton Line and reaches a partial interchange with US 46, which has only a westbound exit and eastbound entrance. The freeway briefly crosses through Netcong and Mount Olive again before continuing into Roxbury, where it comes to a modified cloverleaf interchange. At this interchange, Route 183 heads north into Netcong and US 206 splits from I-80 by heading south. The road continues through wooded areas containing some suburban development as it comes to the interchange with Landing Road (CR 631), which also provides access to eastbound US 46. The road crosses the NJ Transit line again and parallels it a short distance to the north as it comes into Mount Arlington and reaches the exit for Howard Boulevard (CR 615), serving Mount Arlington Station. I-80 continues back into Roxbury and comes to a westbound truck rest area with the eastbound one being abandoned. After this, the road heads farther north of the railroad tracks and briefly passes through Jefferson and Rockaway townships before continuing into Wharton. Here, the freeway has an eastbound exit to North Main Street (CR 634) that provides access to Route 15 before it reaches the interchange with Route 15 proper that lacks an eastbound exit.

The highway continues back into Rockaway Township as it widens to eight lanes and comes to the exit for Mt Hope Avenue (CR 661) near the Rockaway Townsquare shopping mall. Suburban development near the highway becomes more dense at this point as I-80 briefly passes through Rockaway before coming to the interchange with CR 513 in Rockaway Township. The freeway passes over the Dover and Rockaway River Railroad's Dover and Rockaway Branch and turns southeast here into Denville. In the center of Denville, it has an eastbound exit and westbound entrance serving US 46 that also provides access to Route 53. There is a westbound exit and eastbound entrance serving both US 46 and Route 53 as the road begins to turn more to the east. I-80 turns south and crosses the Montclair-Boonton Line for a third time before it enters Parsippany–Troy Hills. The highway makes a turn east as it comes into an area of business parks, with the median widening before an interchange serving US 202 and Cherry Hill Road (CR 654). The median narrows again before I-80 reaches the interchange with I-287 that also has movements to US 46, Smith Road, and Littleton Road to and from the east.

Past I-287, I-80 gains the local–express lanes with a 2-3-3-2 configuration. The road continues past more commercial areas, with the local lanes having an eastbound exit and westbound entrance at South Beverwyck Road (CR 637). After this, there is a large interchange with US 46 and the western terminus of I-280, at which point the local–express lanes end. From this point, I-80 continues east through wooded areas as a six-lane freeway, crossing into Montville, where there is a partial interchange providing access to Hook Mountain Road. After a turn to the northeast, the highway comes into Fairfield, Essex County, continuing through wooded surroundings as it heads north before turning east. Development near the road increases as it comes to the westbound exit and eastbound entrance with Two Bridges Road (CR 613).

=== Passaic and Bergen counties ===
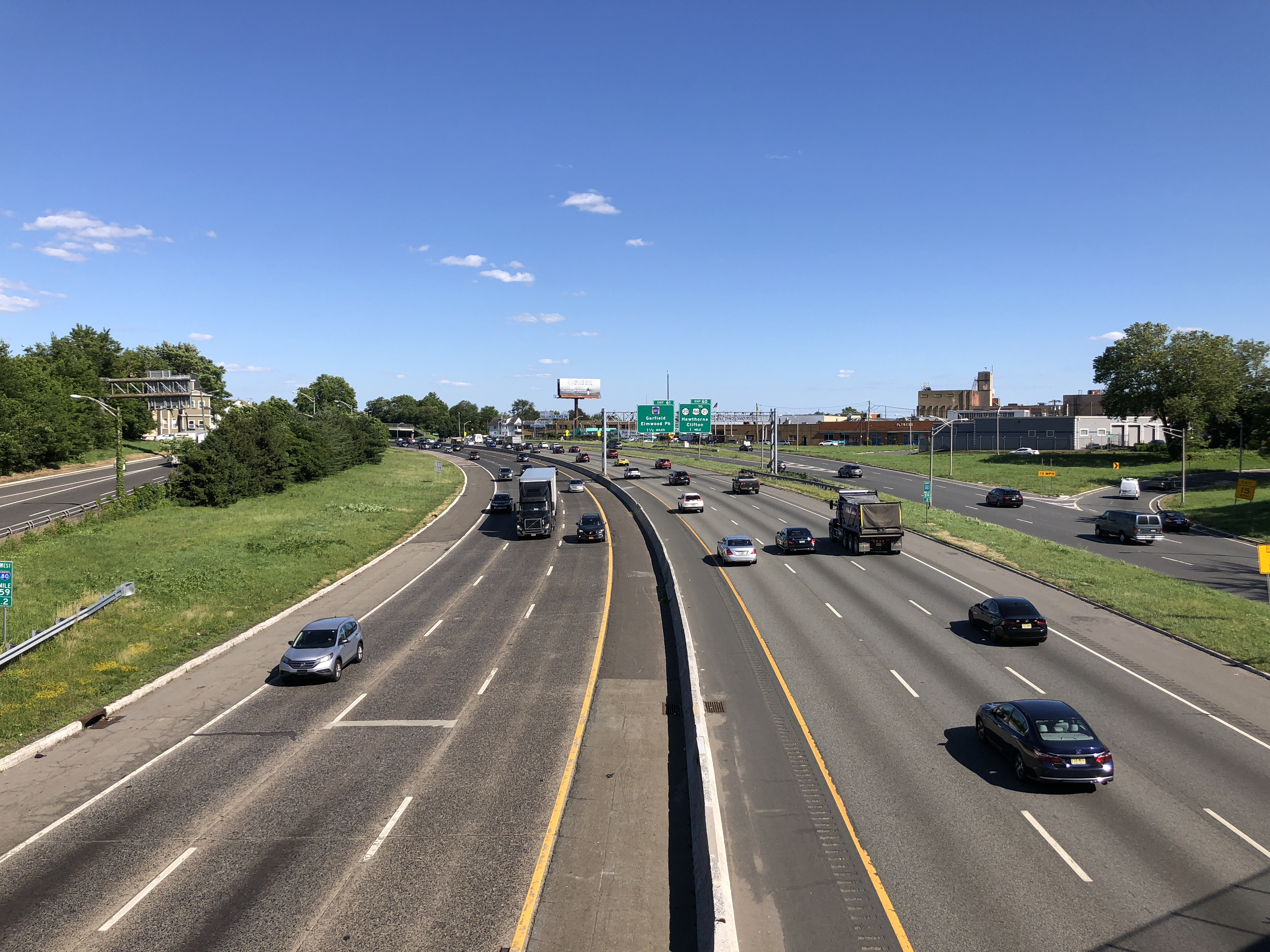
I-80 eastbound in Paterson

After crossing the Passaic River again, I-80 enters Wayne in Passaic County. Here, the road passes under the Montclair-Boonton Line before coming to the spaghetti junction with Route 23 and US 46 near the Willowbrook Mall. At this point, the freeway widens to eight lanes and continues into Totowa, passing near more commercial areas and over the Norfolk Southern Railway railroad line as it comes to an interchange with Minnisink Road (CR 642) that has access to and from the west. A short distance later, there is a westbound exit and eastbound entrance serving Union Boulevard (Route 62 / CR 646). I-80 crosses the Passaic River a third time and enters Woodland Park, where it turns to the northeast past suburban neighborhoods and reaches an interchange serving Squirrelwood Road (CR 636). Passing to the north of the Garret Mountain Reservation, the freeway enters Paterson and turns east into urban areas as it comes to the interchange with Route 19. After Route 19, I-80 runs above Paterson on a viaduct, crossing over the NJ Transit's Main Line before coming to the exit for Madison Avenue (CR 649). The road returns to ground level near urban neighborhoods as it comes to an eastbound exit and westbound entrance serving Market Street before reaching an interchange with Route 20.

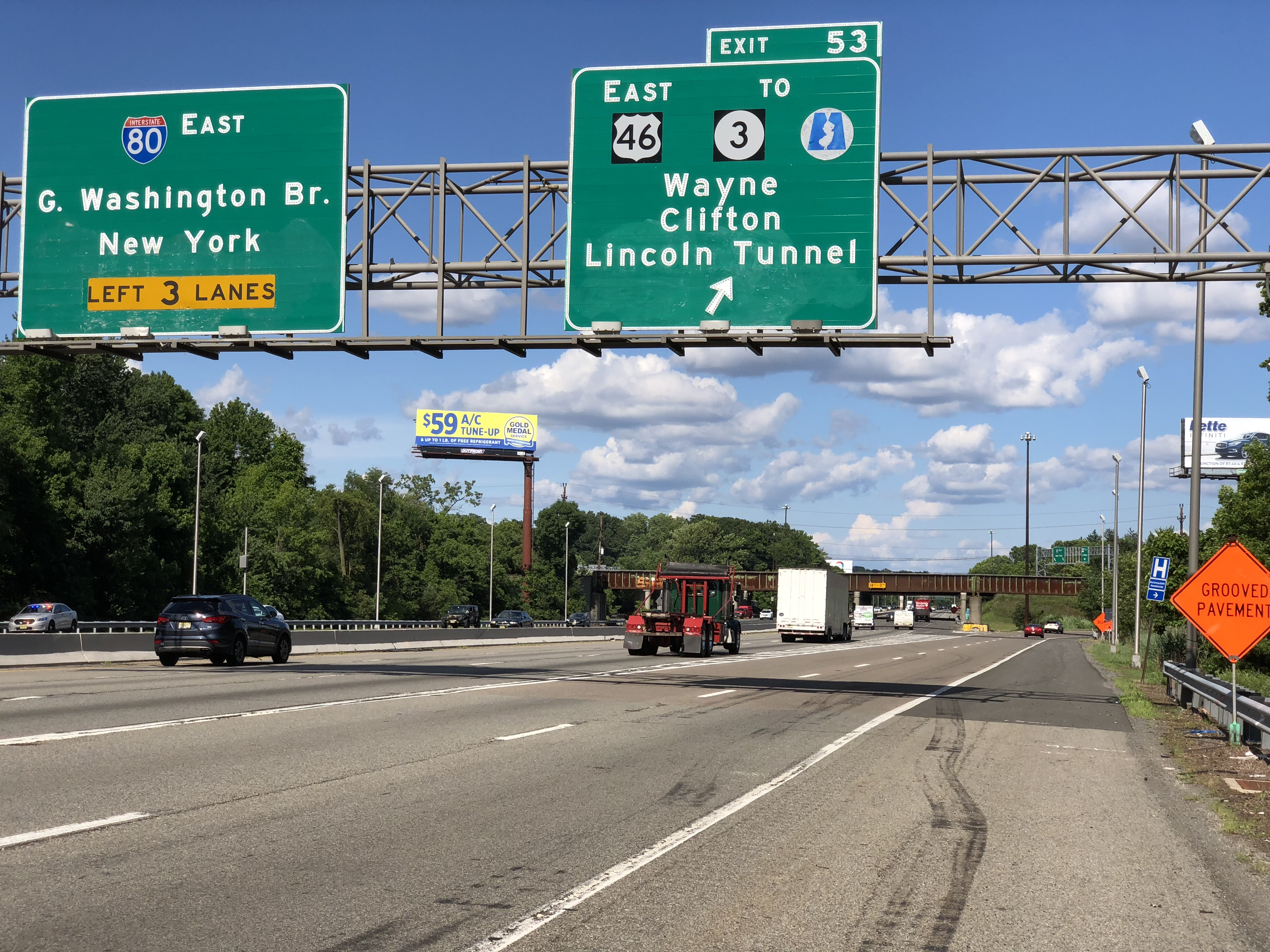
I-80 eastbound at the exit for US 46 in Wayne

After a fourth crossing of the Passaic River, I-80 comes into Elmwood Park in Bergen County and reaches the exit for CR 507. It continues near suburban neighborhoods, coming to a bridge over the New York, Susquehanna and Western Railway's New Jersey Subdivision line, and passes over the NJ Transit's Bergen County Line as it comes to an interchange with the Garden State Parkway on the border of Elmwood Park and Saddle Brook that also has connections to Midland Avenue (CR 67). At the Garden State Parkway, I-80 gains a 2-2 local–express lane configuration eastbound while the westbound direction carries four lanes. The next interchange along the road is with Saddle River Road (CR 79) and is a westbound entrance and an eastbound exit accessible from the local lanes. The freeway passes over the New York, Susquehanna and Western Railway line again and turns south along the west bank of the Saddle River, eventually crossing it into Lodi. Immediately after, there is a diamond interchange at Riverview Avenue that provides access to Route 4 and Route 17. Heading southeast, I-80 passes over the New York, Susquehanna and Western Railway Lodi Branch line and comes to an interchange at Route 17, which provides access to US 46 to the south, Route 4 to the north, and various local roads. At this point, I-80 runs between the travel lanes of Route 17 as it continues into Hackensack. Past Route 17, I-80 gains a 3-2-2-3 local–express lane configuration and crosses over the NJ Transit's Pascack Valley Line before passing through industrial parks and runs briefly through South Hackensack. Here, there is an interchange to Green Street before the highway comes into Teterboro. Turning east, the freeway runs through South Hackensack before entering Hackensack, where an exit provides access to Hudson Street (CR 124). The road passes near neighborhoods before crossing the Hackensack River into Ridgefield Park, where it passes over the New York, Susquehanna and Western Railway's New Jersey Subdivision line and CSX Transportation's River Subdivision line before there is an exit for 2nd Street. The freeway briefly passes through Bogota before it continues into Teaneck. In Teaneck, I-80 reaches its eastern terminus at the interchange with the New Jersey Turnpike (I-95). From here, one can head southbound on I-95 on the turnpike towards Newark or head northbound towards the George Washington Bridge and New York City.

== History ==
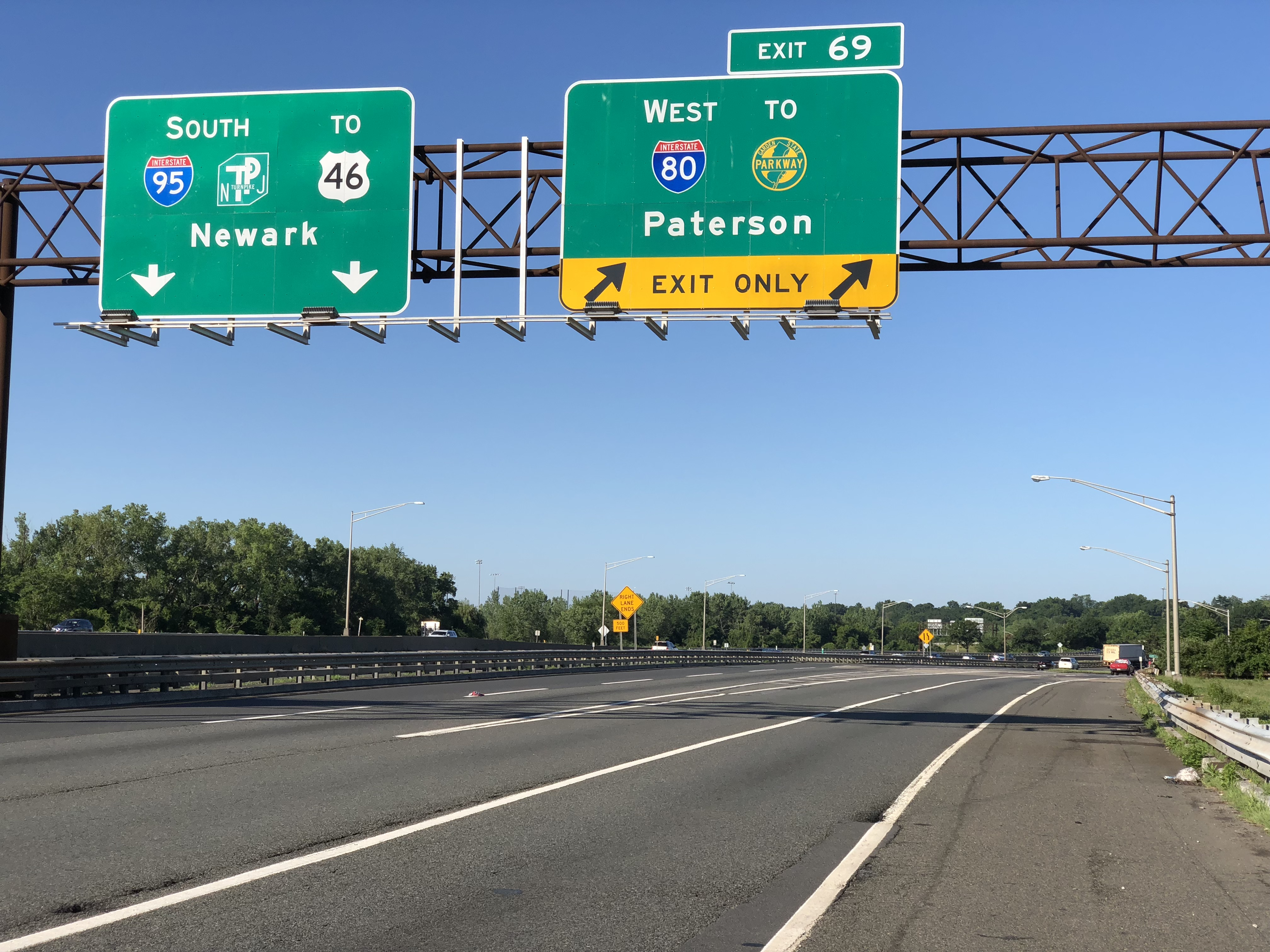
View west at I-80's east end at I-95 in Teaneck

A freeway along the I-80 corridor was first planned in 1936 as a replacement for the cross-state US 46, running from the George Washington Bridge west to the Delaware Water Gap and Scranton, Pennsylvania. After World War II, New Jersey officials considered the proposal again in 1955. Coming off the George Washington Bridge, Route 4 and US 46 already provided high-speed corridors, but they were overloaded, and so a new corridor in between, the Bergen–Passaic Expressway, was planned to run from the bridge to Paterson. The planned route west to the Delaware Water Gap was designated in 1956 as Federal Aid Interstate Route 101 by the New Jersey State Highway Department. It first received the I-82 designation before finally becoming a part of I-80 in 1958. The easternmost section of the route, leading to the bridge, had become part of I-95.

The section of I-80 through the Delaware Water Gap had already opened on December 16, 1953, running from the Delaware Water Gap Toll Bridge to Route 94 at Columbia. This road was signed as a realignment of US 611 from Pennsylvania, later receiving the I-80 designation. The old alignment of US 611 in Pennsylvania had become US 611 Alt.. By 1966, I-80 had been completed from Netcong to Denville and from Paterson to I-95. By 1969, the section between I-280 in Parsippany–Troy Hills and Route 23 in Wayne was finished. Also around this time, US 611 was moved off I-80 and back into Pennsylvania, replacing US 611 Alt. By 1971, the section between Wayne and Paterson was completed along with the part between US 202 and I-280. A 3.5-mile (5.6 km) section between US 46 in Denville and US 202 in Parsippany–Troy Hills, was opened in September 1973. Also in 1973, the section between US 206 in Netcong and US 46 and Route 94 in Columbia was completed, and the interchange in Columbia was realigned into a complex array of ramps.

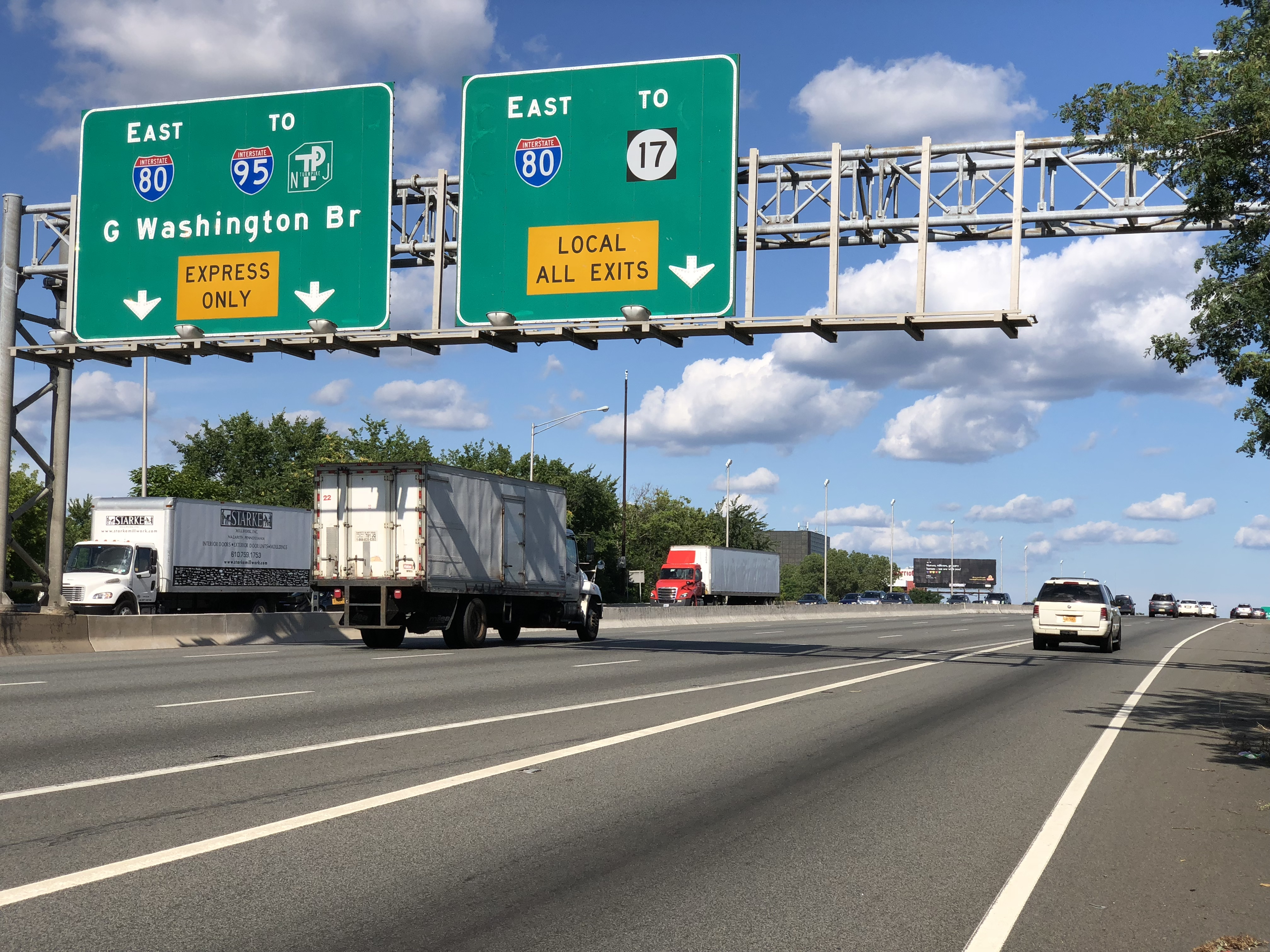
I-80 eastbound in Elmwood Park, approaching the split into local and express lanes

In 1982, two rest areas along I-80 were closed due to chronic use for illegal activities. The rest area in Lodi, next to westbound exit 63, closed on June 30, and the rest area at Roxbury in Morris County closed in October. However, the latter reopened on August 14, 1991, for trucks only.

In the 1990s, HOV lanes were built along I-80 between Rockaway Township and Parsippany–Troy Hills. These HOV lanes, along with the ones that had been built on I-287, were opened to regular traffic in 1998 due to lack of usage, and the state did not have to repay the federal government the $240 million (equivalent to $430 million in 2024) to build the lanes.

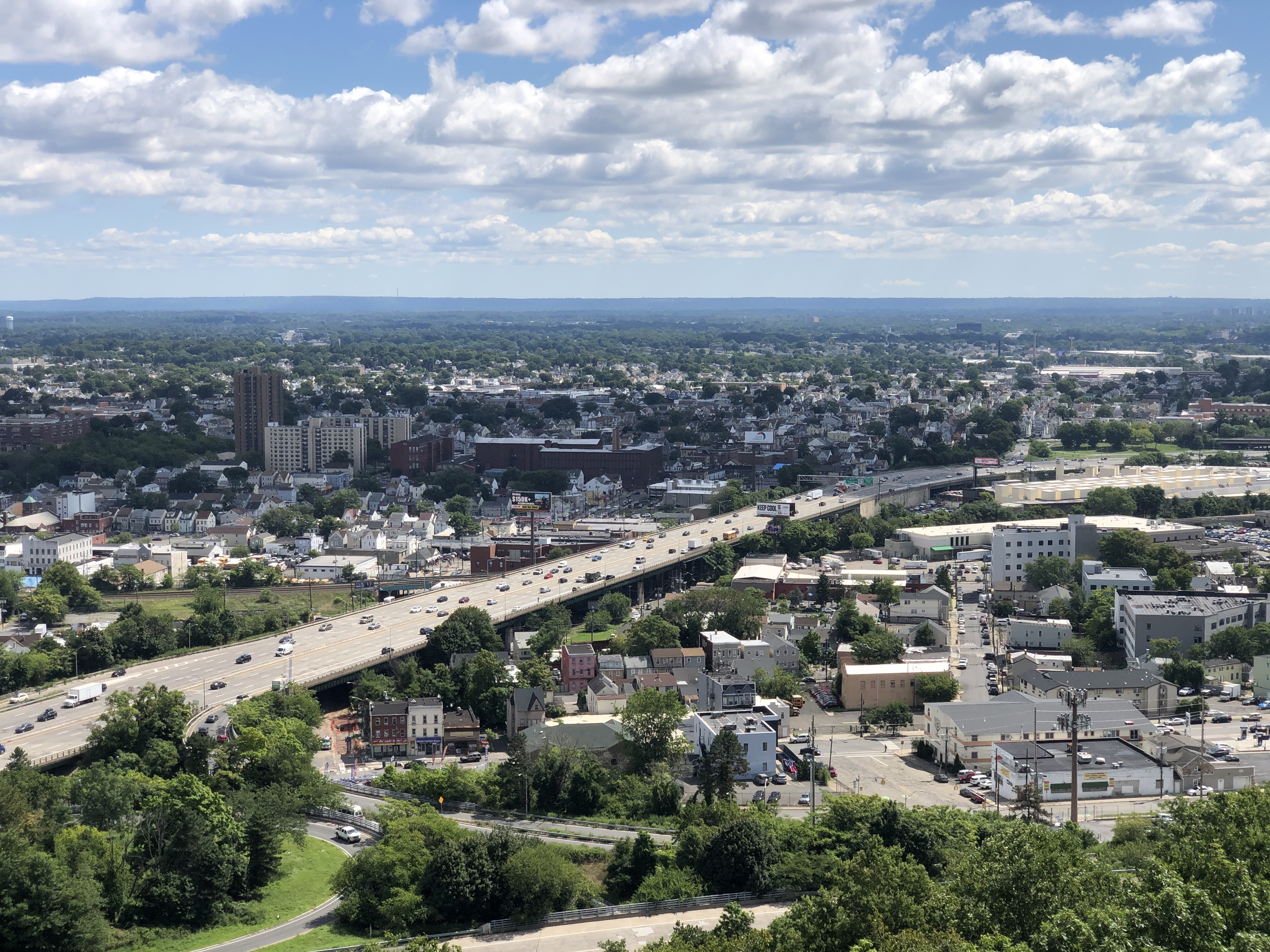
I-80 eastbound in Paterson, viewed from the Garret Mountain Reservation

In 1994, the New Jersey Department of Transportation adopted and began using the Rockfall Hazard Rating System for evaluating and ranking highway rock-cut slopes. The segment of I-80 between mileposts 1.0 and 1.4, has been continually characterized as having the highest rockfall hazard rating scores in the state. Nine rockfall incidents and one fatality have been reported between 2001 and 2016. In June 2019, the New Jersey Department of Transportation held a public meeting regarding a proposed rock wall along I-80 in the Delaware Water Gap National Recreation Area. The $60-million project, dubbed the "Jurassic Park fence", would involve the construction of a 60-foot (18 m) metal fence between milemarker 1.04 and 1.45 to prevent rocks from falling onto the highway.

On June 22, 2001, a tanker crashed on a westbound bridge on I-80 in Denville, causing a fiery explosion that damaged the bridge and forced its demolition. A temporary bridge had to be built, and traffic on this part of I-80 as well as adjacent roads was snarled; in addition, a state of emergency had been declared for Morris County. The new I-80 bridge opened in September 2001.

I-80, like many other highways in New Jersey, once had solar powered emergency callboxes every one mile (1.6 km), however, with the advent of cellphones, the usage of these callboxes became extremely limited. To save on maintenance costs, the New Jersey Department of Transportation removed these callboxes in 2005.

In August 2012, the New Jersey Department of Transportation announced a $73-million (equivalent to $98.3 million in 2024) project will completely rehabilitate and improve I-80 eastbound between US 202 and the South Beverwyck Road interchange, a very busy part of highway with an average of 159,000 vehicles traveling it daily.

=== 2024 mineshaft collapse ===
On December 27, 2024, an abandoned mineshaft located under the highway near exit 34 in Wharton collapsed, creating a large sinkhole on the eastbound outer shoulder that required the closure of the highway. I-80 east is set to remain closed until further notice, and repair work has been made more challenging due to the mine and incoming weather conditions. It has since been fixed.

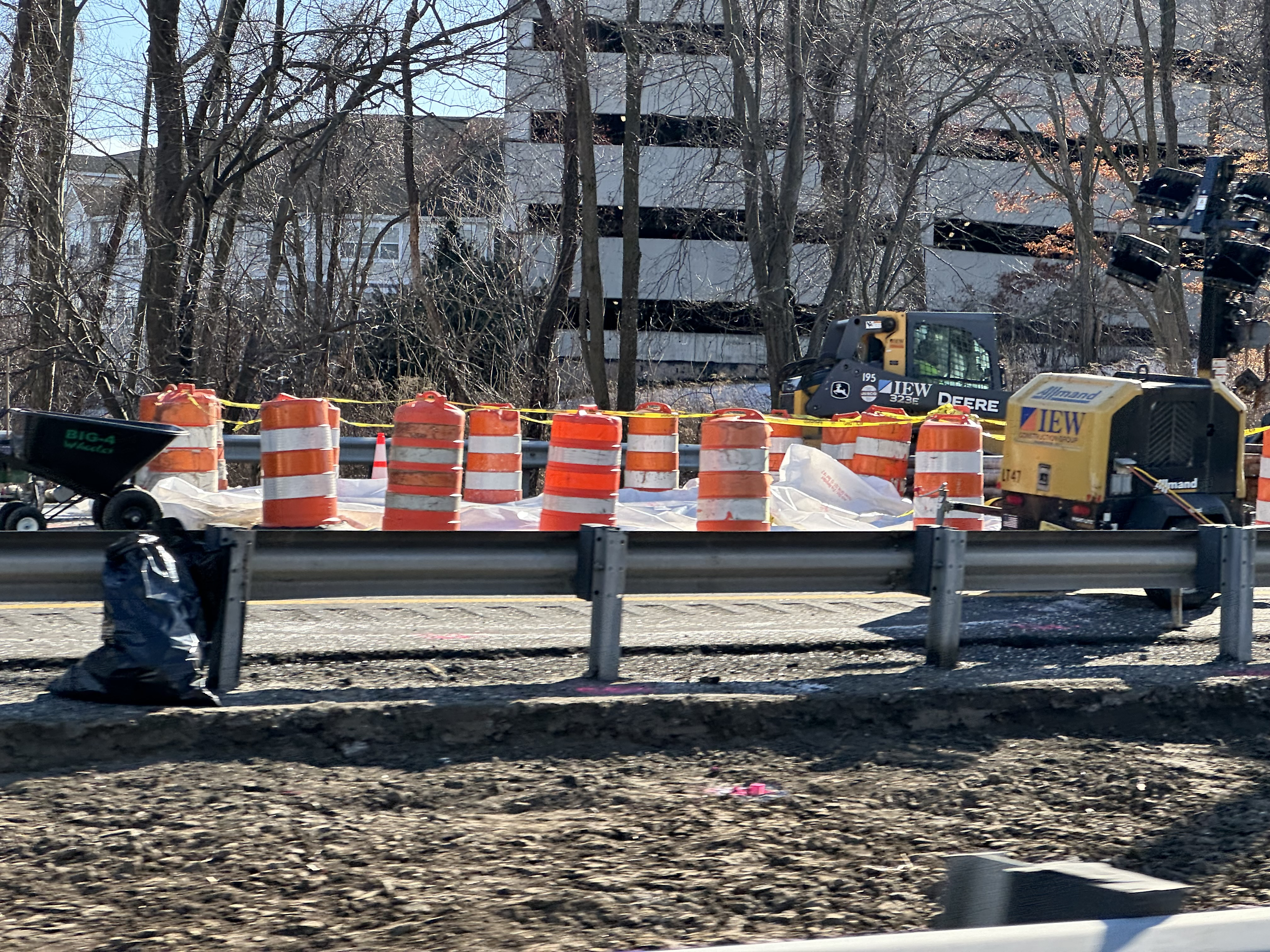
Repair work on the second sinkhole February 18, 2025

On February 10, 2025, the same section of I-80 east collapsed a second time, and the roadway continued to remain closed as of March 16, 2025, with estimates for repair extending for another two months from that date. On March 8, 2025, Governor Phil Murphy declared a state of emergency for Morris County to aide repairs.

On March 19, 2025, at a little after 5 p.m. another sinkhole opened in the same area, this time on the median and bordering the westbound lanes. The westbound lanes were also shutdown, bringing I-80 to a complete shutdown in the Wharton area (milemarker 34). The state DOT had plans to create a crossover for commercial eastbound traffic to use the westbound lanes in order to relieve congestion on local roads in order to mitigate the negative impacts on local businesses as well as to ease the passage of local emergency vehicles, which was questioned after the incident.

NJDOT announced that they planned to have the westbound side of the highway reopened on March 28, 2025, but they discovered another "significant void" that evening and have said that the westbound side will be closed for at least another five weeks. Estimates for the eastbound side closure lasted at least another seven weeks. The highway was entirely repaired as of June 21, 2025. All lanes in both directions were reopened, which was ahead of schedule from the previous estimate.

== Exit list ==
County	Location	mi	km	Exit	Destinations	Notes
Delaware River		0.00	0.00	–	I-80 west to PA 611 – Stroudsburg, Delaware Water Gap	Continuation into Pennsylvania
Delaware River		0.00	0.00	Delaware Water Gap Toll Bridge (westbound toll in Pennsylvania)		
Warren	Hardwick Township	0.10	0.16	1	Millbrook, Flatbrookville	Access via Old Mine Road; last westbound exit before toll
Warren	Knowlton Township	2.05	3.30	Weigh station		
Warren	Knowlton Township	3.39	5.46	–	Hainesburg Road	Westbound exit and entrance
Warren	Knowlton Township	4.20	6.76	4A	Columbia	Eastbound exit and westbound entrance; access via Decatur Street
Warren	Knowlton Township	4.58	7.37	4	US 46 east / Route 94 to PA 611 – Portland PA, Buttzville, Blairstown	Signed as exits 4B (south/east) and 4C (north); western terminus of US 46
Warren	Hope Township	12.03	19.36	12	CR 521 to CR 519 – Blairstown, Hope	To Land of Make Believe
Warren	Allamuchy Township	19.88	31.99	19	CR 517 – Hackettstown, Allamuchy, Andover	To Allamuchy Mountain State Park
Sussex	No major junctions					
Morris	Mount Olive Township	25.25	40.64	25	US 206 north – Stanhope, Newton	Western end of US 206 concurrency
Morris	Netcong	26.25	42.25	26	US 46 west – Budd Lake, Hackettstown	Westbound exit and eastbound entrance
Morris	Roxbury	27.19	43.76	27	US 206 south / Route 183 north – Somerville, Netcong	Signed as exits 27A (south) and 27B (north); eastern end of US 206 concurrency; southern terminus of Route 183
Morris	Roxbury	28.91	46.53	28	US 46 east to Route 10 – Ledgewood, Lake Hopatcong	
Morris	Mount Arlington	30.61	49.26	30	Howard Boulevard (CR 615) – Mount Arlington	To Mount Arlington station
Morris	Wharton			34	To Route 15 – Wharton, Dover, Sparta	Eastbound exit only; access via North Main Street
Morris	Wharton	34.02	54.75	34	Route 15 – Wharton, Jefferson, Sparta	No eastbound exit; signed as exits 34A (south) and 34B (north)
Morris	Rockaway Township	35.33	56.86	35	Mount Hope, Dover	Signed as exits 35A (Dover) and 35B (Mount Hope) westbound; access via CR 661; to Rockaway Townsquare
Morris	Rockaway Township	37.66	60.61	37	CR 513 – Hibernia, Rockaway	
Morris	Denville Township	38.81	62.46	38	US 46 east to Route 53 south – Denville	Eastbound exit and westbound entrance; to Denville station
Morris	Denville Township	39.57	63.68	39	US 46 east / Route 53 south – Denville	Westbound exit and eastbound entrance; northern terminus of Route 53; to Denville station
Morris	Parsippany–Troy Hills	42.46	68.33	42A	US 202 south – Morris Plains	
Morris	Parsippany–Troy Hills	42.46	68.33	42B	To US 46 – Parsippany	No eastbound exit; access via CR 654
Morris	Parsippany–Troy Hills	42.46	68.33	42C	US 202 north – Parsippany	Eastbound exit and westbound entrance
Morris	Parsippany–Troy Hills	43.62	70.20	43	I-287 / US 46 / Smith Road / Littleton Road – Morristown, Mahwah	Signed as exits 43A (south) and 43B (north) westbound; no eastbound access to US 46/Smith/Littleton; exits 41A-B on I-287
Morris	Parsippany–Troy Hills			Western terminus of local–express lanes		
Morris	Parsippany–Troy Hills	45.34	72.97	45	Lake Hiawatha, Whippany	Eastbound exit and westbound entrance; access via CR 637
Morris	Parsippany–Troy Hills	46.36	74.61	47A	I-280 east – The Oranges, Newark	Eastbound exit and westbound entrance; western terminus of I-280
Morris	Parsippany–Troy Hills	46.36	74.61	Eastern terminus of local–express lanes		
Morris	Parsippany–Troy Hills	46.50	74.83	47B	US 46 – The Caldwells, Montclair, Parsippany	Same-directional access only; signed as exit 47 westbound
Morris	Montville	47.83	76.97	48	Montville, Pine Brook	Westbound exit and eastbound entrance; access via Hook Mountain Road
Essex	Fairfield Township	52.48	84.46	52	Lincoln Park, Fairfield, The Caldwells	Westbound exit and eastbound entrance; access via CR 613
Passaic	Wayne	53.62	86.29	53	US 46 east to Route 3 east – Wayne, Clifton, Lincoln Tunnel	Eastbound exit and westbound entrance; access to Meadowlands Sports Complex
Passaic	Wayne	53.62	86.29	53	US 46 / Route 23 – Wayne, Butler, Verona	Westbound exit and eastbound entrance
Passaic	Totowa	54.73	88.08	54	Minnisink Road (CR 642) – Little Falls, Totowa	Eastbound exit and westbound entrance
Passaic	Totowa	55.21	88.85	55	Union Boulevard (Route 62 south / CR 646) – Little Falls, Totowa	Westbound exit and eastbound entrance; signed as exits 55A (south) and 55B (north)
Passaic	Woodland Park	57.07	91.85	56	Squirrelwood Road (CR 636) – Woodland Park, Paterson	Signed as exits 56A (south) and 56B (north) eastbound
Passaic	Paterson	58.22	93.70	57	Route 19 – Clifton, Downtown Paterson	Signed as exits 57A (south) and 57B (north); Route 19 north not signed
Passaic	Paterson	58.37	93.94	57C	Main Street (CR 509) – Paterson	Westbound exit and eastbound entrance
Passaic	Paterson	59.06	95.05	58	Madison Avenue (CR 649) – Paterson, Clifton	Signed as exits 58A (south) and 58B (north)
Passaic	Paterson	60.04	96.63	59	Market Street – Paterson	Westbound exit and eastbound entrance
Passaic	Paterson	60.41	97.22	60	Route 20 to US 46 / Route 21 south – Hawthorne, Clifton	No westbound access to Route 20 south
Bergen	Elmwood Park	60.81	97.86	61	CR 507 – Garfield, Elmwood Park	To US 46
Bergen	Saddle Brook	62.34	100.33	62A	G.S. Parkway / Midland Avenue – Saddle Brook	Signed as exit 62 westbound; no eastbound access to GSP south; access to Midland Avenue via Pehle Avenue; access to Saddle Brook via CR 67; exit 159 on G.S. Parkway
Bergen	Saddle Brook	62.34	100.33	Western terminus of eastbound local–express lanes		
Bergen	Saddle Brook			62B	Saddle River Road (CR 79) – Fair Lawn, Lodi	Eastbound exit and westbound entrance
Bergen	Lodi	63.82	102.71	63	To Route 17 / Route 4 – Rochelle Park, Paramus, Lodi, Fair Lawn	Access via Riverview Avenue; signed for Route 4/Lodi/Fair Lawn westbound, Rochelle Park/Paramus eastbound; to Maywood
Bergen	Lodi	65.00	104.61	Western terminus of westbound local–express lanes		
Bergen	Hackensack			64	Route 17 south to US 46 east – Hasbrouck Heights, Newark	Eastbound exit and westbound entrance
Bergen	Hackensack			64A	Route 17 north to Route 4 – Rochelle Park, Paramus	Westbound exit and eastbound entrance
Bergen	Hackensack			64B	To Route 17 south – Hasbrouck Heights, Newark	Westbound exit and eastbound entrance; access via Polifly Road
Bergen	Teterboro–South Hackensack line	65.67	105.69	65	Green Street – Teterboro, South Hackensack	
Bergen	Hackensack	66.55	107.10	66	Hudson Street (CR 124) – Hackensack, Little Ferry	
Bergen	Ridgefield Park	67.22	108.18	67	Bogota, Ridgefield Park	Eastbound exit and westbound entrance; access via 2nd Street
Bergen	Teaneck	68.17	109.71	68A	To I-95 Toll south / N.J. Turnpike south / US 46 – Meadowlands Sports Complex	Eastbound exit and westbound entrance; exit number not signed
Bergen	Teaneck			70	Leonia, Teaneck	Eastbound exit and westbound entrance; signed as exits 70A (Leonia) and 70B (Teaneck); access via CR 56; exit nos. correspond to I-95
Bergen	Teaneck	68.54	110.30	68B	I-95 north (N.J. Turnpike north) – George Washington Bridge, New York City	Eastern terminus; exit number not signed; exit 69 on I-95 / Turnpike
1.000 mi = 1.609 km; 1.000 km = 0.621 mi: Concurrency terminus; Electronic toll collection; Incomplete access

== Auxiliary routes ==
- I-280, known locally as the Essex Freeway

== See also ==
Interstate 80
Previous state: Pennsylvania	New Jersey	Next state: Terminus
