= Mona May =

American costume designer

Mona May is an American costume designer who has worked on over 70 movie and television programs. With her trademark feminine style, using bold colors and feathery boas, May has been designing costumes since 1989.

May has been hailed by some as "The Queen of 90s Movie Fashion". She is best known for her work on Amy Heckerling's teen-comedy Clueless (1995). Additionally, she has worked on other popular late-90s and early-2000s films such as Romy and Michele's High School Reunion (1997), The Wedding Singer (1998), A Night at the Roxbury (1998), Never Been Kissed (1999), and Loser (2000). In 2008, she was nominated for a Costume Designers Guild Award for her work on Disney's Enchanted (2007).

== Early life ==
Mona May was born in India to a German mother and Polish father. She grew up in Warsaw and Berlin. She then moved to New York City, and later Los Angeles, where she now resides. May studied fashion in Paris and New York, and attended the Fashion Institute Of Design and Merchandising in Los Angeles.

== Career ==
After her studies, May worked on commercials and music videos for artists such as Run-DMC and Debbie Gibson. In 1989, May booked her first official job costume designing. She designed for Julie Brown's Just Say Julie, an MTV comedy series. From there, she worked on numerous projects with actress and comedian Julie Brown such as Medusa: Dare to Be Truthful (1991), Carol Leifer: Gaudy, Bawdy & Blue (1992), and Attack of the 5 Ft. 2 Women (1994).

In that time, May met American film director Amy Heckerling. They worked on a TV pilot together, which did not get picked up. The pair made an instant creative connection that led to later collaborations.

=== Clueless ===
In 1995, Heckerling hired May to design for her teen-comedy Clueless. Clueless is one of May's most well known works, considered by some a classic with influences on the style of the time. Fashion plays an important role in the film's narrative and character development. Alicia Silverstone, who played the lead Cher Horowitz, had 60 costume changes throughout the film. Cher's style fused over-the-knee 1920's style socks, 60s mod-style mini skirts, feather boas, and chic 90s designer slip dresses. The clothing for the film was a mix of vintage and high fashion, sourced from thrift stores and runways, with some pieces designed and made by May herself.

May's work with Clueless did not end with the movie. She designed for the Clueless television spinoff (1996–1997) which had up to 15 costume changes per episode, and collaborated with Mattel for their line of Clueless dolls.

=== Romy and Michele's Highschool Reunion ===
In 1997, May did the costume design for the cult film Romy and Michele's Highschool Reunion. May has described her work on Romy and Michele's High School Reunion as a grown-up version of Clueless, with "higher heels and shorter skirts".

Much like Clueless, fashion also played a key role in Romy and Michele's Highschool Reunion. The clothes worn in the film are vibrant, textured, reflective and iridescent, with each color chosen to express the character who wears it. The main two characters, played by Lisa Kudrow and Mira Sorvino, had about 35 to 40 costume changes throughout the film. One-third of the film's costumes were hand-made by May, and the rest was a mix of designer and thrift store pieces.

=== Later work ===
After Romy and Michele's Highschool Reunion, May worked on The Wedding Singer (1998), A Night at the Roxbury (1998), 8MM (1999), and Never Been Kissed (1999). Starting with The Wedding Singer (1998), May has had a 20+ year history of collaborating with actress/producer Drew Barrymore, including Never Been Kissed (1999), and more recently, the television series Santa Clarita Diet (2017–2019).

May has worked on costumes for animated films such as Stuart Little 2 (2002), The Haunted Mansion (2003), and Enchanted (2007). She describes the process of working with animated characters as similar to live-action, with virtual fittings and different proportions to dress. Enchanted blended live-action and animation. She first had to design the costumes in 2D old-style Disney animation, translate them to live action, then translate that into 3D CGI animation. Her work on Enchanted earned her a nomination for a 2008 Costume Designers Guild Award for Excellence in Fantasy Film.

Since Enchanted, May has worked on over 40 films and television series' such as The House Bunny (2008), Married (2014–15), Grandfathered (2015–16), and Flora & Ulysses (2021). She also worked on the film Ant-Man and The Wasp: Quantumania (2022).

In September 2020, Mona May teamed up with the online thrift company Thrilling to curate a 500-piece collection of 1990s inspired vintage clothing.

== Filmography ==
Title	Year
Just Say Julie	1989
Medusa: Dare to Be Truthful	1991
House IV	1992
Valhalla	1992
3 Ninjas	1992
Carol Leifer: Gaudy, Bawdy & Blue	1992
Best of the Best II	1993
Attack of the 5 Ft. 2 Women	1994
Clueless	1995
High School High	1996
Clueless (TV series)	1996-1997
Romy and Michele's High School Reunion	1997
The Wedding Singer	1998
A Night at the Roxbury	1998
8MM	1999
Never Been Kissed	1999
Loser	2000
Zenon: The Zequel	2001
Stuart Little 2	2002
The Master of Disguise	2002
Easy	2003
The Haunted Mansion	2003
Zenon: Z3	2004
Stuck in the Suburbs	2004
Miles from Home	2006
Enchanted	2007
The Cheetah Girls: One World	2008
The House Bunny	2008
Streak	2008
Aliens in the Attic	2009
Wizards of Waverly Place: The Movie	2009
Love at First Hiccup	2009
Camp Rock 2: The Final Jam	2010
Flypaper	2011
Just Go with It	2011
Lemonade Mouth	2011
Zookeeper	2011
American Reunion	2012
The Giant Mechanical Man	2012
Let It Shine	2012
Vamps	2012
Curse of the Sunset Starlet	2013
Half Way Home	2013
IIDawn	2014
Parts Per Billion	2014
Ask Me Anything	2014
Petals on the Wind	2014
Comet	2014
Jackie & Ryan	2014
Whitney	2015
Married	2014-2015
The Trust	2016
Grandfathered	2015-2016
Sister Cities	2016
Incarnate	2016
Pearl	2016
All I Wish	2017
SPF-18	2017
Banana Split	2018
Santa Clarita Diet	2017-2019
Words on Bathroom Walls	2020
Flora & Ulysses	2021
Punky Brewster	2021
Mixtape	2021
Romy and Michele 2	2027

== Cultural impact and legacy ==
The fashion from Clueless is often credited with reshaping the trends of the 1990s, from grunge, to more vibrant and feminine. Fashion designers, clothing lines, YouTubers, and celebrities riff off of Clueless's style, created by Mona May. The styles of Romy and Michele's High School Reunion can also be seen referenced in certain fashion trends.

Celebrities such as Iggy Azalea, Ariana Grande, and Willow Smith, have worn versions of Cher's yellow plaid suit from Clueless .

Shortly after Clueless premiered, Karl Lagerfeld put a Chanel water-bottle holder on his runway, which was an accessory May created for Cher in the film. In the fall of 2018, Versace had a Clueless-inspired look on their runway in Milan.

Mona May's costumes from Clueless, Romy and Michele's High School Reunion, and more, are often worn as Halloween costumes.
