= Thrills (disambiguation) =

Thrills is a Canadian brand of chewing gum.

Thrills may also refer to:

- Thrills (Andrew Bird's Bowl of Fire album), 1998
- Thrills (Ellen Allien album), 2005
- "Thrills" (Peking Duk song), featuring Rico Nasty, 2026
- "Thrills" (Spacey Jane song), 2017
- "Thrills", a song by LCD Soundsystem from the 2005 self-titled album
- "Thrills", a song by Stewart Copeland from the 1980 album Klark Kent
- Thrills, an American punk band featuring bassist Merle Allin

== Other uses ==
- The Thrills, Irish indie rock band

== See also ==
- Thrill (disambiguation)
