= Land of Make Believe (amusement park) =

Family amusement and water park

- Interactive map of Land of Make Believe
- Location: 354 Great Meadows Road, Hope, New Jersey, United States
- Coordinates: 40°54.122′N 74°57.542′W
- Status: Operating
- Opened: 1954
- Operating season: May–September
- Area: 30 acres (12 ha)

Attractions
- Total: 33
- Roller coasters: 2
- Water rides: 9
- Website: www.lomb.com

The Land of Make Believe is a family amusement park and water park catering mostly to families and children under 13 years of age. It is designed specifically for parents to participate with their children. Opened in 1954 by Hermann Maier, it is in Hope Township, in Warren County, New Jersey, on County Route 611, 2 mi (3.2 km) from exit 12 off of Interstate 80. It centers itself around "Safe and wholesome recreation", with entertaining rides and attractions that are most appropriate for children under the age of thirteen, but also has many attractions for people of all ages.

The park is still family-owned as of 2022.

== Ride styles ==
Some of its most prominent attractions are the civil war train (which loops around most of the park), the Pirate's Wading Pool, largest in America with life size Pirate Ship and the Pirates Escape & Pirates revenge dual racing slides. The Land of Make Believe has many of the standard amusement park rides like a junior sized roller coaster, a Tilt-A-Whirl, Drop & Twist, Tornado, Scream Machine 360, and Pirate's Fury as well as more specialized attractions like an Off Road Safari Adventure and a petting zoo. Some more of the water attractions include the Pirates Plunge, Blackbeard's Pirate Fort, The Sidewinder, Blackbeard's Action River Ride, and eight waterslides.

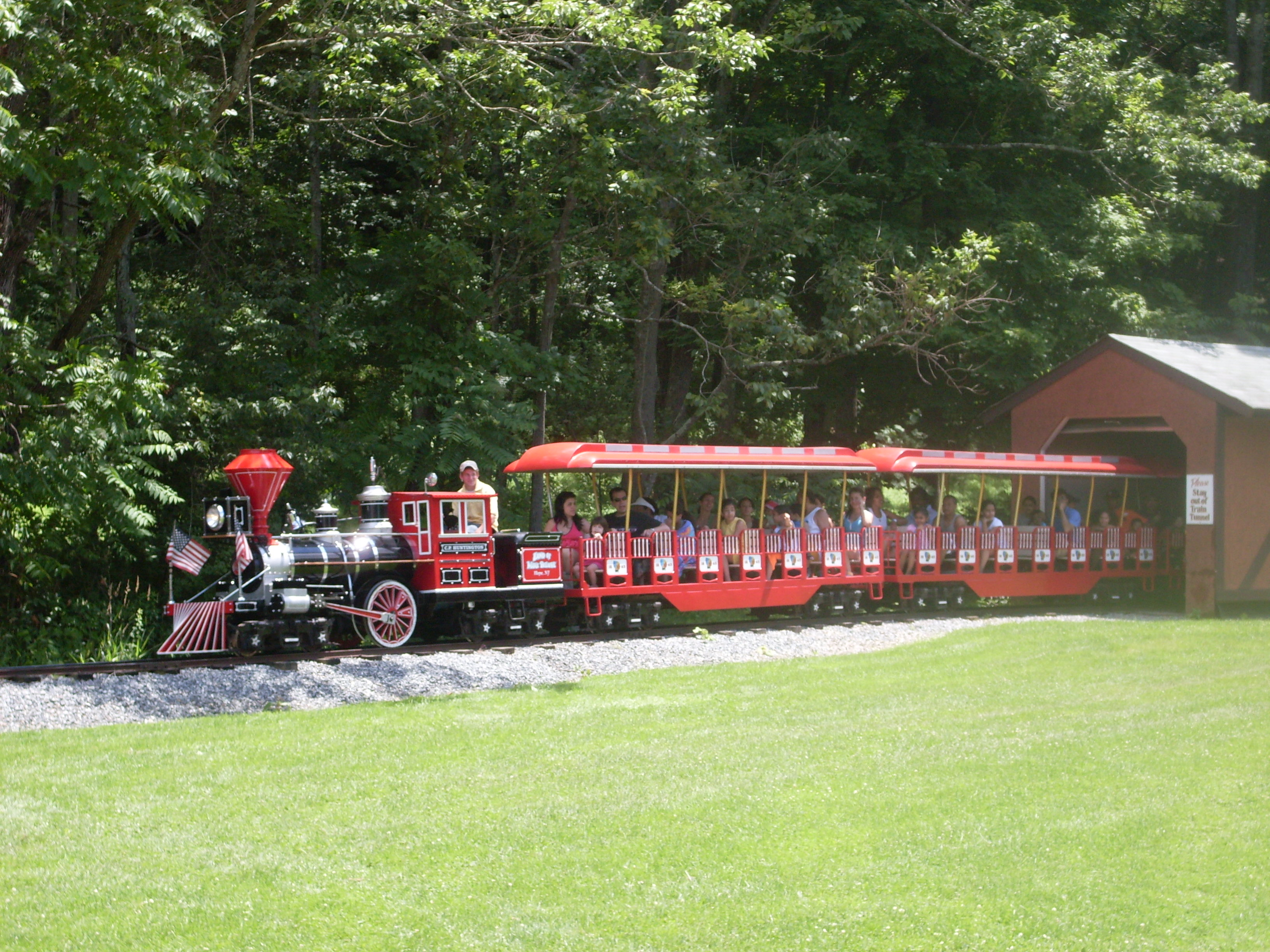
Train at Land of Make Believe
