= Thrilling (company) =

Online vintage clothing marketplace

- Company type: Private
- Industry: Vintage clothing
- Founded: 2018; 8 years ago
- Founder: Shilla Kim-Parker; Brad Mallow
- Headquarters: Los Angeles, California, U.S.
- Key people: Shilla Kim-Parker (CEO); Brad Mallow (CTO)
- Website: shopthrilling.com

Thrilling is an online marketplace for vintage clothing, apparel and home goods. The company partners with independent vintage and secondhand clothing stores that use the platform to list, sell, and ship inventory. Thrilling was founded by Shilla Kim-Parker and Brad Mallow in 2018, In 2021, the company received $8.47 million in series A funding.

Thrilling has partnered with Banana Republic, Academy Award nominated costume designer Ruth E. Carter, and offers a studio service that uses the company's network of stores to find authentic period clothing for film and television productions. In 2020, Thrilling partnered with stylist Zerina Akers of "Black Owned Everything" to curate an online collection of vintage items from black-owned stores.

As of January 2022, Thrilling hosted listings from more than 900 vintage stores in approximately 200 cities and planned to use series A funding to improve technology such as partner store analytics, partially automating the item listing process, and adding personalization for customers shopping on the site.

In May 2022, Thrilling introduced a home goods section that allows thrift shop owners to list and sell vintage home decor items.

== Funding ==
The company raised $100,000 in seed funding in 2018 followed by a $2.1 million seed funding round that closed in July 2019. In a 2021 Series A round led by Prelude Ventures, Thrilling raised $8.5 million. Investors include Prelude Ventures, Elemental Excelerator, Defy, Urban US, Phoenix Rising, Closed Loop, and Congruent Ventures.

== Business model ==
Thrilling's primary competitors include the handmade and vintage craft site Etsy, Etsy's Peer-to-peer social E-commerce subsidiary Depop, and the peer-to-peer sites Poshmark and Tradesy. Most competitors rely on peer-to-peer sales and social media-influenced features, but Thrilling sellers must be Brick and mortar thrift and vintage stores. The company's social media presence and customer support via social media remains less than that of primary competitors and the site lacks customer reviews in large enough numbers to provide adequate ratings from some service categories.

The Thrilling platform allows store owners to list inventory online and handles sale, shipping and returns for a 10% commission. During the first two months of the COVID-19 pandemic these commissions were waived to allow shop owners to maximize income. The Thrilling platform contains technology to assist shop owners in digitizing large inventories, including the ability to use photography to detect an item's size and recommended price.

=== Services ===
- Vintage Studios Services: Thrilling provides access to its network of vintage stores for costume designers looking to purchase or rent clothing for film and television productions. Costume designer Ruth E. Carter is the service's first brand ambassador and will use the service on 2022 productions.
- Thrilling On Demand: In New York City and Los Angeles, Thrilling offers a Vintage Assistant who will photograph and list inventory items for $3 per listing.

== Partnerships and collections ==
- Zerina Akers: Thrilling partnered with Akers and Black Owned Everything to curate a collection of the best items from black-owned stores.
- Ruth E. Carter: Carter served as brand ambassador for Thrilling's Vintage Studios Service.
- Banana Republic: worked with Thrilling to track down classic Banana Republic designs from the 80s and 90s and inspire the company's modern collection. All proceeds from Thrilling's Banana Republic brand collection go to the vintage stores.
- Goodwill Industries: Thrilling partnered with Goodwill and Janelle Monáe's stylist Ali Mandelkorn to curate a collection of clothing from Goodwill SoCal. The first collection included pieces donated by Mel B and Tatyana Ali.
- Mona May: Mona May worked with Thrilling to create a 90s-inspired vintage collection.
