= New Jersey Route 20 =

State highway in Passaic County, New Jersey, US, known as McLean Boulevard

Route 20
- McLean Boulevard

Route information
- Maintained by NJDOT and Passaic County
- Length: 4.15 mi (6.68 km)
- Existed: 1953–present

Major junctions
- South end: G.S. Parkway / US 46 / CR 630 in Clifton
- I-80 in Paterson; Route 4 / Broadway in Paterson
- North end: CR 504 in Paterson

Location
- Country: United States
- State: New Jersey
- Counties: Passaic

Highway system
- New Jersey State Highway Routes; Interstate; US; State; Scenic Byways
← Route 19	→ Route 21

Route 20, known locally as McLean Boulevard, is a state highway that runs 4.15 miles (6.68 km) in New Jersey, United States. It runs along the east side of Paterson, Passaic County, following the west bank of the Passaic River between U.S. Route 46 and River Street (County Route 504), at which point County Route 504 begins. It is a four- to six-lane divided highway for most of its length that runs through residential and commercial areas of Paterson, intersecting with Interstate 80 and Route 4 at interchanges. The northernmost part of the route is a county-maintained one-way pair that follows 1st and 2nd Avenues.

== Route description ==
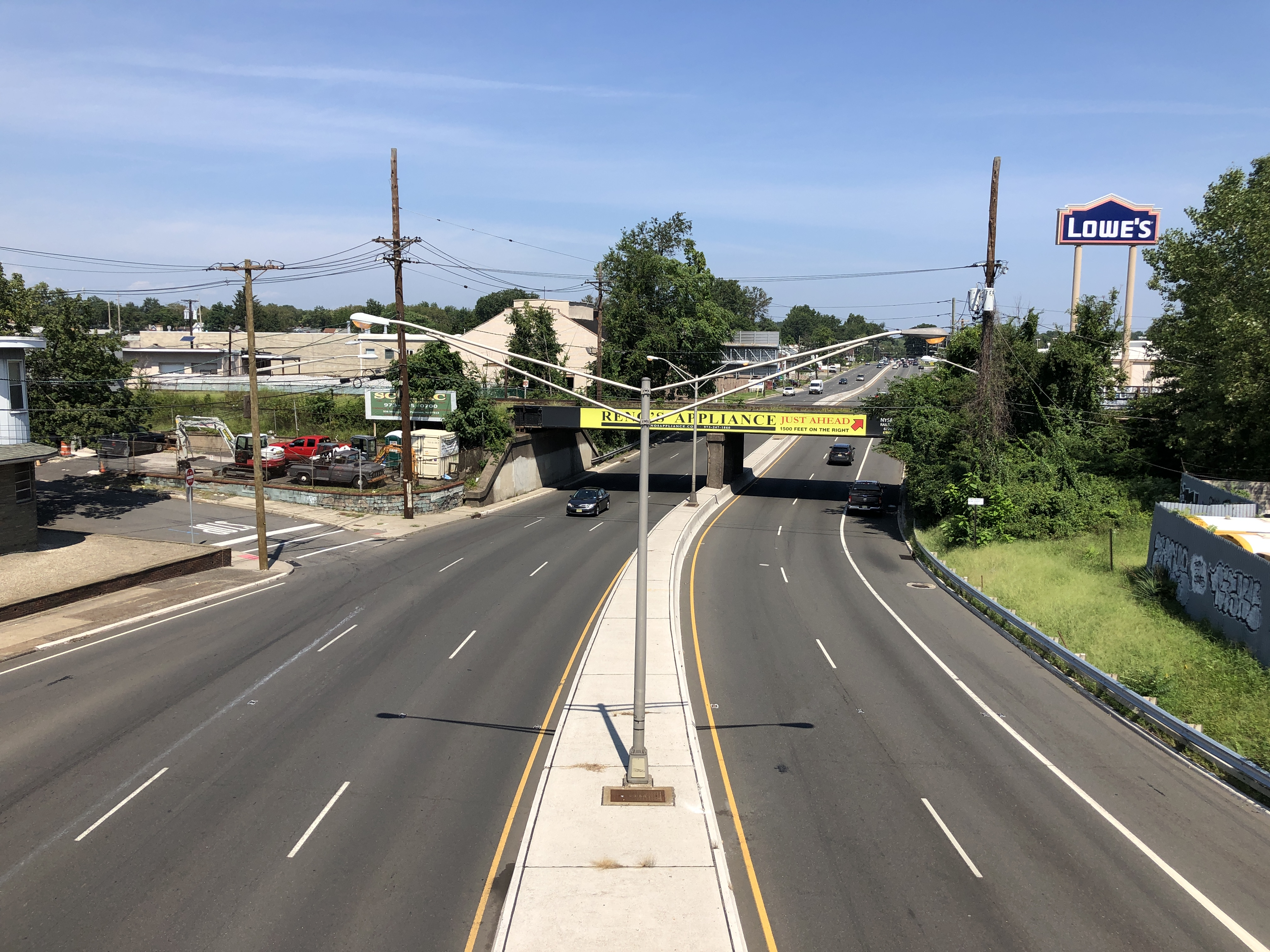
View north along Route 20 just north of I-80 in Paterson

Route 20 begins at an interchange with U.S. Route 46 and County Route 630 (Crooks Avenue) just north of the Garden State Parkway on the border of Clifton and Paterson. The road follows the bend of the Passaic River directly north of Dundee Lake, heading to the north into Paterson as McLean Boulevard, a four-lane freeway. The route runs in between the Passaic River to the east and two large cemeteries to the west before coming to an interchange with Interstate 80 and Market Street. Past Interstate 80, Route 20 becomes a six-lane arterial road that heads under New York, Susquehanna and Western Railway's New Jersey Subdivision line and through a mix of residential and commercial areas.

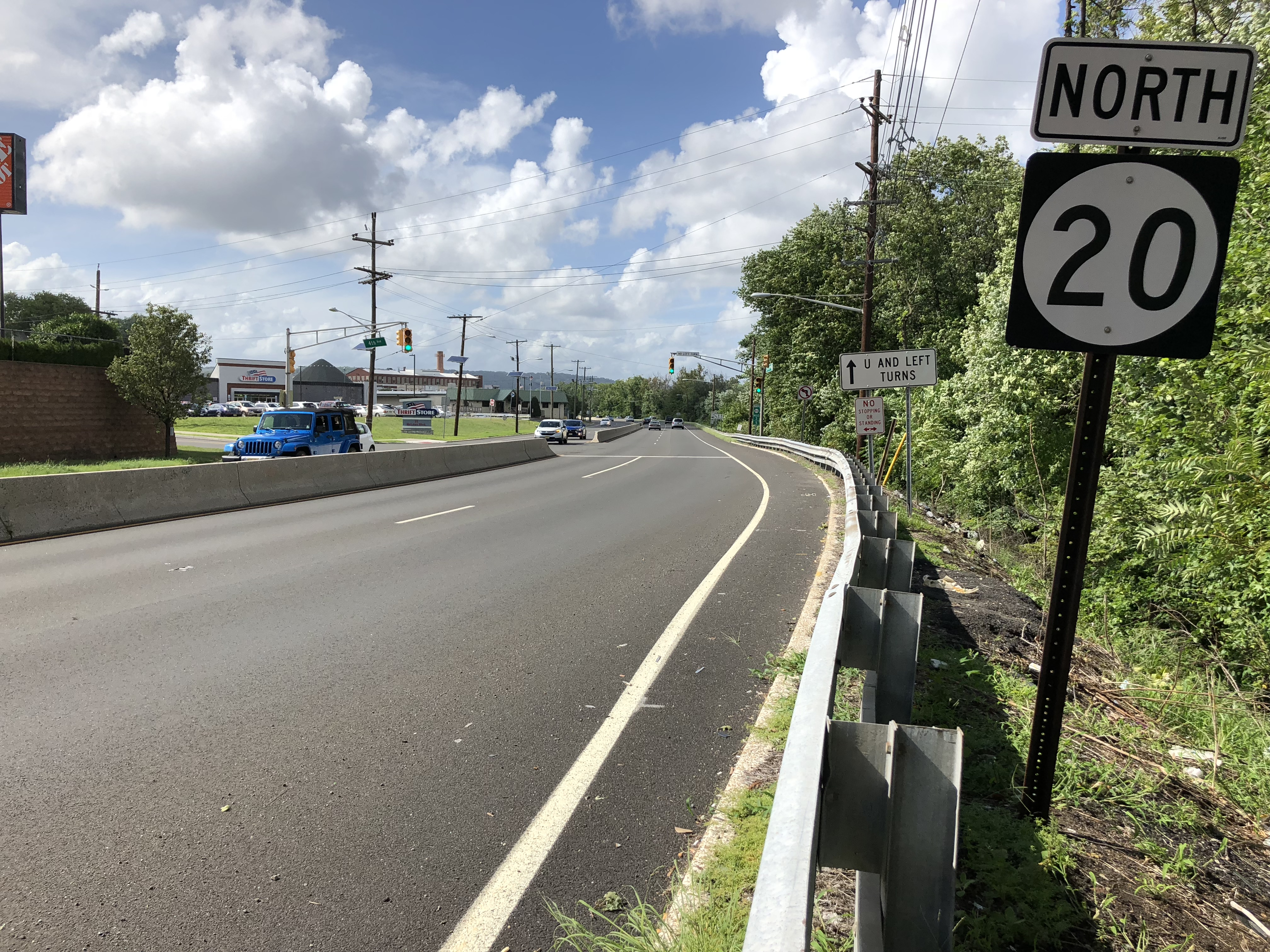
Route 20 northbound past Fair Lawn Avenue in Paterson

The next interchange along the route is for Route 4 (Broadway), with access to both eastbound Route 4 and westbound Broadway from both directions. The road continues further north as a four-lane arterial road, heading through more urbanized areas of Paterson. It crosses County Route 651 (East 33rd Street/Morlot Avenue), which crosses the Passaic River to become County Route 78 (Morlot Avenue) in Bergen County.

Route 20 continues to follow the Passaic River as a 45 mph (72 km/h) road through commercial areas, featuring an intersection with County Route 652 (5th Avenue). Past this intersection, the route proceeds through urban areas, turning west and splitting into a one-way pair. Here, the route becomes county maintained, with the northbound direction following 1st Avenue and the southbound direction following 2nd Avenue before continuing west as County Route 504 (River Street).

== History ==
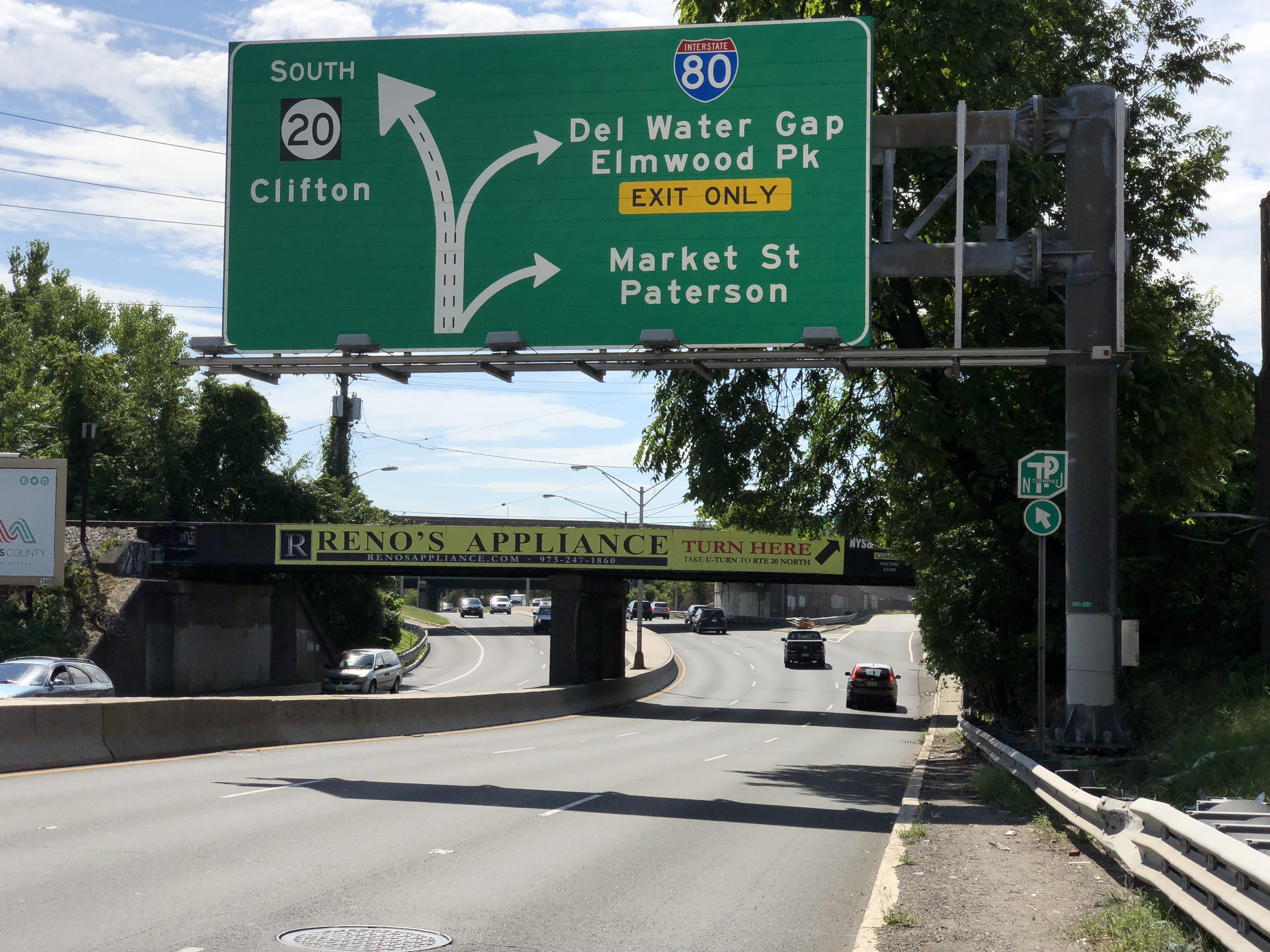
Route 20 southbound at the Market Street exit in Paterson

The present-day routing of Route 20 north of Market Street was legislated in 1927 as part of Route 3, which was to run from the New York border at Greenwood Lake to Secaucus. In addition, the present day routing south of Route 4 was also legislated as part of that route, which was to run from the George Washington Bridge to Cape May. In 1929, the western terminus of Route 3 was moved to Paterson as Route S4B (now Route 208) was planned to replace the alignment of Route 3 from Paterson to the New York border. McLean Boulevard through Paterson was built by the 1930s. A new highway was to be built connecting the two, bypassing the Paterson Plank Road to the north. In the 1953 New Jersey state highway renumbering, Route 20 was legislated to follow the former alignment of Route 3 between Paterson and East Rutherford as Route 3 was moved to the Route S3 freeway that was built between East Rutherford and Clifton. By this point, the Paterson Plank Road was no longer in the state highway system.

Another freeway routing of Route 20 was planned in 1959. This road, which was to be a six-lane freeway called the Paterson Peripheral, was to run from Clifton north to the existing Route 20 in downtown Paterson. This road was completed between the Garden State Parkway and Valley Road by 1969 and north to Interstate 80 in 1975. Upon completion, this road received the Route 20 designation. In 1972, the state once again took over maintenance of the Paterson Plank Road from Route 3 to Route 17 in East Rutherford and made it a part of the route. As it became clear that these three sections of Route 20 would not be connected, especially after the designation of the Great Falls Historic District, they received three different route designations by the 1990s. The freeway section of Route 20 from the Garden State Parkway to Interstate 80 was designated Route 19, the section between Route 3 and Route 17 was designated Route 120, and the Route 20 designation was retained along McLean Boulevard through Paterson. The unfinished section of Route 20 that was to connect McLean Boulevard to Paterson Plank Road was built as a northern extension of the Route 21 freeway in 2000.

== Major intersections ==
The entire route is in Passaic County.

Location	mi	km	Destinations	Notes
Clifton	0.00	0.00	US 46 west – Clifton	Southern terminus
Clifton	0.08	0.13	G.S. Parkway south / US 46 east / Crooks Avenue (CR 630 west)	Southbound exit and northbound entrance; exit 154 on G.S. Parkway
Paterson	0.70	1.13	I-80 – Delaware Water Gap, New York City	Exit 60 on I-80
Paterson	0.81	1.30	Market Street (CR 56) – Elmwood Park, Paterson	
Paterson	0.81	1.30	Northern end of freeway section	
Paterson	1.86	2.99	Route 4 east (Broadway) – New York, Paterson	Interchange; no northbound entrance; western terminus of Route 4
Paterson	4.15	6.68	CR 504 west (River Street)	Continuation west
1.000 mi = 1.609 km; 1.000 km = 0.621 mi: Incomplete access
