= Essex–Hudson Greenway =

Greenway in New Jersey, United States

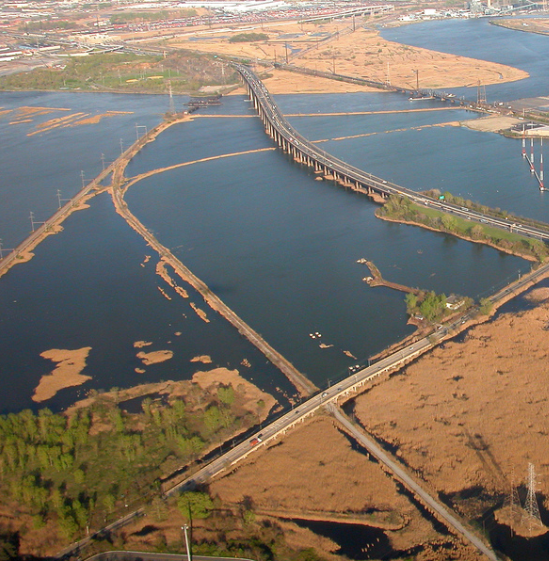
- The right of way (far left) crossing the Meadowlands
- Length: 8.63 miles (13.89 km)
- Location: Essex and Hudson, New Jersey
- Trailheads: Croxton, Jersey City; 40.743342°N 74.067163°W, Bay Street, Montclair; 40.811019°N 74.206749°W
- Use: shared-use

The Greenway, originally the Essex–Hudson Greenway, is a planned state park and greenway in the northeastern New Jersey counties of Essex and Hudson. It will follow an abandoned railroad right-of-way across the New Jersey Meadowlands, over the Hackensack and Passaic rivers, as well pass through densely populated neighborhoods. The nearly 9-mile (14 km) long shared-use linear park/rail trail will encompass about 135 acres (55 ha) and will average 100 feet (30 m) in width. Running between Jersey City and Montclair, it will pass through Secaucus (concurrently with the Hackensack River Greenway), the Arlington neighborhood of Kearny, North Newark, Belleville, Bloomfield and Glen Ridge. Construction began in July 2025 for initial phase in Newark and Kearny.

In 2021, NJ Transit authorized studies for alternative options between the Meadowlands Sports Complex and Secaucus Junction including a bus "Secaucus-Meadowlands Transitway" along the right-of-way. Partial implementation was planned for the 2026 FIFA World Cup, but not carried out.

== Railroad right-of-way ==
In 1878, New York and Greenwood Lake Railway, was created from a consolidation of several smaller railroads, with service provided by the Erie Railroad In 1887, the Erie created a new subsidiary, the Arlington Railroad, to create a new, more direct ROW in the Kearny Meadows between the Hackensack River and Passaic River.

In 1897, it opened the DB Draw over the Hackensack and the WR Draw over the Passaic providing the company a modernized ROW from its Pavonia Terminal through the Long Dock Tunnel and across the Meadows. The eastern portion in Hudson County was also used by the Newark Branch. The property was acquired directly in 1943 by the Erie. In 1960 the Erie merged with the Delaware, Lackawanna and Western Railroad to create the Erie-Lackawanna Railroad and services were consolidated at Hoboken Terminal via the Bergen Tunnels.

Conrail operated commuter rail on the line from 1976 to 1982 on behalf of the New Jersey Department of Transportation to 1982, when New Jersey Transit Rail Operations took over. When Conrail was split in 1999 Norfolk Southern Railway came into possession of the line. NJ Transit provided communter service on its Boonton Line until 2002, when eastern part (Montclair to Hoboken) closed after a new alignment, the Montclair Connection, was built and Montclair-Boonton Line services began. Service at three stations was discontinued. Service at other stations on the line had previously been curtailed.

== Abandonment of ROW and purchase by state ==
Although the ROW was not officially abandoned, proponents of early efforts to create a greenway called the plan the Ice & Iron Rail Trail because of its historical use as a freight line carrying iron and ice from western New Jersey to the Port of New York and New Jersey.

In 2020, Norfolk Southern (NS) officially abandoned an 8.63-mile (13.89 km) section (milepost WD 2.9 to milepost WD 11.5) of the rail line and the Open Space Institute (OSI) reached a preliminary sale agreement with NS for the property. They commissioned Mathews Nielsen Landscape Architects to develop a framework plan, produced in March 2023.

In 2021 NJ Transit authorized a study to use a portion the rail ROW as bus "transitway".

The New Jersey Department of Environmental Protection, which manages state parks and forests, acquired the property on August 19, 2022. The state purchased the ROW from NS for $65 million. It is expected site preparation will begin in 2023, with initial opening about one year later.

A project team of Edward J. Bloustein School of Planning and Public Policy is working with the NJDEP to envision the project.

== Route ==
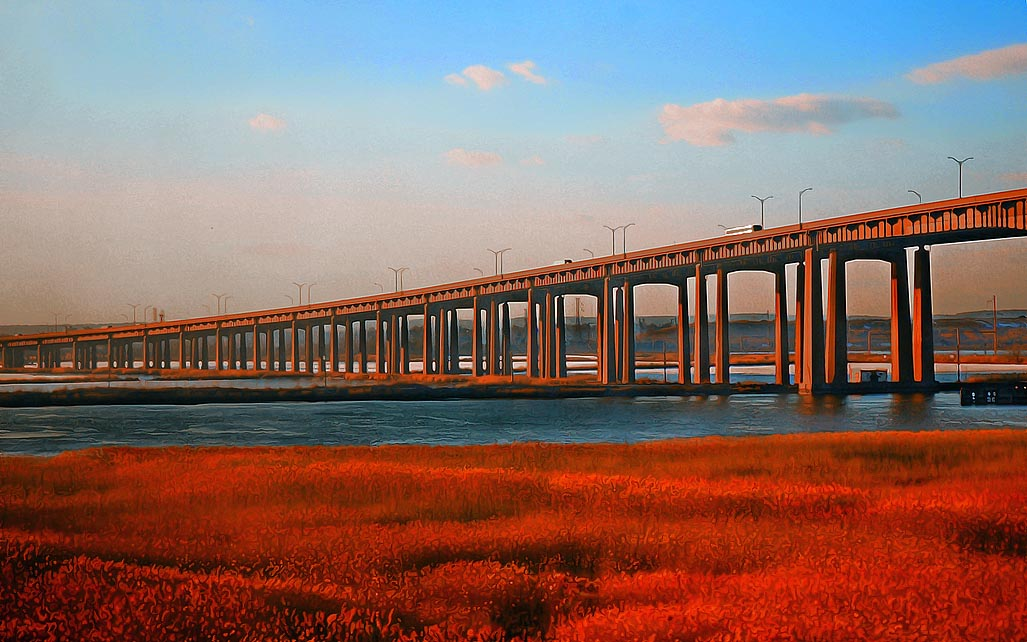
Saw Mill Creek Wildlife Management Area NJ Turnpike Eastern Spur Lewondowski Bridge

At its eastern end the greenway will start in Croxton in Jersey City (40.743342°N 74.067163°W) just west of U.S. Route 1/9, near the Bergen Arches, a disused rail tunnel, with potential connection to the Hudson River Waterfront Walkway. At the west in Montclair it will terminate near the Montclair-Boonton Line near Bay Street station (40.811019°N 74.206749°W). In Secaucus it will run concurrently with the planned route of the Hackensack River Greenway. In Essex County a portion would run concurrently with the September 11th National Memorial Trail. The East Coast Greenway in would be partially re-routed to align with new greenway.

- Saint Peter's Cemetery
- site of the demolished Hudson Generating Station
- Penhorn Creek
- Riverbend Wetlands Preserve
- Portal Bridge (Northeast Corridor – Amtrak and NJ Transit)
- Lewondowski Bridge – New Jersey Turnpike Eastern Spur
- Laurel Hill County Park
- DB Draw
- Hackensack River
- Saw Mill Creek Wildlife Management Area/Kearny Brackish Marsh
- New Jersey Turnpike Western Spur
- Saw Mill Creek Mud Flats
- Belleville Turnpike
- Arlington station site
- West Arlington station site
- Kearny Riverbank Park
- Passaic River
- WR Draw
- McCarter Highway
- Woodside
- North Newark station site
- Forest Hill
- Second River
- Branch Brook Park
- Rowe Street station site
- Garden State Parkway
- Bloomfield Cemetery
- Benson Street station site

== See also ==
- List of rail trails in New Jersey
- List of New Jersey state parks

== Gallery ==
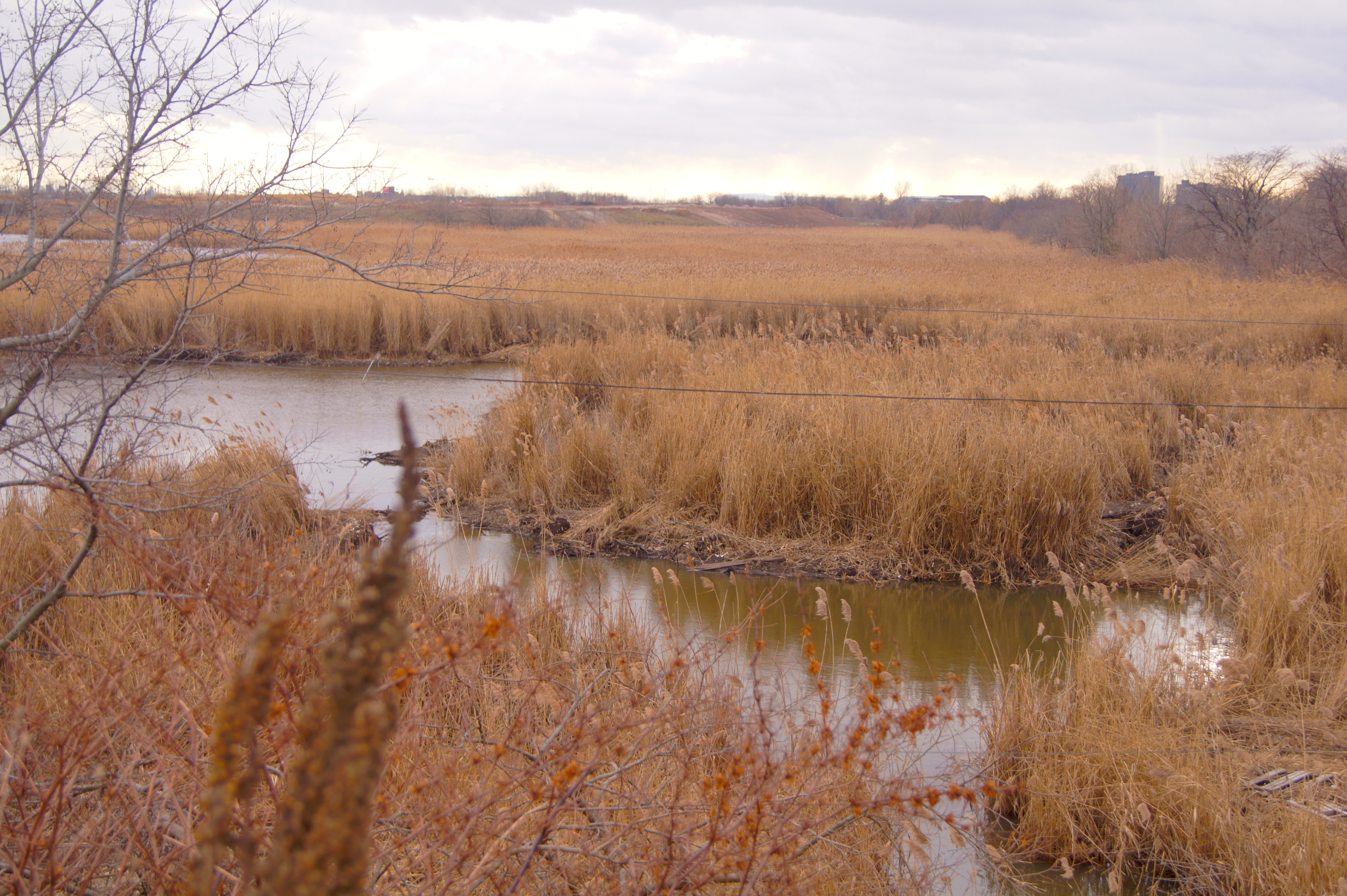
Kearny Meadows

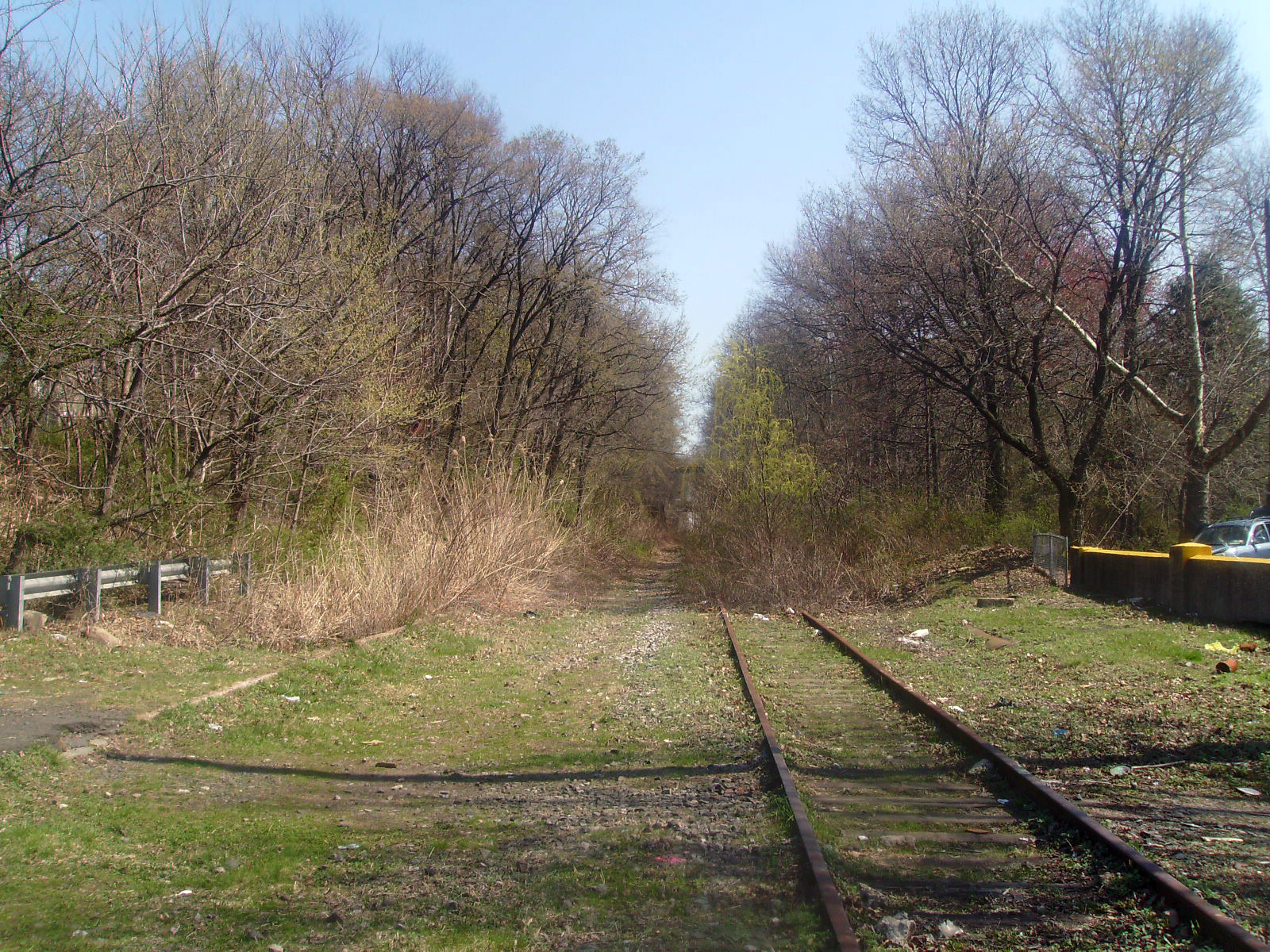
West Arlington station site

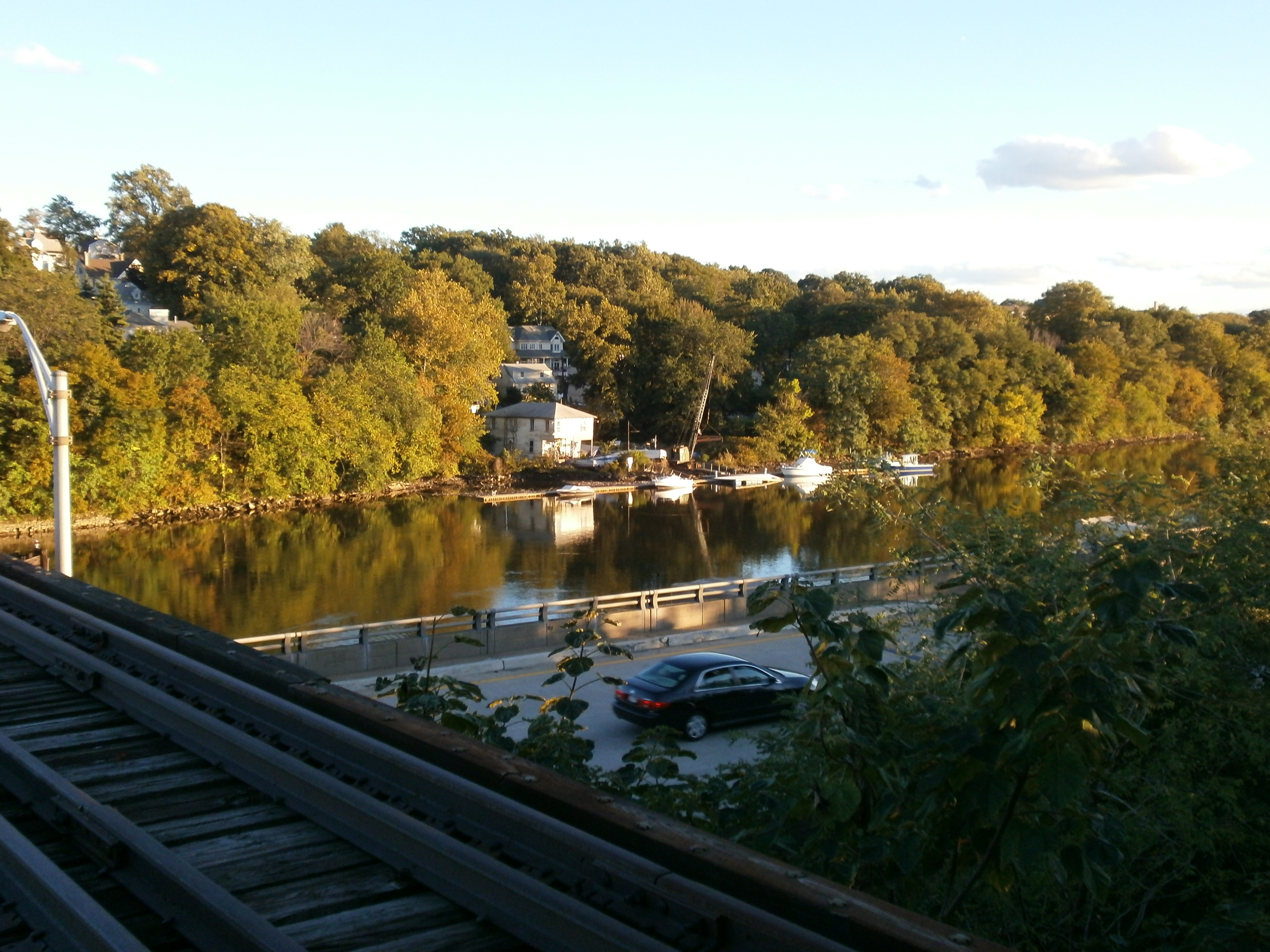
WR Draw over Riverbank Park, Passaic River, and McCarter Highway

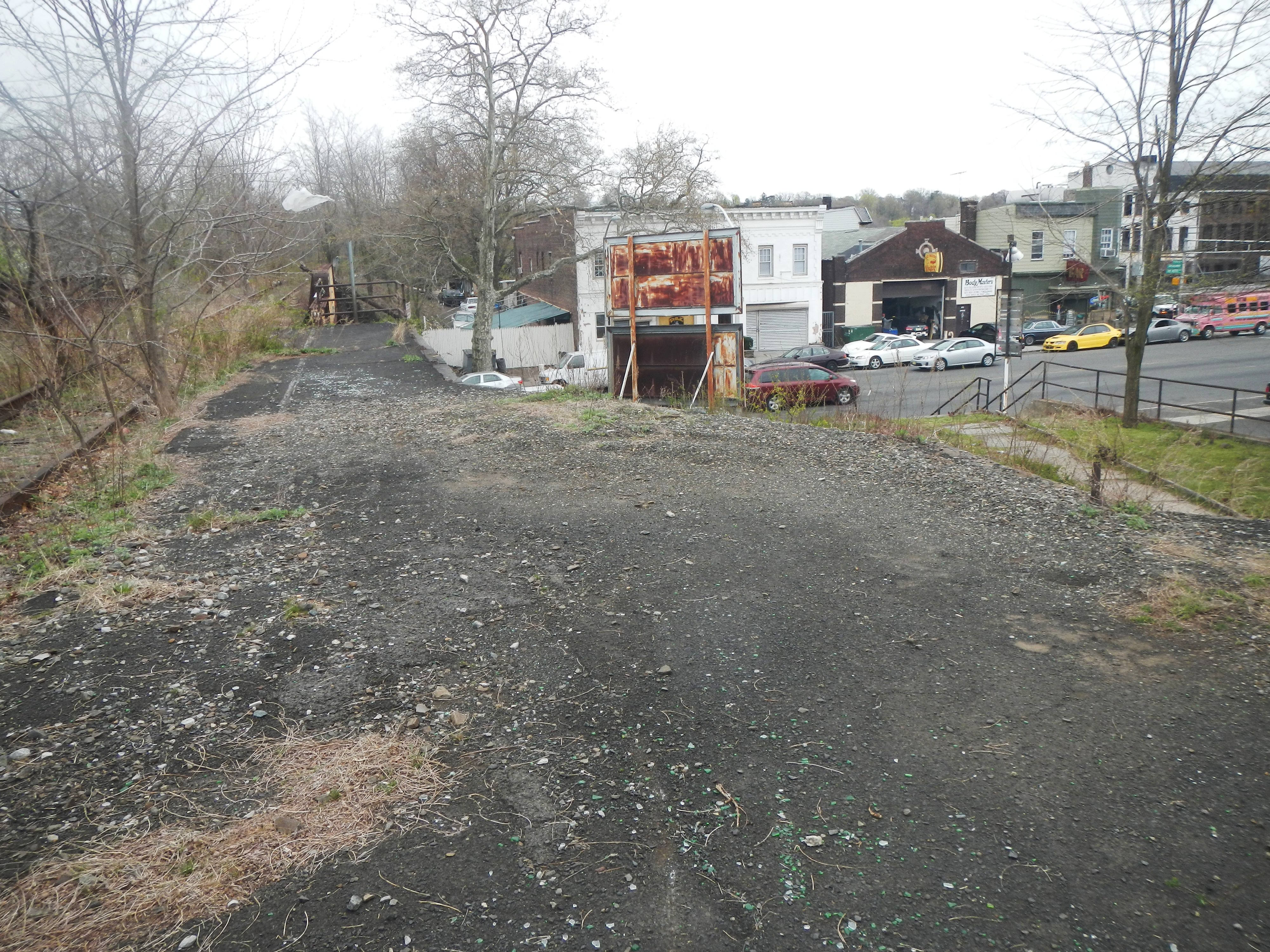
Broadway North Newark

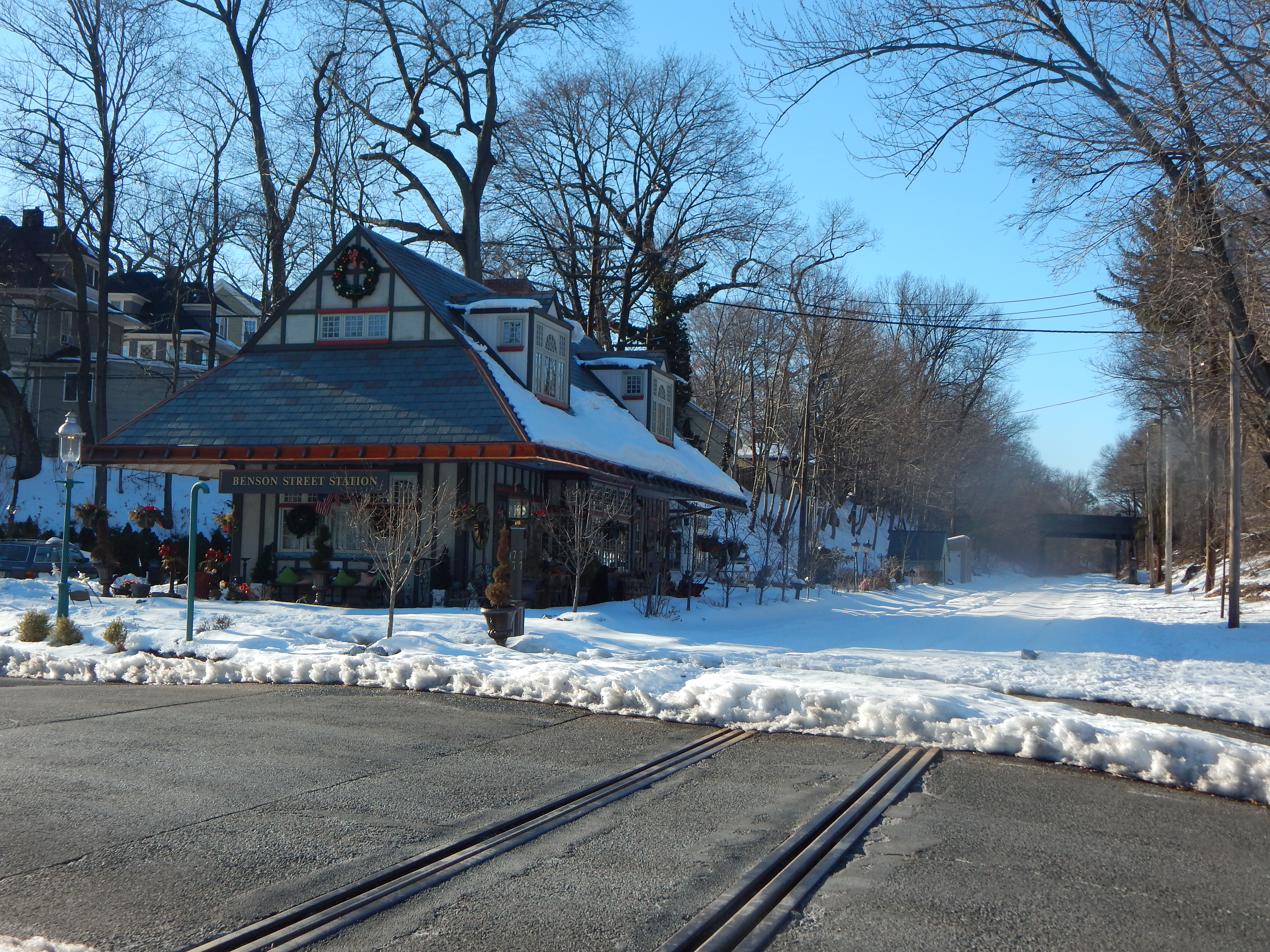
Benson Street station site

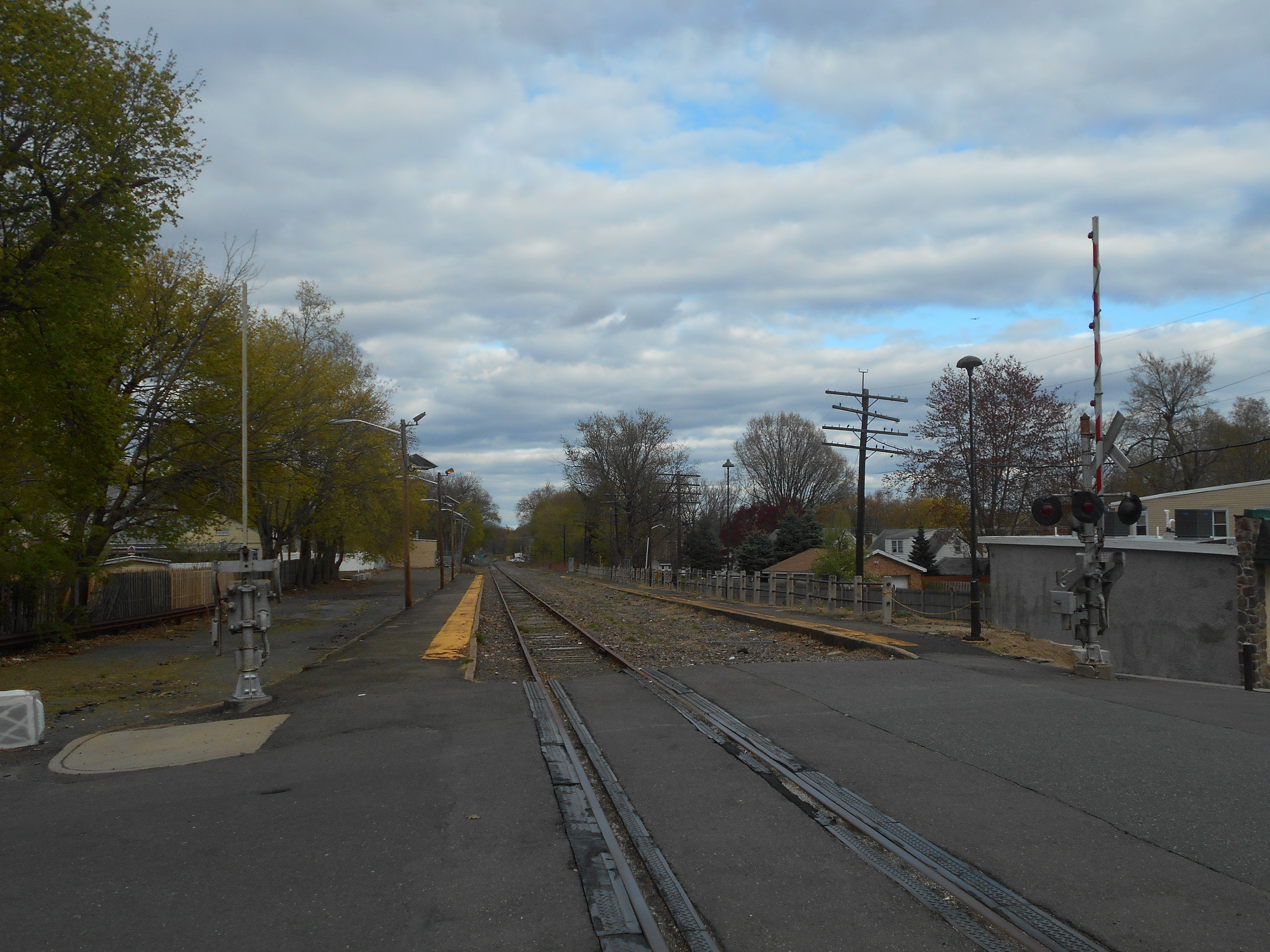
ROW at Rowe Street station site
