= WR Draw =

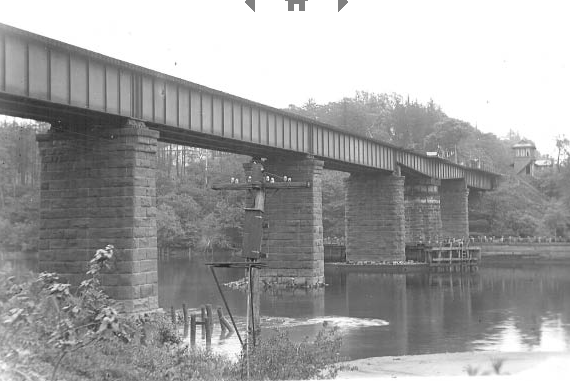
- View from North Newark to West Arlington
- Coordinates: 40°46′36″N 74°09′00″W
- Carries: New York and Greenwood Lake Railway (1897-1966); Boonton Line (1963-2002)
- Crosses: Passaic River
- Locale: Newark and Kearny, New Jersey
- Other name(s): West Arlington Drawbridge, Bridge 7.57
- Owner: New Jersey Transit
- Preceded by: Midland Bridge

Characteristics
- Design: Swing bridge
- Clearance above: 40 feet (12 m)

History
- Opened: 1897
- Closed: 2002

WR Draw is an out-of-service railroad bridge crossing the Passaic River between Newark and the Arlington section of Kearny, New Jersey. The plate girder rim-bearing swing bridge, originally built in 1897 and modified in 1911 and 1950, is the 14th bridge from the river's mouth at Newark Bay and is 8.1 miles (13.0 km) upstream from it. Last used for regular passenger service in 2002, it is welded in closed position as its height is not considered a hazard to navigation.

The lower seventeen miles (27 km) of the ninety-mile (140 km) long Passaic River downstream of the Dundee Dam is tidally influenced and navigable. Rail service across the river was generally oriented to bringing passengers and freight from the points west over the Hackensack Meadows to Bergen Hill, where tunnels and cuts provided access terminals on the Hudson River.

== History ==
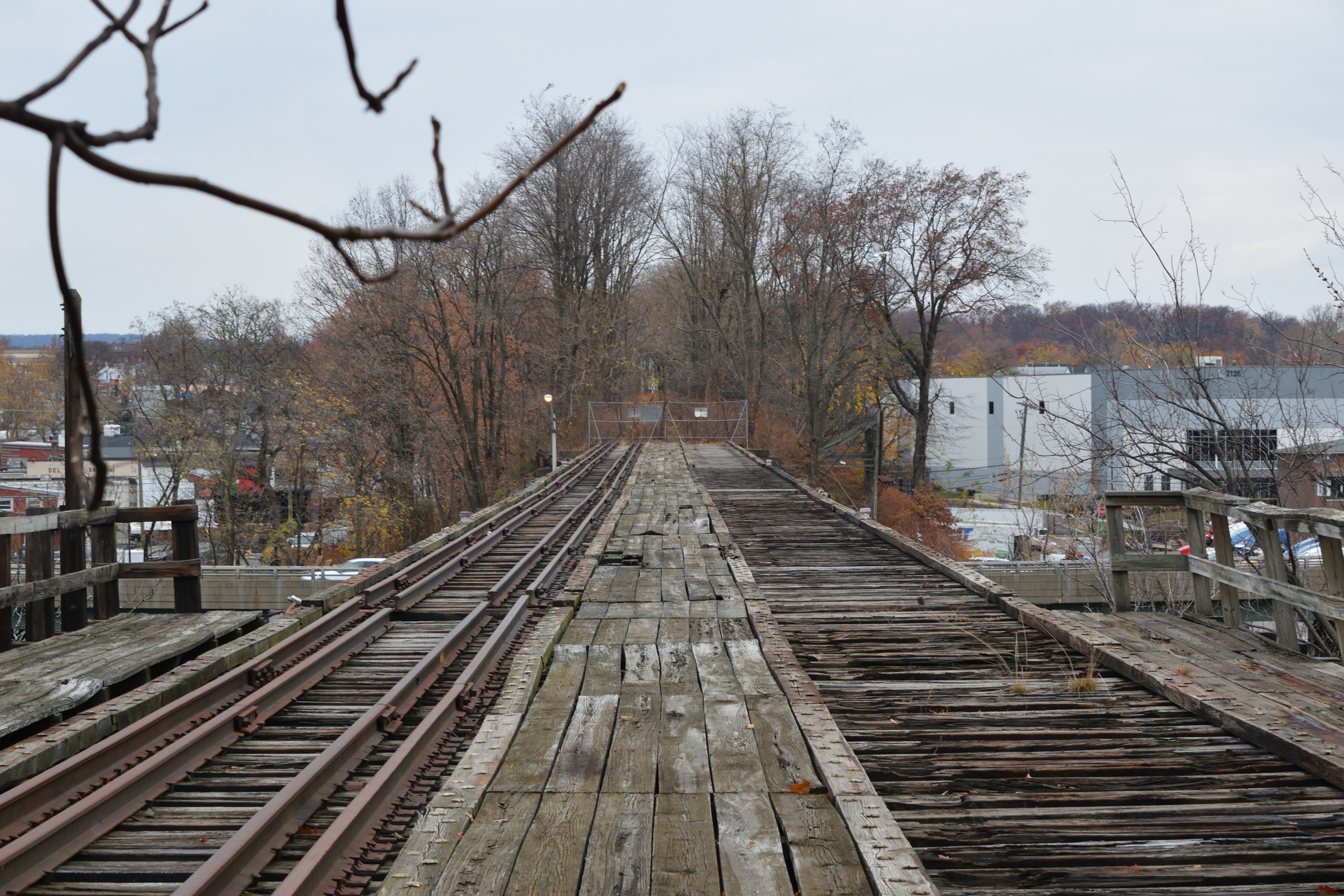
View to Newark

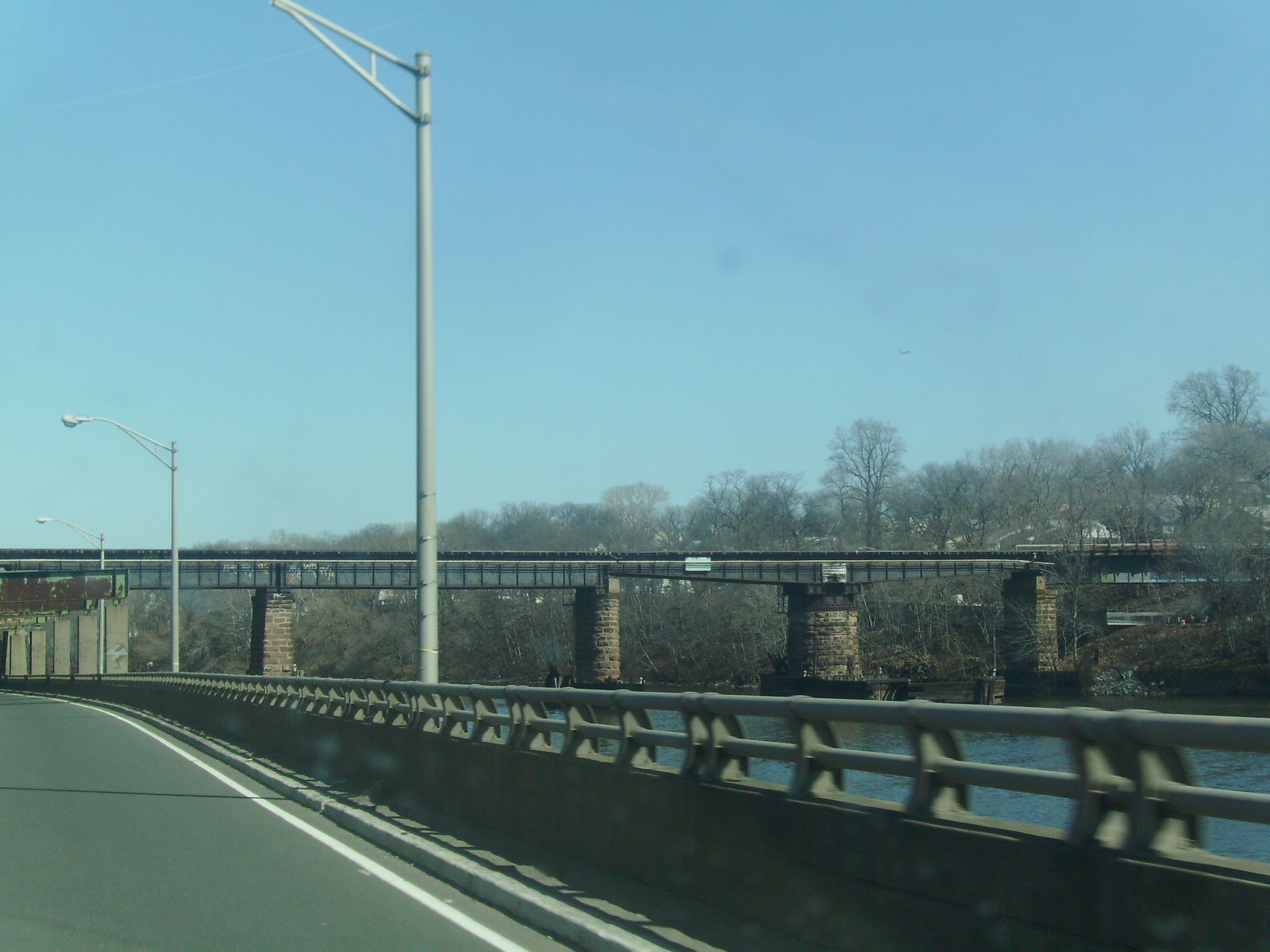
The bridge's substructure was modified to accommodate NJ Route 21, which passes underneath the bridge on the west end.

An alignment crossing the river at Arlington and North Newark was part of a grander scheme developed in the 1860s by the New York, Oswego, and Midland Railroad to run lines from Jersey City into northern New Jersey and beyond to Western New York, also opening up new areas for suburban development (including Belleville, just north of the current bridge's western end). Originally, the plan called for incorporating the Montclair Railway which had been established in 1867. Ultimately that plan was scuttled as a route was established farther north connecting to the New Jersey Midland Railway and Hudson Connecting Railway.

Nonetheless, expansion on the Montclair Railway continued and a right-of-way (ROW) over the river was established circa 1872-1874, The WR Draw's predecessor was known as the Midland Bridge, a name recalled in Midland Avenue which descends from Passaic Street to the former West Arlington Station. The line ran between Sterling Forest at the New York state line to Croxton, Jersey City. The financially unstable Montclair Railway went into receivership, and in 1875 became the Montclair and Greenwood Lake Railway In 1878 the company was re-organized as the New York and Greenwood Lake Railway (NYGL), under control of Erie Railroad.

In 1887, the Erie created a new subsidiary, the Arlington Railroad, to create a new ROW in the Kearny Meadows which ran more directly to the WR Draw once the line had passed through the Long Dock Tunnel and crossed the Hackensack River. In 1889, it opened the DB Draw over the river, providing the company a modernized ROW from its Pavonia Terminal for use by both the NYGL and the Newark Branch, which crossed the Passaic on the NX Bridge at the southern end of Kearny. Within Erie, the NX was known as Bridge 8.04, which indicated the number of miles from the Jersey City waterfront terminal. The WR Draw was known as Bridge 7.57.

In the mid-1890s, the Erie greatly expanded the infrastructure and service on the Greenwood Lake, taking over the Watchung Railway in 1895 and the Caldwell Railway and the Roseland Railway in 1897, the former becoming the Orange Branch and the latter two, the Caldwell Branch. The WR Draw was modified in 1911 when the Erie opened a new tunnel-cut, the Bergen Arches, in Jersey City, creating the Penhorn Creek Railroad to run through it and make connections to its lines on the west side of the Hudson Palisades. The bridge was again modified in the 1950s when New Jersey Route 21 was constructed under its west end.

In 1943, in a major re-organization, the New York and Greenwood Lake as well as other subsidiaries were absorbed into the Erie. In 1960 the Erie and the Delaware, Lackawanna, and Western (DL&W) merged, consolidating at Hoboken Terminal. In 1963, in conjunction with the construction of Interstate 80 in Paterson, the combined Erie Lackawanna Railroad's Boonton Line was rerouted over the WR Draw.

Service over the bridge was diminished in phases. Numerous stations were taken out of use and the mainline was retracted in 1935. By 1966 service on the New York and Greenwood Lake was terminated. In 1976, the Erie-Lackawanna was taken over by Conrail which continued to run Boonton Line trains over the bridge. New Jersey Transit Rail Operations (NJT) took over Conrail's commuter lines in 1983. With the 2002 opening of the Montclair Connection, NJT re-routed the Boonton Line to its Montclair Branch east of Montclair, thus bypassing the ROW to the bridge. Service was discontinued to Rowe Street, Benson Street and Arlington stations. DB Draw over the Hackensack River was also taken out of use and left in the open position.

In 2020, Norfolk Southern Railway (NS), which had acquired the line in 1999 from Conrail, officially abandoned an 8.63-mile (13.89 km) section (milepost WD 2.9 to milepost WD 11.5) of the rail line. and the Open Space Institute (OSI) reached a preliminary sale agreement with NS for the property. The New Jersey Department of Environmental Protection, which manages state parks and forests, acquired the property on August 19, 2022. The state purchased the ROW from NS for $65 million for development of a new state park called the Essex–Hudson Greenway.

== See also ==
- Timeline of Jersey City area railroads
- List of crossings of the Lower Passaic River
- List of bridges, tunnels, and cuts in Hudson County, New Jersey
