= Arlington, New Jersey =

Populated place in Hudson County, New Jersey, US

- Unincorporated community
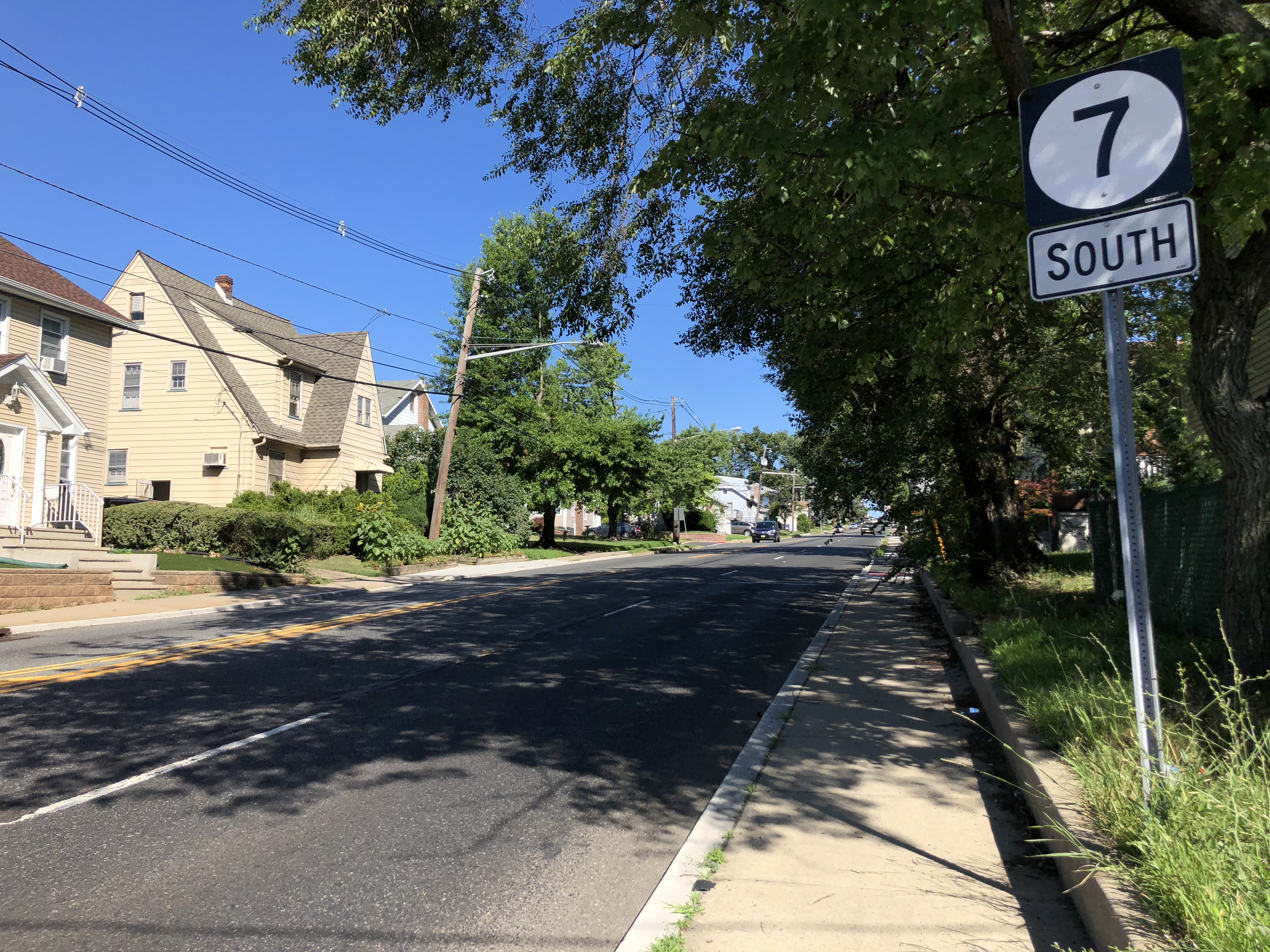
- At the border with North Arlington

- Location of Arlington in Hudson County Inset: Location of county within the state of New Jersey
- Coordinates: 40°46′39″N 74°08′18″W
- Country: United States
- State: New Jersey
- County: Hudson
- Town: Kearny
- Elevation: 118 ft (36 m)
- Area code: 201
- GNIS feature ID: 874373

Arlington is a neighborhood in Kearny in the western part of Hudson County, in the U.S. state of New Jersey.

== Geography ==
Arlington is located in the northwestern part of Kearny on the ridge between the New Jersey Meadowlands and the Passaic River. New Jersey Route 7, known as the Belleville Turnpike, creates the border with the Bergen County town of North Arlington, which takes its name in relation to this community. Kearny Riverbank Park runs along the neighborhood's Passaic River shore. Arlington Memorial Park cemetery is located on Schuyler Avenue.

== History ==
The community was the location of the Arlington and West Arlington stations on New York and Greenwood Lake Railway, just east of the WR Draw over the river. These communities were part of NJ Transit's Boonton Line, which was discontinued with the opening of the Montclair Connection and Secaucus Junction. The planned Essex - Hudson Greenway will use the right of way.

Arlington's history dates back to its founding in the early 19th century, when it served as a vital stop on the region's transportation routes. As the town developed, it became a center for manufacturing and trade, contributing to the growth of the local economy. In the 1900s, the New Jersey Post Card Company in adjacent Newark issued postcards to promote the area as a residential district.

== Tourism ==
The town is home to several parks and green spaces. Kearny Riverbank Park runs along the neighborhood's Passaic River shore. Arlington Memorial Park cemetery is located on Schuyler Avenue.

== Notable person ==
- Leo Kiely, professional baseball player who lived in Arlington after his playing career was over.
