= North Newark station =

Former railway station in New Jersey, United States

North Newark

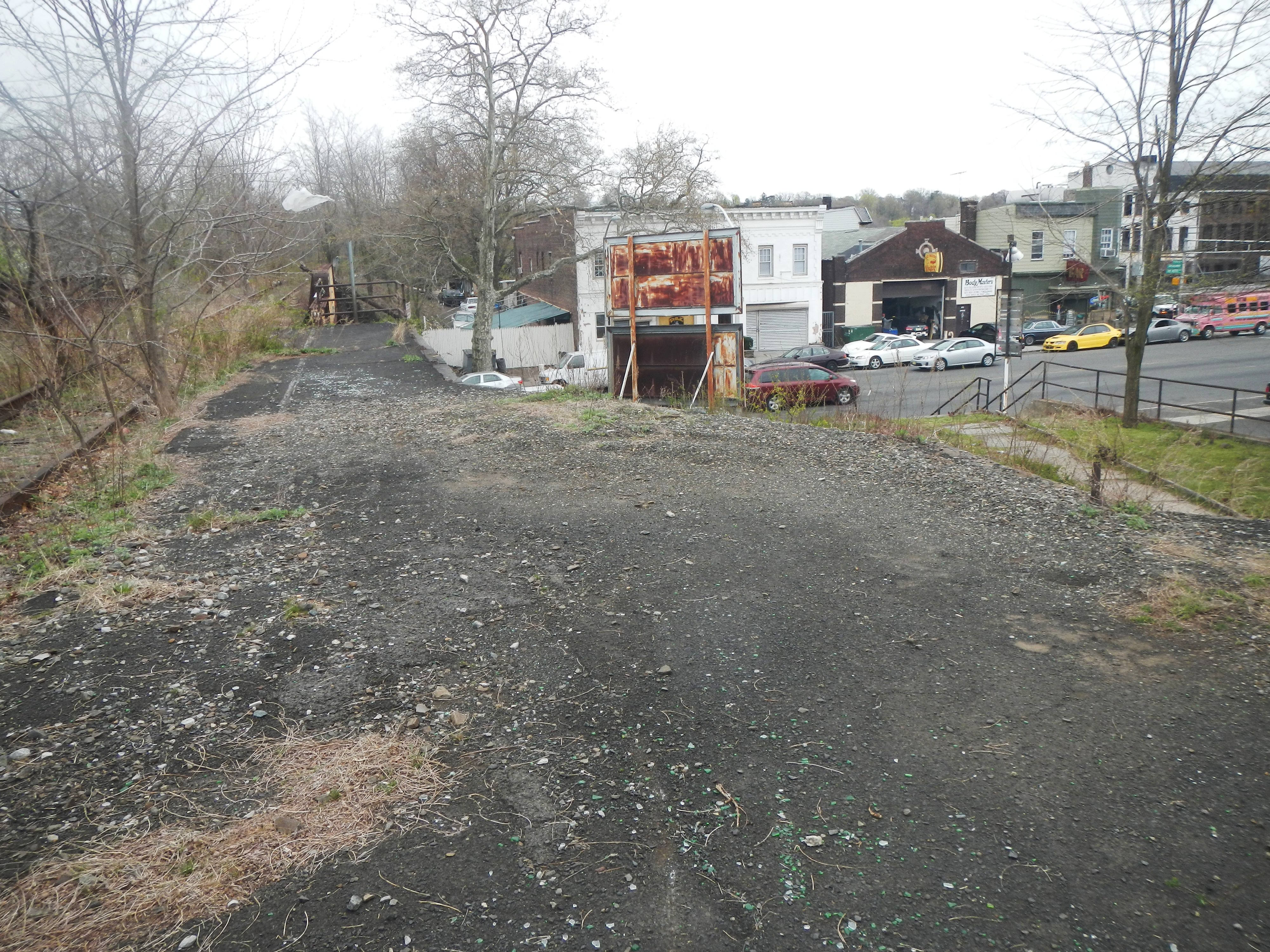
- The former eastbound station platform at North Newark station in April 2013.

General information
- Location: Broadway at Verona Avenue, Newark, New Jersey
- Coordinates: 40.780010°N 74.156233°W
- Line: Boonton Line
- Platforms: 2 low-level side platforms
- Tracks: 2

Construction
- Platform levels: 1

Other information
- Station code: 1705 (Erie Railroad)

History
- Opened: January 1, 1873; 153 years ago
- Closed: April 26, 1986; 40 years ago
- Rebuilt: 1889
- Electrified: N/A

Key dates
- August 1889: 1873 station depot razed
- June 1970: 1889 station depot burned

Former services
| Preceding station | NJ Transit | Following station |
|---|---|---|
| Rowe Street toward Hackettstown | Boonton Line | Arlington toward Hoboken |
| Preceding station | Erie Railroad | Following station |
| Forest Hill toward Sterling Forest | New York and Greenwood Lake Railway | West Arlington toward Jersey City |
Location

North Newark was a former commuter railroad train station in the Woodside section of the city of Newark, Essex County, New Jersey. Located at the intersection of Broadway and Verona Avenue, the station served trains on NJ Transit's Boonton Line, which operated at the time between Netcong and Hoboken Terminal. The station consisted of two low-level side platforms, accessible by stairs from Broadway. The next station to the east was Arlington in nearby Kearny, with the next station to the west being Rowe Street in Bloomfield.

Railroad service through northern part Newark began on January 1, 1873 with the introduction of the Montclair Railway between Jersey City and Monks Castle in West Milford. The station was 7 miles (11 km) west of Jersey City, servicing fifteen trains. Operation of the railroad changed hands multiple times, but in 1889, the Erie Railroad, which operated the line, built a depot on the platform. This new station was a combination passenger facility and residential dwelling. The station depot at North Newark burned in June 1970, but the firefighters rescued the canopy of the depot, which the railroad repurposed into the main facilities. NJ Transit continued operation of the station until April 26, 1986 when it was closed. There was also a station at Forest Hill near Manchester Place and Verona Avenue, which was west of North Newark station.

== History ==
Railroad service through the Woodside section of Newark began to come together with the incorporation of the Montclair Railway on March 18, 1867 to build a railway from the Hudson River waterfront at Jersey City to the municipality of Montclair in Essex County. The railway opened on January 1, 1873, when the 43 miles (69 km) railroad opened service from Jersey City to Monks Castle in West Milford. Two stations were established in the city of Newark, one at North Newark and one then known as Montgomery.

The railroad demolished the 1873-built station depot at North Newark in August 1889 for the construction of a new station depot on the site. The new station was a three-story wooden depot on the eastbound platform. This depot would include the waiting room and ticket office, along with a residential dwelling.

A trolley opened in July 1894 that connected rail service at North Newark station to the center of Newark at Broad and Market Streets as competition to the Delaware, Lackawanna and Western Railroad and its service at Broad Street Station.

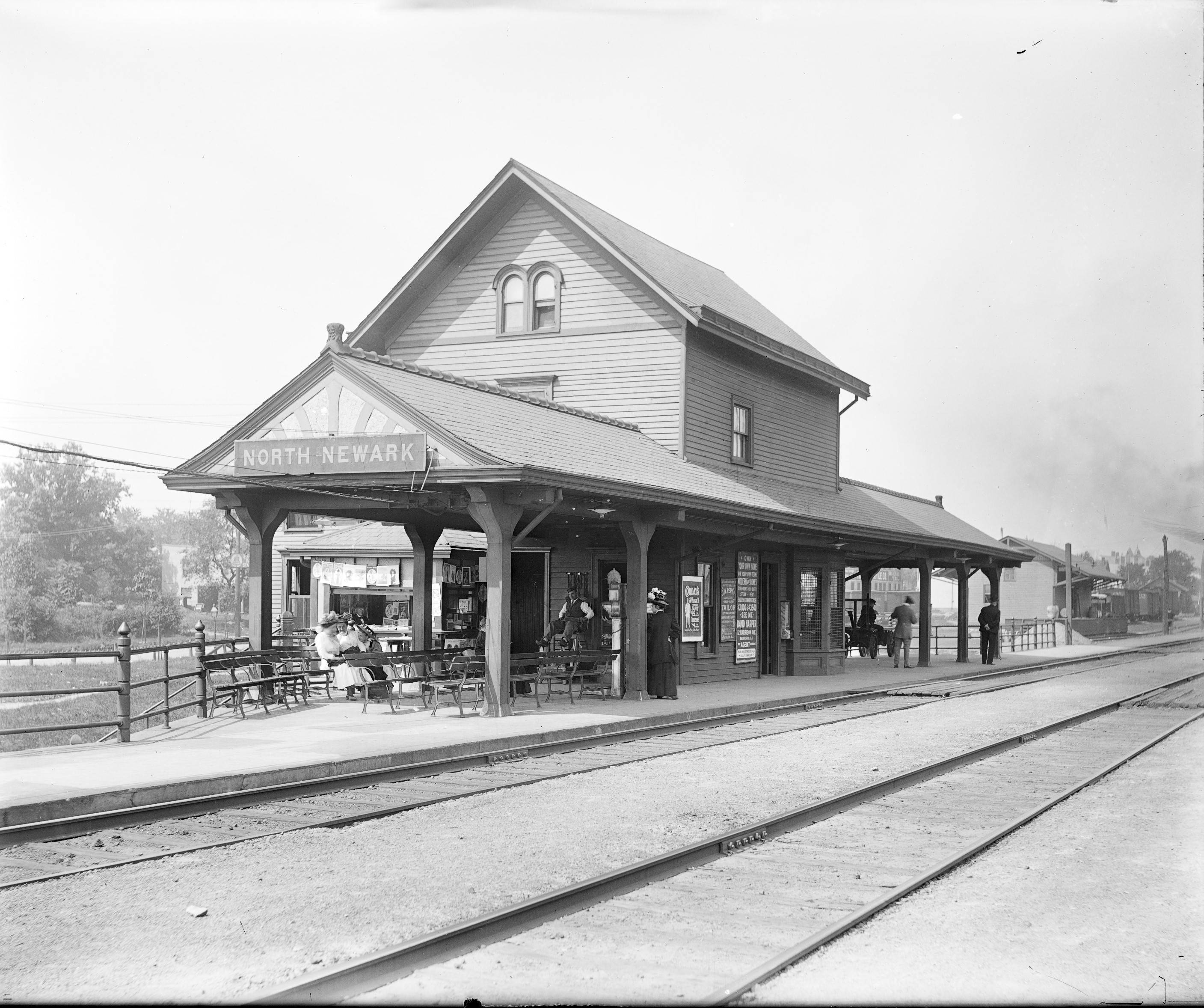
North Newark station, c. 1907-1912

On November 29, 1962, it was announced that the Greenwood Lake Division and the former Delaware, Lackawanna and Western Railroad Boonton Branch would be merged, operating service between Hoboken Terminal and Dover. Dwight R.G. Palmer, the Commissioner of the New Jersey State Highway Department, noted that North Newark station would benefit from the merge, opening access to those who commuted to jobs in Newark. On March 6, 1963, Palmer announced that new train schedules had been approved for the merged service. The new service began on October 27, 1963.

The 1889-built North Newark station depot caught fire in June 1970. The majority of the station was lost, save for the canopy overhanging the platform. The Erie Lackawanna Railroad repainted and repurposed the canopy for railroad service. The site of the depot would also be repurposed, but for a railroad transmission tower.

On March 17, 1986, NJ Transit announced that they would discontinue service at the North Newark station on April 26 due to low ridership along with the Grant Avenue station in Plainfield, Union County.

Passenger service on the railroad ended on September 20, 2002 when NJ Transit prepared to open the Montclair Connection, which would tie the Boonton Line and the Montclair Branch together at Bay Street station. As a result, the three active stations were closed. After being used as a freight line, the state of New Jersey acquired an 8.6 miles (13.8 km) stretch of the former Boonton Line at the cost of $65 million on August 19, 2022 for conversion to a state park, the Essex–Hudson Greenway. The station site at North Newark, which used to have the two remaining platforms and overgrown tracks, has become openly replaced by expansion of a local junkyard.

== Bibliography ==
- Catlin, George L. (1873). Homes on the Montclair Railway, for New York Business Men. A Description of the Country Adjacent to the Montclair Railway, Between Jersey City and Greenwood Lake. New York, New York: Montclair Railway Company.
- Yanosey, Robert J. (2006). Erie Railroad Facilities (In Color). Vol. 1: New Jersey. Scotch Plains, New Jersey: Morning Sun Books Inc. ISBN 1582481830.
