= Woodside, Newark =

Area of Newark, New Jersey, United States

Coordinates: 40.768°N 74.166°W

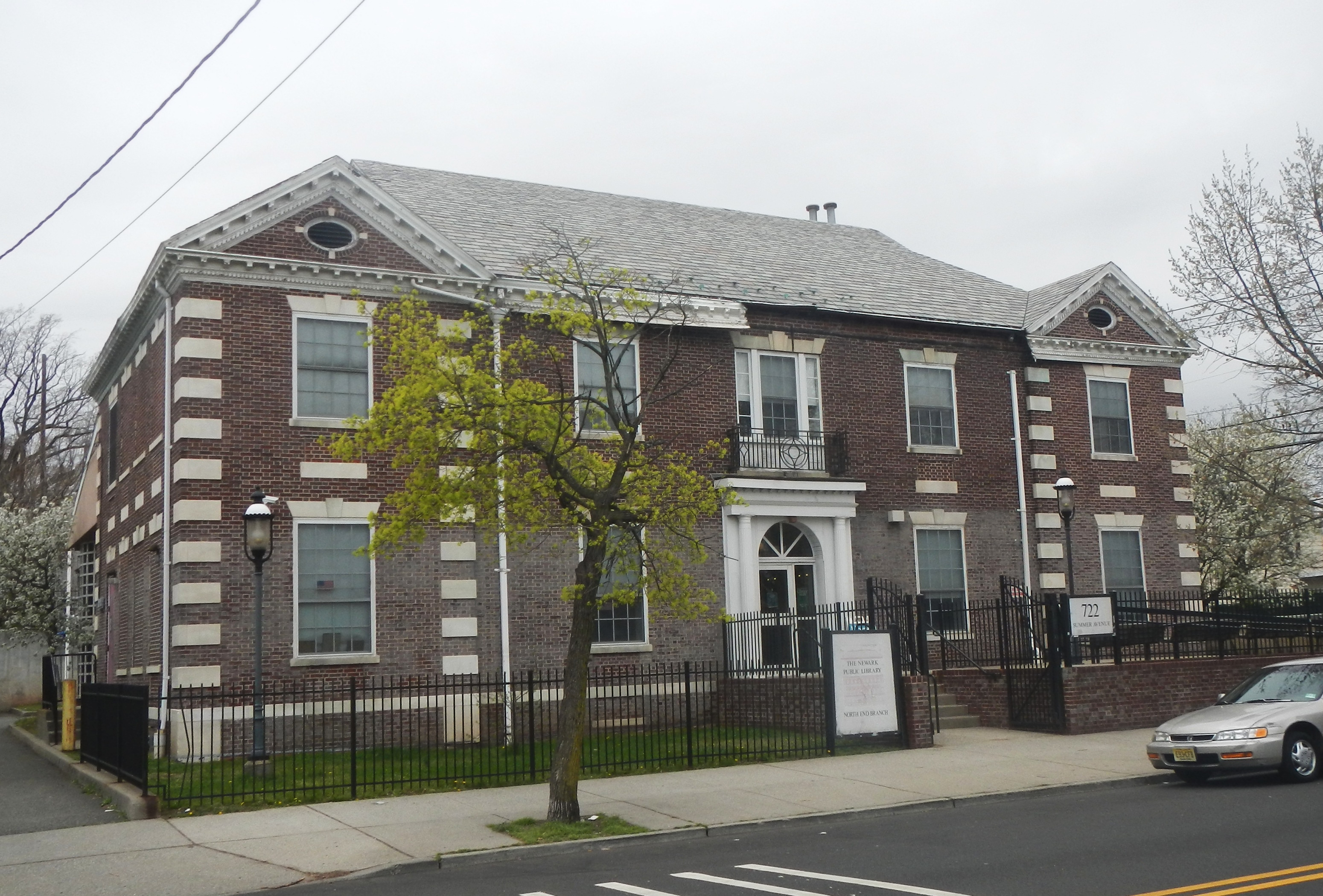
Newark Public Library North End Branch

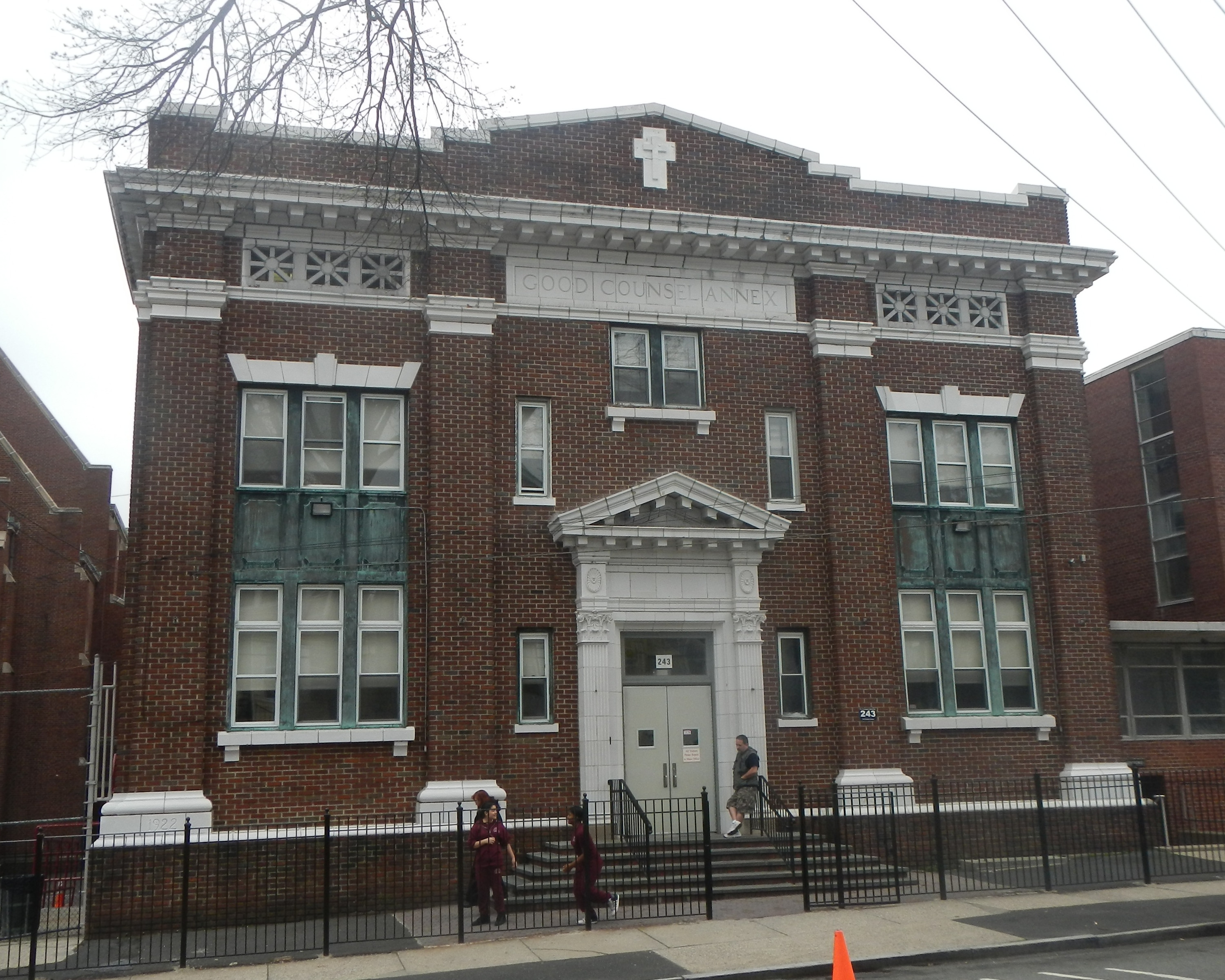
Lady of Good Counsel

Woodside is a small neighborhood in the North Ward of Newark, New Jersey that is part of the larger North Broadway district in the northeastern section of city. It is located on the west bank of Passaic River, along which runs New Jersey Route 21. Mount Pleasant Cemetery lies to the south and Forest Hill is to the west. The town of Bellville shares its northern border at the Second River.

== History ==
=== Woodside Township ===
Woodside Township was a township that existed in Essex County, New Jersey, United States, from 1869 to 1871. Woodside was incorporated as a township by an Act of the New Jersey Legislature on March 24, 1869, from portions of Belleville Township On April 5, 1871, almost two weeks after its second anniversary, the township was dissolved, and its territory was absorbed by Belleville and Newark.

=== Cockloft Hall ===
In the early 1800s Washington Irving, his oldest brother William, James Kirke Paulding a few friends formed a group known as the "Lads of Kilkenny", described as “a loosely knit pack of literary-minded young blades out for a good time.” When they weren't spending time at the Park Theatre or the Shakespeare Tavern at the corner of Nassau and Fulton Streets in Lower Manhattan, they gathered at an old family mansion on the Passaic River in Woodside which Gouverneur Kemble had inherited and which they called "Cockloft Hall". For a short time they produced Salmagundi, a periodical.

=== Rail stations ===
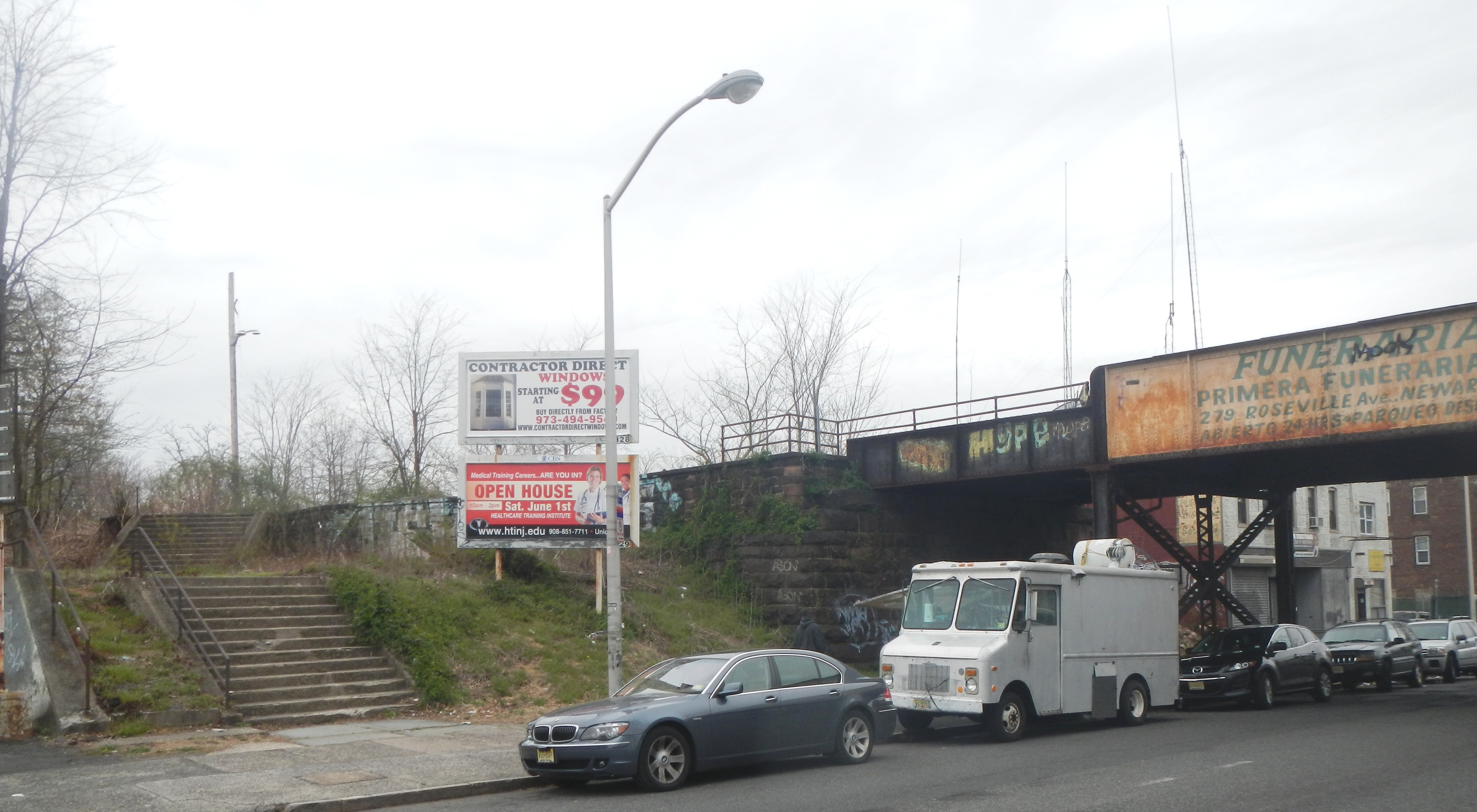
Remnants of the North Newark station

Woodside Station, near the intersection of Grafton Avenue & Oraton Street, was a stop on the Erie-Lackawanna Railroad Newark Branch. There was a small railroad green, snack bar & ticket station next to the tracks. Passenger service was discontinued in 1966, although freight service, operated by Norfolk Southern Railroad as the Newark Industrial Track, remained active for a time and served several local industries.

The North Newark station, with service provided by the Erie Railroad's New York and Greenwood Lake Railway and later by NJ Transit's Boonton Line was located on Broadway. The right of way is a planned state park, the Essex–Hudson Greenway.

=== Housing project ===
The Archbishop Walsh Homes, named for Thomas Joseph Walsh, the first Roman Catholic Archbishop of Newark holding the position from 1937 until his death in 1952, when the project was built. It consisted of nine 8-story buildings. They were demolished beginning in 1997 replaced by "town homes" and a recreation center called the Waterfront.
