= Rowe Street =

Rowe Street may refer to:

- Rowe Street, Sydney, Australia
- Rowe Street (NJT station), an abandoned train station in the town of Bloomfield, New Jersey, United States
- Rowe Street Baptist Church, in Boston, Massachusetts, United States

== See also ==
- Roe Street, Perth, Western Australia
