= Walnut Street station (NJ Transit) =

NJ Transit rail station

Walnut Street
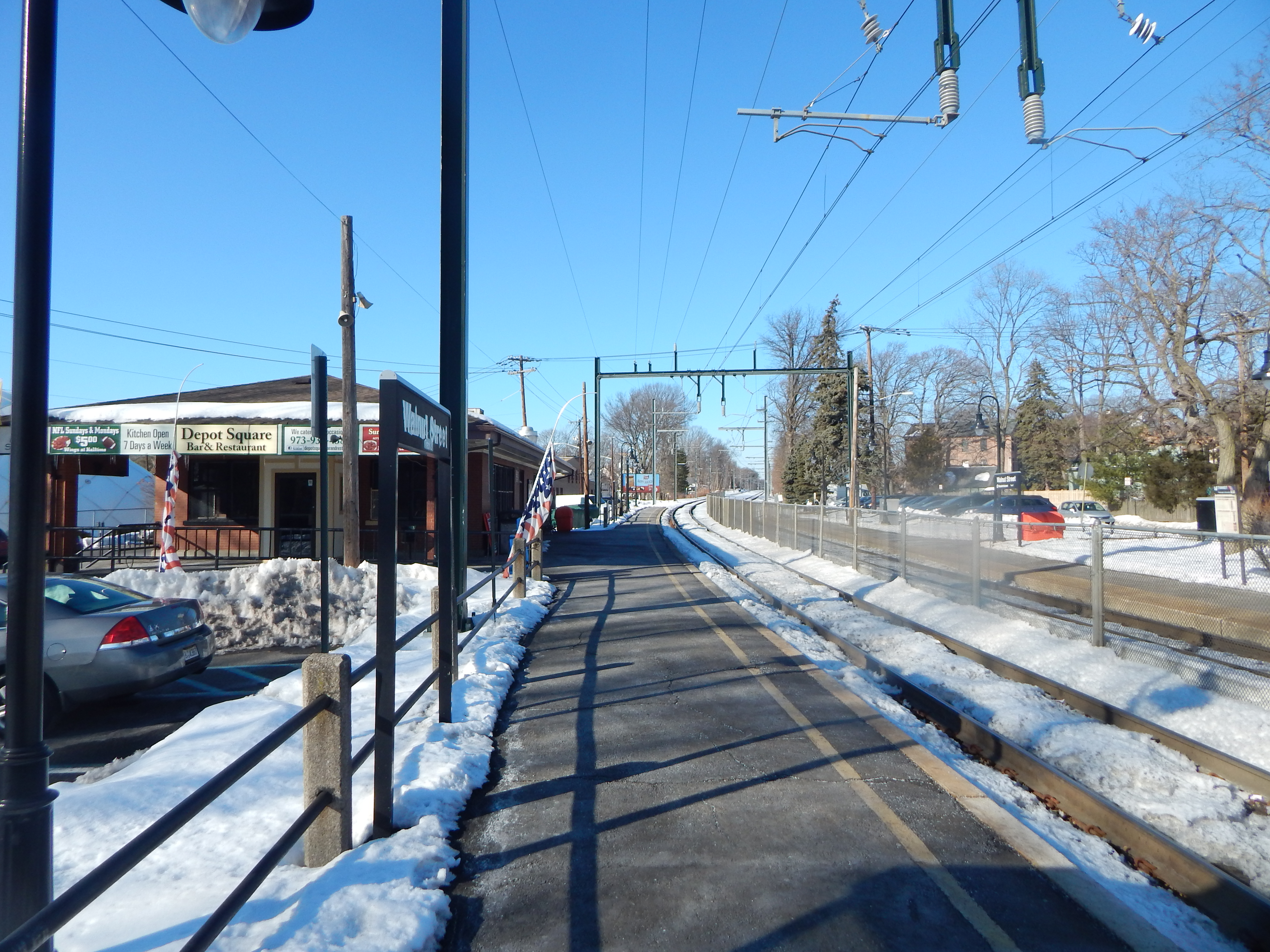
- Walnut Street station in February 2015.

General information
- Location: 25 Depot Square; Montclair, New Jersey 07042
- Coordinates: 40.8173°N 74.2098°W
- Owner: New Jersey Transit
- Platforms: 2 low level side platforms
- Tracks: 2

Construction
- Parking: 198 spots in 4 lots
- Cycle facilities: parking rack
- Accessible: no

Other information
- Station code: 1737
- Fare zone: 5

History
- Opened: January 1, 1873
- Rebuilt: October 27, 1953
- Electrified: September 30, 2002
- Former names: Montclair

Key dates
- July 1, 1981: Station agency closed

Passengers
- 2025: 784 (average weekday)
- Rank: 38 of 153

Services
Preceding station	NJ Transit	Following station
Watchung Avenue toward Hackettstown	Montclair–Boonton Line weekdays	Bay Street toward New York or Hoboken
Former services
Preceding station	NJ Transit	Following station
Watchung Avenue toward Hackettstown	Boonton Line until 2002	Benson Street toward Hoboken
Preceding station	Erie Railroad	Following station
Watchung Avenue toward Sterling Forest	New York and Greenwood Lake Railway	Glen Ridge toward Jersey City
Location

Walnut Street is an active commuter railroad station in the township of Montclair, Essex County, New Jersey. Located on Depot Square (inbound) and Label Street (outbound) north of the namesake Walnut Street, the station serves trains of NJ Transit's Montclair–Boonton Line between New York Penn Station and Hackettstown station in Warren County on weekdays. There is no regular weekend service at Walnut Street station and the four stations to the north in Montclair as a shuttle only operates to Bay Street from Hoboken Terminal. Walnut Street station contains two low-level side platforms. The former Erie Railroad station depot, built in 1953, stands on the inbound platform and serves as a business.

Walnut Street station opened on January 1, 1873 as part of the Montclair Railway from Jersey City to Sterling Forest. Known at the time as Montclair station, it was the first of five stops going outbound on the line. The Erie Railroad demolished the ornate depot that stood there in 1953 at the requests of locals in Montclair. The station agent at the station was eliminated on July 1, 1981 as part of cuts by Conrail and NJ Transit. The station was the first/last on the Boonton Line, which NJ Transit operated from Hoboken Terminal until September 20, 2002. With the opening of the Montclair Connection, the Montclair Branch and Boonton Line were merged into one line, connecting all six stops in Montclair.

== History ==
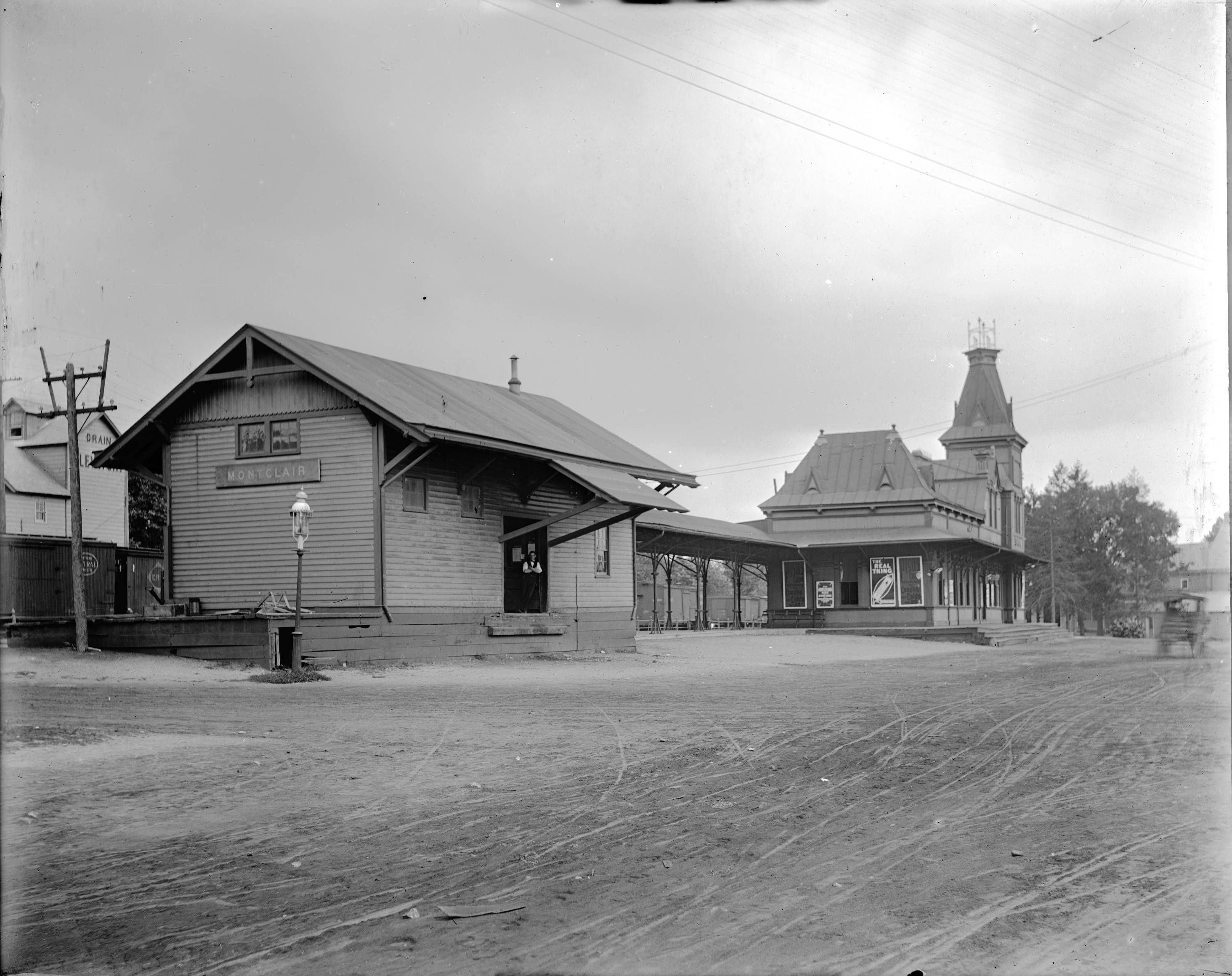
The former Erie Plaza station in Montclair as viewed in 1909. This station was demolished in 1953

Built in 1873 by the Montclair Railway, the station was the Erie Railroad's main station in Montclair. The station was formerly known as Montclair. In 1953, the current building was erected and the old station was demolished. On October 23, 1973, a freight train derailed at the station. The Montclair Connection, which merged the Montclair Branch and the Boonton Line, is a few streets after the station.

== Station layout ==
The station's low-level side platforms are not accessible. The station is located at the corner of Walnut Street and Depot Square, and is in the Walnut street business district.

== Bibliography ==
- Baxter, Raymond J.; Adams, Arthur G. (1999). Railroad Ferries of the Hudson: And Stories of a Deckhand. Fordham, New York: Fordham University Press. ISBN 9780823219544.
- Catlin, George L. (1873). Homes on the Montclair Railway, for New York Business Men. A Description of the Country Adjacent to the Montclair Railway, Between Jersey City and Greenwood Lake. New York, New York: Montclair Railway Company.
- Whittemore, Henry (1894). History of Montclair Township, State of New Jersey: Including the History of Families who Have Been Identified with Its Growth and Prosperity. New York, New York: The Suburban Publishing Company.
