= West Arlington station =

Former railway station in Kearny, New Jersey, US

West Arlington
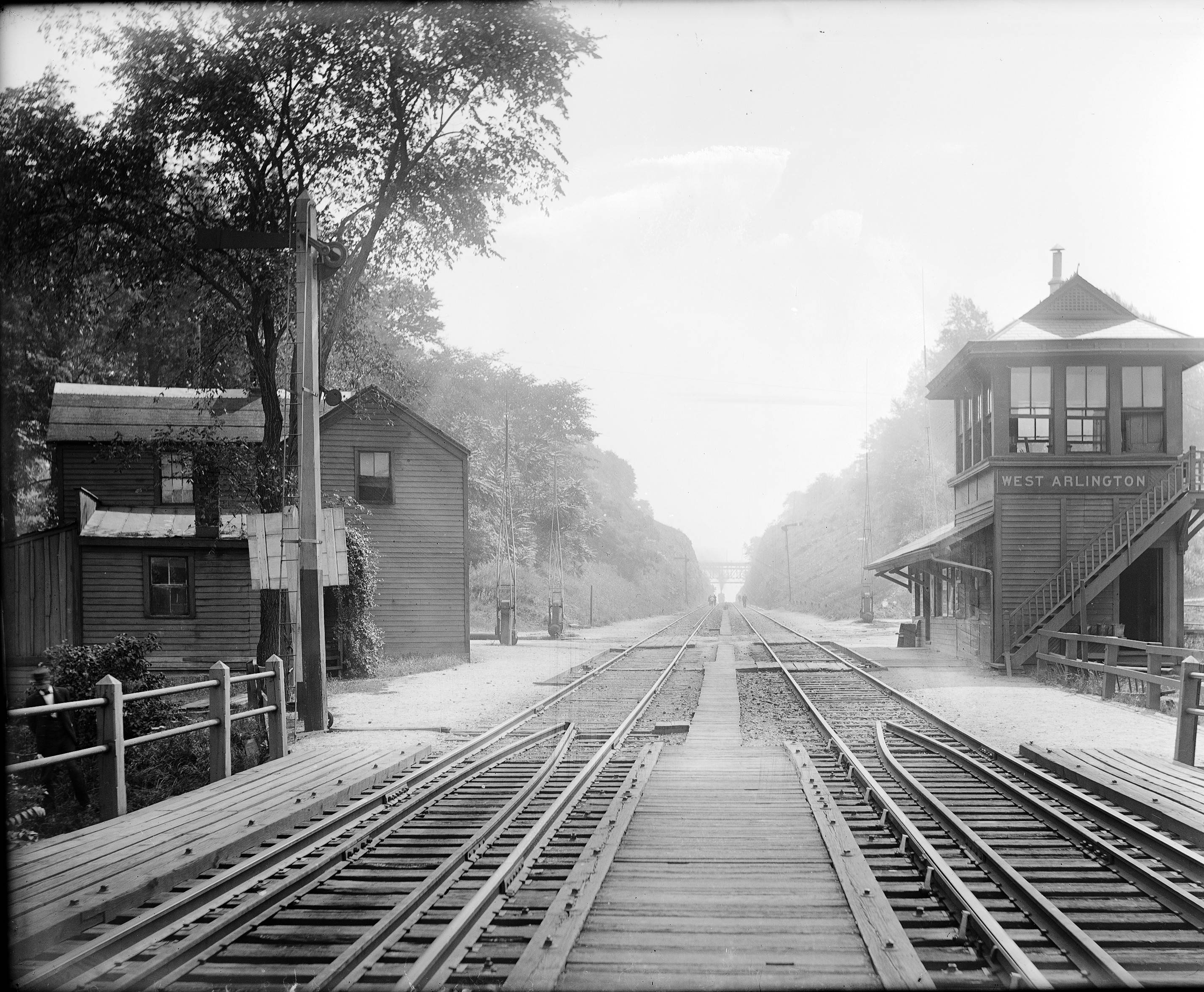
- The former station depot and tower at West Arlington, facing the cut.

General information
- Location: North Midland Avenue; Kearny, New Jersey
- Coordinates: 40.7761°N 74.1493°W
- Owner: Erie Railroad (1873–1960); Erie-Lackawanna Railway (1960–1966)
- Line: New York and Greenwood Lake Railway
- Platforms: 2 side platforms
- Tracks: 2 main line

Construction
- Platform levels: 1

Other information
- Station code: 1703

History
- Opened: January 1, 1873
- Closed: September 30, 1966
- Rebuilt: 1895
- Former names: Kearny (January 1, 1873–)

Former services
Preceding station	Erie Railroad	Following station
North Newark toward Sterling Forest	New York and Greenwood Lake Railway	Arlington toward Jersey City
Location

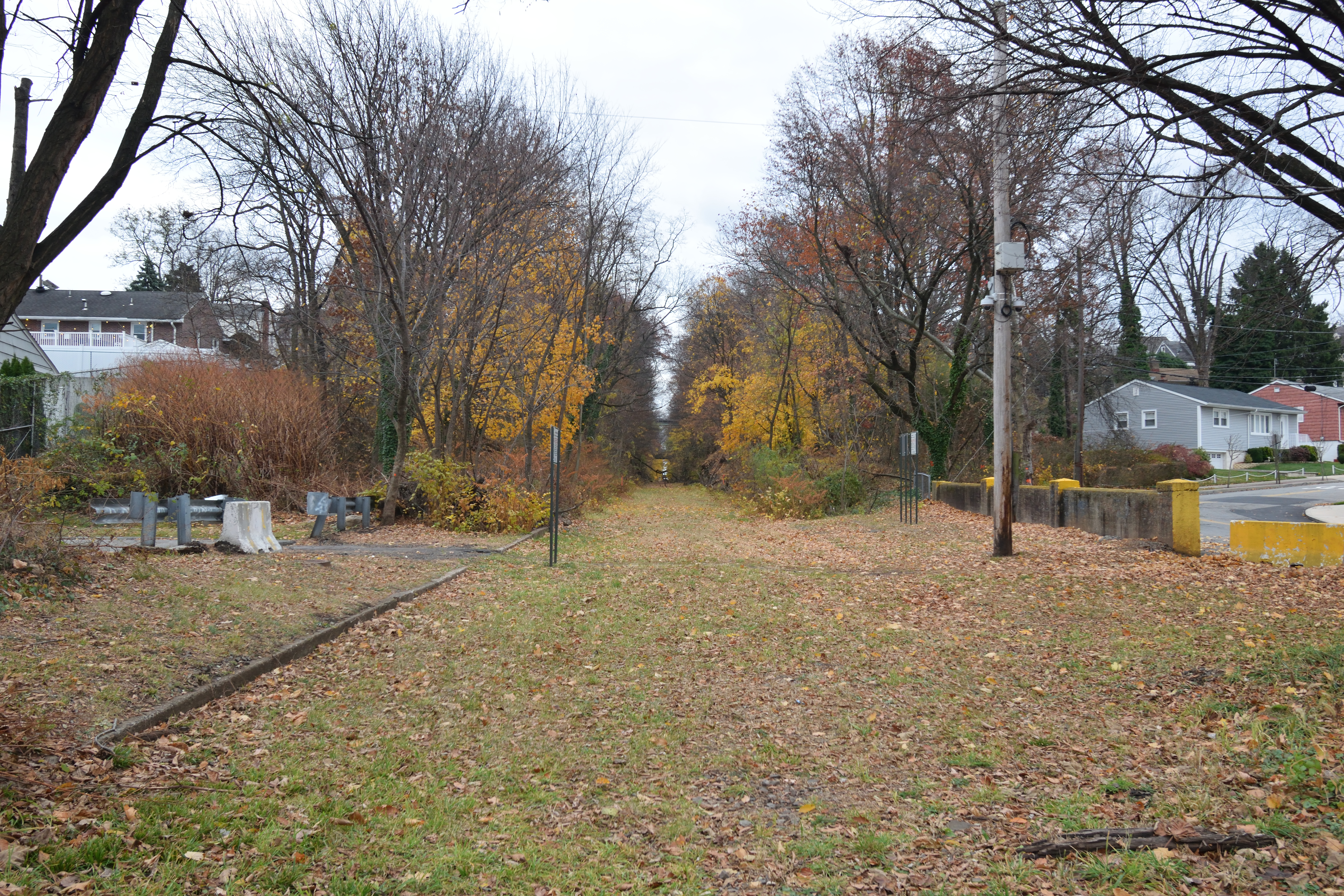
The site of the former West Arlington station in 2024. The building burned down in 1983.

West Arlington was a former commuter railroad train station in the Arlington section of Kearny, Hudson County, New Jersey. Located overlooking Passaic Avenue (Hudson County Route 699), West Arlington station was one of two in Kearny on the Erie Railroad's New York and Greenwood Lake Railroad, the other one being Arlington at Garafola Place. The station contained two low-level side platforms, with a pair of depots, one of which was on each platform. Trains went from Pavonia Terminal in Jersey City to Wanaque–Midvale station in Wanaque. The next station to the west was North Newark, across nearby WR Draw, a swing bridge over the Route 21, the Passaic River and Passaic Avenue.

West Arlington station opened on January 1, 1873 with the opening of the Montclair Railway between Jersey City and Monks in West Milford in Passaic County. At the time of opening, the station retained the name of Kearny. Both the 1888 and 1892 USGS maps identify this as Kearney Station, with the name changing to West Arlington Station on the 1898 map.

The station was located at the end of a cut, 0.5-mile (0.80 km) west of Arlington station. West Arlington station, which doubled as the control tower for nearby WR Draw, served passenger trains until September 30, 1966, when the Erie-Lackawanna Railroad discontinued passenger service to the station after a final Caldwell Branch train crossed. The station depot on the eastbound platform remained, standing abandoned until it burned down in 1983.

== Station layout and services ==
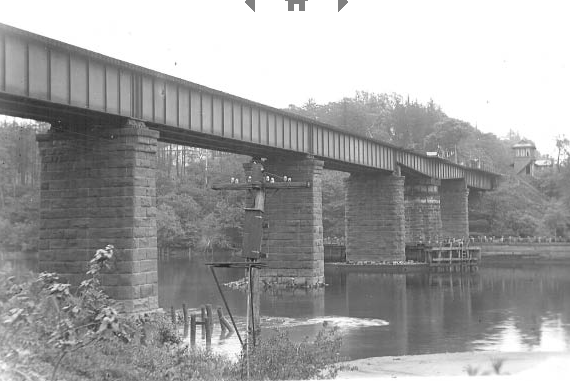
The tower and station at West Arlington as seen from the opposite shore of the Passaic River in Newark

Ground/ Platform level	Side platform
Ground/ Platform level	Outbound	← Greenwood Lake Division weekdays toward Wanaque–Midvale (North Newark)
Ground/ Platform level	Inbound	Greenwood Lake Division weekdays toward Hoboken (Arlington) →
Ground/ Platform level	Side platform, station depot

West Arlington station consisted of two low-level side platforms. the eastbound platform contained a station depot and interlocking tower, accessible from North Midland Avenue and Passaic Avenue. The westbound platform had no shelter at the end of service in 1966, accessible from Passaic Avenue and Laurel Avenue. The western end of the asphalt platforms contained the walkway for WR Draw. The 13-by-31-foot (4.0 m × 9.4 m) interlocking tower built into the eastbound depot contained the mechanics to open the swing bridge over the Passaic River and Route 21. The 1914-installed interlocking system contained 16 levers to operate the bridge and related switches. WR Tower also operated remote control switches at the Forest Hill station in Newark, including the crossover to the Orange Branch, the connection to the eastern main line track from the Orange Branch and a crossover from the Orange Branch to a nearby siding. These services took over the purposes of OJ Tower in Forest Hill, a former 13-by-21-foot (4.0 m × 6.4 m) interlocking tower with 34 levers. The tower also operated the actions of the office in Great Notch for the Caldwell Branch.

When the station opened with the Montclair Railway on January 1, 1873, then-Kearny station operated with 15 trains daily. At the end of service in 1966, West Arlington station serviced only three trains on weekdays. The single eastbound train, which ran to Hoboken Terminal, arrived at 7:53 a.m. on a train from Essex Fells on the Caldwell Branch. West Arlington had two westbound trains from Hoboken, train 1415, which went to Essex Fells, stopping at 5:57 p.m. The other was a train to Wanaque–Midvale, train 1419, which arrived at 6:30 p.m.

== Bibliography ==
- Catlin, George L. (1873). Homes on the Montclair Railway, for New York Business Men. A Description of the Country Adjacent to the Montclair Railway, Between Jersey City and Greenwood Lake. New York, New York: Montclair Railway Company.
- Yanosey, Robert J. (2006). Erie Railroad Facilities (In Color). Vol. 1: New Jersey. Scotch Plains, New Jersey: Morning Sun Books Inc. ISBN 1582481830.
