= DB Draw =

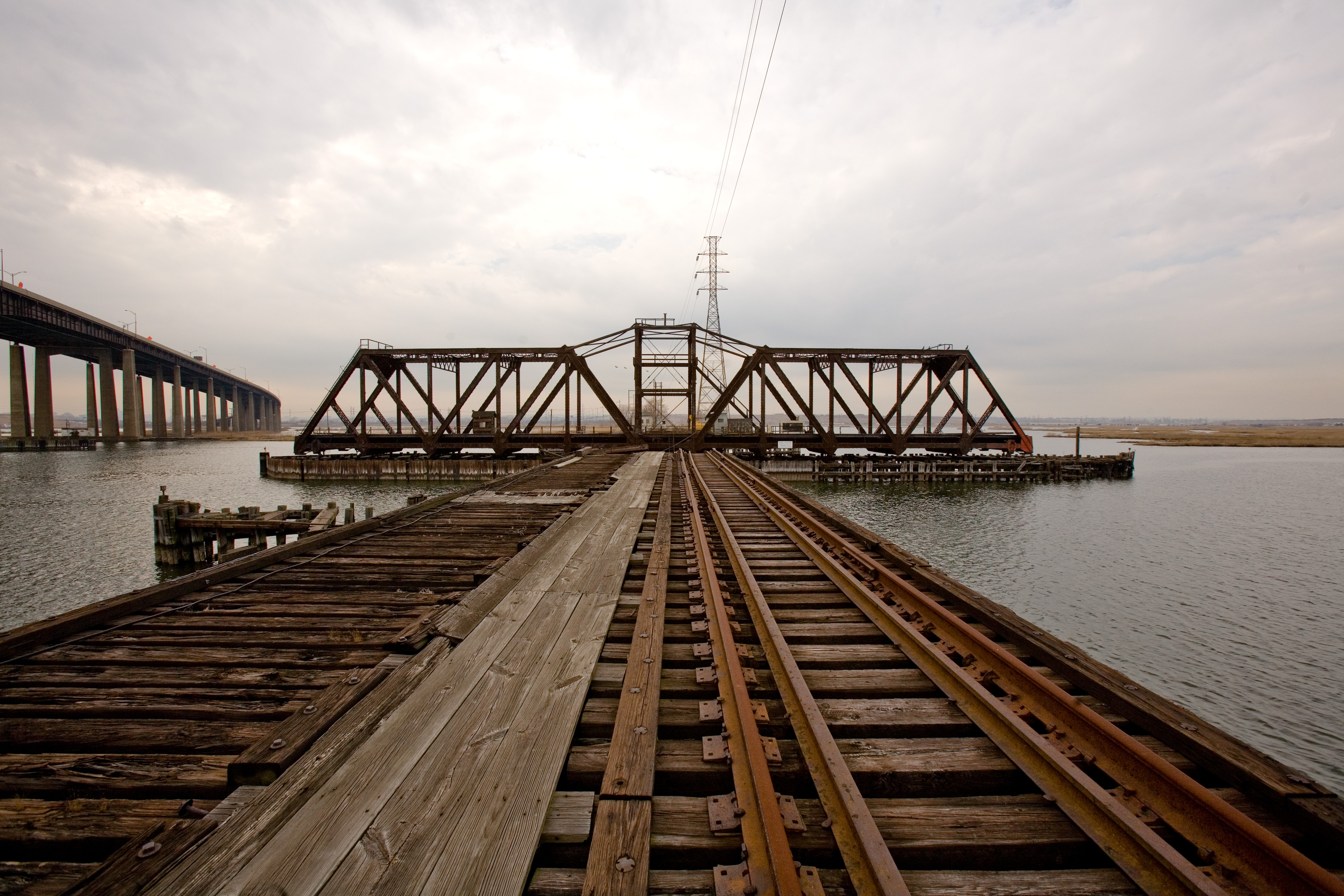
- DB Draw seen from the bank of the Hackensack River in Secaucus
- Coordinates: 40.7583°N 74.0933°W
- Carries: One track of NJ Transit Boonton Line
- Crosses: Hackensack River
- Locale: Secaucus and Kearny
- Maintained by: Norfolk Southern

Characteristics
- Design: Swing bridge

History
- Opened: 1889
- Closed: October 2002

Location
- Interactive map of DB Draw

DB Draw is a derelict railroad swing bridge crossing the Hackensack River between Secaucus and Kearny, in New Jersey, United States. It was built in 1889 by the New York, Lake Erie and Western Railroad, (reorganized in 1895 as the Erie Railroad) and was used by the New York and Greenwood Lake and the Newark Branch.

The bridge later carried New Jersey Transit's Boonton Line until the line was connected to the Montclair Branch via the Montclair Connection, to form the Montclair-Boonton Line. The bridge then reverted to Norfolk Southern Railway control, which has since placed it out of service. It was decommissioned in October 2002 and left in an open position for river traffic.

As of 2022, the line is being converted to a rail trail.

== See also ==
- List of crossings of the Hackensack River
