= Arlington station (NJ Transit) =

Train station in New Jersey, US, 1873–2002

Arlington

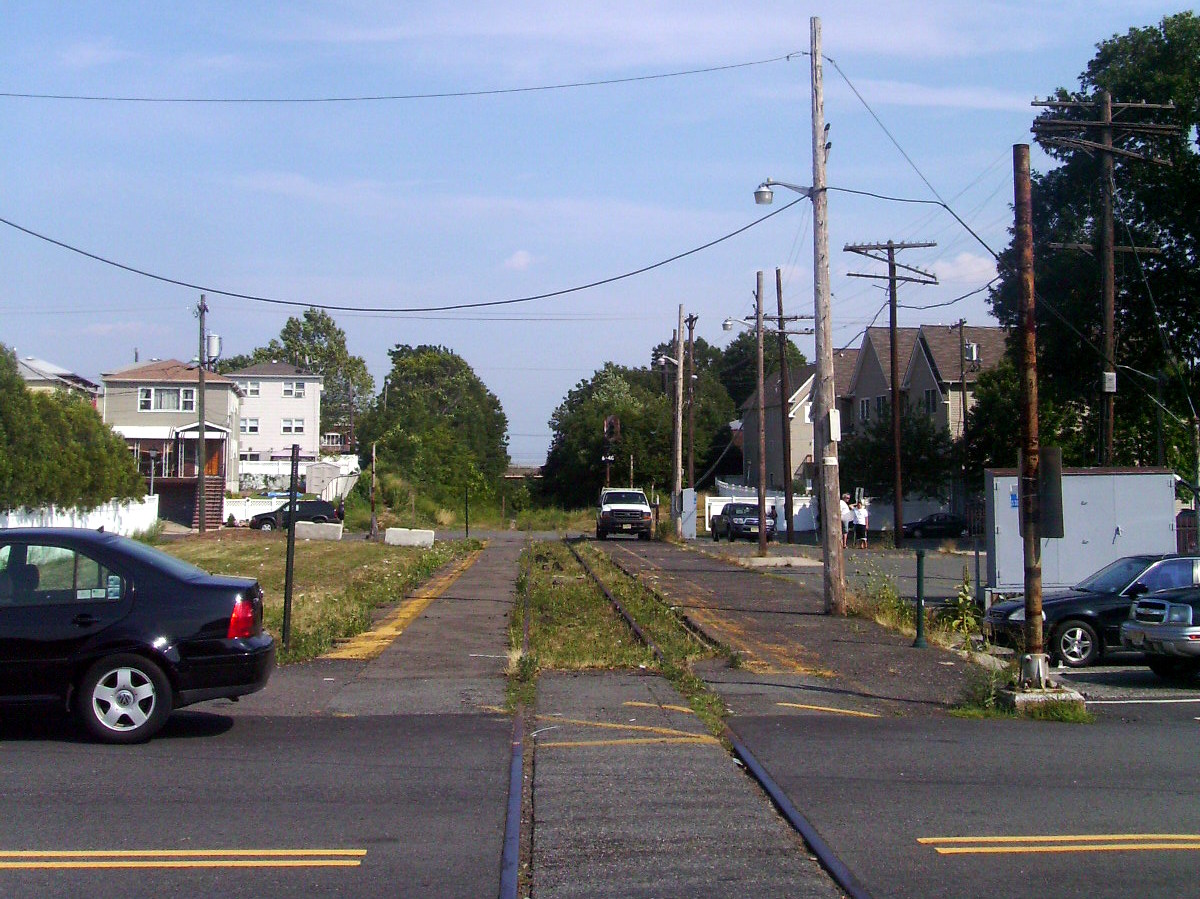
- The site of the former Arlington station as viewed near Garafola Place.

General information
- Location: Garafola Place between Elm and Forest Streets, Kearny, New Jersey
- Coordinates: 40.7698°N 74.1401°W
- Owner: Norfolk Southern
- Line: Boonton Line
- Platforms: 2 low-level side platforms
- Tracks: 2

Construction
- Platform levels: 1

Other information
- Station code: 1701 (Erie Railroad)

History
- Opened: January 1, 1873; 153 years ago
- Closed: September 20, 2002; 23 years ago
- Electrified: N/A
- Former names: Conrail, New Jersey Transit

Passengers
- 2002: 137

Former services
Preceding station	NJ Transit	Following station
Rowe Street toward Hackettstown	Boonton Line	Hoboken Terminus
North Newark toward Hackettstown	Boonton Line until April 26, 1986	Hoboken Terminus
Preceding station	Erie Railroad	Following station
West Arlington toward Sterling Forest	New York and Greenwood Lake Railway	Jersey City Terminus
Location

Arlington is a former commuter railroad train station in the Arlington section of Kearny, Hudson County, New Jersey. Located on Garafola Place between the Forest and Elm Street intersections, the station served trains on NJ Transit's Boonton Line as well as the only remaining active station in Kearny until its closure. The station, which contained two low-level side platforms, operated trains between Hoboken Terminal and locations west to Dover and Hackettstown. The next station to the east was Hoboken while the station to the west was Rowe Street in Bloomfield.

Railroad service through the Arlington neighborhood began on January 1, 1873 with the introduction of the Montclair Railway between Pavonia Terminal in Jersey City to Monks in West Milford. The station was one of two in Kearny for the line, with the other one at West Arlington. This line became and the New York and Greenwood Lake Railroad, operated by the Erie Railroad until October 17, 1960. The line became part of the merged Greenwood Lake-Boonton Line in 1963. The service continued into NJ Transit, becoming the Boonton Line. Arlington station closed, along with Rowe Street and Benson Street station in Glen Ridge on September 20, 2002 in advance of the opening of the Montclair Connection.

== Accident ==
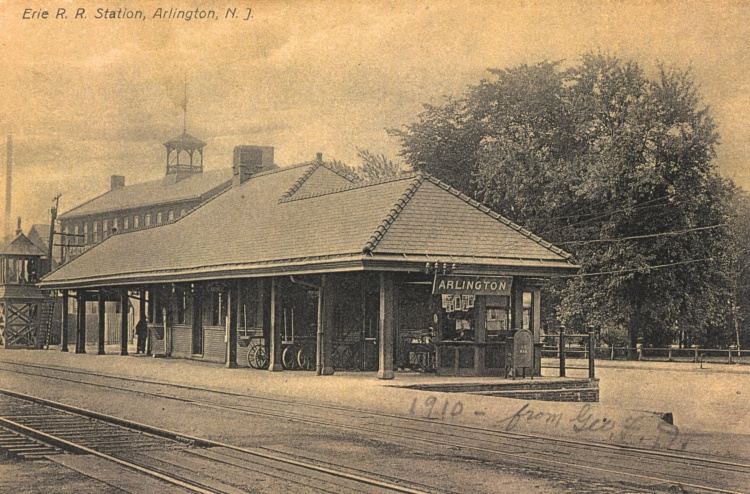
Arlington station in 1910 during its days as an Erie Railroad station

On September 8, 1965, three Kearny High School students were struck and killed by a two car Erie Lackawanna train. The trio, on their way to the first day of the fall term, crossed the tracks at the Elm Street crossing next to the station despite the gate being down. Thinking the warning lights were for a departing east bound train (towards Hoboken), the three students went around the barrier. A boxcar parked in a siding next to the station blocked the victims from seeing the oncoming west bound express train.

All three (Robert Floyd, 16, Rodney Murdock, 16, and Richard Collins, 15) were killed instantly. Both the train's fireman and conductor were later arraigned on charges of manslaughter. Following the accident, the town of Kearny began to have physical guards at the crossing during school hours.

== See also ==
- Benson Street – First of two additional stations that were removed with the Montclair Connection.
- Rowe Street – Second of two additional stations that were removed with the Montclair Connection.
- West Arlington station – Second of two stations in Arlington for the Erie Lackawanna Railway.

== Bibliography ==
- Catlin, George L. (1873). Homes on the Montclair Railway, for New York Business Men. A Description of the Country Adjacent to the Montclair Railway, Between Jersey City and Greenwood Lake. New York, New York: Montclair Railway Company.
