= Benson Street station =

Railway station in Glen Ridge, New Jersey, United States

Coordinates: 40.8044797°N 74.199318°W

Benson Street

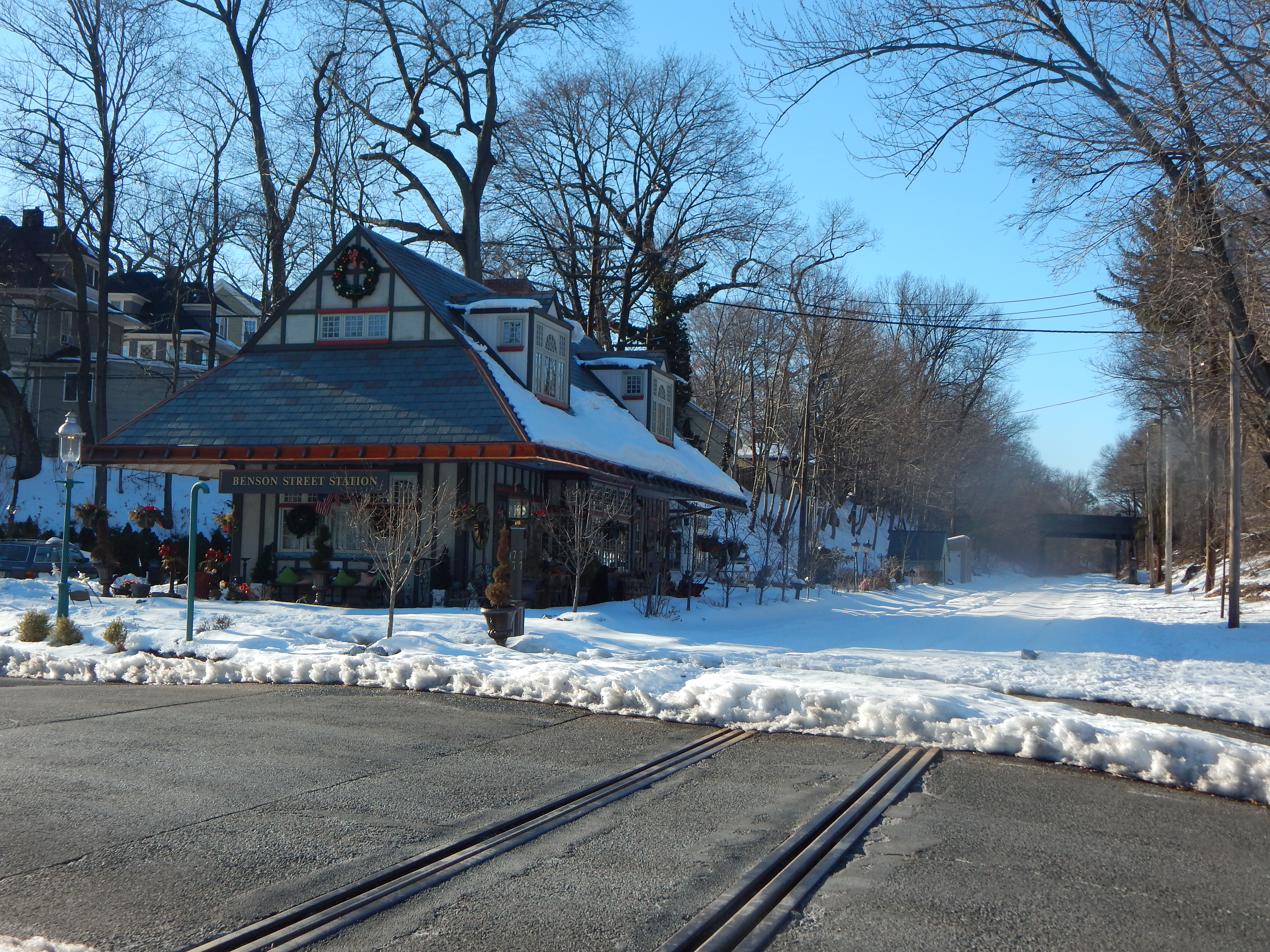
- The Benson Street station in February 2015.

General information
- Location: 77 Benson Street, Glen Ridge, New Jersey 07028
- Owner: Norfolk Southern (formerly Erie Railroad, Conrail, New Jersey Transit)
- Line: Boonton Line
- Platforms: 2 ground-level
- Tracks: 2

Construction
- Platform levels: 1

Other information
- Station code: 1735 (Erie Railroad)

History
- Opened: January 1, 1873
- Closed: September 20, 2002; 23 years ago
- Rebuilt: 1883
- Electrified: Not electrified
- Former names: Glen Ridge, Chestnut Hill

Former services
Preceding station	NJ Transit	Following station
Walnut Street toward Hackettstown	Boonton Line	Rowe Street toward Hoboken
Preceding station	Erie Railroad	Following station
Montclair toward Sterling Forest	New York and Greenwood Lake Railway	Bloomfield toward Jersey City
Location

Benson Street is a former train station located in a residential section of the borough of Glen Ridge, New Jersey.

== History ==
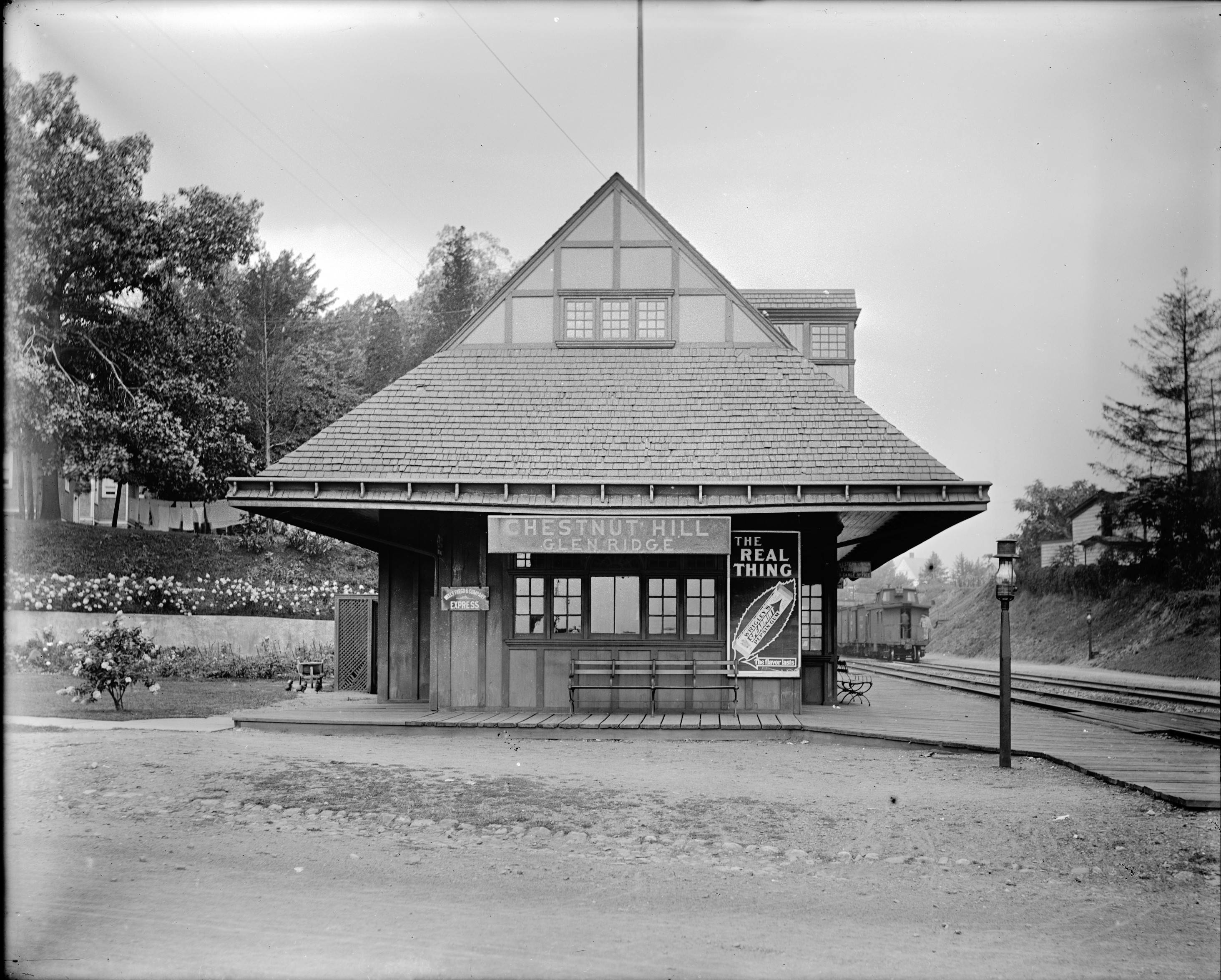
The station when it was known as Chestnut Hill

The station was constructed in 1883 in a unique English Tudor design with stucco facades and a slate roof as part of the New York and Greenwood Lake Railway, an Erie Railroad operation, and was known as Glenwood. It had a two platform, two track station with the gas lights on the side of tracks. It later became a stop on New Jersey Transit Rail Operations Boonton Line, which runs from Hoboken Terminal to Hackettstown, and renamed Benson Street. Service was discontinued to Benson Street (along with Rowe Street in Bloomfield and Arlington in Kearny) on September 20, 2002 when the Montclair Connection was opened. Glen Ridge is serviced to the south at Glen Ridge station in the downtown commercial district.

In May 2009, the Benson Street station was sold to private owners by New Jersey Transit to rehabilitate the aging structure, and the new owners began stabilizing the structure which had been damaged by a fire in the 1980s and was in serious disrepair. The building is part of the Glen Ridge Historic District. On December 2, 2009, after a review from the New Jersey State Historical Preservation Organization, the new owners received approval to begin preliminary reconstruction of the former Benson Street Station. This rehabilitation project started by restructuring the basement of the building. By June 2010, the station had received new gutters, new walls and brand new roofing. Parts of the building's first floor paneling was kept, although the second story requires brand new paneling as it is converted into a new single family home. The restoration of the building was completed around May 2012. As of 2013 it is now a single family home, although one platform in the building is still present today.

== See also ==
- Operating Passenger Railroad Stations Thematic Resource (New Jersey)
- National Register of Historic Places listings in Essex County, New Jersey

== Bibliography ==
- Baxter, Raymond J.; Adams, Arthur G. (1999). Railroad Ferries of the Hudson: And Stories of a Deckhand. Fordham, New York: Fordham University Press. ISBN 9780823219544.
- Catlin, George L. (1873). Homes on the Montclair Railway, for New York Business Men. A Description of the Country Adjacent to the Montclair Railway, Between Jersey City and Greenwood Lake. New York, New York: Montclair Railway Company.
- Whittemore, Henry (1894). History of Montclair Township, State of New Jersey: Including the History of Families who Have Been Identified with Its Growth and Prosperity. New York, New York: The Suburban Publishing Company.
