= Sterling Forest, New York =

- Hamlet
- Location within New York
- Coordinates: 41°10′N 74°19′W
- Country: United States
- State: New York
- County: Orange
- Time zone: UTC-5 (EST)
  - Summer (DST): UTC-4 (EDT)
- ZIP Code: 10979
- Area code: 845

Sterling Forest, New York is a hamlet in the Town of Warwick, Orange County. It is served by an active United States post office of the same name. It is situated on the eastern shore of Greenwood Lake, at the New Jersey state line. Part of the hamlet extends into West Milford Township, Passaic County, New Jersey. The hamlet grew up around the terminal station of the Montclair and Greenwood Lake Railway, later called the New York and Greenwood Lake Railway, and later the Greenwood Lake division of the Erie Railroad. The railroad reached this point around 1875, with the station located at the state line in New Jersey. The depot complex originally contained the Sterling Forest, New Jersey post office. The post office was moved to the New York side of the line in 1926, where it continues to operate. Rail service ceased in 1935.

The coming of the railroad was preceded by the construction of a large commercial ice house by the Ringwood Company around 1864. The Sterling Forest ice house was later operated by the Mountain Ice Company of Hoboken, New Jersey. It ceased operation and was eventually torn down in 1945.

At one time, the hamlet also boasted two hotels (one in New Jersey), a general store, lumber yard, two bars (in addition to those in the hotels) and a Roman Catholic church (in New Jersey). Today, the only businesses that remain are one bar/restaurant, and a marina (on the site of the depot).

In the 1930s and 1940s, Yankee great Babe Ruth often rented a cabin in the hamlet for the summer, and was known to play baseball with the local neighborhood children at a small ballfield located there.

It was the site of the first American rocket airplane flight that carried mail from the New York side of the state line to the New Jersey side on February 23, 1936.

Often confused with Sterling Forest, New York is the old Sterling Forest Gardens property and the adjacent Sterling Forest State Park, both located several miles away in the Town of Tuxedo, New York. The property is now the site of the New York Renaissance Faire, an annual Renaissance fair. Adding to the confusion, there is another fair called The Sterling Renaissance Festival which is located north of Syracuse, NY.
