= New York and Greenwood Lake Railway (1878–1943) =

U.S. railroad

New York & Greenwood Lake Railway
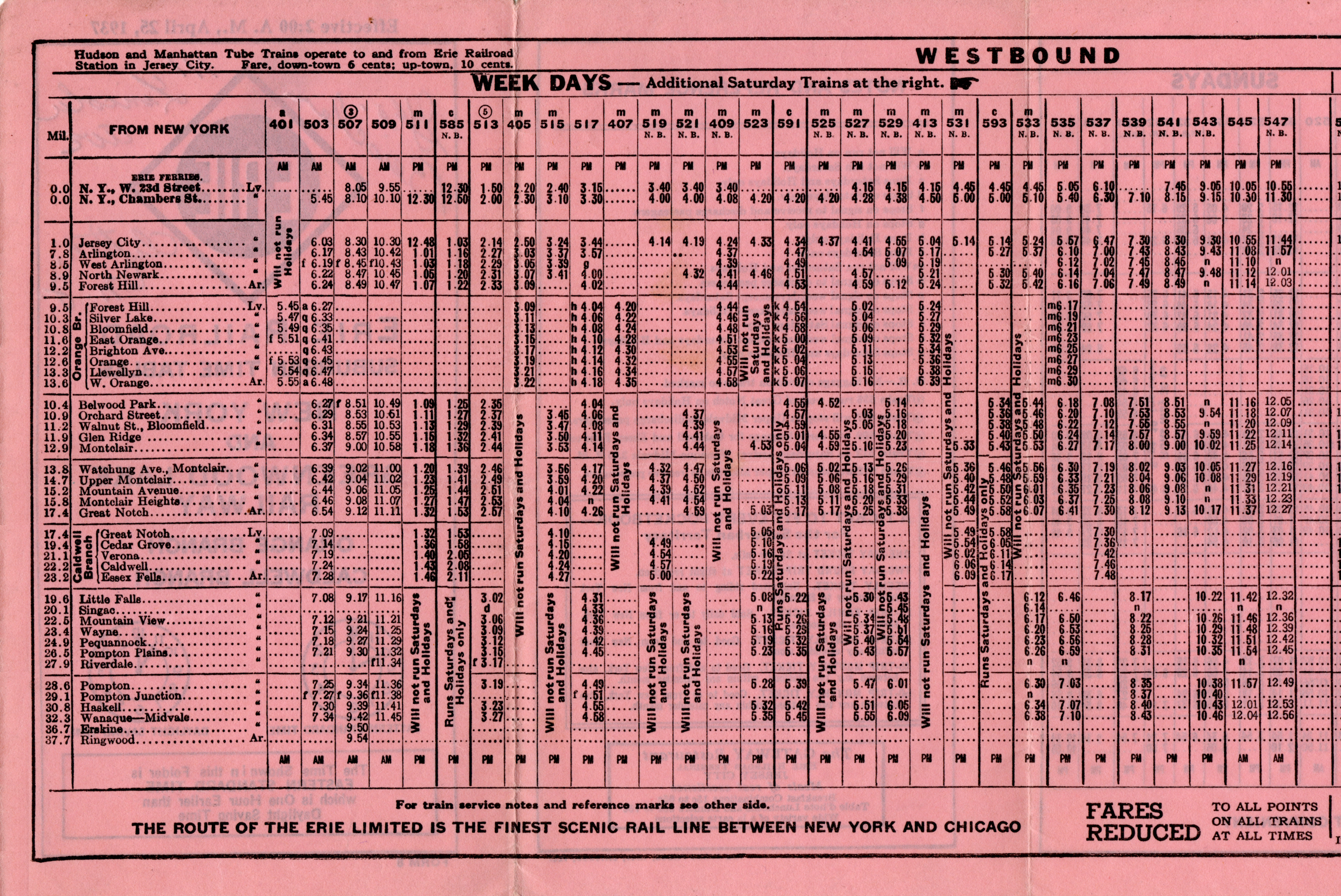
- Former Greenwood Lake timetable from 1937, produced by the Erie Railroad.

Overview
- Locale: Sterling Forest, Passaic County–Jersey City, Hudson County, New Jersey
- Dates of operation: January 1, 1873 (as Montclair Railway)–July 1943 (absorbed officially into Erie Railroad)

Technical
- Track gauge: 4 ft 8 1/2 in (1,435 mm) standard gauge

The New York and Greenwood Lake Railway owned a line between Croxton, Jersey City, New Jersey and Greenwood Lake, New York. Service on the line was provided by the Erie Railroad.

The Montclair Railway was established in 1867. It was founded by Julius Pratt, who had renamed Montclair, New Jersey, for what was then West Bloomfield. By the mid-1870s it ran between Croxton and Sterling Forest at the New York state line, but the financially unstable railroad went into receivership, and in 1875 became the Montclair and Greenwood Lake Railway In 1878 the company was re-organized as the New York and Greenwood Lake Railway (NYGL), under control of the Erie.

In 1887, the Erie created a new subsidiary, the Arlington Railroad, to create a new, more direct ROW in the Kearny Meadows between the Hackensack River and Passaic River. In the mid-1890s, the Erie greatly expanded the infrastructure and service on the Greenwood Lake, taking over the Watchung Railway (in 1895), the Caldwell Railway (in 1897) and the Roseland Railway (also in 1897), the former becoming the Orange Branch and the latter two the Caldwell Branch (see Great Notch (NJT station)). In 1897, the Erie opened the DB Draw over the Hackensack and the WR Draw over the Passaic providing the company a modernized ROW from its Pavonia Terminal through the Long Dock Tunnel and across the Meadows.

The property was acquired directly in 1943 by the Erie Railroad, which merged with the Delaware, Lackawanna and Western Railroad in 1960, to create the Erie-Lackawanna Railroad. Passenger service on the line north of Mountain View, to Greenwood Lake, was abandoned in stages.

Conrail operated commuter rail on the line from 1976 to 1982, when New Jersey Transit Rail Operations took over. The line south and east of Mountain View and north and west of Montclair is operated as part of the Montclair-Boonton Line and runs now to Hoboken, with Midtown Direct service into New York Penn Station. Three passenger stations (Arlington, Rowe Street and Benson Street) were abandoned when the Montclair Connection opened in 2002 and the Hackensack River bridge was placed out of service.

Conrail continued to operate freight service on the line until 1999, when the Norfolk Southern Railway took over. Norfolk Southern operated on the Orange Branch until 2010 when the last remaining shipper Hartz Mountain closed their Bloomfield plant.

A short segment of the Orange Branch was brought back into use for passengers as part of the Newark Light Rail, with stations at Silver Lake and Grove Street.

In 2020, Norfolk Southern (NS) officially abandoned the eastern 8.63-mile (13.89 km) section (milepost WD 2.9 to milepost WD 11.5) of the rail line. The New Jersey Department of Environmental Protection, which manages state parks and forests, acquired the property on August 19, 2022. The state purchased the ROW from NS for $65 million with the intention to create the Essex–Hudson Greenway.

== Gallery ==
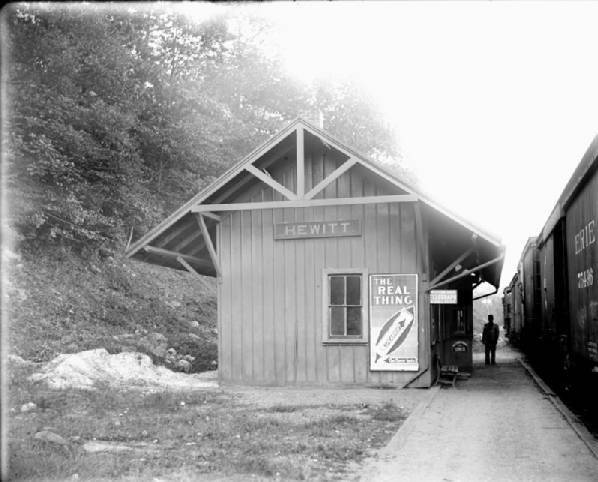
Hewitt station in 1909

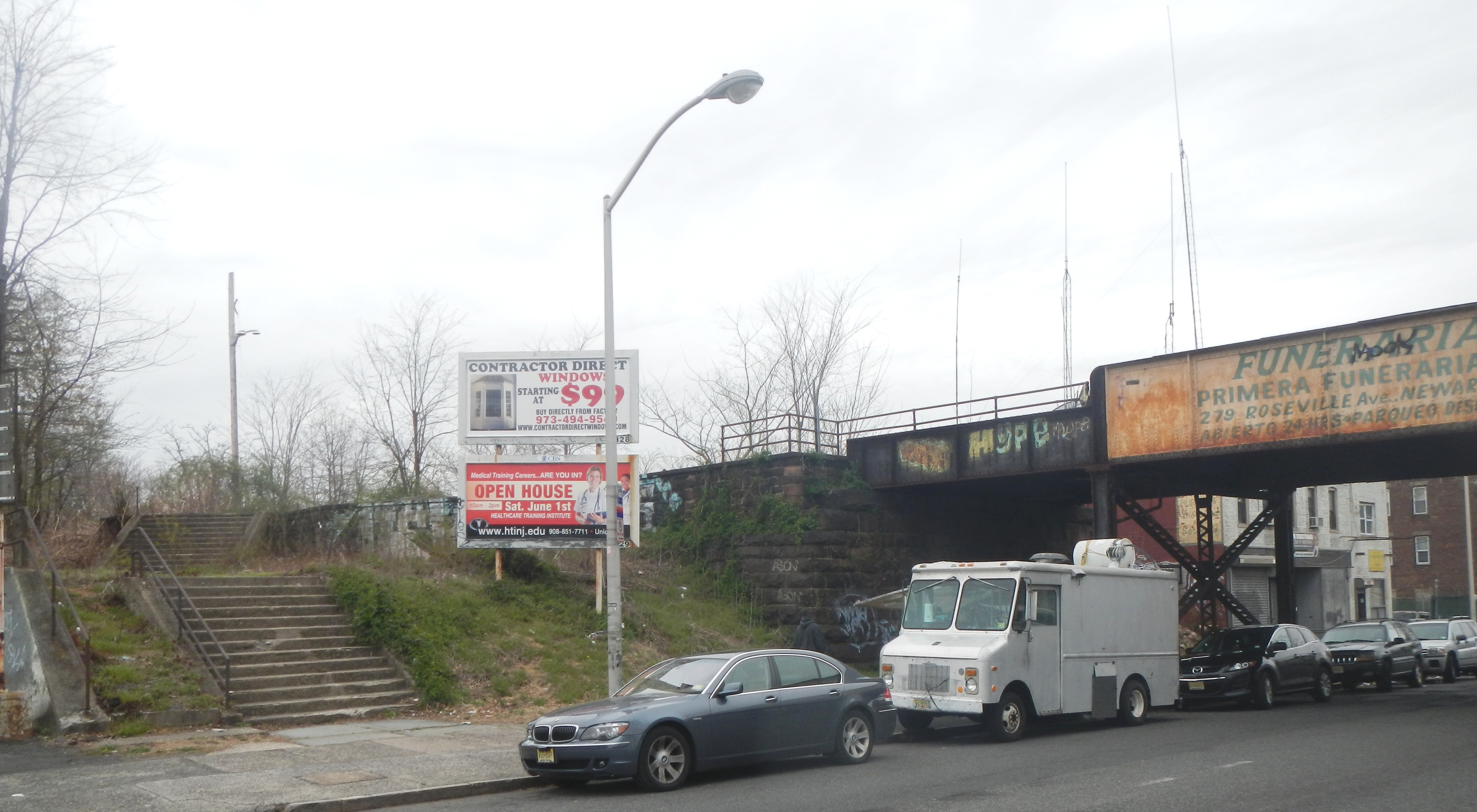
North Newark station site, 2013

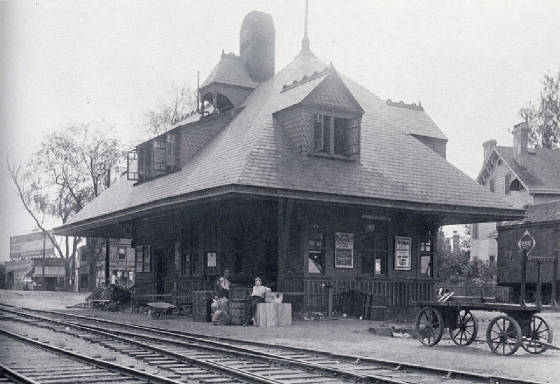
West Orange station in 1909

System map

== Bibliography ==
- Interstate Commerce Commission (1944). Decisions of the Interstate Commerce Commission of the United States (Finance Reports) July 1942–April 1944 (Report). Washington D.C.: United States Government Printing Office.
