= Rowe Street station =

Abandoned train station in Bloomfield, USA

Coordinates: 40.7958°N 74.1836°W

Rowe Street

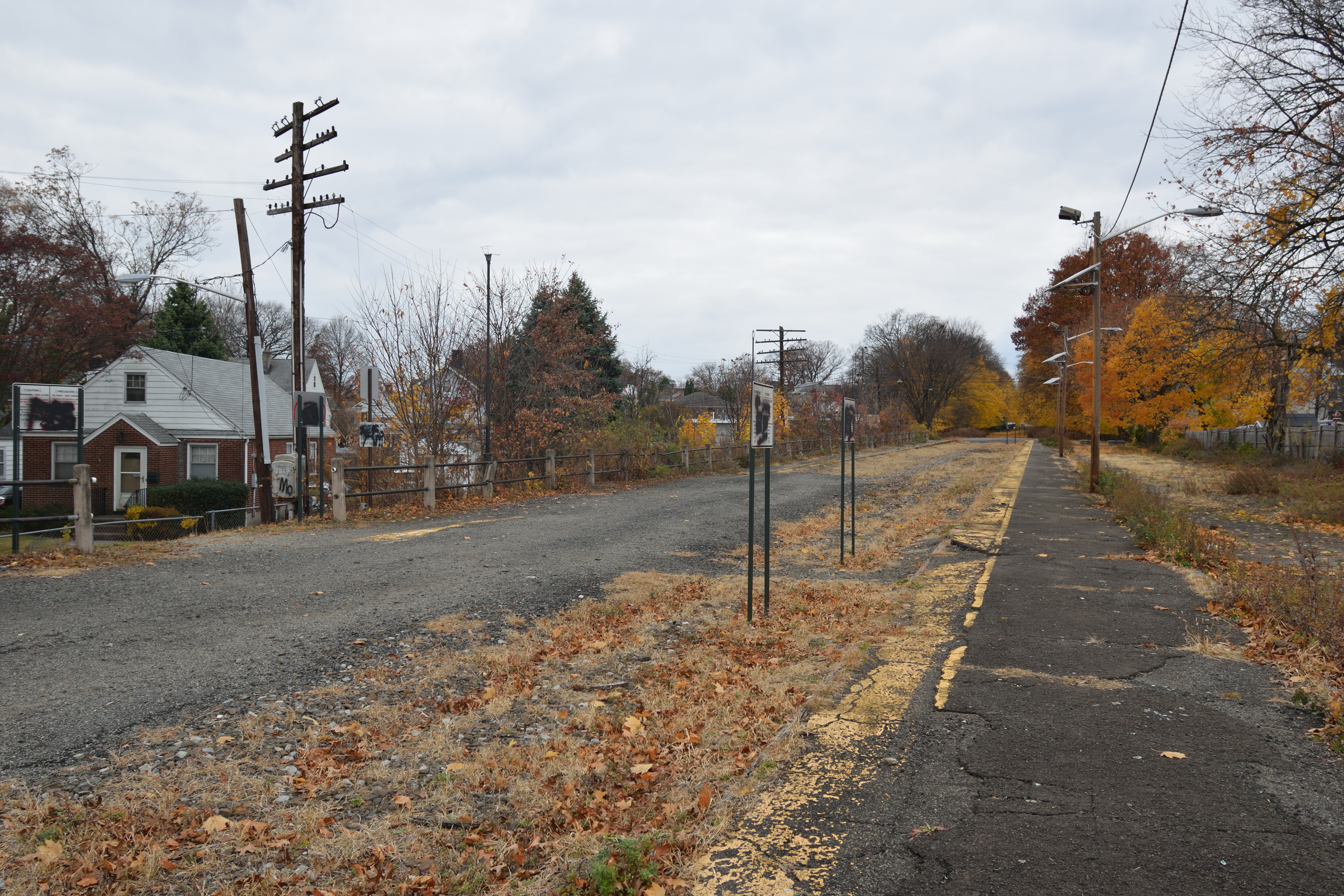
- The abandoned Rowe Street station in 2024, only the platforms are left.

General information
- Location: Rowe Street at dead-end in Bloomfield, New Jersey
- Owner: Norfolk Southern
- Line: Boonton Line
- Platforms: 2 ground-level
- Tracks: 2

Construction
- Platform levels: 1

History
- Opened: 1955
- Closed: September 20, 2002; 23 years ago

Former services
Preceding station	NJ Transit	Following station
Benson Street toward Hackettstown	Boonton Line	Arlington toward Hoboken
Benson Street toward Hackettstown	Boonton Line until April 26, 1986	North Newark toward Hoboken
Preceding station	Erie Railroad	Following station
Bloomfield toward Sterling Forest	New York and Greenwood Lake Railway	Belwood Park toward Jersey City
Location

Rowe Street is an abandoned train station in the town of Bloomfield, New Jersey. The station was a former stop on the Boonton Line, which ran from Hoboken Terminal to Hackettstown, reaching Rowe Street in Bloomfield. The station was constructed by the Erie Railroad in 1955 as a replacement for the Orchard Street station and the former Bloomfield station (at Walnut Street), which was eliminated for construction of the Garden State Parkway. Construction of the new depot began on April 1, 1955 of a 17 by 45 feet (5.2 m × 13.7 m) single-story brick building. The construction of the depot and the 26-space parking lot cost $23,000 (1955 USD).

Service to Rowe Street lasted for 47 years, until the construction of the Montclair Connection was completed by New Jersey Transit, who had taken over service in 1983. Rowe Street, along with nearby Benson Street (in Glen Ridge) and Arlington (in Kearny), were closed on October 20, 2002 for the new Montclair-Boonton Line.

== History ==
=== Orchard Street station ===
The establishment of a new depot at Orchard Street along the New York and Greenwood Lake Railway began in 1891. The city committee for constructing a new station announced that plans were out in September 1891 for a new station. They also announced the Erie Railroad, the company which owned the line, would accept a new station when constructed. They would also staff it with an agent. On March 23, 1892, a benefit fundraiser occurred for funding the new depot. Tickets would be 25 cents (1892 USD) to attend as they would collect donations and gifts for the cause. By doing this, they would offer the gifts off to raffle to attendees. The plot for the new station was to cost $4,000, located at the intersection of Orchard, Smith and Baylis Streets. The fundraiser raised $127.

In the August 13, 1892 edition of The Bloomfield Citizen newspaper, the station was completed by that date. The Erie promised a new station agent would have been stationed on August 1. However, by August 13, the station was closed still with no agent. On September 1, 1892, the Erie appointed William H. Flood as ticket agent for the Orchard Street station. The railroad superintendent, Moodey, announced that tickets would be available starting the week after.

The new station proved to be a boon for the community, and considered convenient by local commuters. Development was quick in the area around the new station.

=== Closure ===
On September 20, 2002, the Montclair Connection opened, and the three Boonton Line stations closed. Today both platforms survive, as well as a set of stairs leading to Rowe street.
