= Montclair Connection =

Coordinates: 40.8102°N 74.2073°W

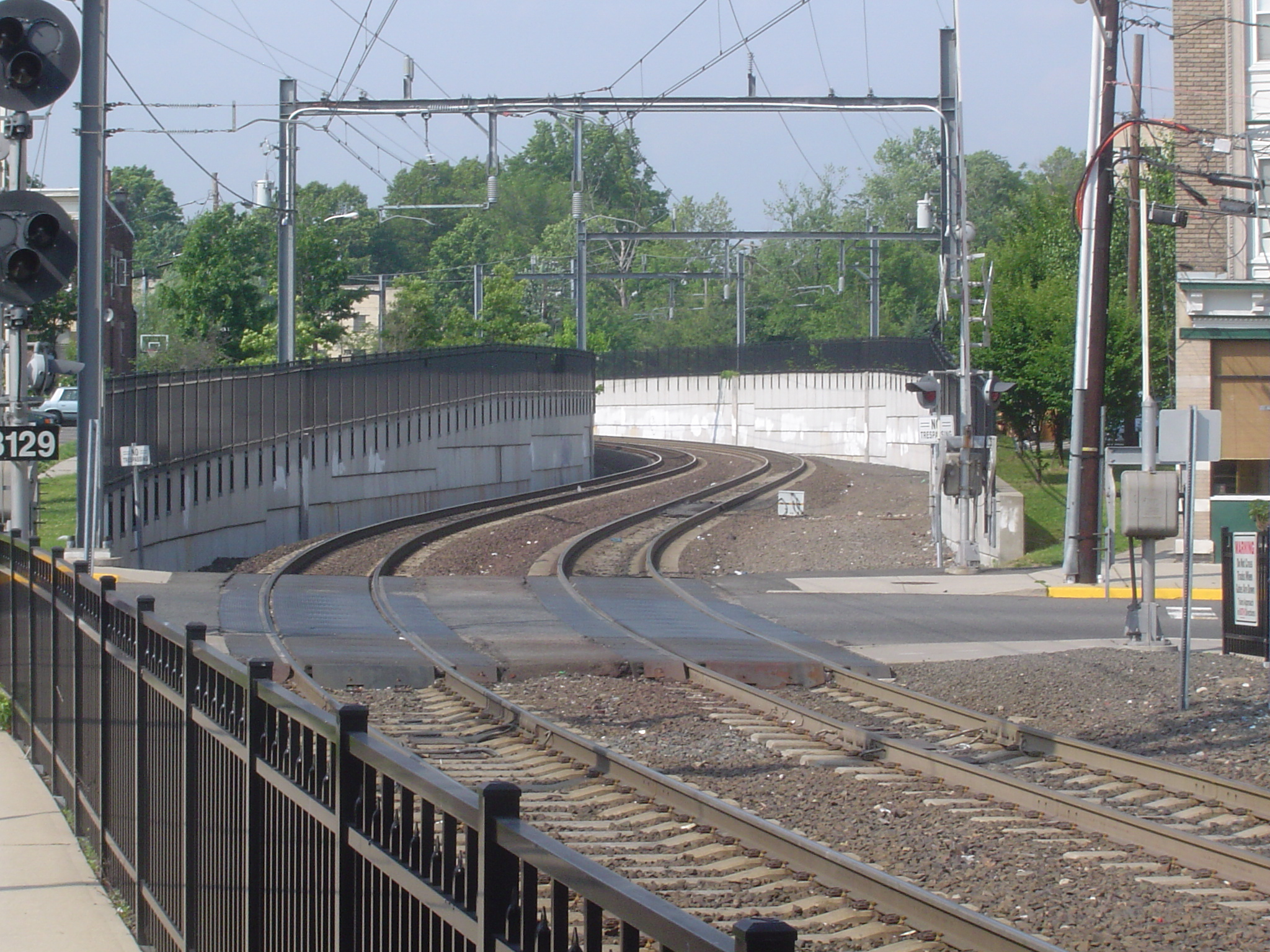
The new track built, viewed from Bay Street Station.

The Montclair Connection is a short section of double-track railroad on the NJ Transit Rail Operations system in New Jersey, United States, connecting the former end of the Montclair Branch at Bay Street station to the old Boonton Line southeast of Walnut Street station.

The connection opened on Monday, September 30, 2002, at a cost of $63 million. At the same time, Bay Street Station was rebuilt and Montclair State University station was built. The Montclair and Boonton lines were combined into the Montclair-Boonton Line, and passenger service was ended on the former Boonton Line east of the connection; the line was single-tracked and used by Norfolk Southern Railway for freight for a time; it is currently out of service. Disuse has caused sections of the line to become derelict, in particular east of the Passaic River where DB and WR drawbridges have been condemned. As part of the project, three Boonton Line stations were closed on September 20, 2002; Benson Street, Rowe Street, and Arlington.

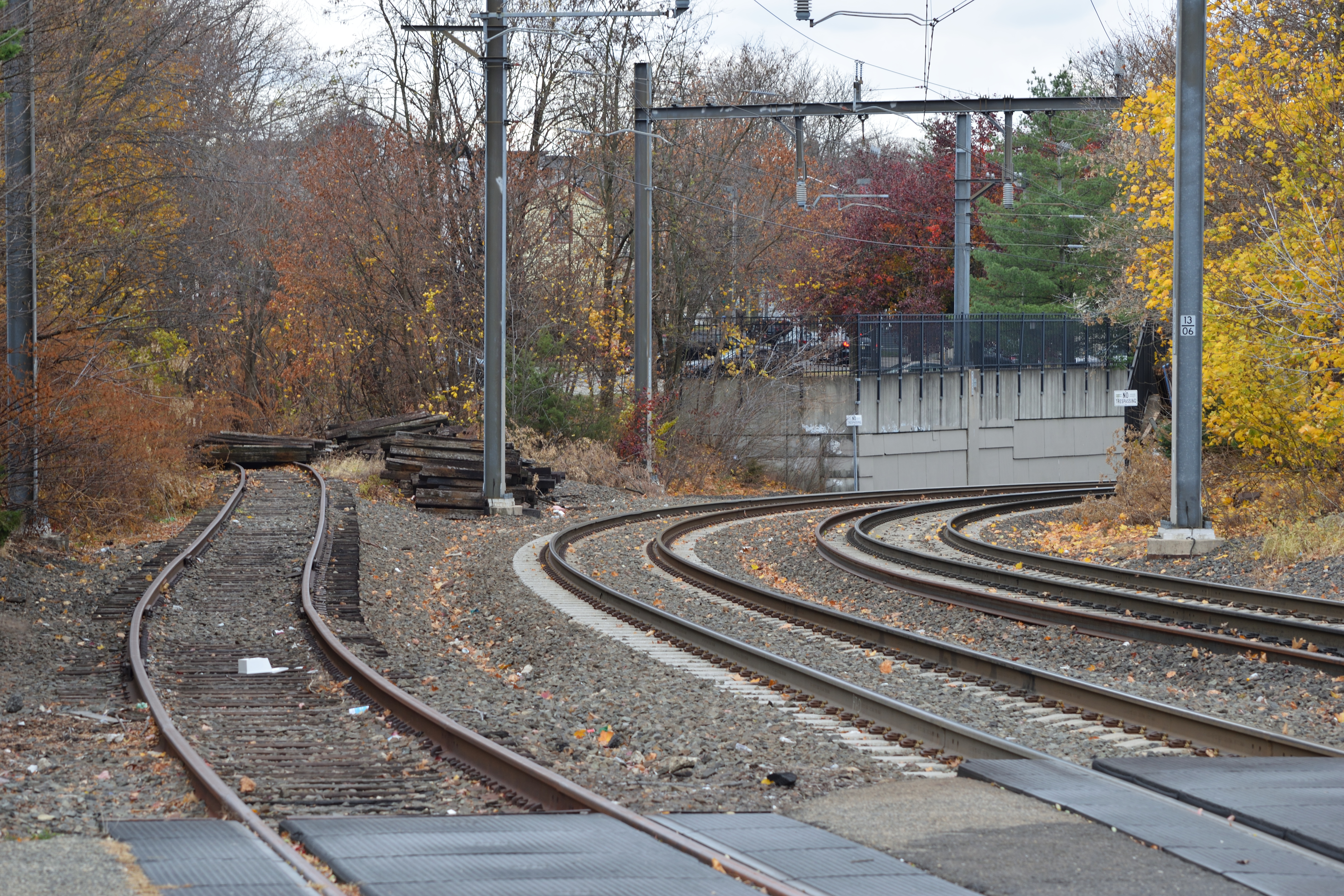
New track alignment to Hoboken curves to the right; old alignment (now removed) veers to the left.

The Montclair Connection was built to give passengers on the Boonton Line direct access to New York Penn Station; prior to the change, Boonton Line trains could only go to Hoboken Terminal. The idea for the connection was first proposed in 1929 when the Regional Plan Association proposed linking the Delaware, Lackawanna & Western Railroad's Montclair Branch with the Erie Railroad's Greenwood Lake Branch, but the plan was abandoned due to the economic difficulties associated with the Great Depression.

The merger between the Erie and Lackawanna Railroads in 1960 sped up the reconfiguration that was completed in March 1963, when the former Erie Main Line was connected to the Lackawanna’s Boonton Line south of Paterson station to form today’s Main Line. Meanwhile, the Boonton Line west of Mountain View station was linked to the Erie’s Greenwood Lake Branch to form the current Boonton Line.

The reconfiguration again spurred the Montclair Connection idea, and in preparation, service was cut back from Lackawanna Terminal to Bay Street by Conrail in 1981. But the proposal was introduced until the late 1980s, when New Jersey Transit proposed for a one-track connection that would have accommodated only diesel trains. Later, the plans were revised to include a two-track connection and five miles of overhead catenary wires, allowing for electric train service and increased travel destinations. After negotiations with the Township of Montclair, an agreement was reached in 1998, and construction began in 1999.
