= Montclair station =

Montclair station could refer to:

- Walnut Street station (NJ Transit) in Montclair, New Jersey, formerly named Montclair
- Montclair Transit Center in Montclair, California

== See also ==
- Montclair State University station, New Jersey
- Upper Montclair station, New Jersey
