= Mountain station =

Mountain station may refer to:

- Mountain Station, a commuter rail station in New Jersey, United States
- Mountain Avenue station, a commuter rail station in New Jersey, United States
- Top station, the highest station of a funicular, an aerial or T-bar lift, or a rack railway
