= Montclair State University station =

NJ Transit rail station

Montclair State University Station at Little Falls
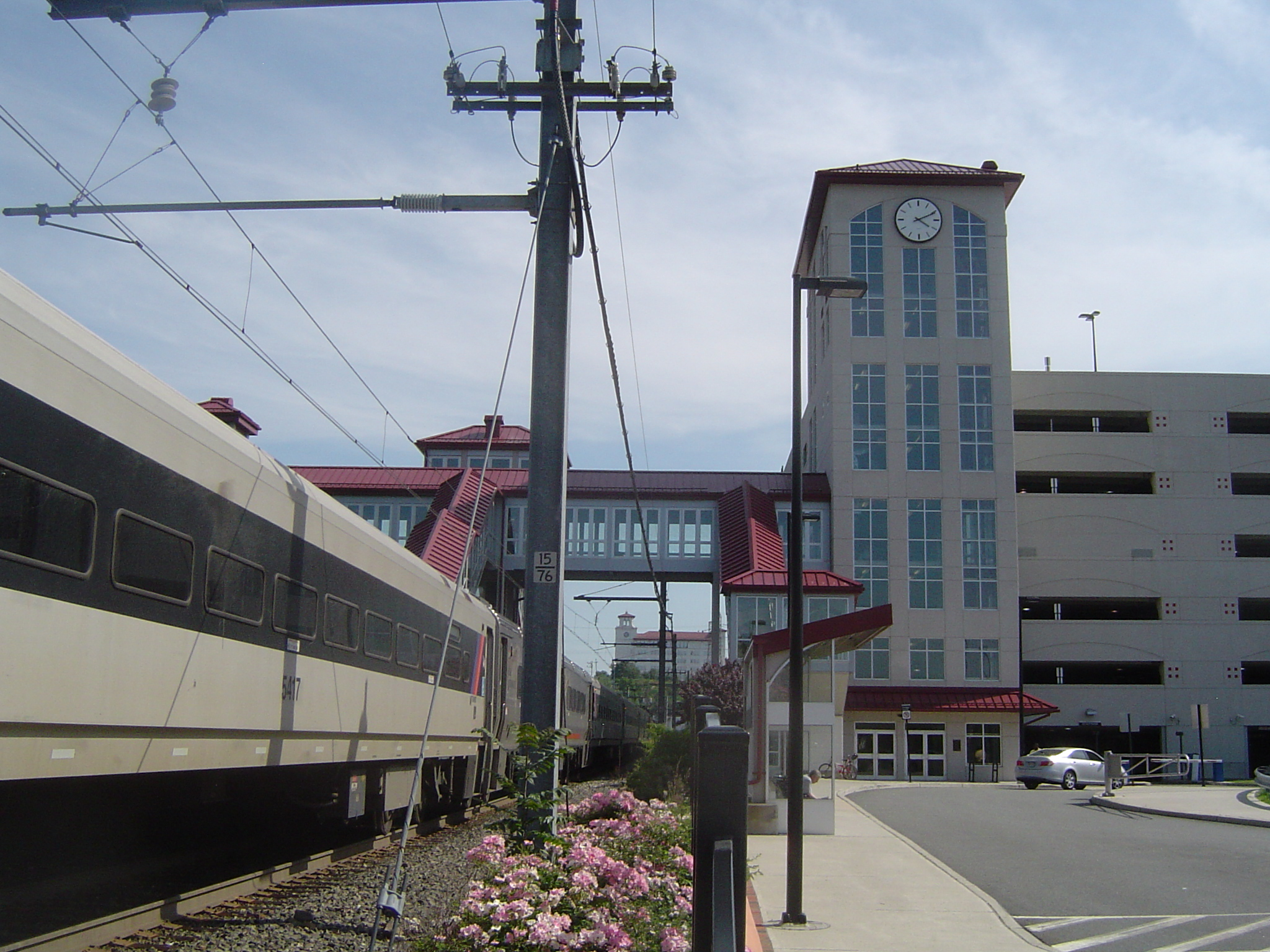
- Montclair State University station parking deck

General information
- Coordinates: 40.8695°N 74.1975°W
- Owner: NJ Transit
- Platforms: 1 high level island platform
- Tracks: 2
- Connections: MSU campus shuttles

Construction
- Parking: 1530 spots
- Accessible: Yes

Other information
- Fare zone: 6

History
- Opened: April 28, 2003 (unofficial); October 20, 2004 (official)

Passengers
- 2025: 336 (average weekday)
- Rank: 79 of 153

Services
Preceding station	NJ Transit	Following station
Little Falls limited service toward Hackettstown	Montclair–Boonton Line weekdays	Montclair Heights toward New York or Hoboken
Former services
Preceding station	NJ Transit	Following station
Great Notch toward Hackettstown	Montclair–Boonton Line until January 17, 2010	Montclair Heights toward New York or Hoboken
Location

Montclair State University, signed as Montclair State University Station at Little Falls, is a NJ Transit rail station on Clove Road near U.S. Route 46 and the Montclair State University campus in the Great Notch area of Little Falls, New Jersey on the Montclair–Boonton Line. The station opened in 2004.

== History ==
The station opened on October 20, 2004, and was built for $26 million, following the completion of the Montclair Connection. Although the station itself was not officially open, a temporary platform was built to allow the under-construction station to serve one of its main purposes as the Montclair-Boonton Line's primary transfer station.

== Station layout and service ==
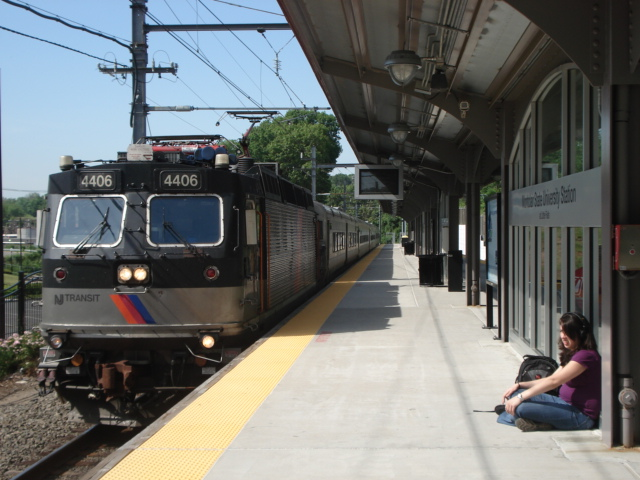
The Montclair State University station platform has screens which relate the departure and arrival times and destinations of trains.

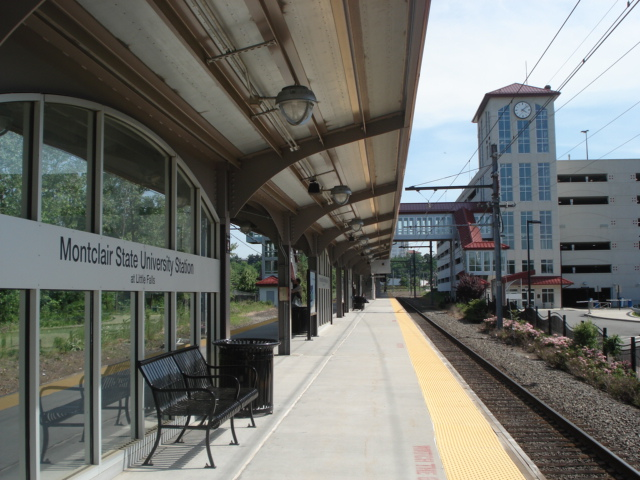
The parking garage as seen from the platform.

The station has two tracks and one sheltered, high-level island platform with an elevated walkway over the tracks connectied to the parking deck and college campus. The station is equipped with ticket machines and DepartureVision monitors displaying train statuses. It is handicapped accessible as the platform is fully elevated and elevators are available in addition to stairs. The station was intended to be a park-and-ride, near a highway and with a large parking deck.

There is no direct bus service; the university bus stop is on the opposite side of campus near the Montclair Heights station. Campus shuttles, however, do serve the station.

All Montclair–Boonton Line trains alight at this station. Midtown Direct service to New York Penn Station terminates here, as the line west of the nearby yard is not electrified. The station is a major transfer point for riders because many trains terminate here, it is the first station on the line with service to New York Penn Station, and it is the first local stop of express trains.

Montclair State University is not served on weekends, with weekend service on the line terminating at Bay Street.
