= Great Notch station =

Former New Jersey Transit rail station, Little Falls, NJ USA

Great Notch
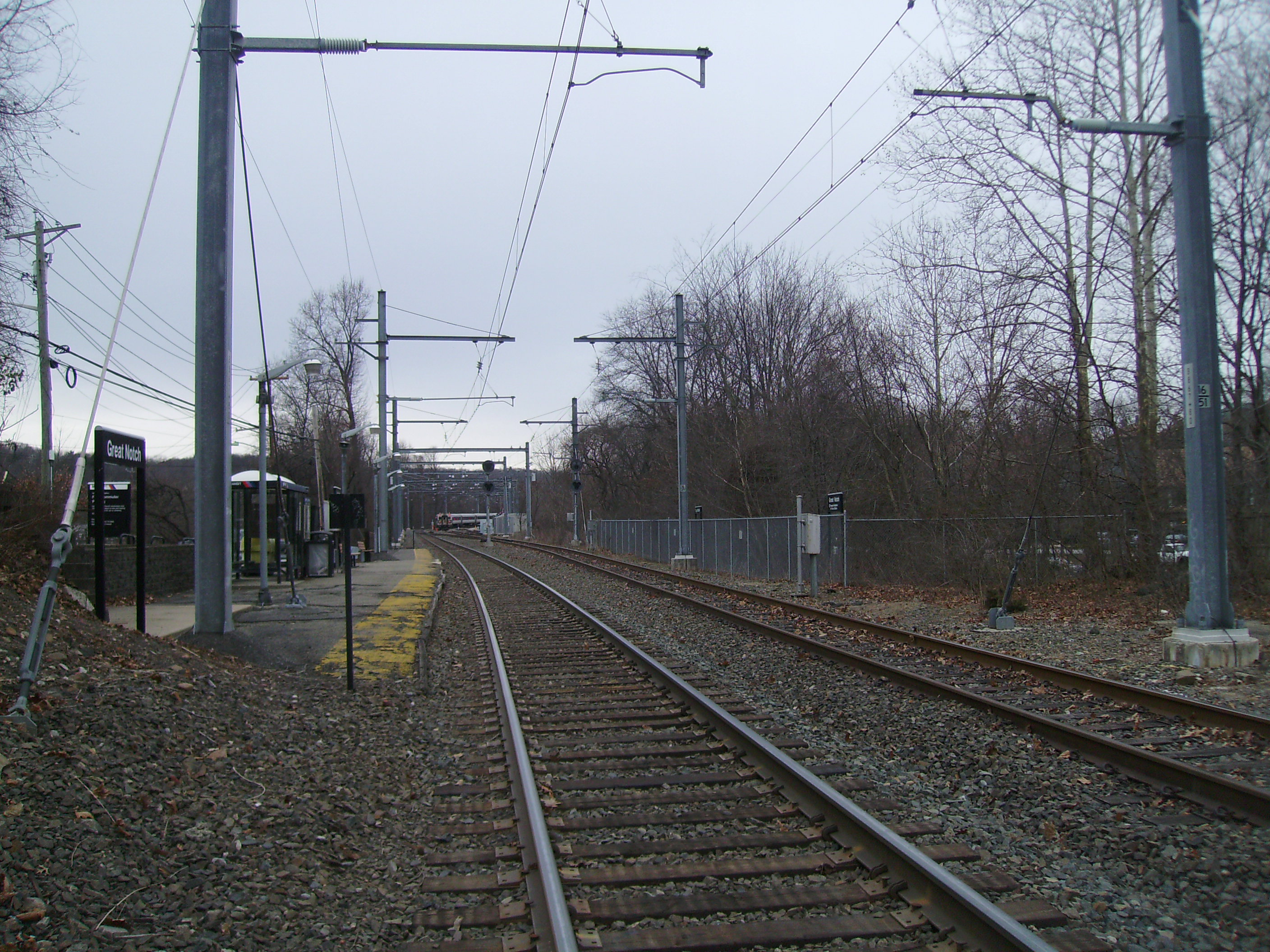
- The station on December 19, 2009, a month prior to closing.

General information
- Coordinates: 40.8738°N 74.2058°W
- Owner: New Jersey Transit
- Platforms: 1 side platform
- Tracks: 1 track, 1 siding
- Connections: NJT Bus: 191, 195, and 705

Construction
- Platform levels: Ground
- Parking: under 20
- Cycle facilities: No

Other information
- Station code: 1747 (Erie Railroad)
- Fare zone: 7

History
- Opened: January 1, 1873
- Closed: January 17, 2010
- Rebuilt: 1905, 1988
- Electrified: September 30, 2002
- Former names: Caldwell Junction

Key dates
- June 20, 1891: Caldwell Branch service began
- February 18, 1966: Station agency closed
- April 17, 1988: Depot caught fire

Passengers
- 2009: 2286 ▼87%

Former services
Preceding station	NJ Transit	Following station
Little Falls toward Hackettstown	Montclair–Boonton Line limited service	Montclair State University toward New York or Hoboken
Preceding station	Erie Railroad	Following station
Little Falls toward Sterling Forest	New York and Greenwood Lake Railway	Montclair Heights toward Jersey City
Cedar Grove toward Essex Fells	Caldwell Branch	Terminus
Location

Great Notch station was a small New Jersey Transit facility in the Great Notch section of Little Falls, New Jersey. The station was served seven times a day, three inbound morning trains to Hoboken Terminal and four outbound evening trains from Hoboken by the Montclair–Boonton Line from Monday to Friday. Located at the intersection of Notch Road and Long Hill Road, it was the second of three stations in Little Falls, the other two being Montclair State University and Little Falls and, after electrification, was the first on the line to be strictly served by diesel trains. However, most trains bypassed this station and continued on to Little Falls (westbound) and Montclair State University (eastbound). The station was served by a double track which ended west of the station. The last trains stopped at the station on January 15, 2010, at 7:41pm.

Train service at Great Notch originated in 1873, as part of the Montclair Railway. Service to Caldwell began in 1891, when the Caldwell Railway opened, serving Great Notch, Overbrook Hospital, Verona, and Caldwell. The station at Great Notch was first constructed in 1905 as a double station building for the Erie Railroad. The station was a green and red building serving the New York and Greenwood Lake Railway, along with the Caldwell Branch. The station also used an old boxcar as a tool shed for maintenance. By the early 1970s, the station had fallen into disrepair, and by 1974, was repainted Erie Railroad-style red with the tool shed box car removed. The station was abandoned when the Erie-Lackawanna Railroad went out of business and was later picked up by New Jersey Transit. After making deals with the mayor of Little Falls, New Jersey Transit gave the station a one-year "trial" to attract ridership. Ridership went down, however, and so the trial was canceled on December 18, 2009. The town of Little Falls was contacted by New Jersey Transit at that time, reporting that the Great Notch station would be closed on January 17, 2010 due to the "anemic" ridership at the station.

== History ==
Train service at Great Notch originated with the introduction of the Caldwell Railway, a service that went from the community of Caldwell, New Jersey to the New York & Greenwood Lake Railway. Twelve trains a day served Caldwell, Verona and Overbrook Hospital. The station at Great Notch was deemed Caldwell Junction, inferring the junction between the two railways. The branch was extended the following year to the municipality of Essex Fells, where it connected with the Morristown & Erie Railroad after the latter was extended to that point in 1903.

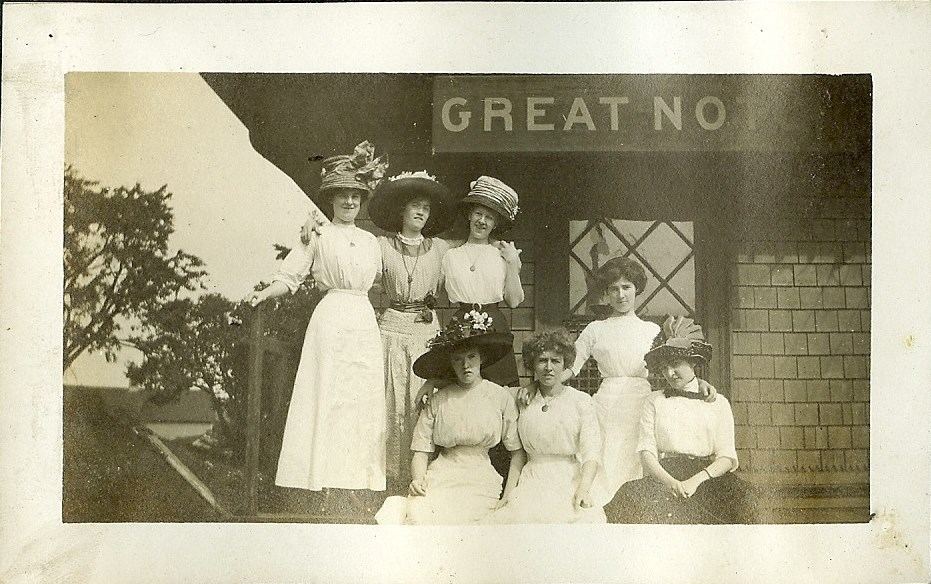
Great Notch station c. 1912

The Great Notch station depot was built in 1905 for the New York & Greenwood Lake Railway, a subsidiary of the Erie Railroad. The station was built as a green-red "type five" frame structure. While the main building was 12' × 28' × 18' in size, the station also included an old boxcar used as a tool house. The box car was only 12' × 45' and served the station for several decades. The station (telegraph call "GA") was just west of the Great Notch interlocking signal tower (telegraph call "GN"), which was built in 1900 to serve the junction of the Greenwood Lake Railway and its Caldwell Branch, heading south (railroad westbound) for the communities of Cedar Grove, Verona, Caldwell and Essex Fells. The station also served a local yard for train storage for the branch line via a wye. At Essex Fells, connections could be made for train service to Morristown via the Morristown and Erie Railroad. The Caldwell Railroad diverged from the current New Jersey Transit line about 0.25 miles (0.40 km) west of the New Jersey Transit Great Notch station and followed its own route to Caldwell. The station at Great Notch was more than just a building for people at the railroad. The station had a large water tower next to GA Signal and a potbelly stove. The station was tended by a husband and wife combination, serving the locals their daily newspapers and their mail. Great Notch did not receive mail delivery until the mid-1950s.

By the early 1970s, the Great Notch station, which was falling into disrepair, received a new paint job, changed from the red-green-cream colors for the Erie Railroad to a new all red Erie Lackawanna paint scheme. The abandoned tool shed made out of the old wooden boxcar was also removed. Due to the removal of the tool boxcar, the propane tanks that heated the station building were also made visible. After the ending of the Erie Lackawanna Railroad in 1976, the Great Notch station lay abandoned. In June 1979, the State of New Jersey began to remove the tracks for the Caldwell Branch, which also lay abandoned at Great Notch. Currently, what was the track leading to the Caldwell Branch is a siding. On April 16, 1988, the newly rehabilitated station building was destroyed by fire. The burned out structure was razed on April 23. New Jersey Transit, who owned the station depot, replaced it with glass structures to seat 90 people.

During the construction of the Montclair Connection in 2001, the adjacent Great Notch Yard received a major upgrade, becoming a new state-of-the-art yard with new trains storage facilities.

== Closure ==
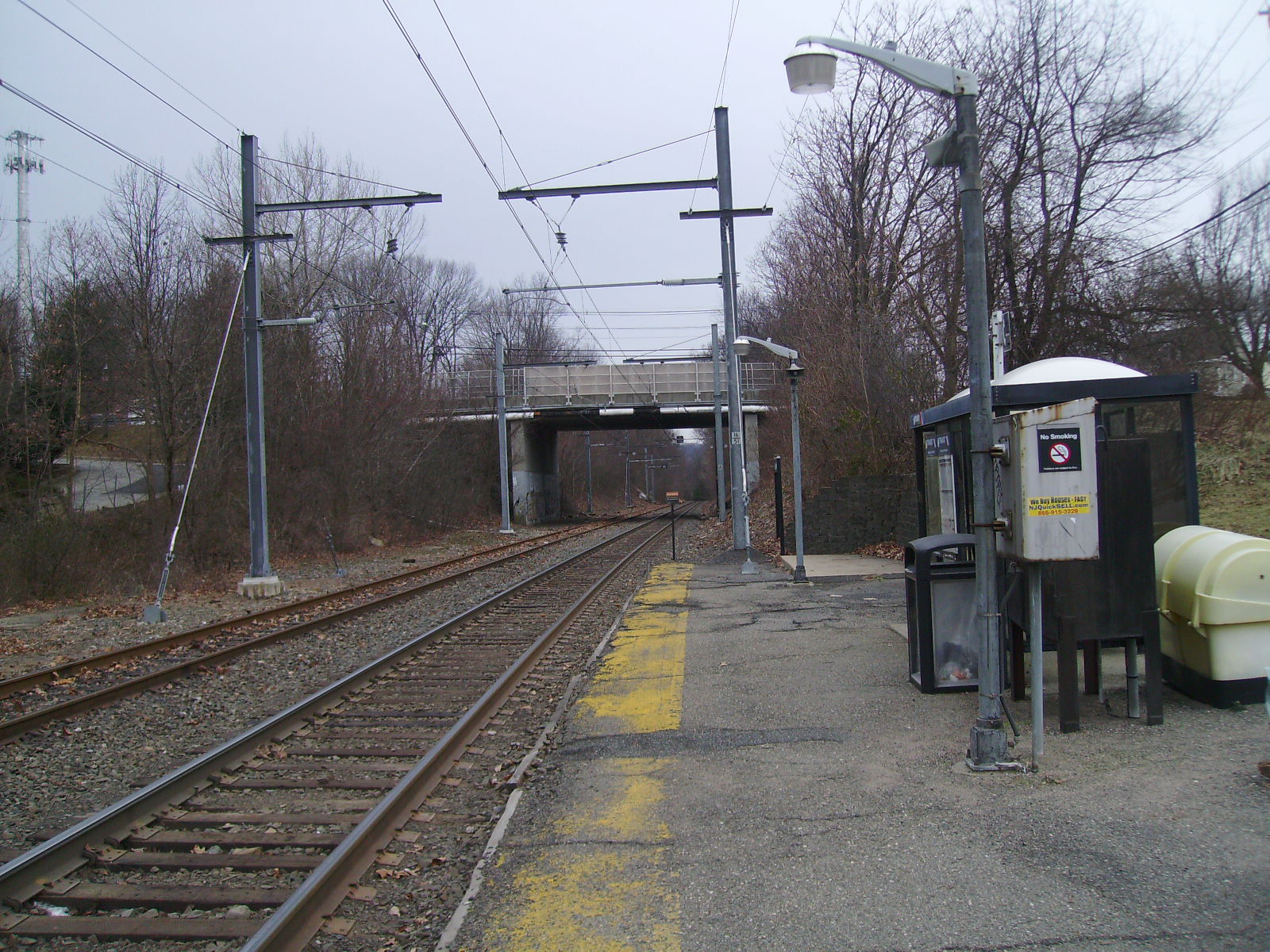
The station looking towards Hackettstown prior to closure

The opening of the Montclair State University station in 2004 and the Wayne Route 23 Transit Center's train platform in 2008 made Great Notch one of three stations in Little Falls, and it did not have nearly the ridership of either of the two other stations. The opening of nearby Montclair State University Station pulled away commuters from Great Notch. The small parking lot facing the station had very little room for cars and a parking lot on the opposite side of the single tracked station was isolated from it by fencing. Further exacerbating the problem was that the small lot abutting Notch Road was not marked specifically for train passengers only. Great Notch had (and still has) a bus stop on the corner of Notch and Long Hill Roads that serves buses headed for Port Authority Bus Terminal, and commuters using the bus would park in the train station's parking lot (and still do, as it was never blocked off) and catch the bus up the street.

In January 2008, without knowledge of the township council, New Jersey Transit announced further and drastic service cuts at Great Notch. The only train to serve outbound customers was a train leaving for Hoboken Terminal in the morning, and two trains from Hoboken would serve the station at night.

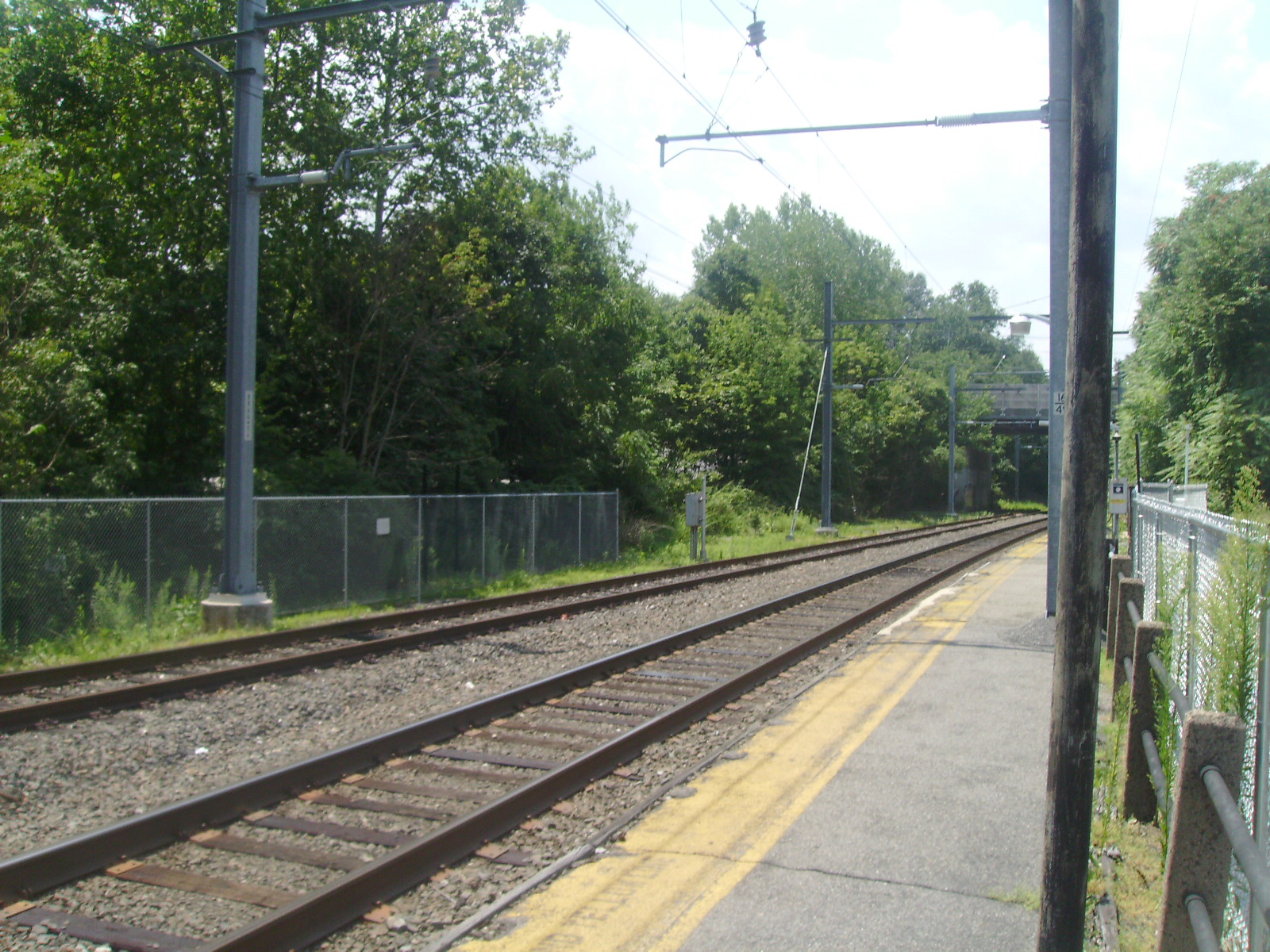
The site at Great Notch station in July 2010, six months after the closing of the station by New Jersey Transit

The future of the 103-year-old station was placed into further jeopardy on August 12, 2008, when New Jersey Transit announced to the community of Little Falls that it might close the station as early as October 2008. A few days after the announcement, rebuttal by the community began to appear; a public hearing was announced for September 3 to work on plans for Great Notch. The service with only one inbound train (to Hoboken) and two outbound trains (from Hoboken) was canceled on April 1, 2009. On that day, New Jersey Transit announced it would add two more trains in each direction on April 16 as a "one-year trial" for station ridership. The town hoped to get the then 67-person a day average to 100 people using the station by April 1, 2010, when the trial was set to expire. The mayor of Little Falls, Michael DeFrancisci, urged people to use the station more. However, by December 2009, ridership had declined to nine riders per day.

On December 18, 2009, New Jersey Transit contacted Little Falls and said that the station would close in January 2010, three months before the year-long trial period was set to end. It cited continued low ridership, as on average of nine passengers a day boarded the train at Great Notch. On December 21, 2009, New Jersey Transit announced the closure, stating that "anemic" ridership continued at Great Notch, with an average of only nine riders a day, compared to 203 at the Little Falls station and 597 at the Montclair State University Station. The last train to depart Great Notch was the 6:51 pm train from Hoboken Terminal on January 15, 2010, leaving Great Notch at 7:41 pm.

== See also ==
- Caldwell Branch to Essex Fells

== Bibliography ==
- Baxter, Raymond J.; Adams, Arthur G. (1999). Railroad Ferries of the Hudson: And Stories of a Deckhand. Fordham, New York: Fordham University Press. ISBN 9780823219544.
- Catlin, George L. (1873). Homes on the Montclair Railway, for New York Business Men. A Description of the Country Adjacent to the Montclair Railway, Between Jersey City and Greenwood Lake. New York, New York: Montclair Railway Company.
- Whittemore, Henry (1894). History of Montclair Township, State of New Jersey: Including the History of Families who Have Been Identified with Its Growth and Prosperity. New York, New York: The Suburban Publishing Company.
