= Little Falls station =

NJ Transit rail station

Coordinates: 40°52′50″N 74°14′07″W

Little Falls
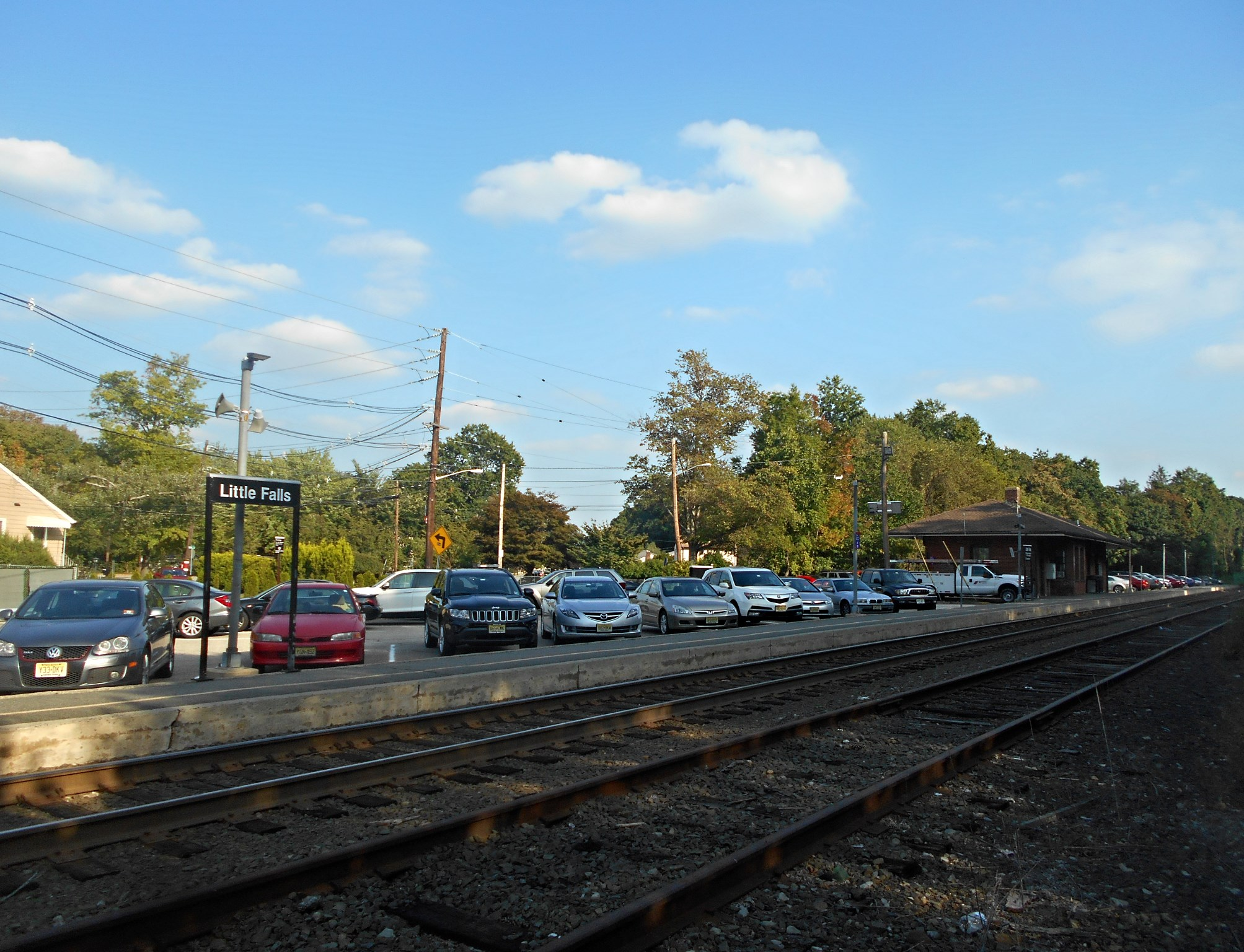
- Little Falls station building in September 2014 facing eastbound towards Great Notch.

General information
- Location: Union Avenue, Little Falls, New Jersey 07424
- Owner: NJ Transit
- Platforms: 1 side platform
- Tracks: 1 revenue track and 1 siding
- Connections: NJT Bus: 11, 28, 191, 704, and 705 (on Main Street)

Construction
- Parking: 134 parking spaces
- Cycle facilities: Lockers available

Other information
- Station code: 1765 (Erie Railroad)
- Fare zone: 8

History
- Opened: January 1, 1873
- Rebuilt: July 1879
- Electrified: Not electrified

Passengers
- 2025: 87 (average weekday)
- Rank: 123 of 153

Services
Preceding station	NJ Transit	Following station
Wayne Route 23 toward Hackettstown	Montclair–Boonton Line limited service	Montclair State University toward New York or Hoboken
Former services
Preceding station	NJ Transit	Following station
Wayne Route 23 toward Hackettstown	Montclair–Boonton Line until January 17, 2010	Great Notch toward New York or Hoboken
Preceding station	Erie Railroad	Following station
Singac toward Sterling Forest	New York and Greenwood Lake Railway	Great Notch toward Jersey City
Location

Little Falls is an active commuter railroad station in the eponymous township of Little Falls, Passaic County, New Jersey. The station, located at the end of Union Boulevard, serves trains of NJ Transit's Montclair–Boonton Line only during rush hour. Trains go between New York Penn Station, Hoboken Terminal to Dover and Hackettstown. The station is one of several stops west of Great Notch Yard and east of Denville station that does not have electrified railroad service, resulting in less frequent service. Little Falls station contains a single low-level side platform and the former Erie Railroad-built brick station depot.

Railroad service in Little Falls began on January 1, 1873 with the opening of the Montclair Railway, a short line that would become the New York and Greenwood Lake Railway, a subsidiary of the Erie Railroad. Originally one of four stations in the township built by the Erie Railroad, Little Falls is the last remaining station after Great Notch closed on January 17, 2010. Montclair State University station is also within the municipality.

== History ==
=== Opening and early history (1873–1910) ===
The first railroad service through Little Falls came on January 1, 1873 with the opening of the Montclair Railway from Jersey City to Sterling Forest on the shore of Greenwood Lake. At the time of opening, the line had two stations in the township: Great Notch and one called Little Falls. Little Falls station was 18 miles (29 km) and 63 minutes from Jersey City, serving twelve trains per day. Joseph Cooke was named the first station agent at Little Falls station in 1873. He also served as the telegraph operator.

Little Falls at the time of the railroad opening was a small community, with a local school, stores, churches and the Beattie Carpet Mill, which opened in 1842. The municipality also had two stagecoach runs to Paterson and three runs of mail service. At the time of opening, the township saw the railroad as beneficial for the community, given that trips to get to any area railroad station would involve a ride by horse of at least 1-mile (1.6 km). Speculation was that a new station on the line would promote rapid development of the area as people would want to move on a permanent and temporary basis to Little Falls. However, they felt that the growth would be held back by wealthy landowners who did not want to sell their land for development, despite the profit opportunities.

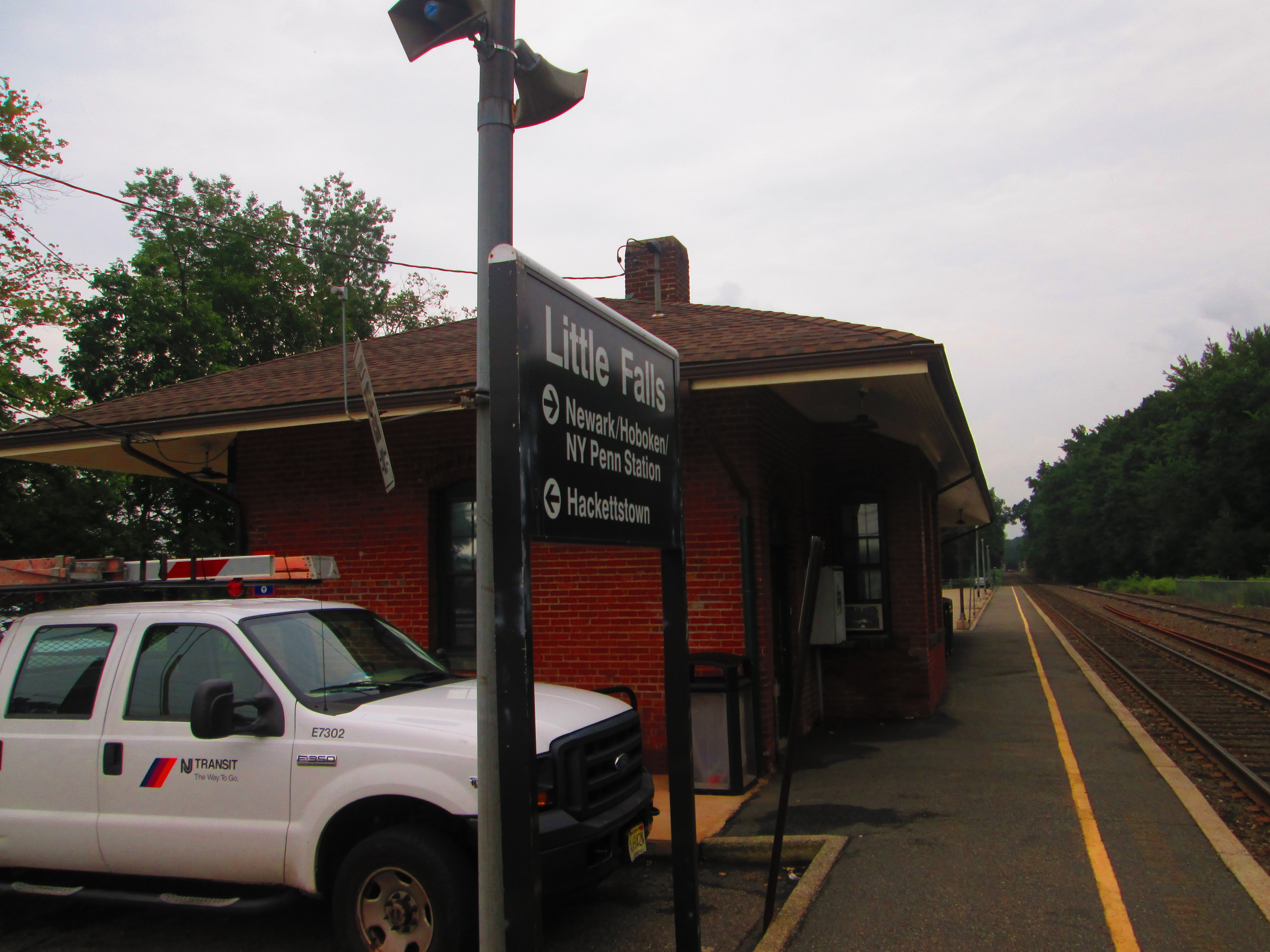
The 1879-built station depot at Little Falls, seen in September 2013

The original station depot at Little Falls was a small shanty for Cooke to use. In mid-July 1879, the New York and Greenwood Lake Railway (the successor of the Montclair Railway) announced that they would replace the shanty with a new station depot. Reacting to an article in the Montclair Times suggesting that the railroad make Little Falls a major terminus instead of Montclair Heights station, the railroad announced that they would build a new station depot, a brick structure that would be open by August 1879.

=== Ownership and refurbishment (1976–1979) ===
Little Falls station and the Boonton Line fell under the guise of the Consolidated Rail Corporation (Conrail) on April 1, 1976 after the federal government took over the Erie Lackawanna Railroad. By October 1976, local officials were asking the New Jersey Department of Transportation (NJDOT) about funding to refurbish the two active stations in the township. NJDOT stated that they did not have funds left from a 1968 state bond issue and that they would have to rely on other sources for funding to repair the stations. Officials showed concern about the poor condition of both railroad stations, stating that they were both in a dilapidated state and were problems for traffic in the area. Little Falls station had the depot and the parking lot in poor condition, with the latter having few or no markings.

Passaic County's planner, John Mancinelli, performed a study of all the active railroad stations in the county, suggesting that a new park and ride could be built on County Route 620 (Clove Road) at the site of a defunct quarry owned by Montclair State College to replace Great Notch and Montclair Heights stations. Mancinelli suggested that since Conrail owned the Little Falls station parking lot, that they would be able to get the agency to improve it with a little municipal force.

Progress languished through early 1977 and by June, the only thing accomplished was the installation of a fence. Little Falls station had potholes growing in the un-maintained parking lot, which also was poorly lit while the depot had bricks falling off the frame. The municipality stated that routine maintenance should not be their responsibility, but Conrail responded that they would not spend the money out of pocket to upgrade the facilities and that any project would have to come from state funding. NJDOT added that Conrail should be the one to maintain the depots and that Conrail had a poor track record on getting things done. Joseph Harvey, a public relations officer for Conrail, added that the options for the station would be maintenance or demolition of the two station depots. Harvey stated that if maintenance were occurring on routine basis that it would be better to level the structures. He reiterated that any funding would need 100% reimbursement from the state, requiring approvals from Little Falls, Passaic County, NJDOT and Conrail.

However, the township planner suggested that they should purchase the two depots from the railroad, an offer Harvey stated that they would consider. He added that if the properties had free and clear title, they would negotiate a deal to sell the structures. Reorganization from the Erie Lackawanna Railroad bankruptcy could have potentially put a lien on the structure, making it tougher for the acquisition to occur. NJDOT stated that this lien would have to be taken care of by October 1978. Any acquisition plans would have to involved federal funding as well, requiring multiple bureaucratic approvals.

Progress again stalled after a meeting between the township engineer and Conrail resulted in the municipality being told they would not be considering any property sales through 1982. The Township Advisory Commission showed interest in purchasing the properties, but the discussion resulted in no progress being made on purchasing the stations or getting Conrail to improve the facilities. The township continued pressuring Conrail to do some upgrades, but noted that getting the railroad to do mundane tasks in maintenance was tough enough of a job. The Commission stated that they would have to get money to purchase the Little Falls station from private fundraising and aid from the township, turning the facility into a museum for local history. In October 1977, a year after showing interest in getting the stations repaired, Assemblyman Emil Olszowy (R–35th District) offered to get involved in the fight. The township building inspector, Karl Grimm, added that writing numerous letters to Conrail had led to no progress or responses and thought that Olszowy's influence on NJDOT could help push Conrail to do something. Grimm added that Conrail officials were invited to have someone meet with the Township Planning Board, but had declined on multiple occasions.

The fight over responsibility continued into 1978. Before more negotiations, the Board of Public Utilities inspected both Great Notch and Little Falls stations in January and March, resulting in a letter about the dilapidated conditions. At Little Falls station, the inspection showed that along with the missing bricks, boards had come free of the roof and the station's gutters leaked during rain. Joe Harvey insisted that while Conrail was responsible for routine maintenance as part of their contract with NJDOT, the state would be responsible for any renovation projects. NJDOT agreed with Harvey that they would have to spend money to repair the two depots. Morey Epstein of NJDOT stated that there was no immediate funding budgeted to repair and/or renovate both stations, but noted that an option in the contract with Conrail was coming up on September 17, 1978 to purchase some stations and which railroad lines to have Conrail operate. Any stations that NJDOT would purchase would then be flipped to the municipality where it was located. In making their decisions, the state would consider the future potential of the station. Epstein added that some state funding could possibly be made available for small repairs of both stations.

Martin Robins, Assistant Commissioner for NJDOT, told people at a meeting with the New Jersey Mayors Association and New Jersey County Transportation Association in June 1978 that the agency would be unveiling a new program in which they would purchase all 137 stations from Conrail and then lease them for free to the 95 municipalities that contained a station. The entire set, which would cost less than $1.5 million, would need approval from the Commuter Operation Agency (slated for August 1978). In 1979, NJDOT would then begin the process of leasing out the stations. Robert Irvine, the chairman of the Planning Board, stated that he would prefer the stations fixed up before the responsibility would be turned over to the township, adding that a local Boy Scouts troop had offered to paint Great Notch station, but was declined because of union contracts. The Commuter Operating Agency approved the deal on August 29, allowing NJDOT to spend $17.5 million for acquisition of 130 stations and 374 miles (602 km) of rail lines in the state. The deal would need to be done by September 18 due to the option on the contract, but could change if the United States Congress would approve an extension of the option period. With the deal, NJDOT would then request $600 million in federal funding to renovate, upgrade and refurbish the stations. Irvine added that a local planner, Stanley Lacz, was working on improvement drawings for both Great Notch and Little Falls stations. Irvine added that part of these drawings would include repairing the roofs of both stations, installing new windows and repairing the parking lots at both facilities.

The deal became official by September 22. Little Falls Mayor Fred DeFuria noted his frustration with Conrail's lack of maintenance and praised NJDOT's decision to purchase the stations. DeFuria added that the municipality would consider charging a parking fee at both stations to help with maintenance costs under the new leases, but only once the stations had their parking lots both paved. DeFuria stated that the township look into grants to permit repair of the depots and the parking lots along with fundraising for a historical museum at one of the stations. The Little Falls Historical Society would have their choice of which station, but stated his preference for Great Notch station as the museum. It came to Irvine's attention that someone had been doing maintenance work at Little Falls station's parking lot during the weekends of September 17–18 and September 23–24 without notifying municipal officials. The mystery organization had milled the parking lot and removed the potholes. Irvine added that it appeared they were about to start paving the lot and the Township Committee asked that calls be made to find out who the mystery construction workers were operating for. Irvine added that once they found the mystery agency that they would like a say in what happens to the facility. The municipality confirmed that the agency was Conrail working on the parking lots on September 26, 1978, when work on the lot resumed. A spokesperson from Conrail notified the municipality that the workers were trying to improve some of the problems with the facility's parking lot, adding that rock would be placed to help make it smoother for vehicles, but confirmed it did not expect to pave the lot. NJDOT denied that it had anything to do with the sudden change of heart, stating that Conrail might have used money from a grant or general funds for the work.

NJDOT held a meeting with Irvine and the Planning Board on October 4, 1978. At this meeting, NJDOT announced that they would soon begin work on repairs to Little Falls station. The agency would give Conrail funding to repair or replace the station depot roof, inserting new windows, painting the interior and exterior of the structure. They added that they would also consider installing new doors on the depot. The project would also include possibility of paving the parking lot and installing new curbs, lights and doing general landscaping. NJDOT reiterated that the mystery work by Conrail was not their responsibility and unrelated to the future plans for the station. They also added that a specialized group of Conrail staff was being hired to do the station repairs throughout the state of New Jersey. If all went correctly, construction would start by November 1978. At the same time, they added that their proposal was to demolish the Great Notch depot and replace it with a shelter to do more lighting work, but that nothing would happen until other avenues were explored.

Work began on the renovations to Little Falls station in November 1978, but interrupted by a fire on December 3, 1978 in which the depot sustained minor damage. The fire was extinguished in 15 minutes after the 10:38 p.m. report of fire and Conrail inspected the station depot around midnight on December 4. Little Falls Police declared the fire one of suspicious nature. Work resumed in April 1979 of the station depot with work on the depot's plumbing and electrical issues. Irvine announced that the roof would also be replaced entirely rather than repaired and that a new bench for commuters had been installed on the platform. The work also would add new exterior lighting to the station, along with new heating systems.

In May 1979, the state offered the depots to the municipality for a long-term lease at $1 per year. This would include maintenance for the structures, funded by parking fees and rental opportunities from the Little Falls station. Both sides noted that Great Notch station did not represent enough of a profit for the municipality or the state but that the money acquired from Little Falls station would be enough to maintain both structures. Officials held a ribbon-cutting ceremony for the renovations at Little Falls station on October 19, 1979. Transportation Commissioner Louis Gambaccini, Assemblyman William J. Bate (D–35th District) and Mayor Charles Pullara were those who cut the ribbon in front of the station depot. They also added that the bathrooms at the depot were renovated. Pullara also noted that he intended to turn the depot into the historical museum and a local transit center for the municipality.

== Station layout and services ==
Little Falls station is located at the end of Union Avenue (County Route 646) in the township, with access also available from Montclair Avenue (CR 645) on the west end of the station via Railroad Avenue. The station contains a single low-level side platform on the east side of the single main revenue track and passenger train siding. Little Falls station contains one parking lot around the existing station depot, owned and operated by NJ Transit. This parking lot has 134 spaces, only one of which is accessible for handicapped persons. All parking is free of charge and overnight parking is allowed. The station also contains a single ticket vending machine next to the station depot and has bicycle lockers on the platform.

The station at Little Falls is operated by trains of NJ Transit's Montclair–Boonton Line. The next station to the west is Wayne Route 23 Transit Center and the next station to the east is Montclair State University, which is also in Little Falls. Little Falls station is in fare zone 8, the only station on the line in that fare zone. Access is also available to NJ Transit's 11, 191, 704 and 705 bus lines.

== See also ==
- Singac, New Jersey

== Bibliography ==
- Baxter, Raymond J.; Adams, Arthur G. (1999). Railroad Ferries of the Hudson: And Stories of a Deckhand. Fordham, New York: Fordham University Press. ISBN 9780823219544.
- Catlin, George L. (1873). Homes on the Montclair Railway, for New York Business Men. A Description of the Country Adjacent to the Montclair Railway, Between Jersey City and Greenwood Lake. New York, New York: Montclair Railway Company.
- Whittemore, Henry (1894). History of Montclair Township, State of New Jersey: Including the History of Families who Have Been Identified with Its Growth and Prosperity. New York, New York: The Suburban Publishing Company.
