= Anderson Park (New Jersey) =

County park in Montclair, New Jersey, United States

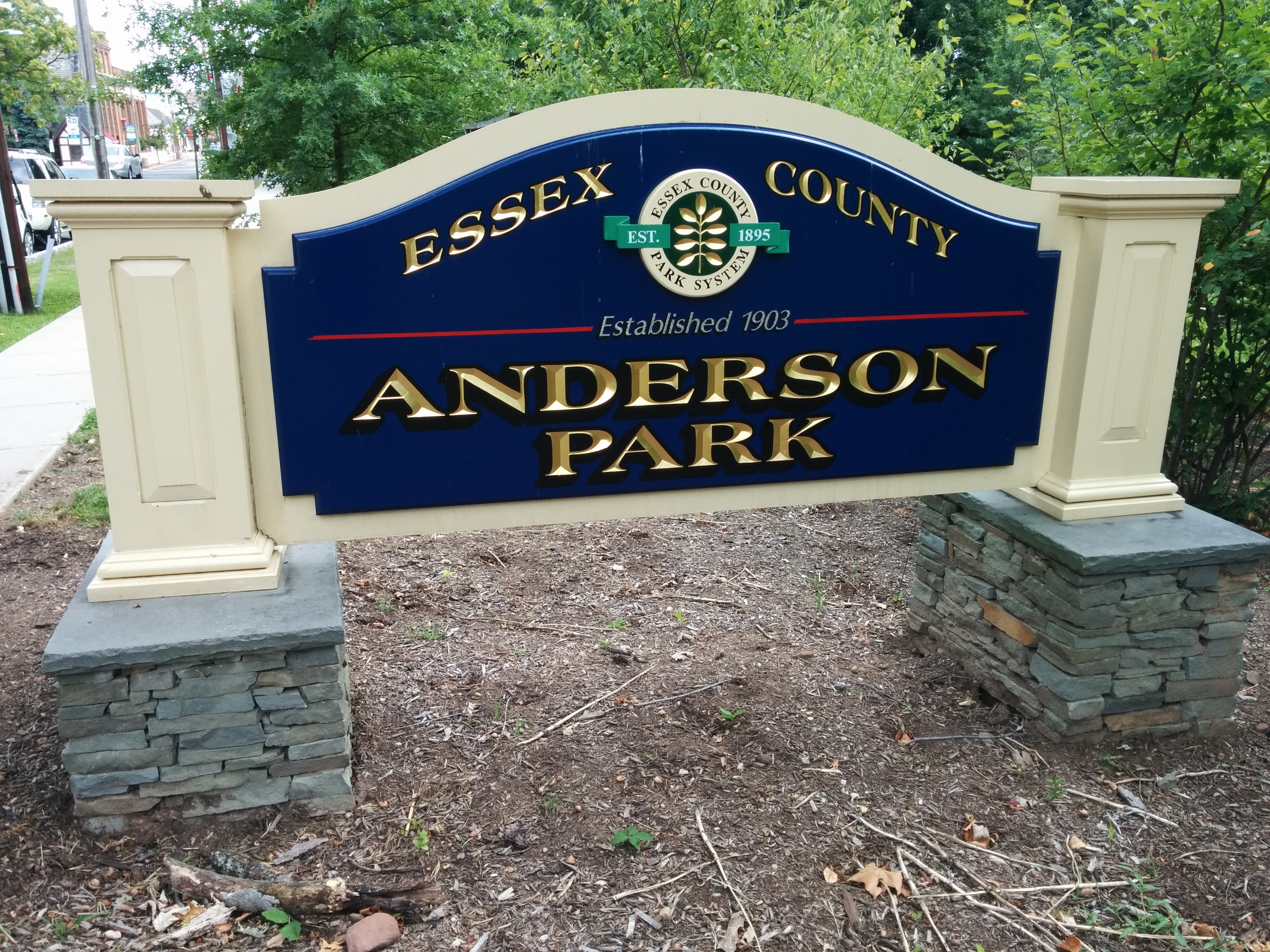
- Sign on Bellevue Avenue
- Interactive map of Anderson Park
- Type: Public Park
- Location: Montclair, New Jersey
- Coordinates: 40.827853°N 74.245289°W
- Area: 14.85 acres (60,100 m^{2})
- Created: 1905
- Operator: Essex County
- Open: All year
- Public transit: Upper Montclair (NJT station)

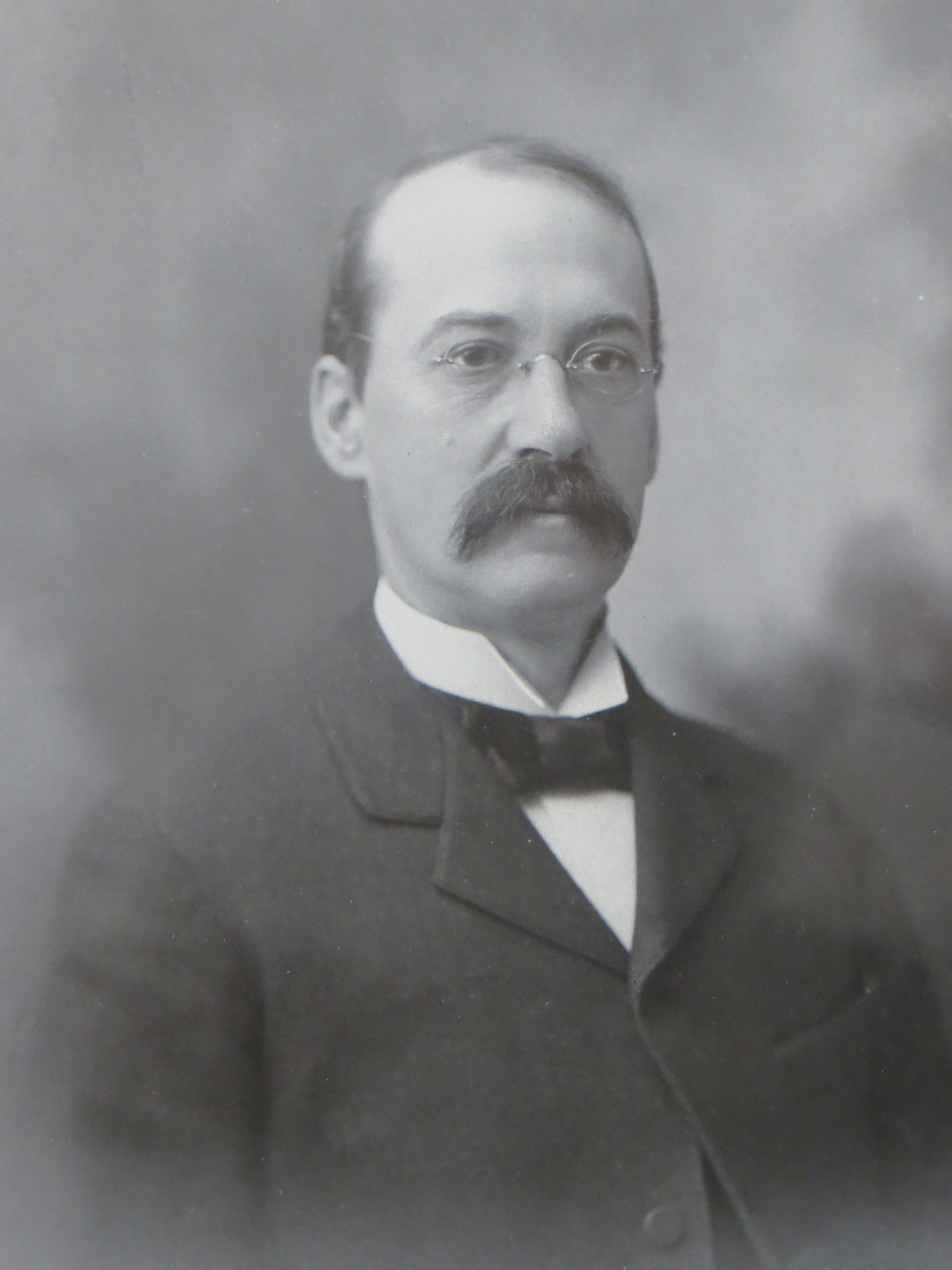
A portrait of Charles W. Anderson.

Anderson Park is a county park located in Montclair, New Jersey, United States. Anderson Park is part of the Essex County Park System.

== History ==
=== Early history ===
In 1902, Montclair resident Charles W. Anderson offered to donate 14.85 acres of parkland to the Essex County Park Commission. This came at a time when Essex County was facing a lot of population growth, which brought more homes and less greenery. While Montclair was shifting away from a focus on agriculture and into suburban development, the community recognized a need for parkland.

Fredrick Law Olmsted Sr. died in 1903, but his stepson, John Charles Olmsted, designed Anderson Park. The elder Olmsted was best known for designing Central Park in Manhattan, and his successor firm also designed many of Essex County's parks. For Montclair, the landscape architects envisioned a "neighborhood park". At a time when Theodore Roosevelt was dedicating land to America's national parks, voters quickly approved a park bond issue so that Essex County would accept Anderson's donation.

The park was called Montclair Park until 1909 when the name was changed to Anderson Park at the request of the town to honor Charles W. Anderson.

=== Modern Day ===
In 2006, Friends of Anderson Park formed to rejuvenate the original 1904 Olmsted Planting Plan. Since then, the conservancy has planted more than 230 trees and shrubs.

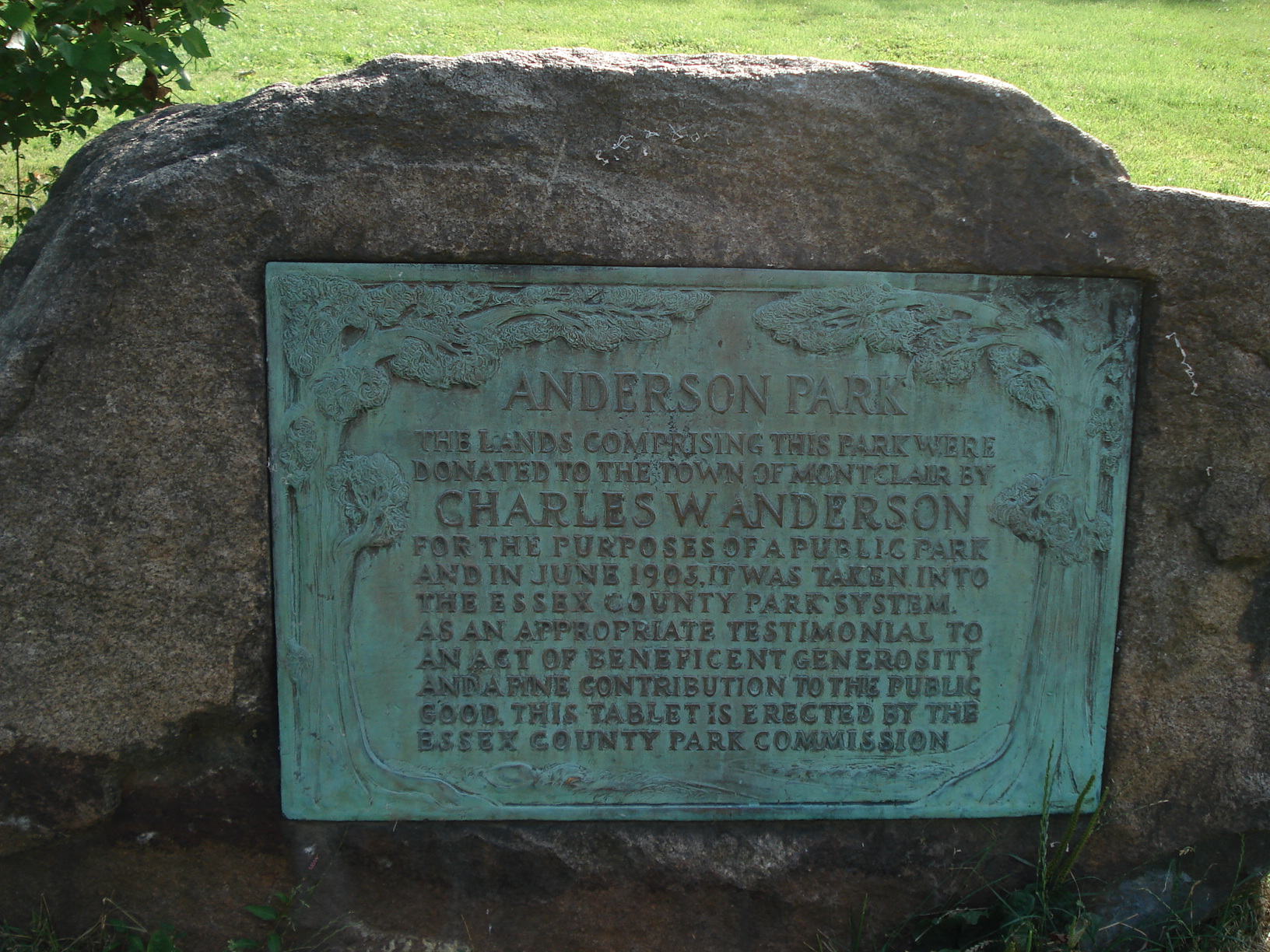
Plaque commemorating Charles W. Anderson

== Qualities ==
Anderson Park was designed to be versatile and open. It features a meadow, boulders, benches, and pathways. A pear-shaped main loop surrounds the meadow; a smaller inner loop diverges on the southeast end of the park. The park is popular with families, joggers, dog walkers, picnickers, and athletes. Each June, the park is home to the Music Under the June Moon chamber music concert, and in September the Fine Arts and Crafts Fair comes to the park.

== Location ==
Anderson Park is just south of the Upper Montclair Train Station and just west of the historic Upper Montclair business district. Toney's Brook flows through the east side of the park, parallel to the railroad tracks.

== Gallery ==
Anderson Park Gallery

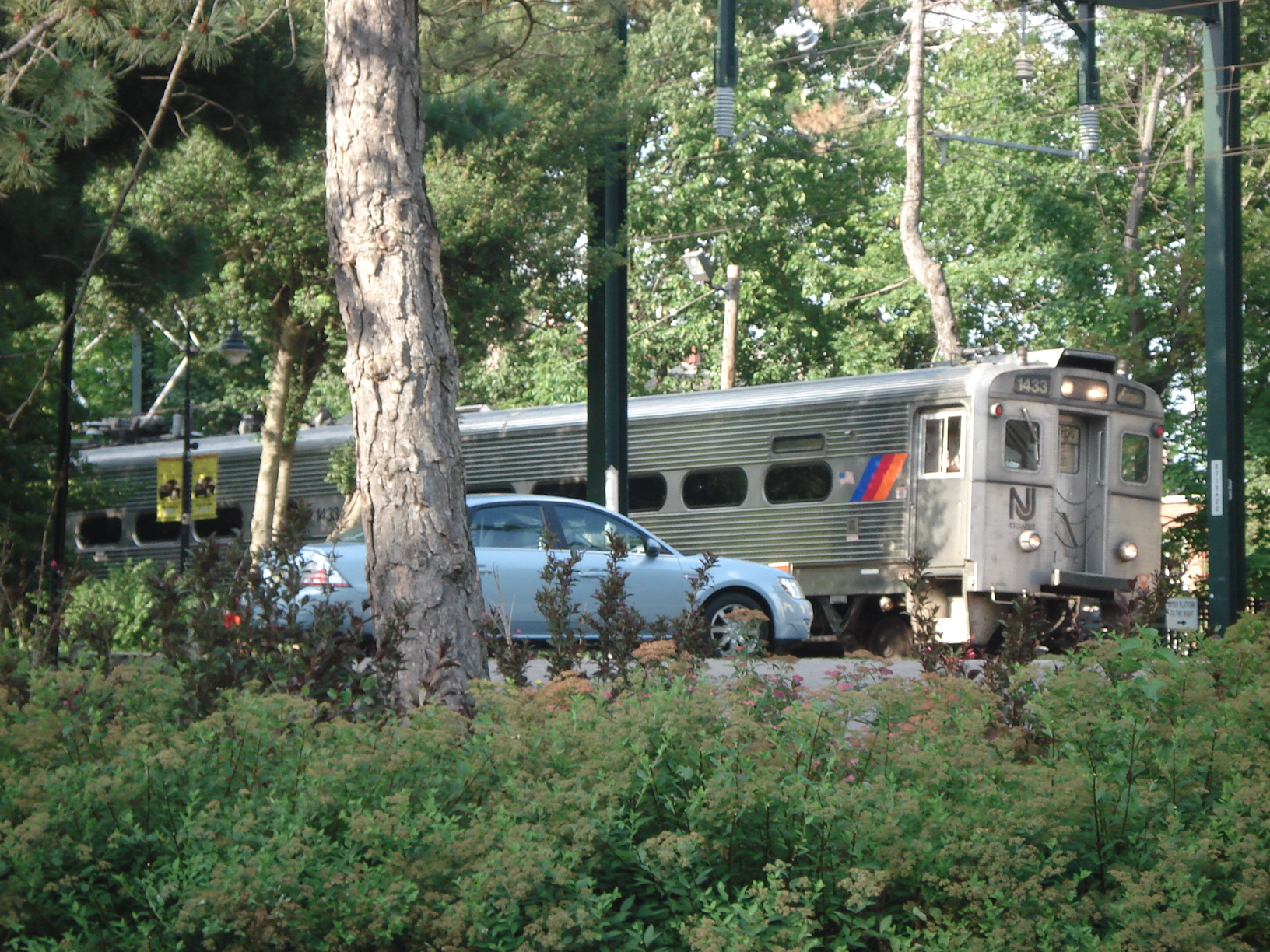
The Upper Montclair Railway Station from Anderson Park

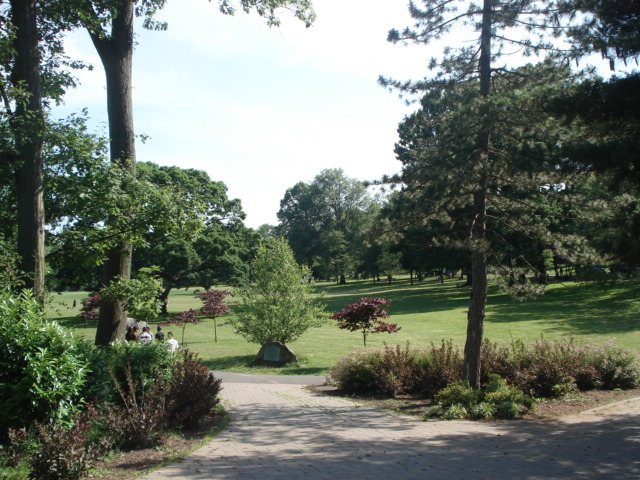
Anderson Park from Bellevue Avenue Entrance

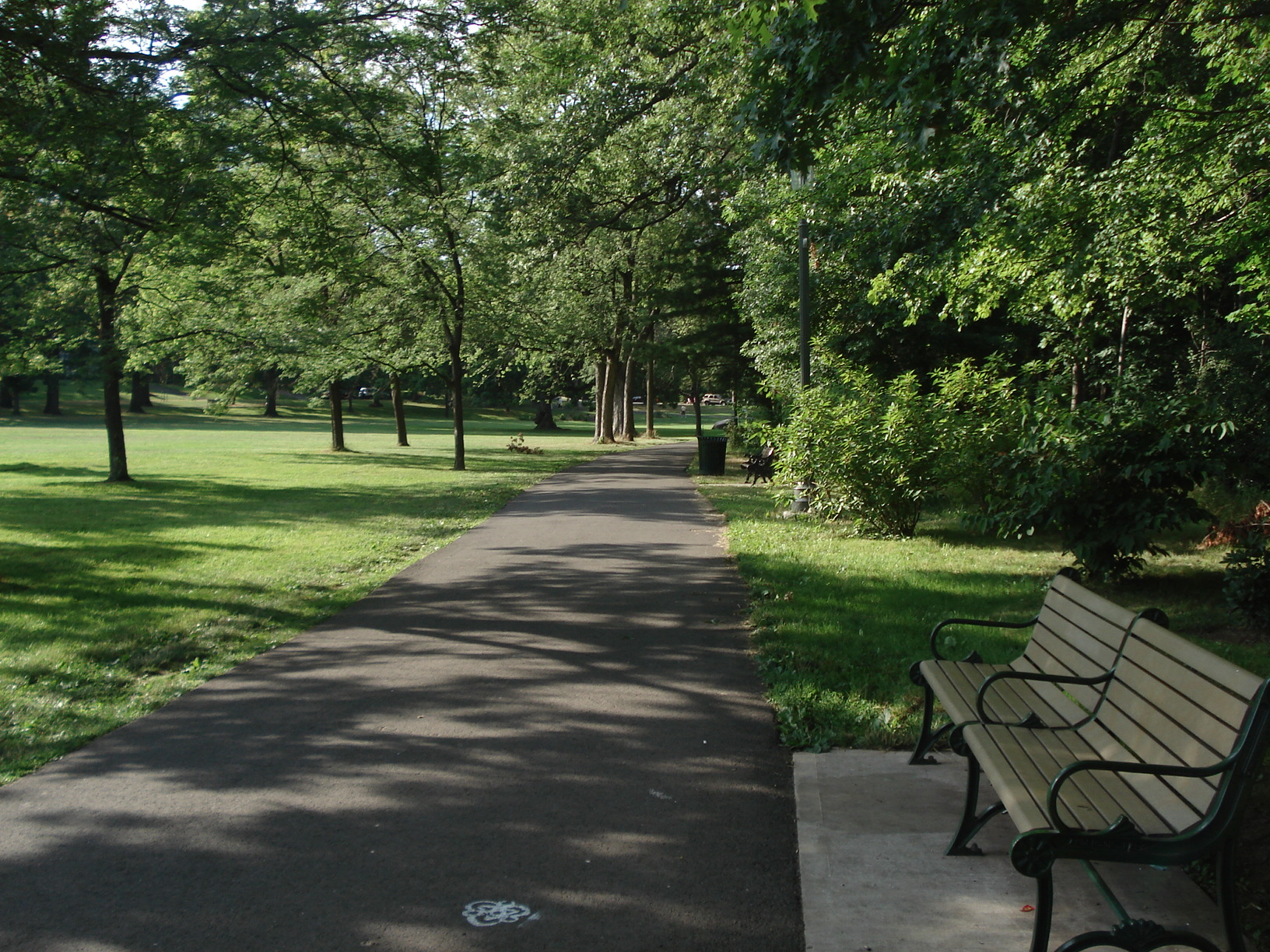
Path running through the park

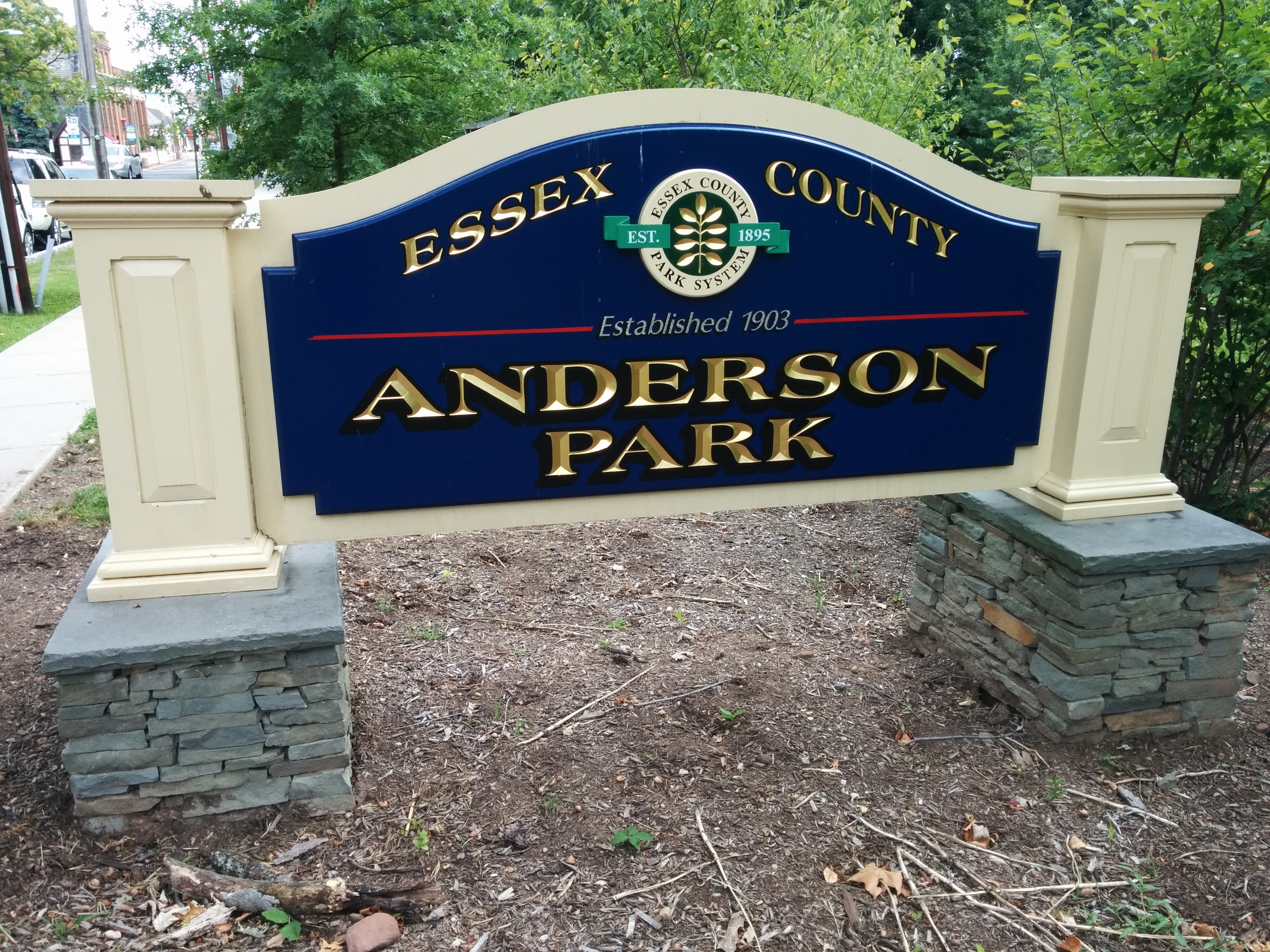
Anderson Park, Signage (as seen from Bellevue Avenue)

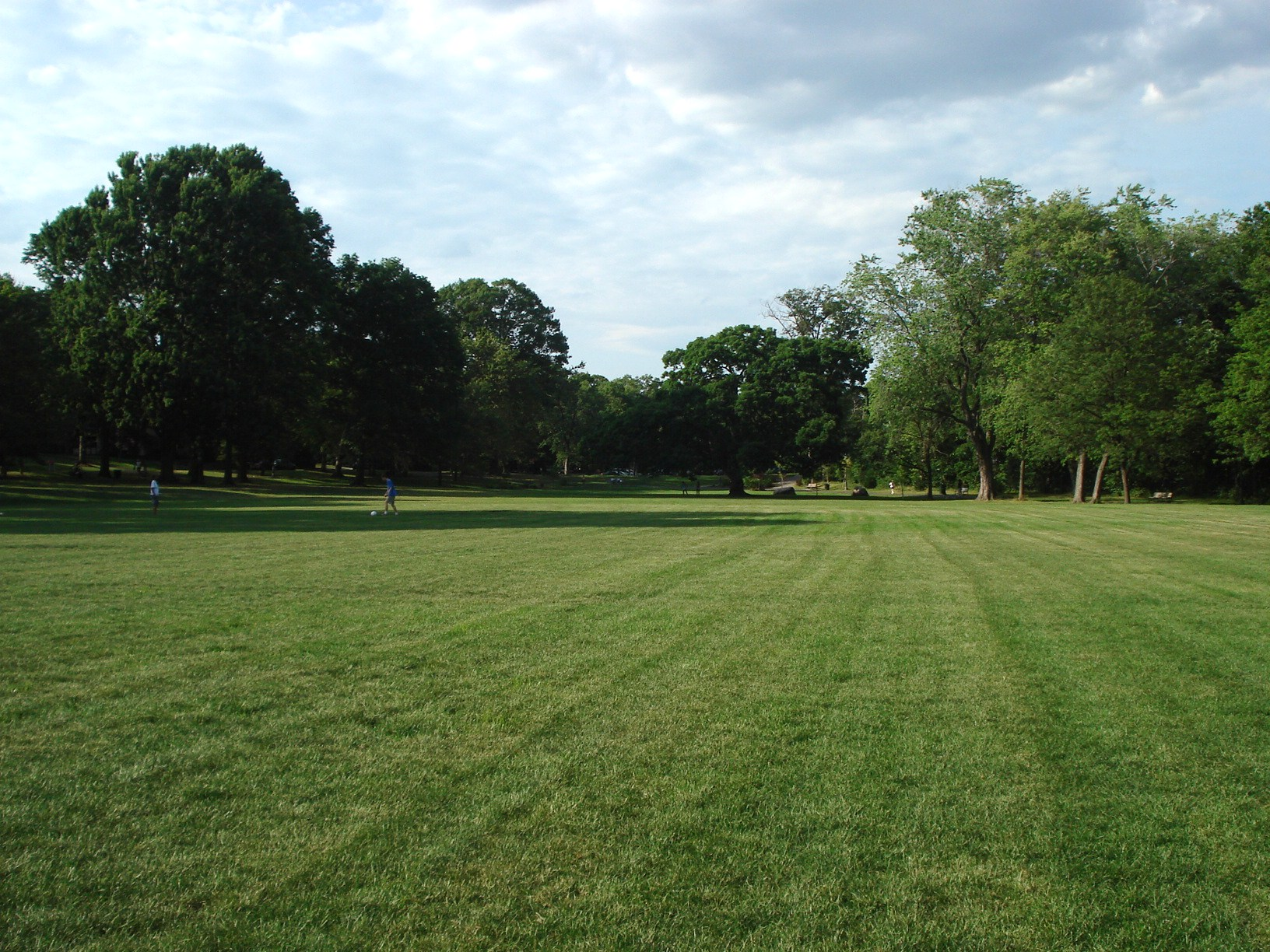
The lawn, Anderson Park, (2006)

== See also ==
- National Register of Historic Places listings in Essex County, New Jersey
