= Montclair Heights station =

NJ Transit rail station

Montclair Heights
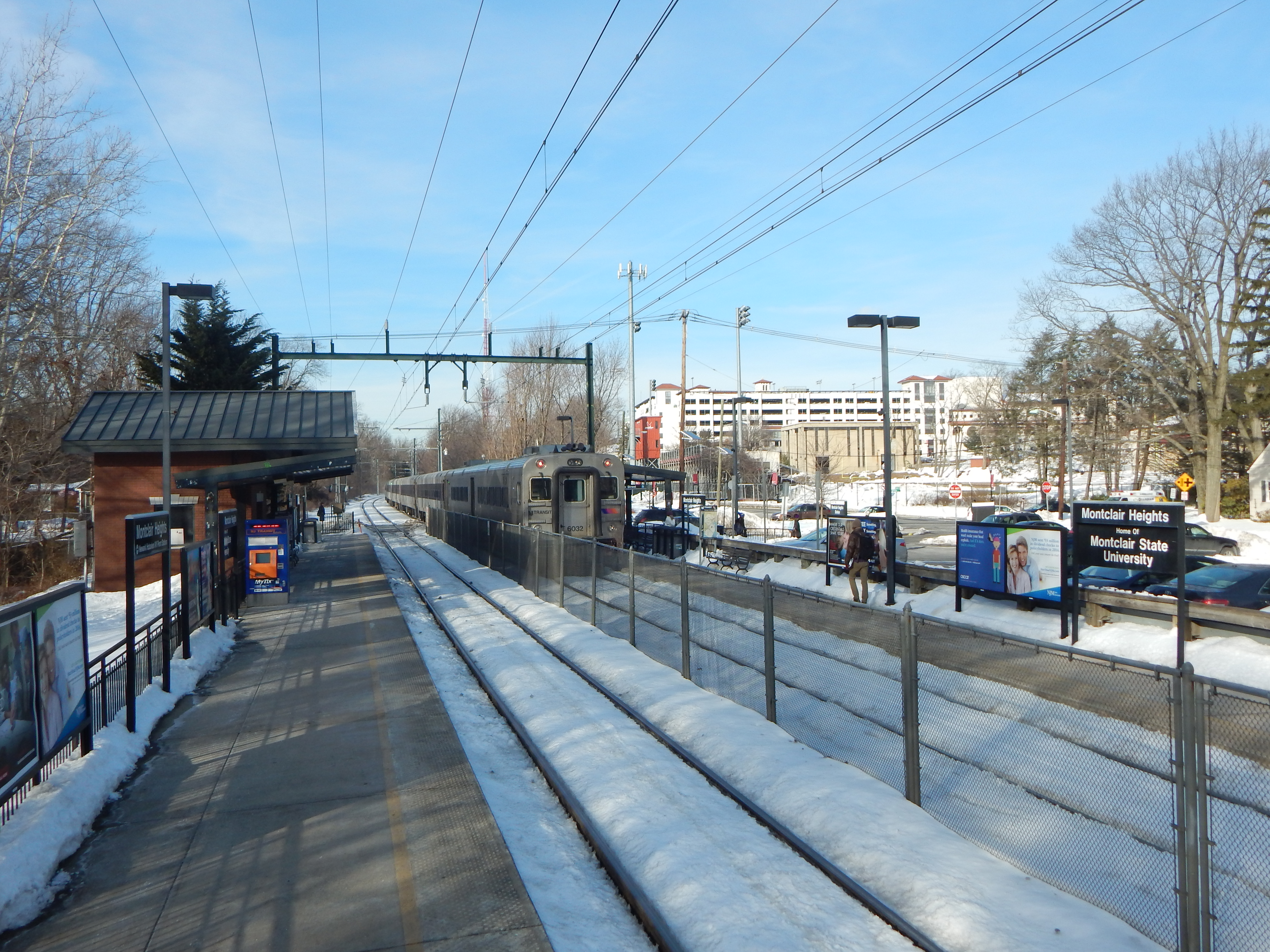
- A westbound train departs Montclair Heights station in February 2015. The campus of Montclair State University is visible on the right side.

General information
- Coordinates: 40.8576°N 74.2026°W
- Owner: New Jersey Transit
- Platforms: 2 low level side platforms with mini-high sections
- Tracks: 2
- Connections: NJT Bus: 28, 191, and 705

Construction
- Parking: 67 spots
- Cycle facilities: parking racks
- Accessible: yes

Other information
- Station code: 1745 (Erie Railroad)
- Fare zone: 6

History
- Opened: c. 1874
- Rebuilt: 1905, 1971, 1982, 1997–1998
- Electrified: September 30, 2002

Key dates
- November 20, 1959: Station agency closed
- March 21, 1970: Depot caught fire

Passengers
- 2025: 350 (average weekday)
- Rank: 78 of 153

Services
Preceding station	NJ Transit	Following station
Montclair State University toward Hackettstown	Montclair–Boonton Line weekdays	Mountain Avenue toward New York or Hoboken
Former services
Preceding station	Erie Railroad	Following station
Great Notch toward Sterling Forest	New York and Greenwood Lake Railway	Mountain Avenue toward Jersey City
Location

Montclair Heights (also signed as Montclair Heights–Home Of Montclair State University) is a New Jersey Transit station in the Montclair Heights area of Montclair Township, New Jersey. Located along the Montclair–Boonton Line at the Normal Avenue (CR 618) grade crossing, the station serves trains coming from six different terminals (two eastbound: New York Penn Station and Hoboken Terminal and four westbound: Montclair State University, Dover, Lake Hopatcong and Hackettstown stations). Depending on the direction of travel, Montclair Heights is either the first or last of six stations in the township. The next station westbound is Montclair State University, which is in Little Falls, while the next station eastbound is Upper Mountain Avenue.

The station consists of two low-level platforms with mini-high-level platforms at the southern end of both platforms. There are two ticket vending machines and 67 parking spaces available in lot along the westbound platform. The station primarily serves students of Montclair State University, which sits to the northeast of the platforms and has been owned by the township since 1983.

Montclair Heights station opened c. 1874 with the construction of the Montclair Railway, the predecessor to the New York and Greenwood Lake Railway. The station was replaced by the Erie Railroad in 1905 and moved to the Normal Avenue grade crossing from its previous home at Mount Hebron Road. The station depot lasted until it burned down on March 21, 1970, in a suspicious fire. A station shelter replaced that structure in April 1971 after the fire. That structure was replaced in 1982 by another station shelter. The current station was built in 1998.

Prior to the construction of the Montclair State University station, Montclair Heights was used as a transfer station for trains heading west towards Dover and Hackettstown on the Montclair–Boonton Line. The reason for this was that all trains going to points north of the station were required to be diesel-powered, while trains going to New York Penn Station are all electric because diesel trains are not allowed to use the North River Tunnels under the Hudson River.

== Station layout and service ==
Montclair Heights station is a two-platform station located on Normal Avenue in the township of Montclair. A shelter is available on the inbound platform, while only a canopy is only available to commuters. On the outbound side is a parking lot owned by the township. This lot has only 67 spaces, four of which are handicap accessible as part of the Americans With Disabilities Act of 1990. Fares of $5 per day and $300 permits per month are collected from Monday–Saturday.

There are two ticket vending machines on the inbound platform, which also has mini high-level platforms to service handicapped persons.

=== Service ===
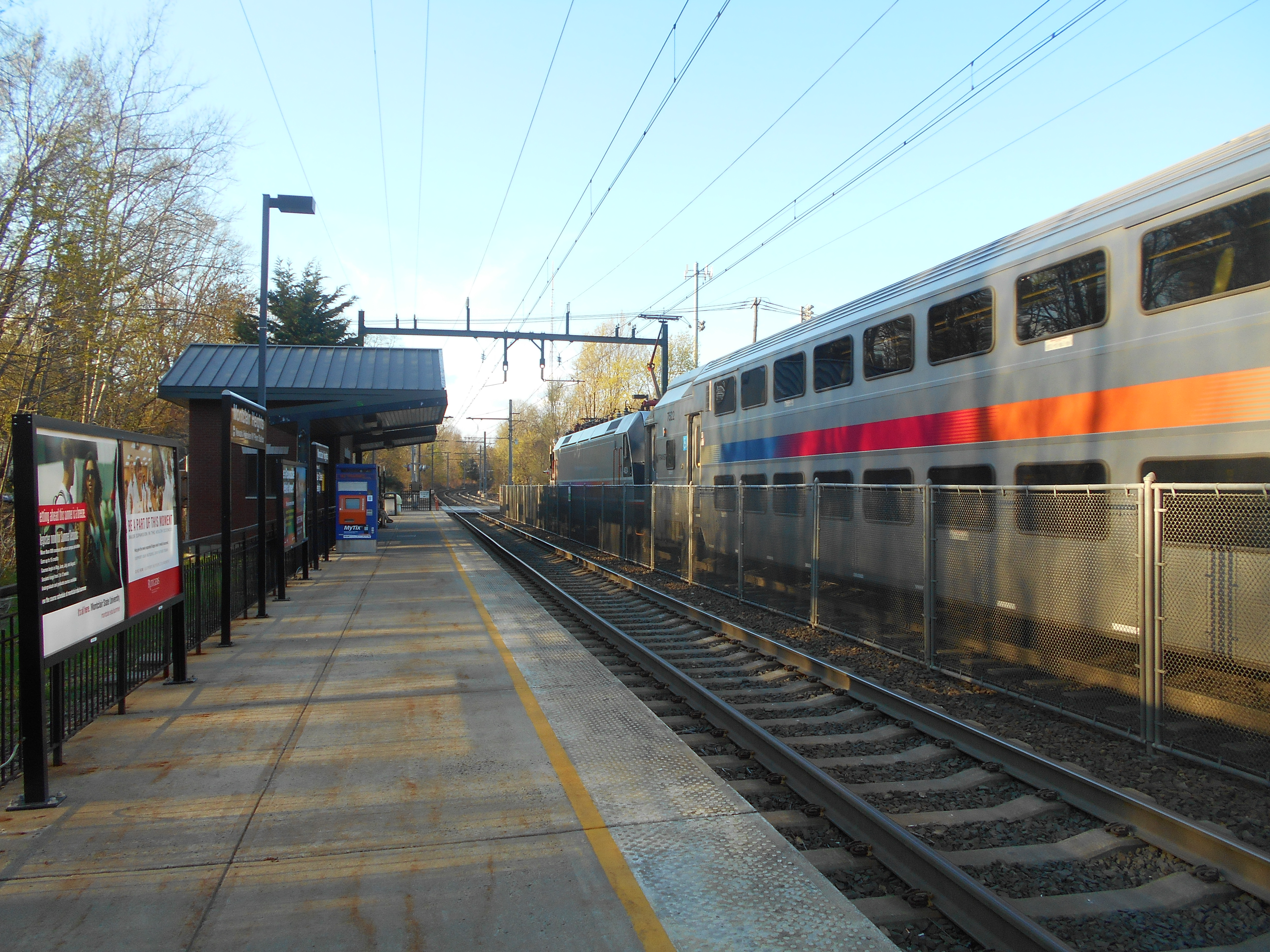
A train departs Montclair Heights station in May 2014

Montclair Heights station services trains on the Montclair–Boonton Line, with services to New York City's Penn Station and Hoboken Terminal to the east. To the west, trains depart for nearby Montclair State University, Dover, Hackettstown, and Lake Hopatcong stations.

The first train inbound on weekday arrives at 5:14 am from nearby Montclair State University station towards Penn Station. The first train to Hoboken arrives at 6:36 am weekdays. The last inbound station arrives at 11:17 pm, arriving at Hoboken Terminal. The first outbound train arrives at 6:27 am on weekdays, headed for Montclair State University. The first outbound train for Dover is at 2:43 pm; the first to Hackettstown arrives at 5:15 pm. The final train outbound is at 1:20 am the next morning. With the exception of holidays, there is no service to Montclair Heights on weekends.

=== Bus connections ===
While not directly served by any bus routes, connections can be made from the station by walking one block to nearby bus stops at Montclair State University or Valley Road. New Jersey Transit's 28 (to Newark Penn Station and Willowbrook Mall), 191 (to Port Authority Bus Terminal and Willowbrook), and 705 (to Passaic and Willowbrook) buses as well as DeCamp's 66 bus to New York City all stop near the station. A Montclair State University shuttle service, Route A, stops at Montclair Heights station seven days a week.

== History ==
=== Opening ===
Railroad service through Montclair Heights opened on January 1, 1873, with the opening of the Montclair Railway. This line was built as part of the New York and Oswego Railway, beginning in Jersey City and proceeding through Hudson, Essex, Passaic and Morris County for 40 miles (64 km). At Pompton Plains, connection was available to the main line of the New York and Oswego. This railroad was sold in the late 1870s to the New York, Lake Erie and Western Railroad, which changed the name to the New York and Greenwood Lake Railway.

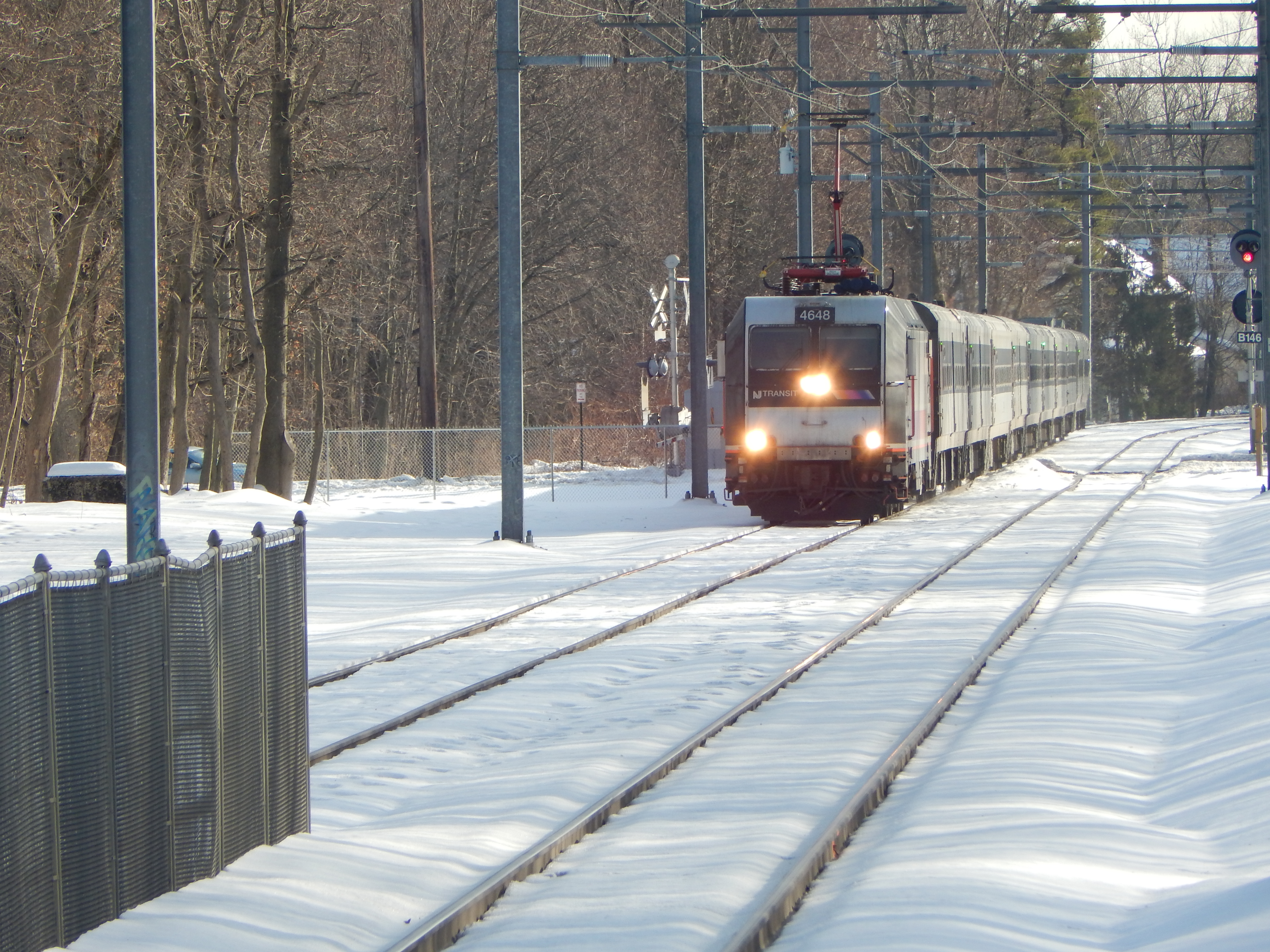
A New Jersey Transit train passes the former site of the Montclair Heights station from c. 1874–1905

The original station at Montclair Heights was built closer to modern-day Mount Hebron Road on land owned by the North Jersey Land Company by 1874. The fifth and final station going northbound in Montclair, the stop was at the location Mount Hebron and Carlisle Roads. The line was doubled-tracked through Montclair Heights in 1897. The station remained at this location until a new depot was built further north at Fifth Avenue (modern-day Normal Avenue) in 1905. The new depot was an Erie Type V irregular depot, with a wooden frame and a slate roof that overhung the structure. This station was measured at 40 by 25 feet (12.2 m × 7.6 m), attached with a former passenger car body, serving as a freighthouse. The former station depot, built in 1873–1874, was razed for a couple sidings and a watchmen's structure at the crossing.

In a strange outbreak, several hundred horses in the area were exposed to the glanders, an infectious disease, at Montclair Heights station itself in July 1905. Glanders was also reported at nearby Great Notch station along with the nearby Cedar Grove Reservoir. As a result of the outbreak of glanders, local veterinarians had to euthanize seven horses immediately while quarantining hundreds more.

=== Normal School opening ===
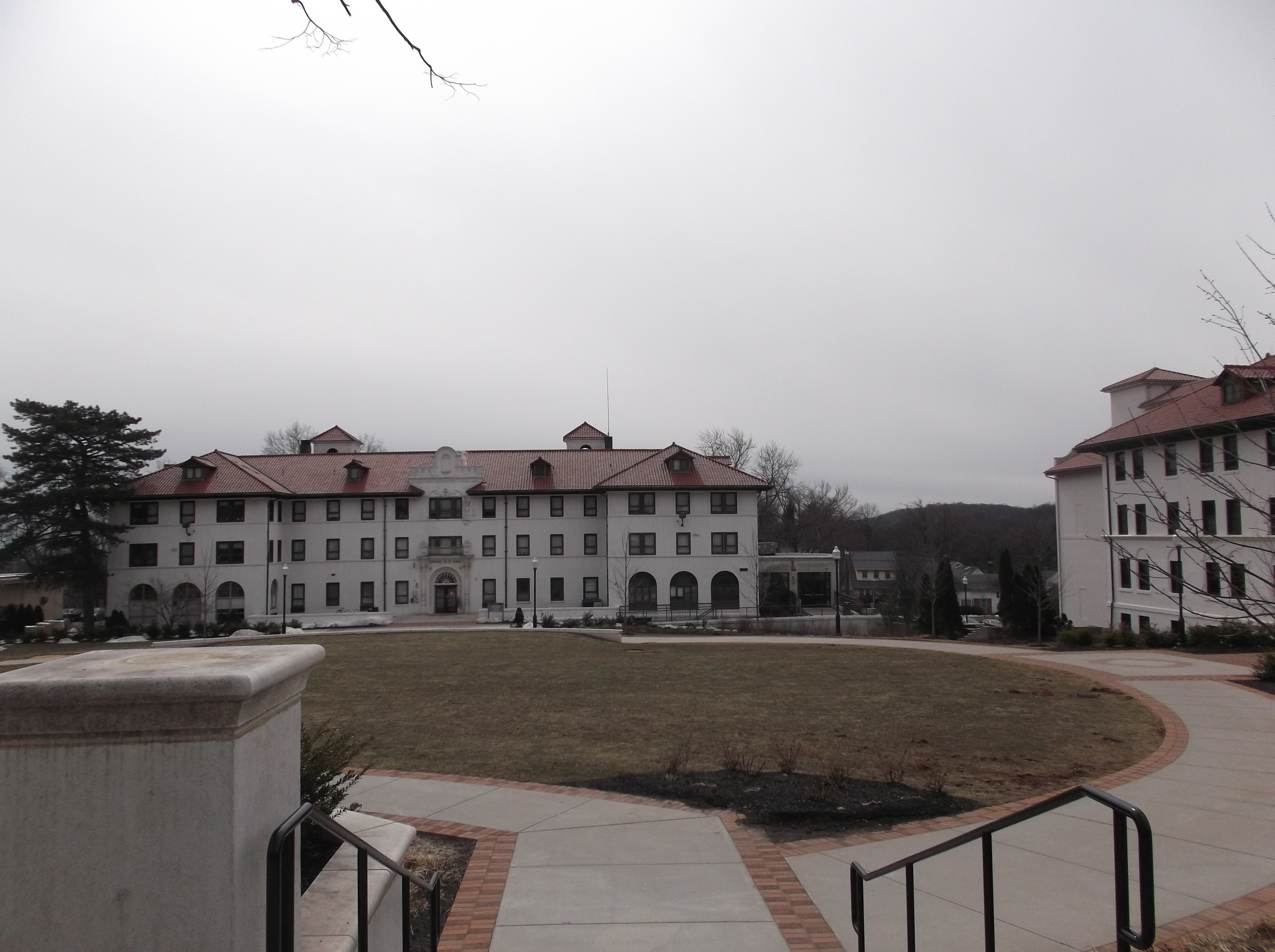
The original buildings of the Montclair State Normal School, now Montclair State University

A fight broke out between the Erie Railroad and the state of New Jersey in June 1907 with the planned construction of a new normal school in the Montclair Heights section. Fred Kilgus, the contractor in charge of building the new school, was displeased that the Erie Railroad backed out on its deal for a railroad siding at Montclair Heights station. This new siding would start at Montclair Heights station and go into the rear end of the campus for construction of the new school. With groundbreaking occurring on March 8, 1907, Kilgus noted that it would cost at least $3,000 (1907 USD) to haul material himself from the station. A new siding would be cheaper for Kilgus and his crew. An agreement had been made, but no contract was ever drawn up on the 1,400-foot (430 m) 3 percent grade spur. The railroad made a deal to build the siding, but required the payment. However, talks ceased and eventually the Erie Railroad declined to build a spur for construction.

On September 15, 1908, the Montclair State Normal School opened on the hills above Montclair Heights station. As part of opening the school, Principal Charles S. Chapin struck a deal with the Erie Railroad to add Montclair Heights stops to three trains for students. The 8:50 am and 10:30 am eastbound trains along with the 8:13 pm westbound train would stop at the station for the use of students at reasonable hours. State officials in charge of education in New Jersey expected that trains would bring students from nearby Paterson resulting in special service between Little Falls and Montclair Heights for students. This involved a trolley that made a 25-minute ride. The stretch between Little Falls and Montclair Heights was about ten minutes.

=== 1925–1926 consolidation proposal ===
In early 1926, the municipality looked at the possibility of building a new business zone in the northwest section of Montclair. This new business district would involve the areas around Montclair Heights and nearby Mountain Avenue station. This new business district would be built in the area around Carlisle Road. This was after the committee in charge declined building it along Mount Hebron Road or Normal Avenue. A two-block stretch of Carlisle Road would be involved in this new business zone. This proposal included building a new roadway on the western side of the tracks between Mount Hebron and Normal.

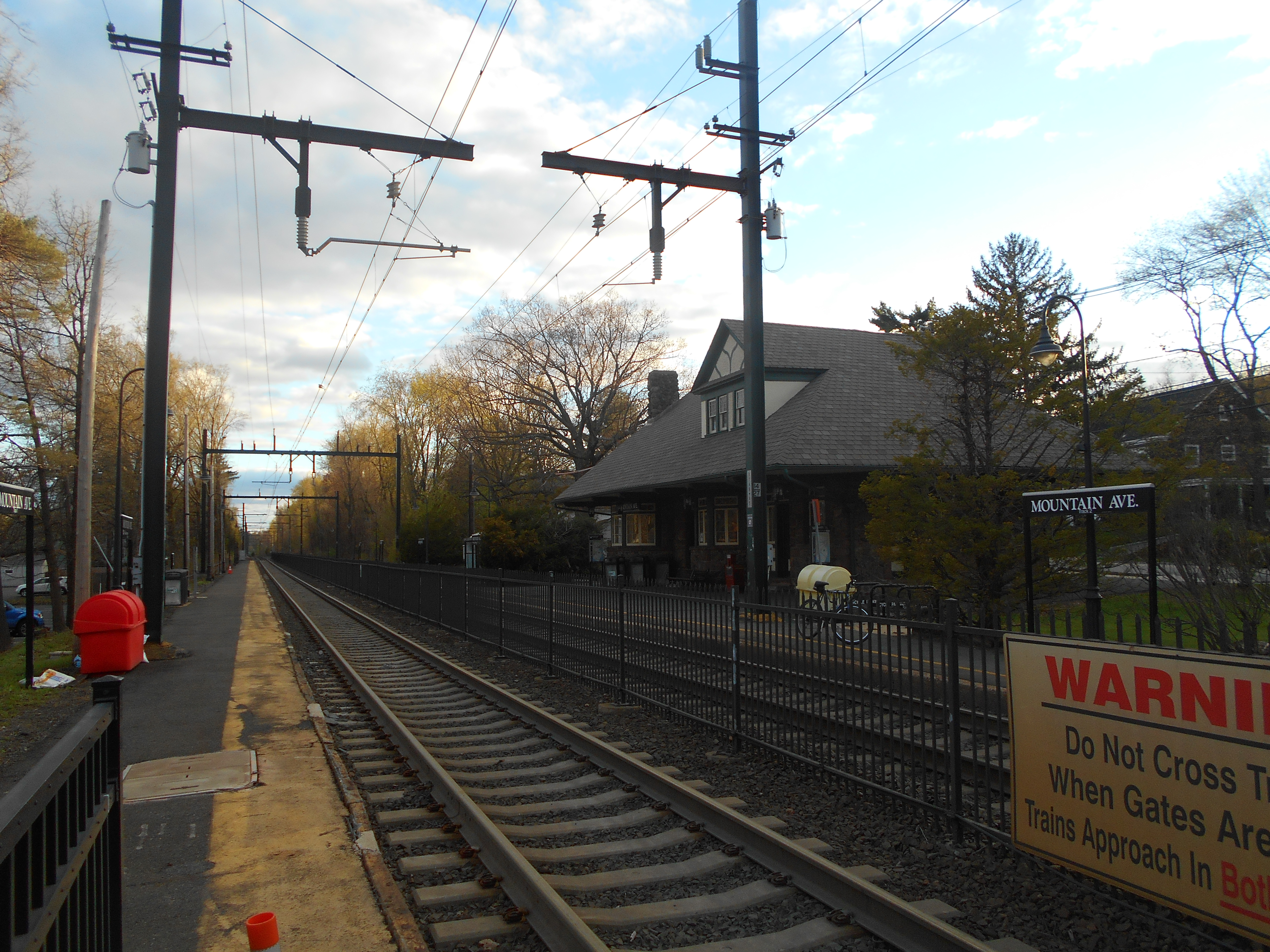
Mountain Avenue station, the other station that would be consolidated

The next proposal included a recommendation of building a new station at Mount Hebron Road to consolidate the Mountain Avenue and Montclair Heights stations. Unlike the former station, this one would be located on the southern end of the road crossing at Mount Hebron. Unlike Montclair Heights station, which lacked a platform in the inbound direction, this new station would have two platforms, serving about 250 commuters daily. The committee argued that the existence of both stations inhibited the development around the Mountain Avenue station, which was in the way of traffic on Upper Mountain Avenue. With Montclair Heights, the lack of a platform on the western side of the tracks inhibited residential development. This was also being exacerbated by the existence of the Normal School and the hills overlooking the station. The new station would open development with less restrictions.

Opposition was immediate. One resident wrote into The Montclair Times that the new business zone was a mask to keep businesses off Laurel Place and Valley Road. The resident argued that closing the Mountain Avenue station would not result in the commuters using the new station. Those commuters, about 250, would walk down to the Upper Montclair station. The ~100 commuters who use Montclair Heights would move to the new station, defeating the 350 proposal offered by the committee.

The closing of both stations would result in the decrease of property values around the area. The resident argued that property values with a station were much higher and that moving a station a half-mile away would make them drop due to lack of convenience. The writer, who got signatures after a 1925 proposal to do the same thing, noted that it would require locals to walk 15 minutes 300 times a year to the other stations. Thomas Topping, the author of 22 Glenwood Road, would note that the group involved in the protest would continue to fight.

=== Freedom Train stop ===
During 1948, the American Heritage Foundation sponsored a "Freedom Train" to circumnavigate the United States of America. The train was a moving museum that would help the "Year of Rededication". This rededication would be part of American ideals that they wanted to restore. In January 1948, after Montclair found out they would not be a stop on the Freedom Train, they brought a bus and filled it with various documents about the fanding of Montclair. The bus, dedicated as "Montclair's Freedom Truck," came in late-January 1948, making national headlines. The American Heritage Foundation also requested towns to send reports about what they did to see if it would help reconsider their decision to not stop there.

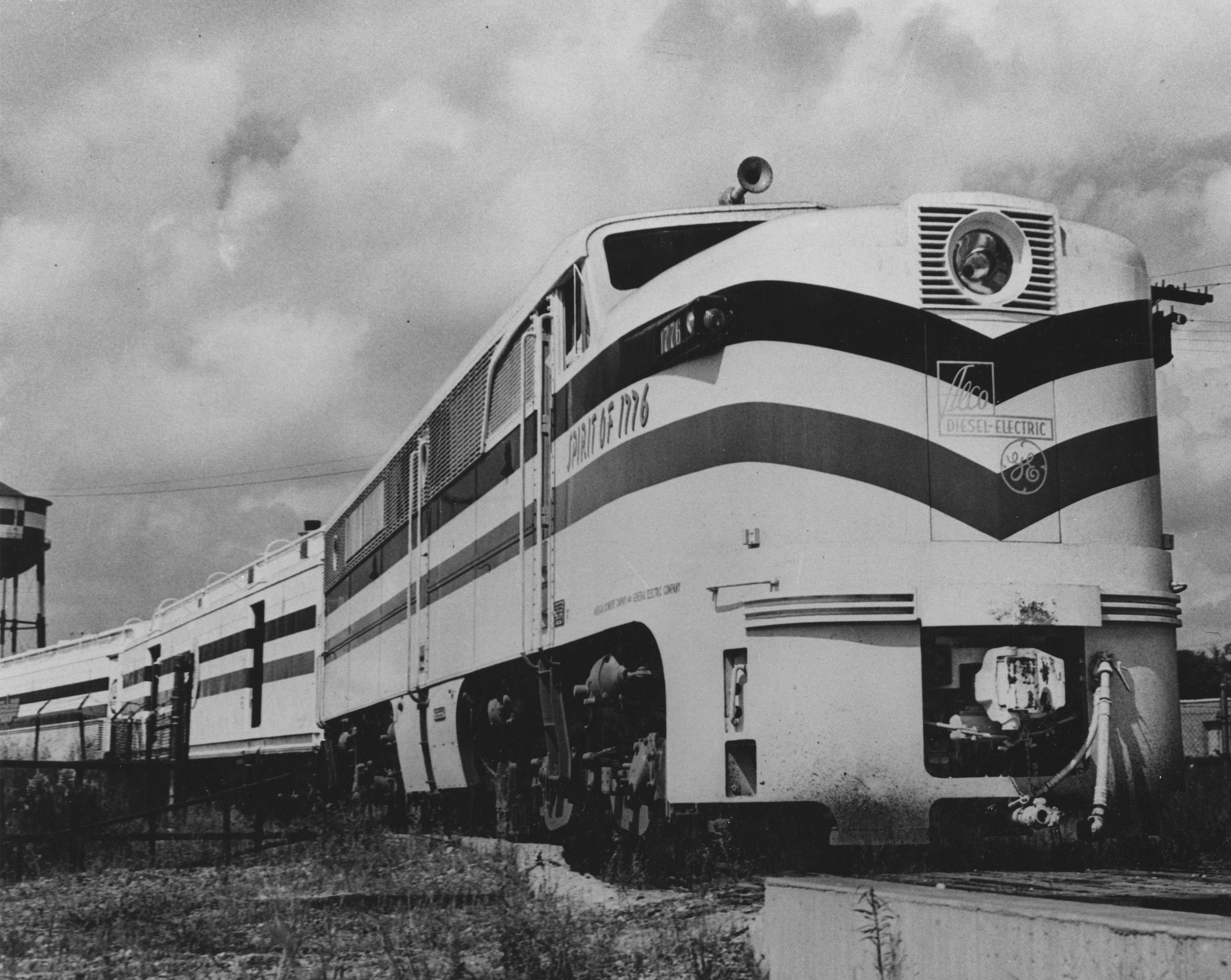
The Freedom Train that would arrive at Montclair on October 21, 1948

On September 29, 1948, it was announced that the Freedom Train would arrive at Montclair on Thursday, October 21, at Montclair Heights station from 9 am–10 pm. The town of Montclair appointed a committee to help with the ceremonies and events. By this time, the Freedom Train had stopped in 280 municipalities and seen by 2.7 million people. Mayor Howard N. Deyo of Montclair made a proclamation declaring the week of October 21 to be a week known as "Montclair Rededication Week" with the same ideologies as the national program. His proclamation urged citizens to help participate in events leading up to and during the week and welcomed the train to Montclair. The Wellmont Theatre also had the Freedom Train announcement on their marquee.

On October 21, 1948, the Freedom Train arrived at 1:45 am with seven cars. Crowd expectations were as high as 20,000, with students from Montclair High and four local middle schools. The students were released at 12:30 pm so they could visit the educational exhibits. Mayor Deyo opened the ceremonies at 8:45 am, with the public allowed in at 10 am. As part of Deyo's ceremonies, a local reverend, troops from the Boy Scouts of America and Girl Scouts of the USA, and 600 ticket holders got early access.

At the time of arriving in Montclair, the train had been on 34,688 miles across 48 states, including 308 of the planned cities. In all, 8,650 came to visit the Freedom Train at Montclair Heights station (well below the expected 20,000). The 8,650 attendees saw the Declaration of Independence, the Bill of Rights, various drafts of the Emancipation Proclamation and other historical documents through World War II. The train was then to head to Washington D.C. for repairs before a final run in Gettysburg, Pennsylvania then New York City.

=== Station agency discontinuance ===
In May 1959, another station consolidation debate came upon Montclair Heights and Mountain Avenue stations. This time, the Erie Railroad wanted to close Mountain Avenue station in favor of the Montclair Heights and Upper Montclair stations. The Erie Railroad scheduled a meeting on May 18, 1959, in Newark. The Erie not only wanted to abandon the agency and the station stops at Mountain Avenue. With the discontinuance of the station, the Erie would save $6,000 a year (1959 USD).

In August, the Erie Railroad also chose to file for abandoning the station agent at Montclair Heights. However, unlike Mountain Avenue, the railroad intended to keep stopping trains at Montclair Heights. Protest between May and August caused the Erie to back off on discontinuing service to Mountain Avenue. A problem with removing the agent at Montclair Heights was that by this time, the station depot was doubling as the Montclair Heights Post Office, a substation of the main one. At this time, the proposal from the Erie Railroad would be to have the depot open from 7–9 am for commuter use, as agreed to with Mountain Avenue earlier in the year.

The proposal to remove the station agent at Montclair Heights drew opposition. At a September 23, 1959 meeting of the Public Utility Commissioners, Montclair State College President E. DeAlton Partridge noted that it would be a "disservice to the students" who attended the school. Partridge himself admitted that only 25 percent of the student body used rail service to attend Montclair State, they were continuing to push railroad use due to limited parking options. They also tried unsuccessfully to get special student tickets and extra trains for students during the afternoon.

However, a representative from the United States Postal Service noted that they had no opinion of what the Erie would do with the Montclair Heights depot. Despite that, the federal government would have to move or eliminate their substation at Montclair Heights. Dr. Partridge also disagreed with that as much of Montclair State's mail came through the Montclair Heights substation. At that time, it was also revealed that the Postal Service was considering moving the substation to the campus itself.

However, after a two-hour deliberation on September 12, 1959, the Public Utility Commissioners reserved judgement on what to do in the Montclair Heights agent removal. Dean of Montclair State Leo Fuchs appeared at the meeting to testify on behalf of students against the railroad noting that 25 of the 2,130 students use the facility. The town of Montclair also sent a representative, that one being Samuel Allcorn, Jr., the local Counsel.

In early November, the Commissioners sided with the Erie Railroad and approved the removal of the station agent. They set a date of November 21 for the discontinuing of the agent. With the decision, Postmaster Richard F. McMahon announced that they would close the substation on November 20 and not replace the facility in the area. This deal came about by a deal made between the Erie and Allcorn. On November 20, officials from the Erie Railroad climbed the semaphore signal across the tracks from the depot and removed it, signaling the discontinuance of the agency.

=== 1970 fire and replacement ===
On September 17, 1968, the town of Montclair sent a letter to the Erie Lackawanna Railroad that any station depots in poor condition were to be demolished as soon as possible. In March 1969, the Erie Lackawanna responded that the only station of the five they served in Montclair that could be razed is Montclair Heights. According to The Montclair Times, there had been complaints for several years about the deteriorating condition of the depot on Normal Avenue. The station had been boarded up in the windows and the doors locked. The town of Montclair wanted the depot replaced with waiting shelters for commuters. The Health and Building Departments agreed with the new design of a new shelter for Montclair Heights.

However, on October 29, 1969, the Montclair Health Department filed an official complaint and violation against the Erie Lackawanna for their lack of maintenance at the Montclair Heights station. The railroad would need to, as agreed to by their lawyer, seal the cellar staircase and take care of a rat infestation around and in the depot. The lawyer for the railroad, Vincent McGowan, noted this could be done in a week. However, the town of Montclair gave the railroad through January 15, 1970 to correct the problems.

At the same time, McGowan notified the town that Montclair State College and the Erie Lackawanna were in talks to lease the station. McGowan stated that a lease or demolition of the depot would take care of the unsanitary conditions.

On February 2, 1970, the complaint against the Erie Lackawanna was dismissed by the Montclair Municipal Court Judge Frank Brunetto, Jr. Johseph C. Dickson, Jr., the Assistant Town Counsel, noted that the railroad took care of the rodent outbreak. This control program was run by the railroad and the Montclair Health Department, with the station being re-sealed. Montclair State also signed a lease for $1 per year to use the depot. They would then renovate the depot and put it to use. Dickson noted that the town wants to maintain the depot and the surrounding area, which would also include asking Public Service Coordinated Transport and Trackless Transit, two local bus companies to move their buses elsewhere while idling.

However, the decisions by Montclair State would end when a fire broke out at the Montclair Heights station depot on March 21, 1970. Around 3:44 am that morning, firemen were notified about the fire by residents who heard a loud explosion prior to the blase. The station depot burned for 3.5 hours with ten firefighters handling the braze with 2 trucks. Inside the depot were $3,000 of equipment (300 chairs) for use in the newly constructed Partridge Hall. These chairs were to be moved in April when the building opened. The destroyed depot was a complete loss and the railroad would demolish it once the insurance claim went through.

The Erie Lackawanna applied in November 1970 to have the Montclair Heights station lack any facilities completely rather than build a new depot or shelter on the location. This appeal would be heard on December 15 in Newark with the Public Utility Commissioners.

However, it was at a second meeting on January 14, 1971, when the railroad along with the town of Montclair both sent representatives to the Commissioners. After the fire and the demolition of the shell in May 1970, there were no facilities for commuters to use in order to keep them out of the weather. The railroad reported that 150 commuters used the station daily in a November count. The railroad's attorney, Henry Wilewski, noted that the New Jersey Department of Transportation would help fund the cost of a new shelter at Montclair Heights, which was the request of the town. However, the Commissioners chose to not make a verdict at that time.

In March 1971, almost a year after the fire, the Erie Lackawanna was ordered by the Commissioners to build a new station shelter suitable for commuters at Montclair Heights. The railroad, which would save $300 a year over a depot, was required to put up a shelter for public necessity by April 8, 1971.

=== Leasing problems ===
In 1981, the township of Montclair was informed that as of July 1, any remaining agencies would be removed except for Watchung Avenue station. This included the agents at Upper Montclair and Erie Plaza/Montclair station. New Jersey Transit, now operating stations on the Boonton Line, would only open and close the stations along with maintain and insuring them. They also offered a second proposal in which the township of Montclair would take over maintenance of all six stations, including Montclair Heights. Montclair responded and offered to lease the stations into their control. By June, the negotiations began. New Jersey Transit also renovated the stations in Montclair as part of the project. By this time, Montclair Heights was nothing more than a station shelter for commuters.

However, on July 20, 1982, the Mayor of Montclair, Mary Mochary, noted that the lease agreement was on hold until New Jersey Transit rectified drainage problems at Montclair Heights station. Locals noticed that the crew working at Montclair Heights were going to put down fresh topsoil to work on drainage and put fresh grass and shrubs on top of those. However, there were questions if that would solve the problem. Peter Steck, the local official in charge of Planning and Community Development, noted that the drainage would go into the storm sewer and that the station resurfacing work would be finished on July 29.

On February 1, 1983, New Jersey Transit and Montclair Township officials met at the Upper Montclair station and agreed to a lease for all six stations along the line. Under the 10-year deal, Montclair would take over the operation and maintenance of station facilities and parking services (including the lots). Montclair Heights also gained a new shelter in the construction leading up to the lease, as part of spending $800,000 on all six stations.

=== New station and Montclair Connection ===
New Jersey Transit approved the construction of a new station at Montclair Heights in February 1997. The improvements would include a new 220-foot (67 m) platform on the Hackettstown-bound tracks, boasting a 20-foot (6.1 m) canopy. A new platform would be built on the Newark-bound side, with a 200 square feet (19 m^{2}) waiting shelter. It would also have a 60-foot (18 m) canopy. The platforms would primarily be low-level except for a pair of mini-high level platforms. The station would also get improved lighting. The total cost would be $882,741 (1997 USD). Construction of the current station finished in 1998.

On August 13, 1999, construction began on the Montclair Connection, a track project that would connect the Boonton Line and Montclair Branch at Bay Street, along with electrifying the line up to Great Notch station. The project would allow direct service from Montclair Heights station to New York Penn Station. In early September 2002, New Jersey Transit announced that as part of the changes, the line would receive five morning inbound trains to New York, three evening outbound trains; three morning trains to Hoboken Terminal. Two evening peak trains would operate only between Hoboken and Montclair Heights but off-peak service would be exclusively between Hoboken and Montclair Heights. This new service began on the line on September 30, 2002.

Montclair Heights station served as the connection between the non-electrified section of the new Montclair-Boonton Line and the electrified section. Commuters would transfer at Montclair Heights to catch an electric train if coming from stations west. This would add to the commute of those going to Hoboken Terminal by at least ten minutes. In September 2002, construction began on a new station at Montclair State University in Little Falls. This new station would replace Montclair Heights as the transfer point for diesel to electrification transfers. On April 28, 2003, the transfer point was changed from Montclair Heights to a platform at the unfinished Montclair State University station. As part of the changes, Montclair Heights saw service changes as well on several trains.

== Bibliography ==
- New Jersey State Legislature (1918). Documents of the ... Legislature of the State of New Jersey, Issue 2. Trenton, New Jersey: New Jersey State Legislature.
- Yanosey, Robert J. (2006). Erie Railroad Facilities (In Color). Vol. 1: New Jersey. Scotch Plains, New Jersey: Morning Sun Books Inc. ISBN 1-58248-183-0.
