= Great Notch, New Jersey =

Populated place in Passaic County, New Jersey, US

- Census-designated place
- Location in Passaic County Location in New Jersey Location in the United States
- Coordinates: 40°52′28″N 74°12′28″W
- Country: United States
- State: New Jersey
- County: Passaic
- Township: Little Falls

Area
  - Total: 1.01 sq mi (2.62 km^{2})
  - Land: 0.99 sq mi (2.57 km^{2})
  - Water: 0.019 sq mi (0.05 km^{2})
- Elevation: 312 ft (95 m)

Population (2020)
  - Total: 3,289
  - Density: 3,315.6/sq mi (1,280.16/km^{2})
- ZIP Code: 07424
- FIPS code: 34-27390
- GNIS feature ID: 0876752

Great Notch is an unincorporated community and census-designated place (CDP) located in eastern Little Falls, in Passaic County, in the U.S. state of New Jersey. As of the 2020 census, Great Notch had a population of 3,289. It gets its name from a gap in the first of the Watchung Mountains. Located in Great Notch are parts of Montclair State University and the Great Notch Fire Company.

== Demographics ==
Historical population
Census	Pop.	Note	%±
2020	3,289		—
U.S. Decennial Census; 2020

Great Notch was first listed as a census designated place in the 2020 U.S. census.

=== 2020 census ===
As of the 2020 census, Great Notch had a population of 3,289. The median age was 47.5 years. 15.4% of residents were under the age of 18 and 24.3% of residents were 65 years of age or older. For every 100 females there were 88.5 males, and for every 100 females age 18 and over there were 85.3 males age 18 and over.

100.0% of residents lived in urban areas, while 0.0% lived in rural areas.

There were 1,399 households in Great Notch, of which 23.4% had children under the age of 18 living in them. Of all households, 52.1% were married-couple households, 13.5% were households with a male householder and no spouse or partner present, and 29.6% were households with a female householder and no spouse or partner present. About 30.1% of all households were made up of individuals and 13.1% had someone living alone who was 65 years of age or older.

There were 1,481 housing units, of which 5.5% were vacant. The homeowner vacancy rate was 1.2% and the rental vacancy rate was 8.7%.

Great Notch CDP, New Jersey – Racial and ethnic composition Note: the US Census treats Hispanic/Latino as an ethnic category. This table excludes Latinos from the racial categories and assigns them to a separate category. Hispanics/Latinos may be of any race.
Race / Ethnicity (NH = Non-Hispanic)	Pop 2020	2020
White alone (NH)	2,596	78.93%
Black or African American alone (NH)	86	2.61%
Native American or Alaska Native alone (NH)	1	0.03%
Asian alone (NH)	171	5.20%
Native Hawaiian or Pacific Islander alone (NH)	0	0.00%
Other race alone (NH)	11	0.33%
Mixed race or Multiracial (NH)	61	1.85%
Hispanic or Latino (any race)	363	11.04%
Total	3,289	100.00%

== Transportation ==
With fewer than 10 passengers boarding per weekday, NJ Transit ended service at the Great Notch train station in January 2010.
