= Upper Montclair station =

NJ Transit rail station

Upper Montclair
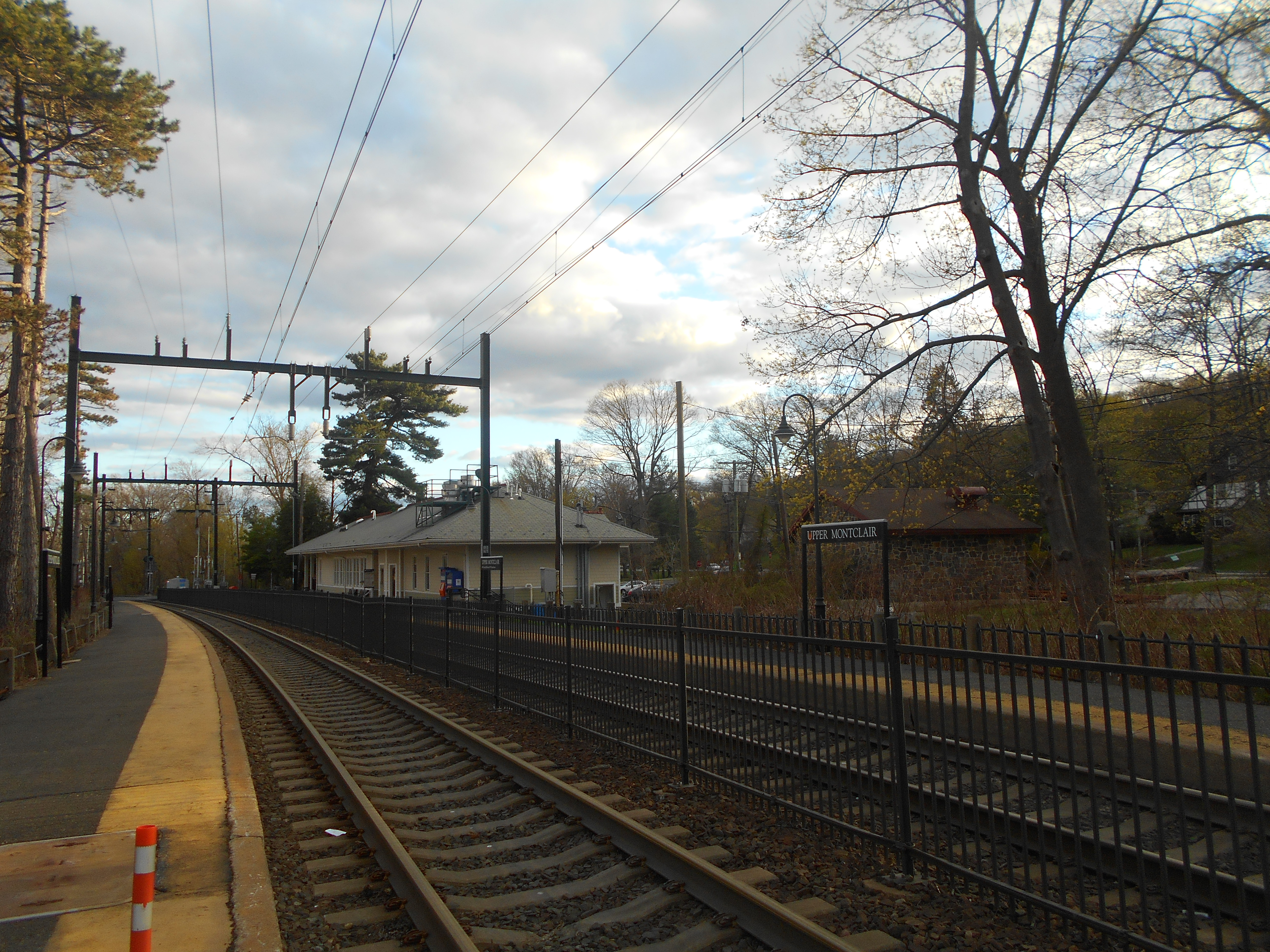
- Upper Montclair station in April 2014. The new station, rebuilt from the 2006 fire, is visible on the right side of the platforms.

General information
- Location: 275 Bellevue Avenue; Upper Montclair, New Jersey
- Owner: New Jersey Transit
- Platforms: 2 low level side platforms
- Tracks: 2
- Connections: NJT Bus: 28, 101

Construction
- Parking: 111 spots in 2 lots
- Cycle facilities: Parking racks
- Accessible: No

Other information
- Station code: 1741 (Erie Railroad)
- Fare zone: 5

History
- Opened: January 1, 1873
- Rebuilt: 1892, 2010
- Electrified: September 30, 2002

Key dates
- July 1, 1981: Station agency closed
- February 5, 2006: Depot caught fire

Passengers
- 2025: 487 (average weekday)
- Rank: 59 of 153

Services
Preceding station	NJ Transit	Following station
Mountain Avenue toward Hackettstown	Montclair–Boonton Line weekdays	Watchung Avenue toward New York or Hoboken
Former services
Preceding station	Erie Railroad	Following station
Mountain Avenue toward Sterling Forest	New York and Greenwood Lake Railway	Watchung Avenue toward Jersey City
- Upper Montclair Station
- U.S. National Register of Historic Places
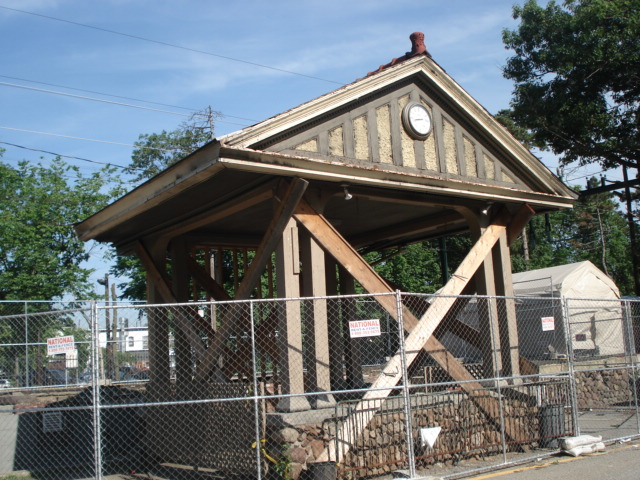
- The Porte Cochere of the station house, which burned down except this part
- Area: 0.5 acres (0.2 ha)
- Built: 1892
- Architect: Thomas C. Veale
- Architectural style: Renaissance
- MPS: Operating Passenger Railroad Stations TR
- NRHP reference No.: 84002673
- Added to NRHP: June 22, 1984
Location

Upper Montclair is a New Jersey Transit station in Upper Montclair, New Jersey, a census-designated place of Montclair, New Jersey. The station is part of the Montclair–Boonton Line. The station is located between two grade level crossings on Bellevue Avenue and Lorraine Avenue, and between North Mountain Avenue and Upper Montclair Plaza parallel to the railroad, and is within steps of the Upper Montclair Business District. The station is 13.7 miles (22.0 km) on the Boonton Line. Closing the grade crossing of Lorraine Avenue is being considered for safety reasons.

Upper Montclair is the fourth of six stops in Montclair the train makes coming northbound on the line, and the third as one comes southbound. It is 9 stations away from New York City, and 8 from Hoboken. A stream, Toney's Brook has its source just to the northwest of the station and separates the northbound platform from the parking lots on either side of the tracks. Across the street from the station is Anderson Park.

== Station facilities and services ==
The original station was a small building, built by the Montclair Railway when the Upper Montclair area was still rural. It was acquired by the Erie Railroad and rebuilt in 1892. In 2006, the 1892 station building was damaged in a fire, but the platform survived and was able to remain in service. In 2009 the station was rebuilt. The new building was designed to resemble the original design and incorporate the existing porte-cochere which had survived the fire, but will be larger. The building will have 18-foot-high vaulted ceilings and travertine marble floors. During reconstruction, a tent was used as a temporary shelter on the eastbound platform. On the westbound platform there was a shelter, but now it is gone except for its columns. A former freight house is across Lorraine Avenue from the station.

In 2010, the station was fully restored and as before the fire, houses a restaurant inside. According to the developer, initially the project was expected to cost $1 million, but in the end it came in closer to $2 million.

The side platforms, which are at ground level, are only long enough for 5 cars, allowing passengers to exit or board from not all cars. There are 111 commuter parking spots, which are let out by permits. The rest of the parking lots are metered. There are bike racks for parking bikes.

== History ==
=== Construction ===
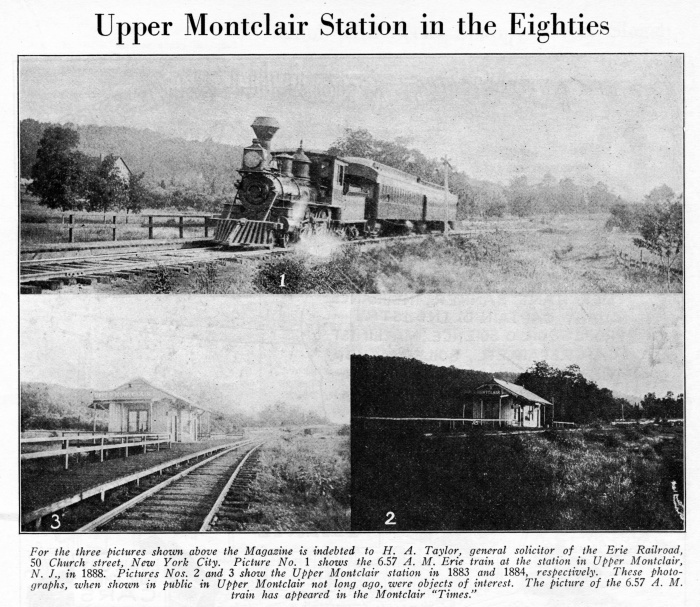
Upper Montclair Erie station in 1883, 1884 and 1888

The impetus for a brand new railway through Montclair was brought by the fact that the service to New York City was not to their liking. Local leaders, such as Julius Pratt, led the creation of the Montclair Railway to provide a rival service for the Morris & Essex Railroad, which also ran through Montclair. This new service, created in 1867, cost $4 million (1867 USD). However, the projection of ridership was only 2,000 and seemed comical at the idea of ever being constructed. Despite the dissent, the New York, Oswego and Midland Railroad Company helped finance the railway and it was completed in 1872, just before the Panic of 1873. This new service, however, was unable to show a profit until it became a part of the New York and Greenwood Lake Railway.

By 1884, four stations had been opened in Montclair: Montclair, Watchung, Upper Montclair and Montclair Heights. In 1892, a new depot was constructed at Upper Montclair, one story tall and made of wood with a fine, classical interior. In 1899, the depot was expanded to its main state, distinctively designed for the neighborhood. This included a Porte-cochere for drivers who would cross through a park. The depot was designed as being seven bays wide and two bays deep with a hipped gable roof. The depot's porte-cochere was grounded on wood columns that were supported in stone with limestone. The depot had eight windows and three doors running along the eastern facade of the depot, with six and one on the west as well as two windows on the southern side and a door with three windows on the northern side. This depot had a clapboard base and the walls, shingles and roofing was all made slate.

Internally, the Upper Montclair depot had one level and a basement, which involved a ticket office, waiting room on the south side of the depot and restrooms and the baggage room along the northern side. The original depot had an all-wood interior, but the floors were eventually replaced with concrete and the walls were painted.

=== Proposed removal from the National Register ===
The historic original station house has been listed in the state and federal registers of historic places since 1984 and is part of the Operating Passenger Railroad Stations Thematic Resource.

The first attempt to remove the Upper Montclair station from the National Register of Historic Places came several months after the fire on February 5, 2006. Due to the fire, most of the station was a total loss minus the porte-cochere and the terra cotta tile lining on the roof. In October, New Jersey Transit used this as an opportunity to request the declassification, but withdrew the offer to consult with local officials and other interested parties. In February 2007, two offers were laid on the table: to either demolish the site and re-develop it completely, or to rebuild the station using former Erie Railroad-styles wherever possible, such as the saved sections. The budget for a redo of the original depot was unavailable and by October 2007, it was decided that something similar to the original depot would be rebuilt instead.

The second attempt was done in January 2011, after completion of the new depot. The Montclair Historical Preservation Commission determined it would agree with the decision by February, but have it designated as a township landmark. A signed letter was drafted in September 2012 that they agreed with the decision of the Commission and that the depot was not rebuilt to the standards as requested.

On January 22, 2015, it was reported in the Montclair Times that New Jersey Transit had sent a notice to Montclair Township about requesting the removal of Upper Montclair station's historic status, based on the destruction of the original Erie Railroad depot in 2006. A councilman in the neighborhood, Bill Hurlock, protested to the paper that the businesses in the area around the station value and advertise about the structure. Locals as well as a group named Friends of Anderson Park, protested the fact the declassification from the New Jersey and National Registers of Historical Places could cause development in the Anderson Park and affect property values through the neighborhood.

On March 11, it was reported by the Montclair Times that New Jersey Transit once again withdrew its offer to the state of New Jersey to remove the Upper Montclair station from the listings. Residents, who had been preparing to protest the decision with various defenses, received defense from the Township Council and Essex County opposing this decision, contrary to the original attempts. Nia Gill, a state senator out of Essex County stated that losing the station's status would be a disservice to the township.

== Bibliography ==
- Baxter, Raymond J.; Adams, Arthur G. (1999). Railroad Ferries of the Hudson: And Stories of a Deckhand. Fordham, New York: Fordham University Press. ISBN 9780823219544.
- Catlin, George L. (1873). Homes on the Montclair Railway, for New York Business Men. A Description of the Country Adjacent to the Montclair Railway, Between Jersey City and Greenwood Lake. New York, New York: Montclair Railway Company.
- Nowicki, Susan A (2008). Montclair, New Jersey : the development of a suburban town and its architecture (PhD). City University of New York. OCLC 233535656.
- Shaw, William H. (1884). History of Essex and Hudson Counties, New Jersey. Vol. 2. Essex County, New Jersey: Everts & Peck.
- Whittemore, Henry (1894). History of Montclair Township, State of New Jersey: Including the History of Families who Have Been Identified with Its Growth and Prosperity. New York, New York: The Suburban Publishing Company.
