= Mountain Avenue station =

NJ Transit rail station

Mountain Ave.
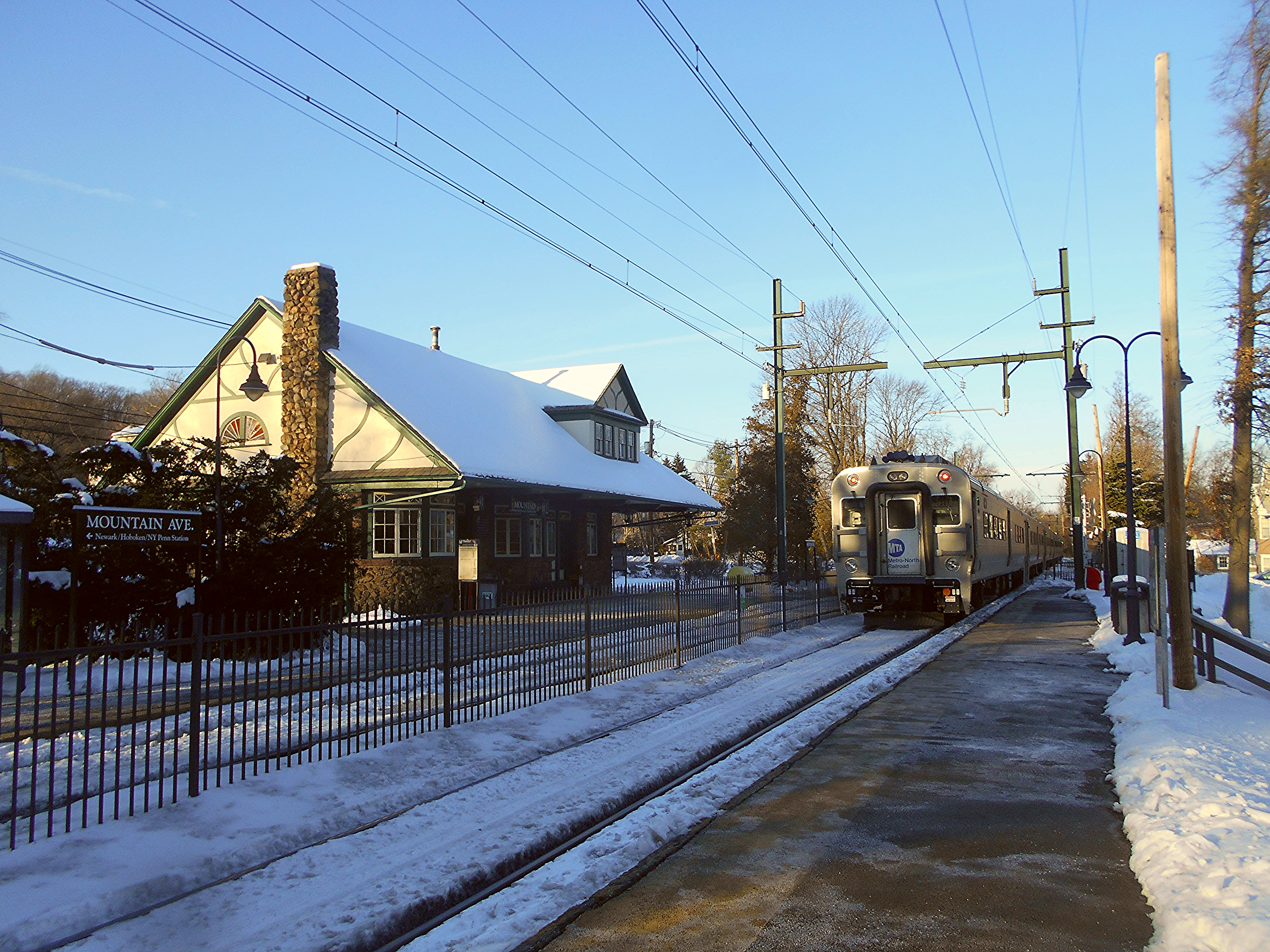
- An afternoon train leaving Mountain Avenue station in February 2015. The 1893 station depot, constructed by the Erie Railroad is on the left.

General information
- Location: 14 Laurel Place, Montclair, New Jersey
- Coordinates: 40.8488°N 74.2054°W
- Owner: New Jersey Transit
- Platforms: 2 low level side platforms
- Tracks: 2
- Connections: NJT Bus: 28, 101

Construction
- Parking: 23 spots
- Cycle facilities: parking racks

Other information
- Station code: 1743 (Erie Railroad)
- Fare zone: 6

History
- Opened: January 1, 1873
- Rebuilt: 1893
- Electrified: September 30, 2002

Key dates
- 1959: Station agency closed

Passengers
- 2025: 94 (average weekday)
- Rank: 120 of 153

Services
Preceding station	NJ Transit	Following station
Montclair Heights toward Hackettstown	Montclair–Boonton Line weekdays	Upper Montclair toward New York or Hoboken
Former services
Preceding station	Erie Railroad	Following station
Montclair Heights toward Sterling Forest	New York and Greenwood Lake Railway	Upper Montclair toward Jersey City
- Mountain Avenue Station
- U.S. National Register of Historic Places
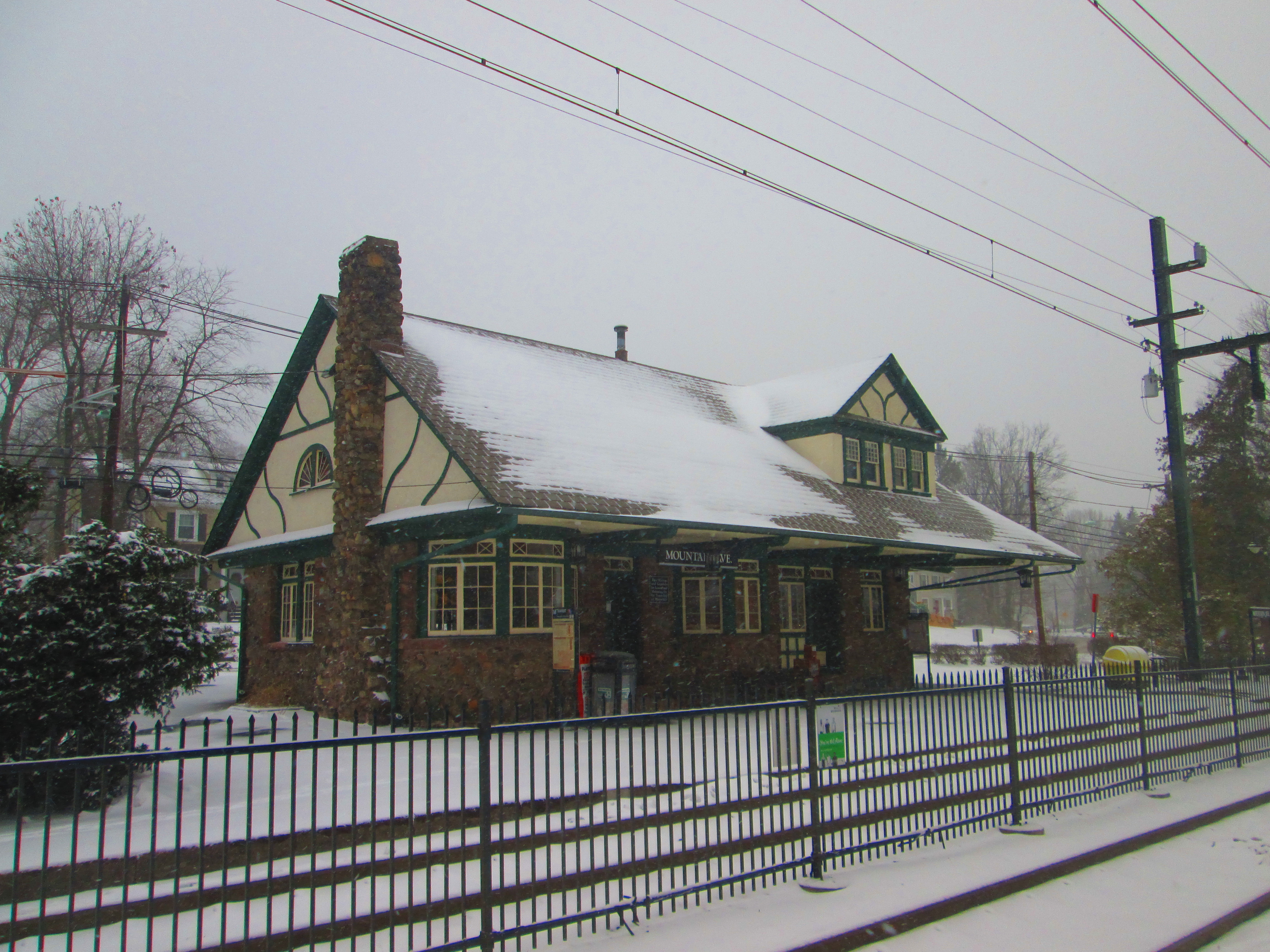
- The station depot at Mountain Avenue, constructed by the Erie Railroad.
- Location: 451 Upper Mountain Ave., Upper Montclair, New Jersey
- Coordinates: 40°50′57″N 74°12′21″W
- Area: 0.3 acres (0.1 ha)
- Built: 1893
- Architect: A. Mordercai
- Architectural style: Queen Anne
- MPS: Operating Passenger Railroad Stations TR
- NRHP reference No.: 84002654
- Added to NRHP: June 22, 1984
Location

Mountain Avenue is an active commuter railroad station in the township of Montclair, Essex County, New Jersey. Serving trains of NJ Transit's Montclair–Boonton Line, Mountain Avenue is one of six stops in the municipality. The next station to the south/east (toward Hoboken Terminal and New York Penn Station) is Upper Montclair. The next station to the north/west (toward Hackettstown) is Montclair Heights. Mountain Avenue contains two low-level side platforms. The station depot built by the Erie Railroad stands on the inbound platform, offering a waiting room for commuters. Part of the depot is also leased by the municipality for a residence.

Mountain Avenue Station debuted with the opening of passenger service on the Montclair Railway (then leased by the New York and Oswego Midland Railroad) on January 1, 1873. The line later became a part of the New York and Greenwood Lake Railway (1878–1943), which was controlled by, and later absorbed into, the Erie Railroad. The current station depot opened in 1893, maintaining an agent until 1959. It was added to the National Register of Historic Places on June 22, 1984, as part of the Operating Passenger Railroad Stations Thematic Resource for New Jersey.

== Station layout ==
The station's low-level side platforms are not wheelchair accessible. Weekend service is not provided.

== Bibliography ==
- Baxter, Raymond J.; Adams, Arthur G. (1999). Railroad Ferries of the Hudson: And Stories of a Deckhand. Fordham, New York: Fordham University Press. ISBN 9780823219544.
- Catlin, George L. (1873). Homes on the Montclair Railway, for New York Business Men. A Description of the Country Adjacent to the Montclair Railway, Between Jersey City and Greenwood Lake. New York, New York: Montclair Railway Company.
- Shaw, William H. (1884). History of Essex and Hudson Counties, New Jersey. Vol. 2. Essex County, New Jersey: Everts & Peck.
- Whittemore, Henry (1894). History of Montclair Township, State of New Jersey: Including the History of Families who Have Been Identified with Its Growth and Prosperity. New York, New York: The Suburban Publishing Company.
