= Montclair–Boonton Line =

Commuter rail line in New Jersey

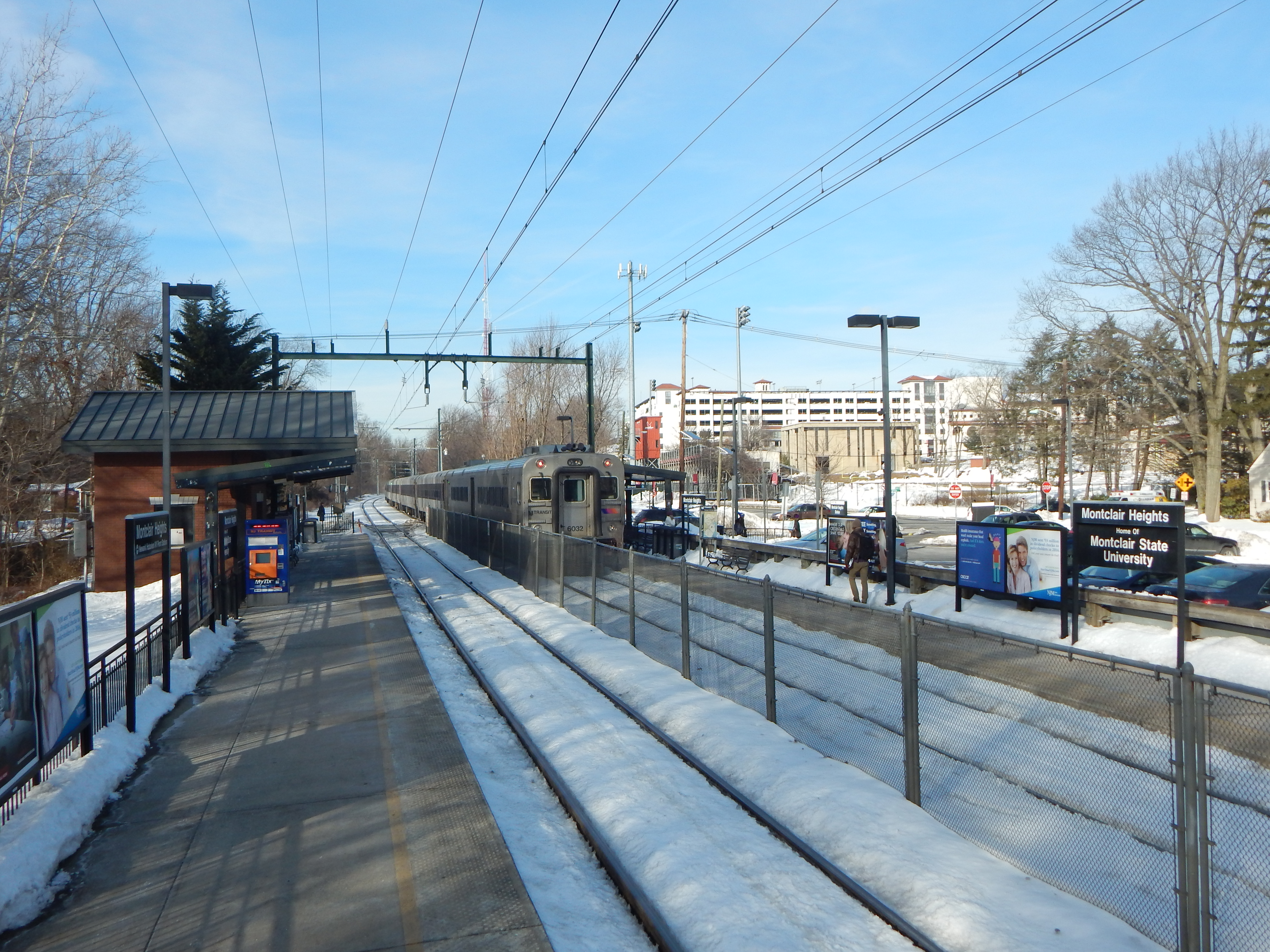
- A westbound train departs Montclair Heights in February 2015

Overview
- Owner: New Jersey Transit
- Locale: North Jersey
- Termini: Hoboken or New York Penn Station (weekdays); Bay Street (weekends) Montclair State University (weekdays) Hackettstown (limited service)
- Stations: 27 (via Hoboken); 28 (via New York Penn Station)

Service
- Type: Commuter rail
- System: New Jersey Transit Rail Operations
- Operator: New Jersey Transit
- Rolling stock: ALP-46 GP40PH-2 F40PH PL42AC GP40FH-2 & ALP-45DP locomotives, MultiLevel coaches, Comet II, IV, & V coaches, Arrow III multiple units
- Daily ridership: 11,850 (Q1, FY 2025)

Technical
- Track gauge: 4 ft 8 1/2 in (1,435 mm) standard gauge
- Electrification: Overhead line, 25 kV 60 Hz AC

The Montclair–Boonton Line is a commuter rail line of New Jersey Transit Rail Operations in the United States. It is part of the Hoboken Division. The line is a consolidation of three individual lines: the former Delaware, Lackawanna & Western Railroad's Montclair Branch, which ran from Hoboken Terminal to Bay Street, Montclair, the Erie Railroad's Greenwood Lake Division, a segment from Montclair to Mountain View–Wayne which originally ran from the Jersey City Terminal to Greenwood Lake, NY, and the former Lackawanna Boonton Line, which ran from Hoboken to Hackettstown, New Jersey.

The Montclair-Boonton line was formed when the Montclair Connection opened on September 30, 2002. The line serves 28 active rail stations in New Jersey along with New York Pennsylvania Station. It crosses through six counties, serving six stations in the township of Montclair, two in the town of Bloomfield, and one in the city of Newark. Trains along the Montclair–Boonton Line heading eastward usually originate at Hackettstown, Mount Olive, Lake Hopatcong, Dover, or Montclair State University, bound for either Hoboken Terminal or New York Penn Station. On system maps the line is colored maroon and its symbol is a bird, after the state bird, the eastern goldfinch.

For 2010, of 31 inbound and 34 outbound daily weekday trains, 21 inbound and 22 outbound Midtown Direct trains (about 66%) use the Kearny Connection to Secaucus Junction and New York Penn Station; the rest go to Hoboken Terminal. Trains to Hoboken run only at rush hour. Passengers can transfer at Secaucus Junction, Newark Broad Street Station, Montclair State University, or Dover to reach other destinations if necessary. Truncated weekend service on the Montclair–Boonton Line began on November 8, 2009, with service every two hours between Bay Street station in Montclair and Hoboken terminal, with the train making all local stops. This was an extension of existing Hoboken-to-Newark service, previously listed on the Morris & Essex timetables.

Plans for connecting the two lines (the New York & Greenwood Lake Railroad, later the Boonton Line and the Montclair Branch, dated back to 1929, when a rail connection through Montclair was proposed. Despite years of debate over the connection, nothing came to fruition until 1991. Lackawanna Terminal in Montclair closed in 1981, replaced by the new Bay Street station on the alignment that eventually would extend to the connection. In 1991, studies were conducted by New Jersey Transit regarding the creation of the Montclair Connection, and in 2002, after construction was completed, the Boonton Line from east of Walnut Street station to Arlington served as a freight-only line.

All passenger trains took the new alignment via the Montclair Branch between a rebuilt Bay Street station and Walnut Street. Service began on September 30, 2002 and three stations on the former Boonton Line were closed: Benson Street in Glen Ridge, Rowe Street in Bloomfield, and Arlington station in Kearny. As of 2022, the surplus rail bed is being repurposed as a rail trail.

Besides the Montclair Connection, service was extended in 1994 from Netcong station to Hackettstown via tracks owned by Conrail (now Norfolk Southern). Stations at Roseville Avenue in Newark, Ampere in East Orange, and Great Notch in Little Falls were closed in 1984, 1991, and 2010 respectively. Two service expansions have been proposed using the under-construction branch to Andover via the Lackawanna Cut-Off Restoration Project, an extension on old New York and Greenwood Lake tracks to Pompton Junction, and the New York, Susquehanna and Western. The latter of these two proposals has not gone through as the Greenwood Lake Tracks from Wayne to Riverdale Borough have been removed for a Rail Trail. There is also a proposal to extend service along the Washington Secondary as a rapid transit improvement to the New Jersey Route 57 corridor via Washington Borough to Phillipsburg.

== History ==
=== Montclair Branch (Delaware, Lackawanna and Western) ===
The Montclair Branch was chartered in 1852 as the Newark and Bloomfield Railroad, running through Bloomfield and nearby West Bloomfield (present-day Montclair). However, tracks were not constructed along the owned right-of-way until 1856; in June of that year trains began running between Newark, Bloomfield, and West Bloomfield. The railroad had a large deficit to start; the ticket agent at West Bloomfield was also the brakeman for the one-car train.

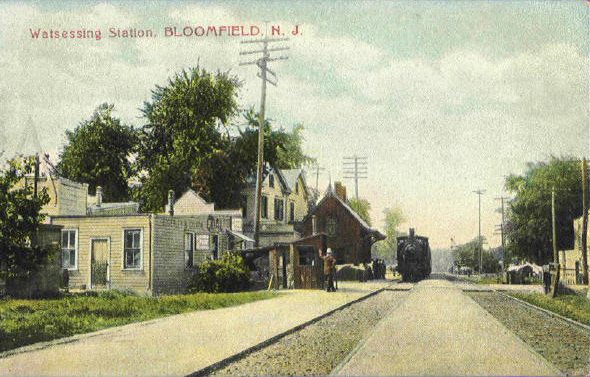
Watsessing Avenue station on the Montclair Branch pre-depression in 1912

On April 1, 1868, the Morris & Essex Railroad bought out the alignment of the Newark and Bloomfield Railroad. The Morris & Essex began running services on the line, which was renamed the "Montclair Branch" when West Bloomfield was similarly renamed to "Montclair" shortly after. The Delaware, Lackawanna and Western Railroad soon gained trackage rights, and by the turn of the 20th century, the railroad had begun constructing track depressions and raises to eliminate grade-level crossings on city streets. In 1912, the Montclair Branch was depressed, elevated, and double tracked, and grade crossings were eliminated. The stations at Watsessing Avenue and Glen Ridge were constructed below street level, while Ampere and Bloomfield stations were constructed above street level. Roseville Avenue station was already depressed, 22 feet (6.7 m) below street level, in 1903.

In June 1913, the new Lackawanna Terminal (named after the Delaware, Lackawanna, and Western) opened in Montclair. William H. Botsford designed it, but did not live to see it open as he died in the sinking of the Titanic in 1912. The brick station building followed a Grecian-Doric style of architecture, which included creative uses of concrete for the arches and dentils. Lackawanna Terminal had six tracks and three concrete platforms, with a large bridge which carried Grove Street in Montclair over the tracks. The Montclair Branch was the first fully electrified suburban railroad, wired in 1930. The inaugural train was driven by Thomas Edison, who had helped develop the line. On July 26, 1945, the Morris & Essex Railroad Company was officially dissolved, and the company became part of the Delaware, Lackawanna, and Western. The lines were then maintained as the Morris & Essex Division.

=== New York and Greenwood Lake Railroad (Erie) ===
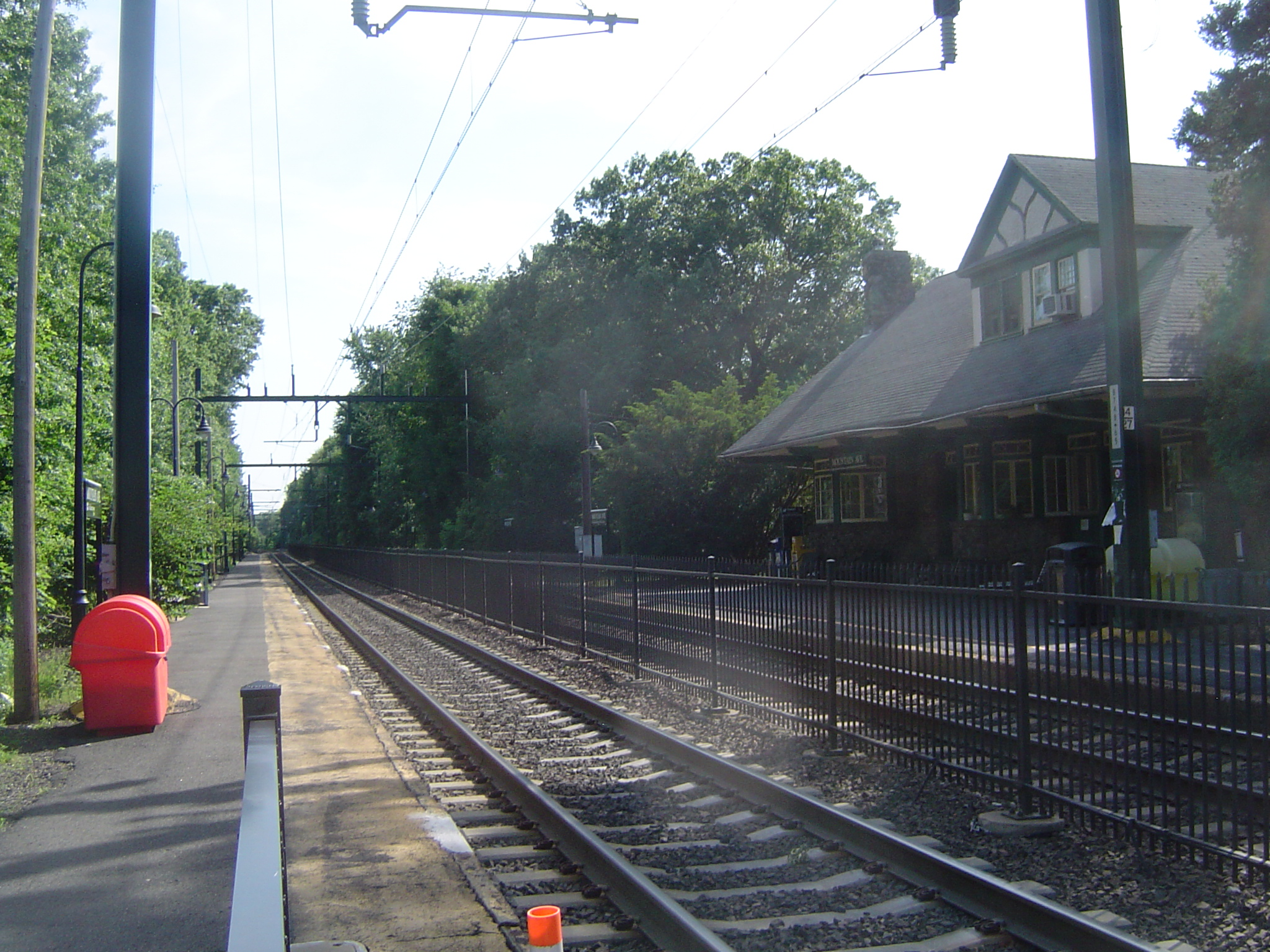
The Mountain Avenue station in Montclair, the only one of the five stations not built in 1872 by the New York & Greenwood Lake

The New York & Greenwood Lake Railway originated as the New York and Montclair Railroad, granted a state charter in 1867 to construct a railroad from Jersey City to the New York state line at Greenwood Lake. The railroad caused the secession of West Bloomfield from Bloomfield, and West Bloomfield renamed itself Montclair. The railroad was completed in 1872 with four stations in Montclair: Montclair, Watchung Avenue, Upper Montclair, and Montclair Heights. The New York & Greenwood Lake Railway became a subsidiary of the Erie Railroad by 1884 and the remains of what was once its track is now the Walnut Street – Mountain View stretch of the Montclair–Boonton Line.

The original railroad extended farther, via the former alignment through Montclair, Glen Ridge, Bloomfield, Newark and reaching into Kearny, where it crossed the Hackensack River and the Meadowlands into Jersey City. It had two stations in the Arlington section of Kearny: Arlington and West Arlington; Forest Hill and North Newark in Newark; Belwood Park, Rowe Street, Orchard Street, and Walnut Street in Bloomfield, and Benson Street in Glen Ridge. At Forest Hill in Newark the Orange Branch split at OJ Tower, constructed in 1897. Orange Branch passenger service was discontinued on May 20, 1955, but freight service lingered until 1994 when the track was removed from White Street in West Orange to the Watsessing section of Bloomfield. A portion of track was used until 2010 by Norfolk Southern to serve the Hartz Mountain plant, which was shuttered that year. At one time the Orange Branch served many industries along its right of way. Some track remains today for the Newark Light Rail, including Silver Lake Station, which was a station on the branch. The station, today known as Walnut Street, was then known as Montclair-Erie Plaza to differentiate it from the nearby Montclair Lackawanna Terminal. The line also had an extension to Sterling Forest and Ringwood near the state line with New York.

=== Boonton Branch ===
The Boonton Branch of the Delaware, Lackawanna and Western Railroad was first constructed as a freight bypass of the Morris & Essex Railroad in 1868. This was constructed due to the unsuitability of its passenger lines to carry freight (and a lack of freight customers along the line) and stretched from the Denville station to Hoboken Terminal via Boonton and Paterson. Freight service began on September 12, 1870, while passenger service began on December 14, 1870.

=== Erie Lackawanna Railroad ===
On October 1, 1960, the Delaware, Lackawanna, and Western Railroad (DL&W) and Erie Railroad merged to form the Erie-Lackawanna Railroad. In 1963, the old DL&W Boonton Branch was abandoned between Mountain View and Paterson and its right of way was sold to the NJ Department of Transportation for the new highways Interstate 80 and what's now known as New Jersey Route 19 (NJ 19 had originally been designated New Jersey Route 20; the westernmost segment of NJ 20 connected eastward via Paterson Plank Road with what is now New Jersey Route 120, replicating Paterson Plank Road from Jersey City through the Meadowlands, Rutherford, and Clifton to Paterson) The railroad could have paid for a single track to be laid along the new highways, but the Erie-Lackawanna demurred as it was strapped for cash. To allow the western end of the Boonton Line access into Hoboken, the east end of the Erie's former Greenwood Lake Branch, between Bergen Junction at Croxton and Mountain View in Wayne, was joined to the west end of the DL&W's former Boonton Line between Wayne and Denville. The line was renamed the Greenwood Lake-Boonton Line in recognition of its two predecessors. The original DL&W Boonton Line east of Clifton was joined with the Erie's Main Line as part of a project to remove tracks through Passaic.

=== New Jersey Transit ===
In 1983, the maintenance of the Montclair Branch and the Boonton Line were taken over entirely by New Jersey Transit. The Boonton Line at that point began out of Hoboken Terminal, heading westward through the Jersey Meadows and into Kearny, crossing the Passaic river at West Arlington and going through North Newark, Bloomfield, and Glen Ridge before entering Montclair and continuing on from the current Walnut Street station to Netcong station. The Montclair Branch, designated part of the Morris & Essex Lines, which consisted of the Montclair Branch, Morristown Line, and Gladstone Branch, had six stations: Roseville Avenue in Newark, Ampere in East Orange, Watsessing Avenue in Bloomfield, Bloomfield station, Glen Ridge station, and Bay Street in Montclair. The Montclair Branch was an electrified service; however, the Boonton Line was a diesel line.

Over the next decade, New Jersey Transit closed several stations over the length of the Montclair Branch. The Harrison and Roseville Avenue stations were closed on September 16, 1984; the Ampere station in East Orange was closed less than seven years later, on April 7, 1991. Plans to extend the Morristown Line and Boonton Line westward from Netcong station to Hackettstown were proposed in June 1992 as part of proposed service extension. On November 6, 1994, service was ceremonially extended along Conrail's Washington Secondary from Netcong station with the creation of the stops in Mount Olive and Hackettstown. NJ Transit leased that portion of the line from Conrail (and later the Norfolk Southern Railway) from 1994 until purchasing it in 2023.

On December 19, 2025, there was a head on collision between two trains along the Montclair–Boonton Line west of the Bay Street station resulting in 17 injuries.

==== Montclair Connection ====
In 2002, New Jersey Transit finished construction of the Montclair Connection, a small set of tracks along Pine Street in Montclair that connected the Boonton Line and the Montclair Branch. The concept of the Montclair Connection had been originated in 1929 by the Regional Plan Association, to connect the New York & Greenwood Lake with the Montclair Branch. However, the Great Depression, which began in 1929, shelved plans for the connection. Three decades after the Erie's Main Line was realigned out of Passaic (in 1963), New Jersey Transit returned to the plan for the Montclair Connection. The original plan was for a one-track diesel connection, but this grew into a two-track electric connection with extension of catenary wires. After negotiations with the township of Montclair, detailed plans and design began in 1998, and construction began just a year later.

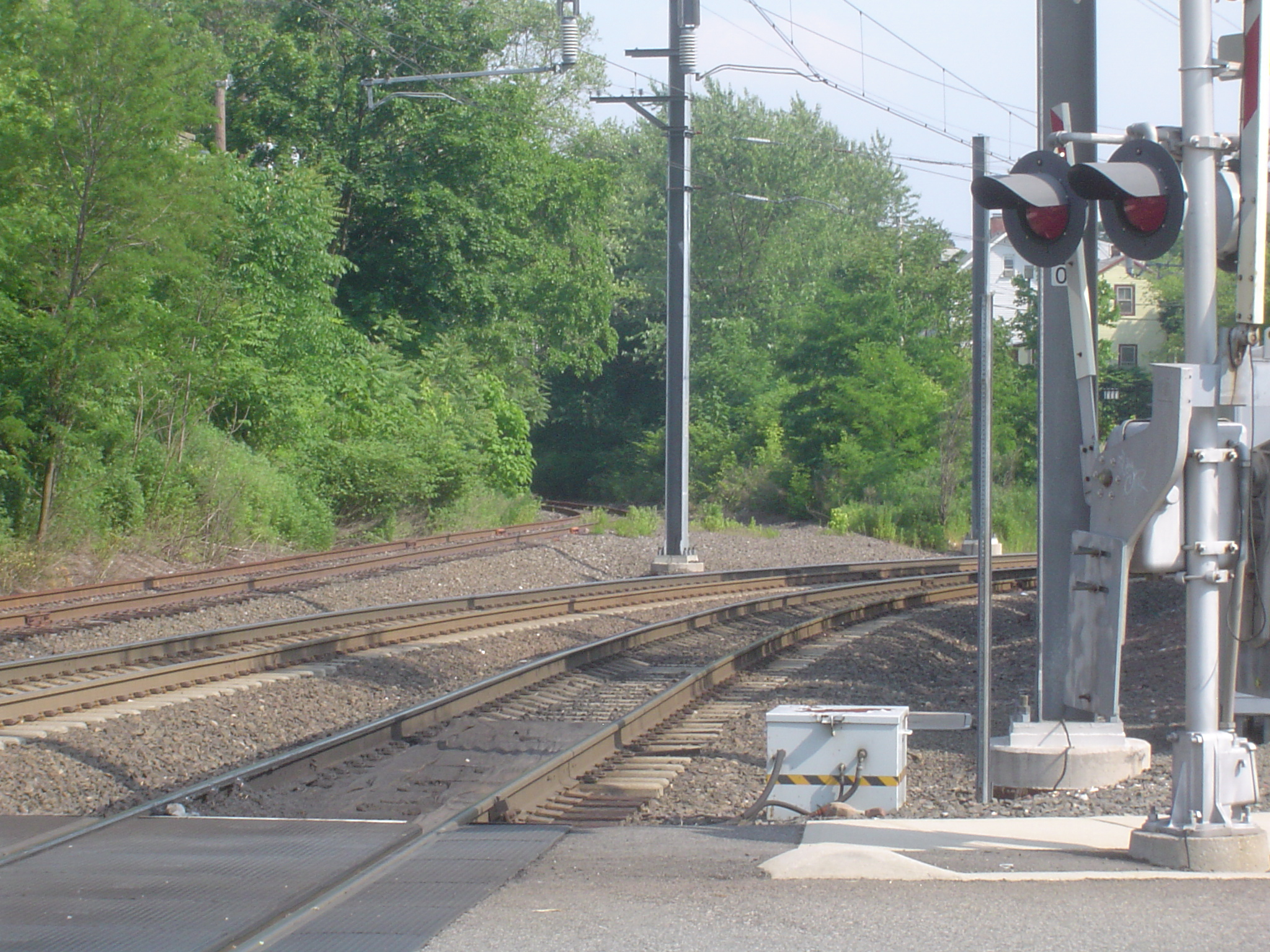
New track alignment to Hoboken curves to the right; old alignment (now single-tracked) veers to the left

When the Montclair Connection was completed in 2002, the names of the Montclair Branch and Boonton Line were eliminated in favor of the labeling the new whole "the Montclair-Boonton Line." Although no stations along the Montclair Branch (Watsessing, Bloomfield, Glen Ridge, and Bay Street) were closed, three stations along the old Greenwood Lake alignment had service end on September 20, 2002: Arlington station, in Kearny, Rowe Street, in Bloomfield, and Benson Street, in Glen Ridge. This alignment was turned over to Norfolk Southern for maintenance. The station building at Benson Street was damaged by a fire in the 1980s and had fallen into disrepair; in May 2009, it was sold to a private developer and entirely rebuilt. During the Montclair Connection's construction, Bay Street station, which was a single platform with only one track, was rebuilt entirely, with two high-level platforms and new tracks.

The new connection also introduced service to New York Penn Station for commuters along the line; trains previously went only to Hoboken Terminal. The new services included diesel service and express trains to Montclair Heights, making stops from Great Notch to Hackettstown, and new Midtown Direct service trains from Montclair Heights to New York, with transfers between them at Great Notch. There was also additional Morristown line Midtown Direct service to New York, available only at Denville and Dover stations. Other upgrades along the line included a revamping of Great Notch Yard for state-of-the-art service. However, no weekend service was implemented on the line.

11 miles of rail line from Montclair to Jersey City were shut down following the completion of the Montclair Connection and the DB and WR drawbridges were abandoned in the open position. Shortly thereafter a coalition of walking, biking and trails group began to advocate for the railway to be converted into a trail and greenway known as the "Essex-Hudson Greenway."

==== Montclair State University Station ====
On June 10, 2002, Governor of New Jersey James E. McGreevey announced a partnership with Montclair State University (MSU) as part of the Midtown Direct service. On July 18, 2002, partnership announced plans for a new train station and parking facility for commuters in Little Falls. Before the Construction of Montclair State University Station, students at Montclair State University could only use Montclair Heights station to access the campus. Construction of the station was delayed by lawsuits from the township of Montclair because of residential displacement and parking issues. The station was proposed with a 1300-space parking deck and a cost of $36 million (2002 USD). The $36 million came entirely from the New Jersey Economic Development Authority in bonds to Montclair State University.

On October 20, 2004, the new Montclair State University Station at Little Falls opened in a ceremony led by executive director George Warrington and MSU president Susan Cole. The new station had a parking deck with 1500 spaces, reducing road congestion. This differed from the original proposal, which had called for 1,300 parking spaces. Electrified service was then extended from Montclair Heights station north a mile to Montclair State University, although catenary wires continue westward to the former Great Notch station.

==== Wayne Route 23 and Mount Arlington stations ====
Prior to 2008, the only station in Wayne was the downtown Mountain View station. The only station in the area around Lake Hopatcong was Lake Hopatcong station in Landing (this station has been referred to on timetables as Lake Hopatcong-Mount Arlington). In 2008, both the Wayne Route 23 Transit Center and Mount Arlington Intermodal Train Station and Park & Ride opened.

Wayne Route 23 is located in Wayne, near the Westbelt Mall at the U.S. Route 46, Interstate 80, Route 23 interchange; this was also the site of the Singac station, which closed four decades before the new transit center opened. On September 13, 2006, construction of the $16.3 million project was announced; the general contractor was J.H. Reid of South Plainfield. The new station was built to reduce traffic on nearby highways, by diverting commuters to trains or buses.

Construction on Mount Arlington Station, which was already a parking lot with 228 spaces for Lakeland Bus, began on April 12, 2006. The new train station was built to relieve traffic on Interstate 80, and 57 new parking spaces were added to the lot. The project was slated to cost $12.1 million, and the contract was given to Terminal Construction Corporation of Wood-Ridge. Both stations were completed within nine days of each other: the Wayne-Route 23 Transit Center opened on January 12, 2008, with train service beginning two days later; Mount Arlington Station opened on January 21, 2008, and is the newest station on the line.

==== Weekend service ====
In 2002, after construction on the Montclair Connection was completed, there was no weekend service on the new Montclair–Boonton Line. Over the ensuing six years, officials from Montclair urged New Jersey Transit to offer weekend service on the Montclair–Boonton Line, which was the only NJT line without it. Montclair Township's proposal cited the benefits of weekend service to the communities along the line, including reduced traffic congestion and carbon footprint. The agency repeatedly declined to expand the service because Montclair limited the use of train horns between 7 pm and 7 am. New Jersey Transit had received requests for weekend service since 2007, and denied them citing capacity issues and turning off electric power for bridge replacement. Advocates have dismissed these reasons as "excuses" and locals said it would improve their quality of life.

On September 30, 2009, New Jersey Transit announced service every two hours between Bay Street station and Hoboken Terminal, an approximately 35-minute trip. The service started on November 8, 2009 with a ceremony at Bay Street station in Montclair.

==== Closure of Great Notch ====
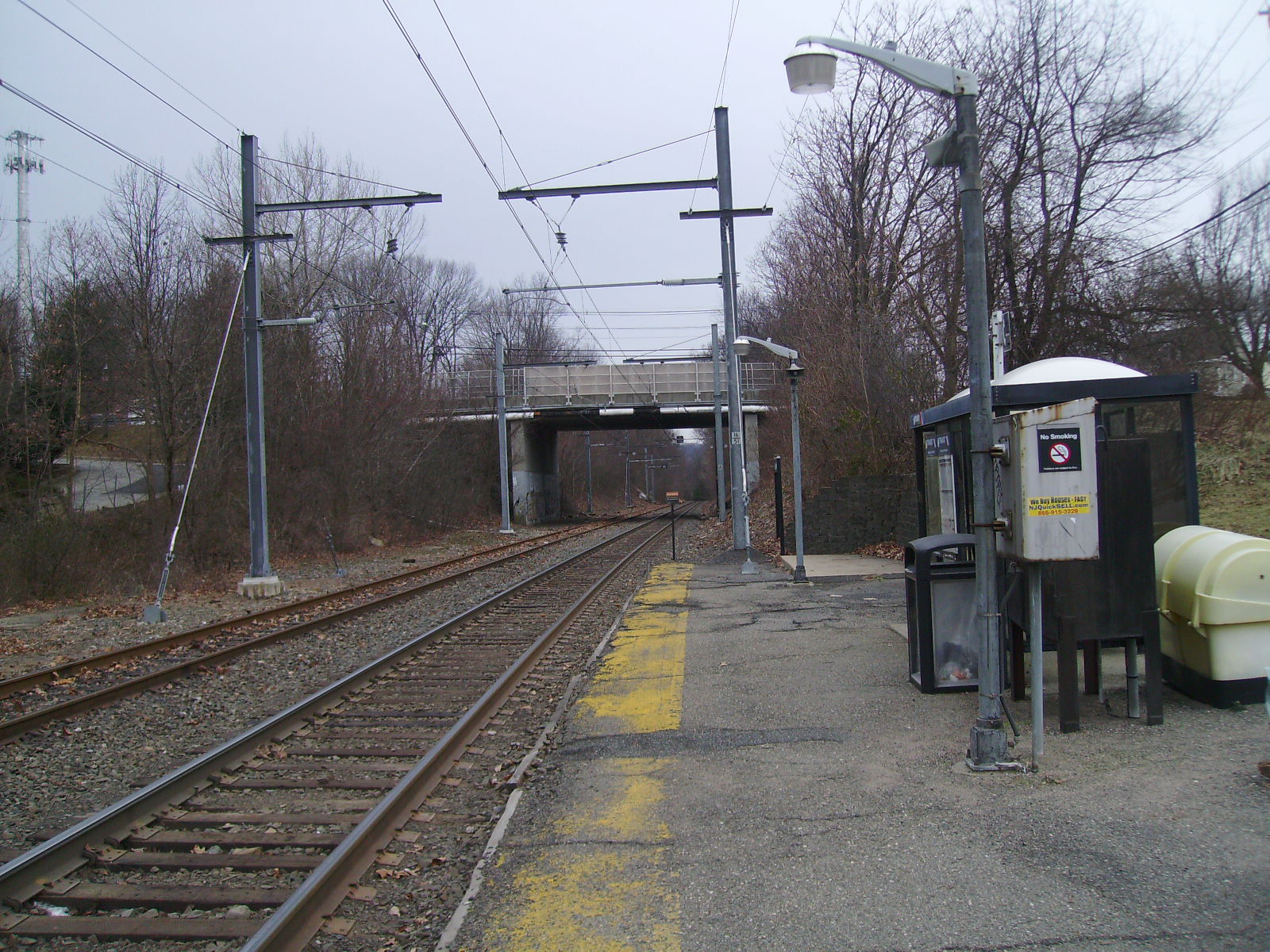
Great Notch Station looking towards Hackettstown prior to closure

Great Notch was a small station on the south side of Long Hill Road (Passaic County Route 631) in Great Notch. The station dated back to 1905 as a transfer point between the New York & Greenwood Lake and its Caldwell Branch to Essex Fells, New Jersey. The station was important in its heyday, but after the opening of Montclair State University station in 2004, about a mile away, ridership at the old station, which had only 69 parking spaces, began to dwindle. By January 2008, only one train inbound to Hoboken and two trains outbound towards Hackettstown/Dover stopped at Great Notch. In August 2008, New Jersey Transit approached the community of Great Notch, part of Little Falls, saying that the 103-year-old station would be closed by October. After a few days, there was public protest against the possible closure, and on September 3, a public meeting was held to strike a deal with residents.

On April 1, 2009, after negotiations with Michael DeFrancisci, the mayor of Little Falls, the station and town were given a "one-year test" to attract ridership at the small station. The quota to keep the station open was 67 people using the station by December 31, 2009 and 100+ by April 1, 2010. On December 18, 2009, the test was canceled when Little Falls was informed by New Jersey Transit that the Great Notch Station would be closed on January 17, 2010 due to the anemic ridership at the station. New Jersey Transit cited in a press release that the station only was receiving an average of nine boardings daily. The remaining passengers were directed to use either Montclair State University station or Little Falls station.

==== Hurricane Sandy ====
The Montclair–Boonton Line experienced serious damage from Hurricane Sandy on October 29–30, 2012, due to fallen trees blocking the tracks and bringing down catenary and signal wires. The line was completely shut down until November 14, when limited electric Midtown Direct and Hackettstown-Hoboken diesel service was restored.

== Service extensions ==
=== Lackawanna Cut-Off ===
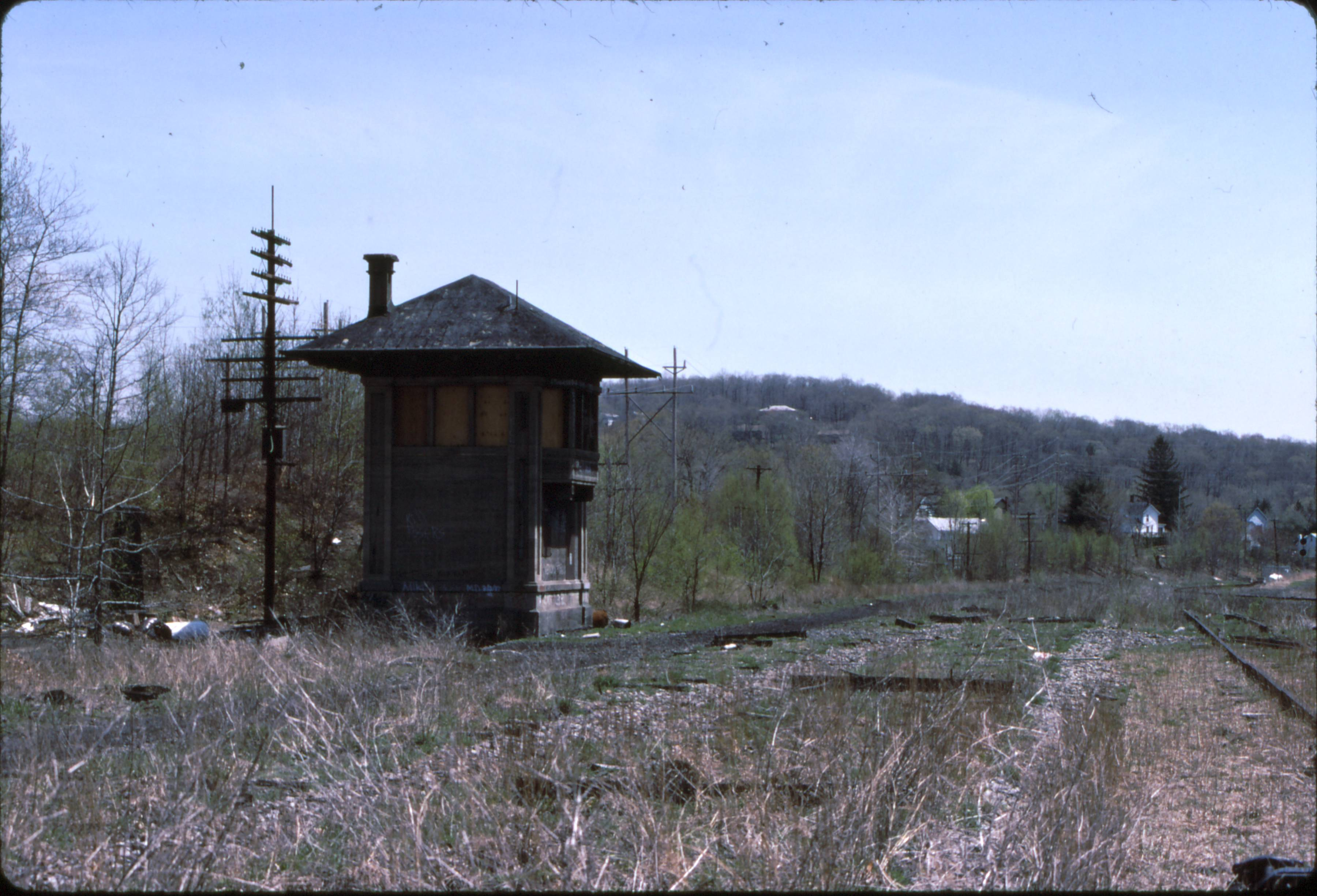
Port Morris ("UN") Tower has not seen a train pass in over a decade in this photo. The connection to NJ Transit's Montclair-Boonton Line to New York is a short distance past the tower

According to the 2020 Transit: Possibilities For The Future report produced by New Jersey Transit in October 2000, the Montclair–Boonton Line is a candidate for further rail expansion beyond the Montclair Connection. The Lackawanna Cut-Off, a project from Lake Hopatcong to Scranton, Pennsylvania, is to start off as the Andover Branch off Montclair–Boonton Line trains. The Lackawanna Cut-Off was the former Delaware, Lackawanna and Western Railroad's relocated mainline, which had passenger service from 1911 to 1970. As part of the Minimal Operable Segment (MOS), only a 7.3-mile (11.7 km) stretch to Andover, New Jersey is to be active. Passenger trains will use an upgraded alignment from the Montclair-Boonton/Morristown mainline at Port Morris Junction with several Montclair-Boonton trains taking the junction to Andover.

=== Beyond Hackettstown ===
The report also cited the study of extending service on the Montclair-Boonton from the current Hackettstown station, a single-sided platform in downtown Hackettstown along the current Washington Secondary, maintained by Norfolk Southern to Phillipsburg, New Jersey via Washington. One of two extensions proposed to Phillipsburg, the line would follow New Jersey Route 57 through Port Murray, Rockport, Washington, Stewartsville, and into Phillipsburg, where it would meet an extended Raritan Valley Line. Locals have expressed support for the extensions on the active Class I freight line, and would use automobiles to get to the stations' newly designed park and rides. The expansion of passenger service on the Washington Secondary is a small part of new public transport on the Route 57 corridor, an attempt to attract service past Hackettstown from the northern New Jersey and New York corridors. However, the candidate project has not yet been funded by New Jersey Transit.

=== Pompton Extension ===
The third and final extension relates to the possibility of using the New York and Greenwood Lake trackage from Mountain View station northward to the old Pompton Junction station. The project, called the Pompton Extension, is part of an effort to connect service from the Montclair-Boonton to the candidate rail service to Sparta, New Jersey on the New York, Susquehanna and Western Railroad. This service would connect the stations at Pequannock, Pompton Plains, Bloomingdale and connect at the site of the former Pompton Junction station. However, unlike the other projects, the Pompton Extension is still in study and not a candidate for funding. A location for a yard in Sparta could not be agreed on.

== Route description ==
=== East of Bloomfield ===
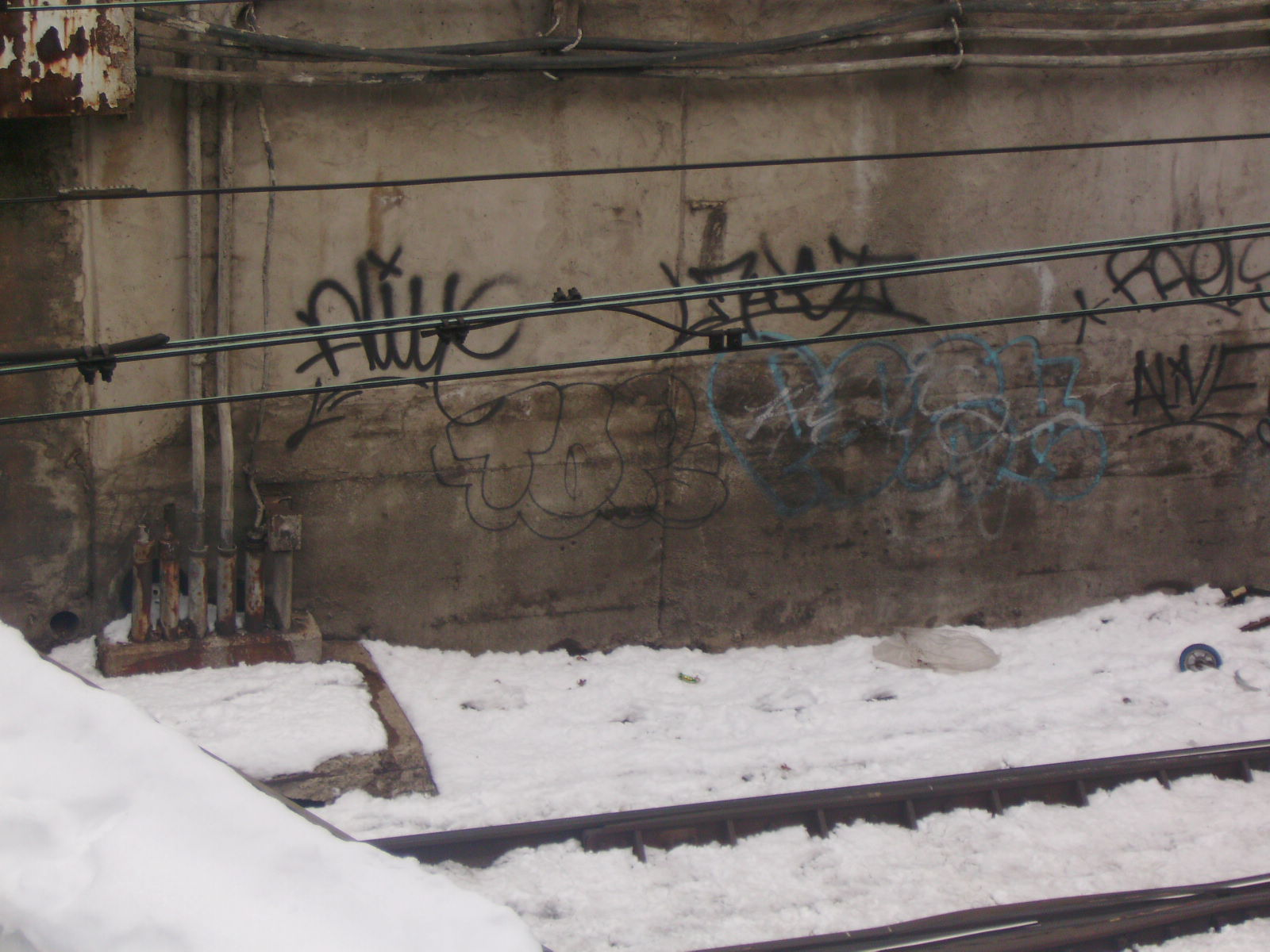
The remnants of Roseville Avenue station in 2010, 26 years after closing

Train service on the Montclair–Boonton Line begins at either Hoboken Terminal, which includes all weekend service, or New York Penn Station. From there, trains use the alignment of the Morristown Line west through the Bergen Tunnels from Hoboken, over the Lower Hack Lift bridge across the Hackensack River. After crossing the Hackensack, the lines pass through Kearny and Harrison. Harrison was the site of a passenger station built in 1904 during the track-raising project by William Truesdale, which started in 1901.

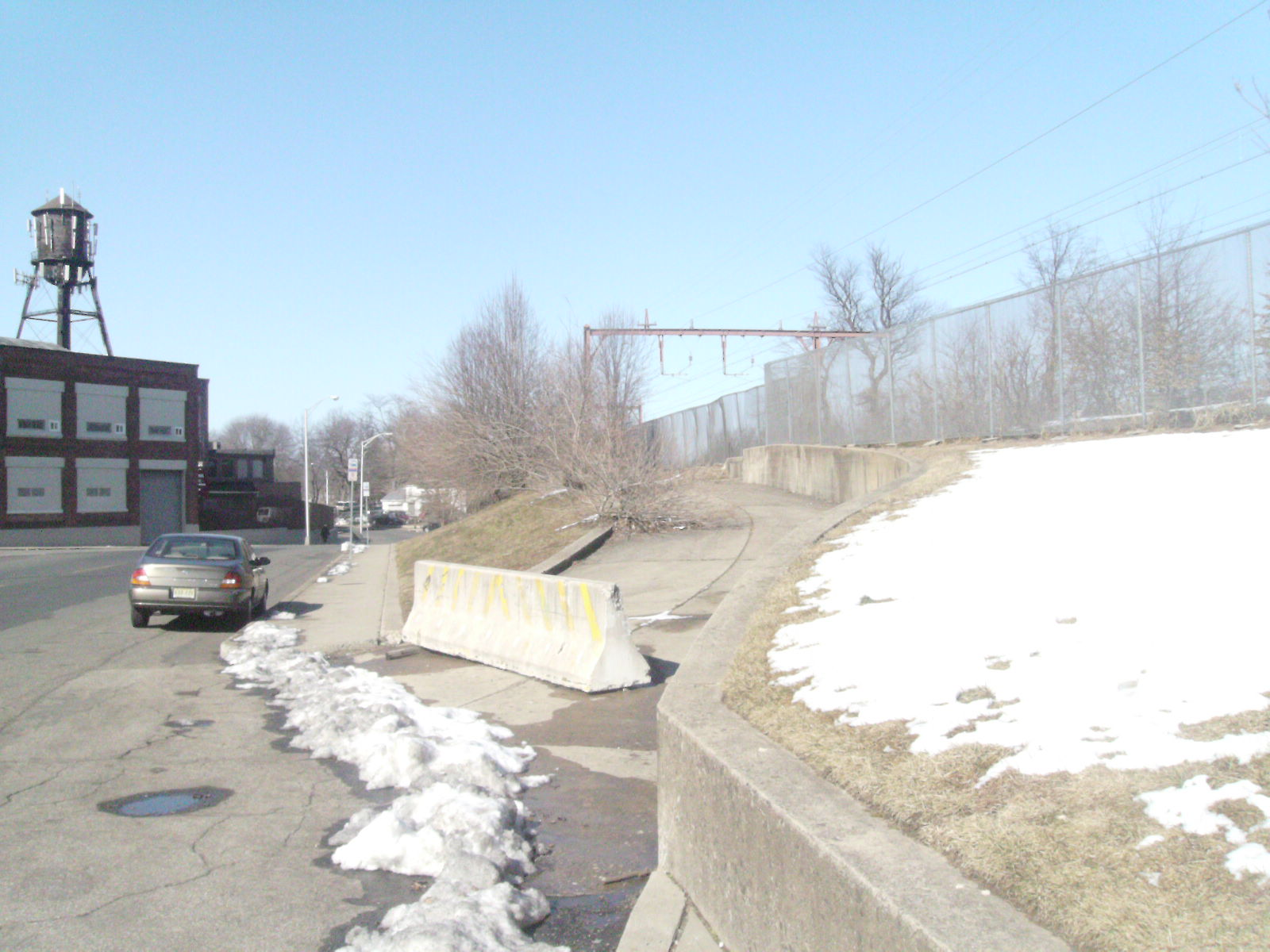
Ampere station site, taken almost 19 years after closing

From Harrison, the lines cross over the Passaic River and along Bridge 7.48, a swing drawbridge built in 1901, where they enter the city of Newark and stop at Newark Broad Street Station. Broad Street Station is the first station in active service after Secaucus Junction. Continuing through Newark, the station enters the Roseville district of Newark, where the former Roseville Avenue station was located. Roseville Avenue was constructed in 1905, in the track depression through Roseville along the Morris & Essex Lines. Roseville Avenue Station had two separate sets of platforms (one for the Montclair Branch and one for the Morris & Essex Lines). Although the station was closed on September 16, 1984, the Roseville Tower remained until it was demolished in 2002 to make way for the Montclair Connection. At Roseville Avenue station, the Montclair–Boonton Line and Morris & Essex Lines diverge, with the Morris & Essex continuing west to Summit and points west, while the Montclair-Boonton turns to the north through Roseville and into the community of East Orange, where it crosses through the Ampere district.

Near the intersection of Springdale Avenue and Ampere Parkway, trains pass through the site of the former Ampere Station. Ampere was built around 1909 and remained in use during New Jersey Transit days until April 7, 1991, when along with Grove Street, the station was closed. From here, the lines continue into Bloomfield.

=== Bloomfield and Glen Ridge ===
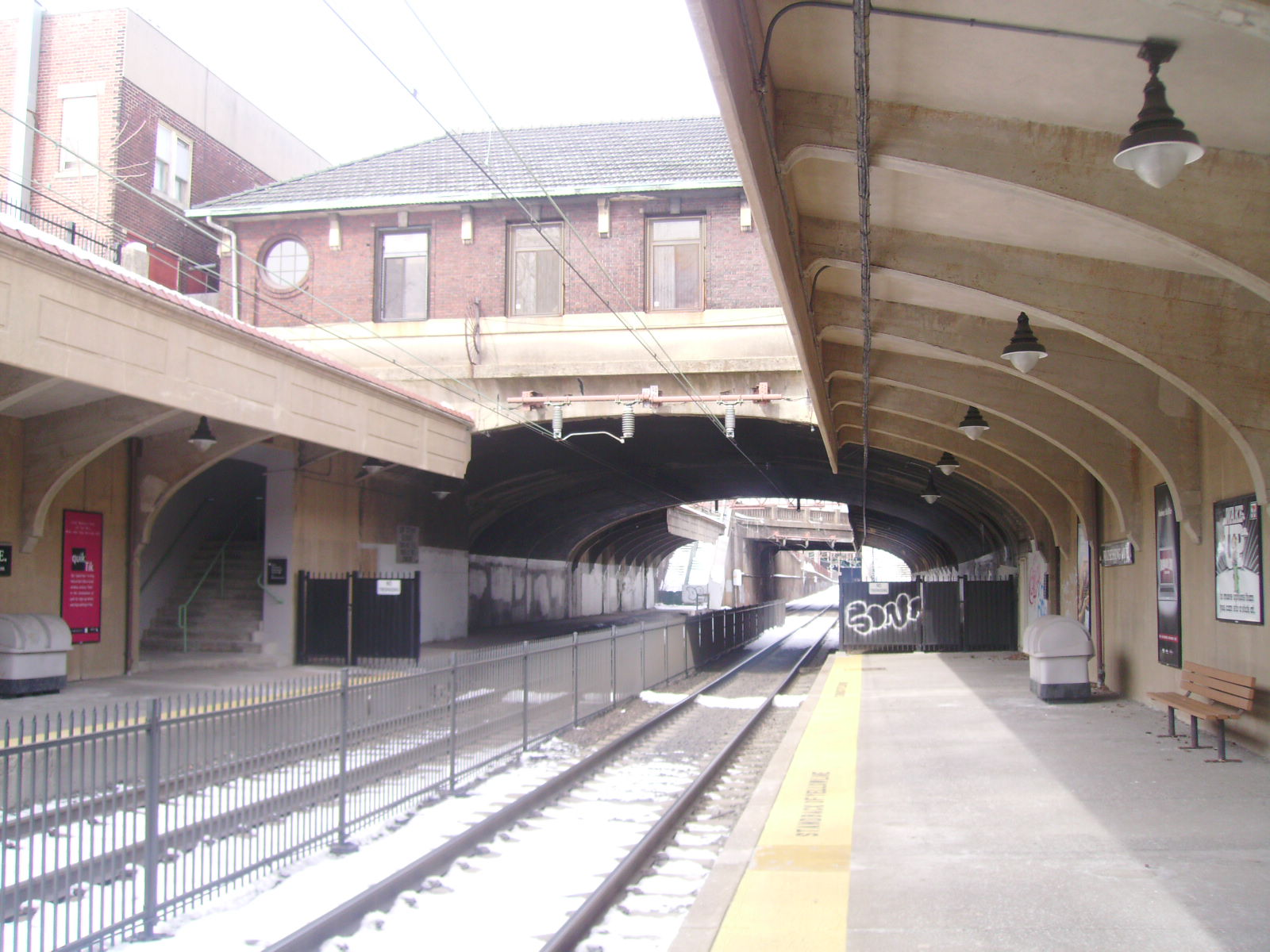
Watsessing Avenue station as viewed from its Hackettstown/Montclair platform

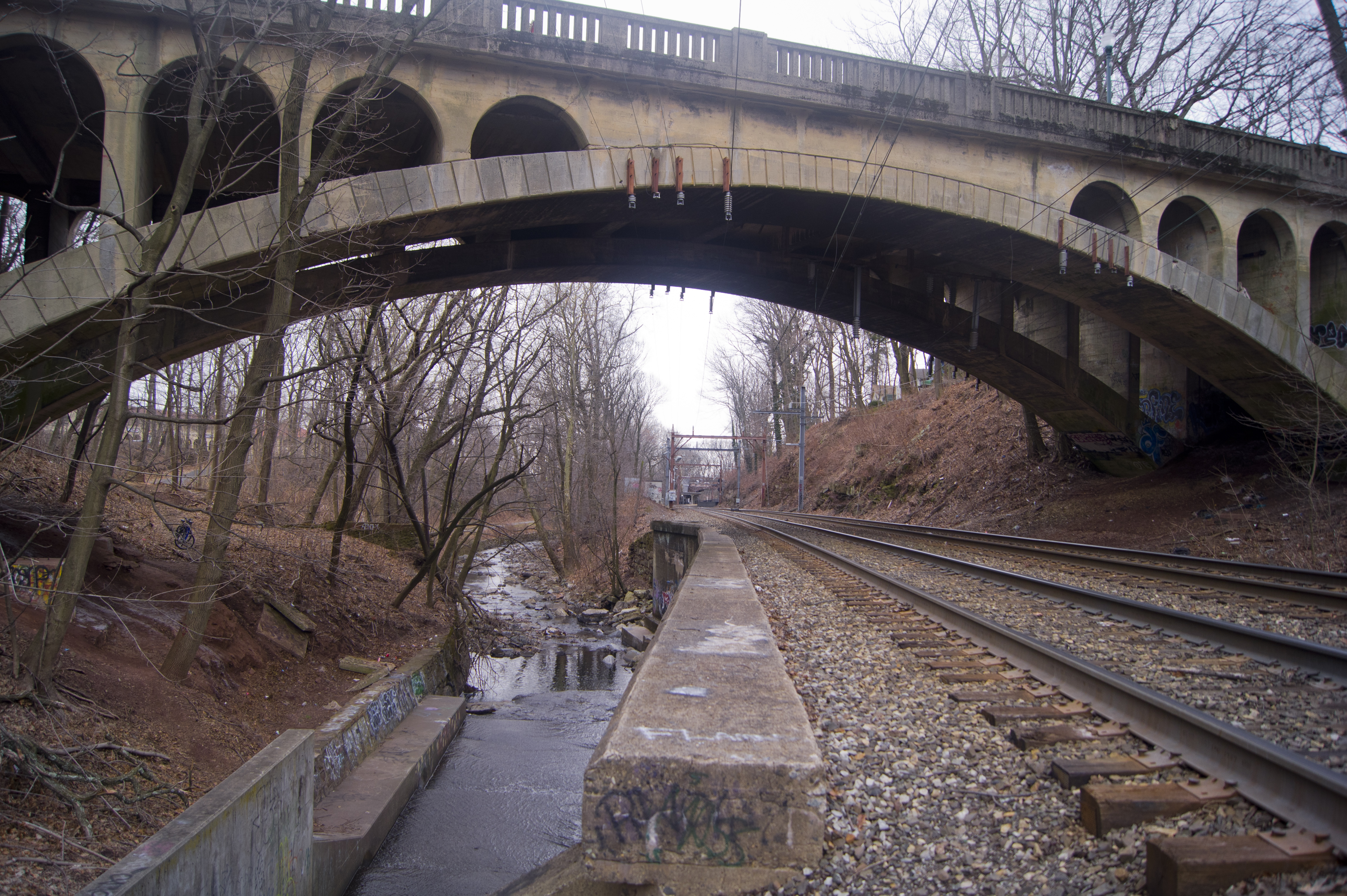
The Montclair-Boonton Line passing under the Freeman Parkway Bridge, with Toney's Brook running parallel.

After crossing from East Orange into Bloomfield, the Montclair–Boonton Line almost immediately enters its next station (and its first past Newark Broad Street), the Watsessing Avenue station. The station is on an open cut, and is one of two stations that were built underground during the grade crossing elimination in 1912. After crossing under Watsessing Avenue (and Dodd Street), the lines continue northward, crossing under the Garden State Parkway between the northbound and southbound toll plazas of Exit 148. After traversing Watsessing Park, the tracks return to being above-ground and enter Bloomfield Station. The current Bloomfield station was constructed in 1912 during grade crossing elimination, when tracks were raised above street-level. From here, the station continues northwestward, paralleling Toney's Brook through Bloomfield (to the southeast of Bloomfield Avenue). After a short distance, the tracks enter the community of Glen Ridge and heads back below street level. At the overpass with Ridgewood Avenue (Essex County Route 653), the line enters the namesake Glen Ridge station. Glen Ridge contains two platforms, and its station building, built in 1912, is above track level, similar to Watsessing Avenue. After Glen Ridge station, the Montclair–Boonton Line continues west before crossing under Bloomfield Avenue (County Route 506) and entering Montclair.

=== Montclair ===
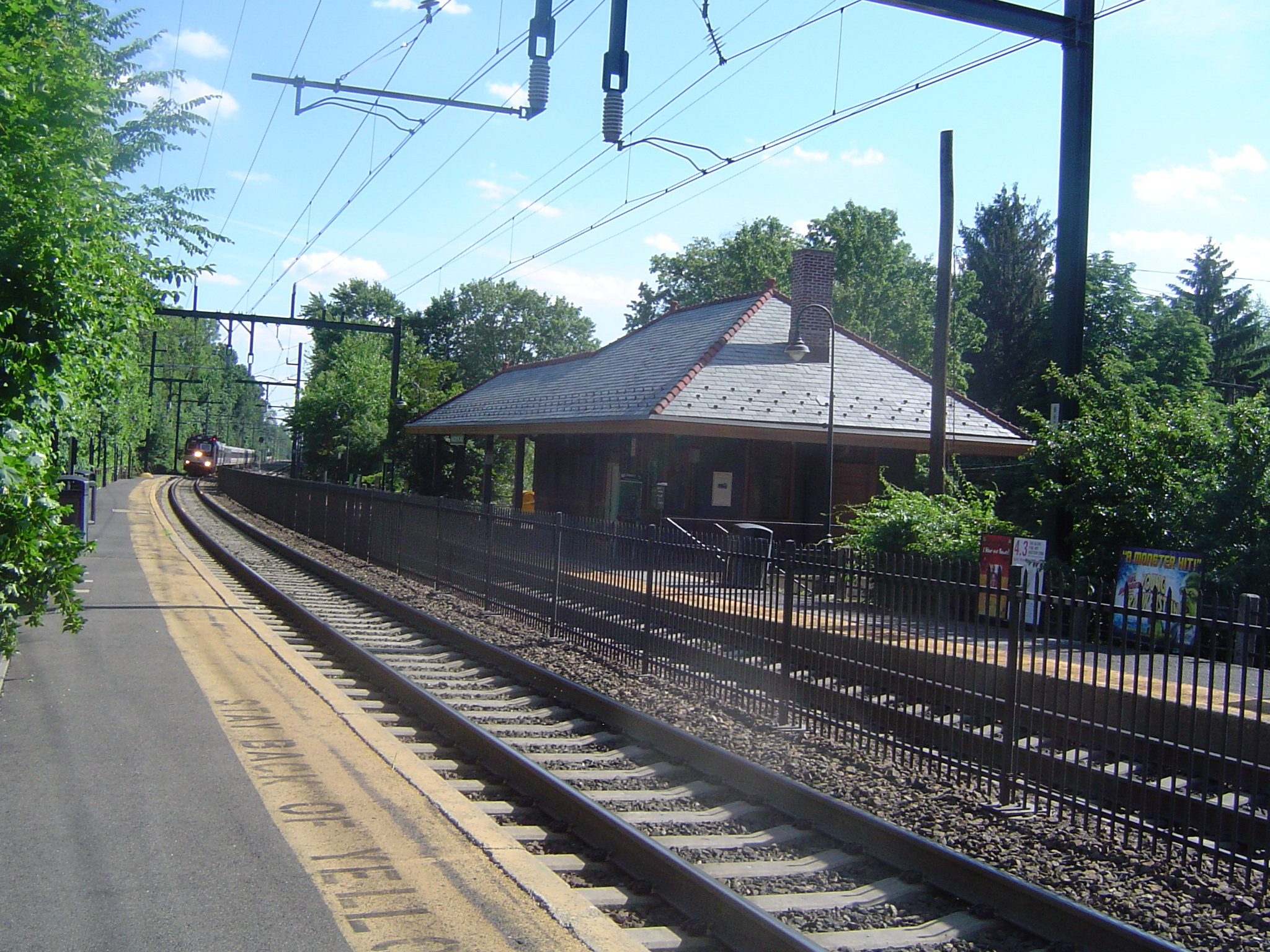
Watchung Avenue station facing towards the Hackettstown-direction

After crossing under Bloomfield Avenue the Montclair–Boonton Line enters the namesake community of Montclair. It leaves the DL&W alignment and curves rightward into Bay Street station just after Bloomfield Avenue. Bay Street is the newest station on the Montclair Branch portion of the Montclair–Boonton Line, built in 1981 to replace the nearby Lackawanna Terminal, which was becoming a "white elephant". This station is the north end of service on weekends. After Bay Street the line parallels Pine Street on new track to join the Erie (NY&GL) alignment. After the merge near the intersection of Pine Street and Grant Street the line continues north and enters Walnut Street station near Erie Park (named after the Erie Railroad that once used the rails). The current Walnut Street station was built in 1952 as Montclair station after the larger structure was demolished. This station is the first of the five along the New York & Greenwood Lake portion of the Montclair–Boonton Line and has two low side platforms at grade.

The lines parallel Erie Street, once again named after the predecessor railroad, continuing north through several parks in Montclair. After Woodman Field the line enters the Watchung Avenue station, the third of six stations in Montclair. Watchung Avenue Station was built in 1901 as an Erie Railroad Type V station (according to the 1920 Interstate Commerce Report for the Erie), separated by less than a mile from the nearby stations.

Watchung Avenue station has two low platforms on embankments and sits next to a bridge over the namesake Watchung Avenue.

=== Upper Montclair ===
The tracks continue northward across the bridge and Valley Road where they enter the Upper Montclair district. The tracks parallel Anderson Park before crossing Bellevue Avenue and entering the Upper Montclair station. Upper Montclair is the fourth station in Montclair, also having two low platforms. The old Type V station building, built in 1898, suffered a fire on February 5, 2006.

The station building is being rebuilt, although larger than the original. Although a planned re-opening was set for the weekend of February 14, 2010, the new Upper Montclair station was ceremoniously reopened by New Jersey Transit and state officials, along with Montclair mayor Jerry Fried on June 18, 2010.

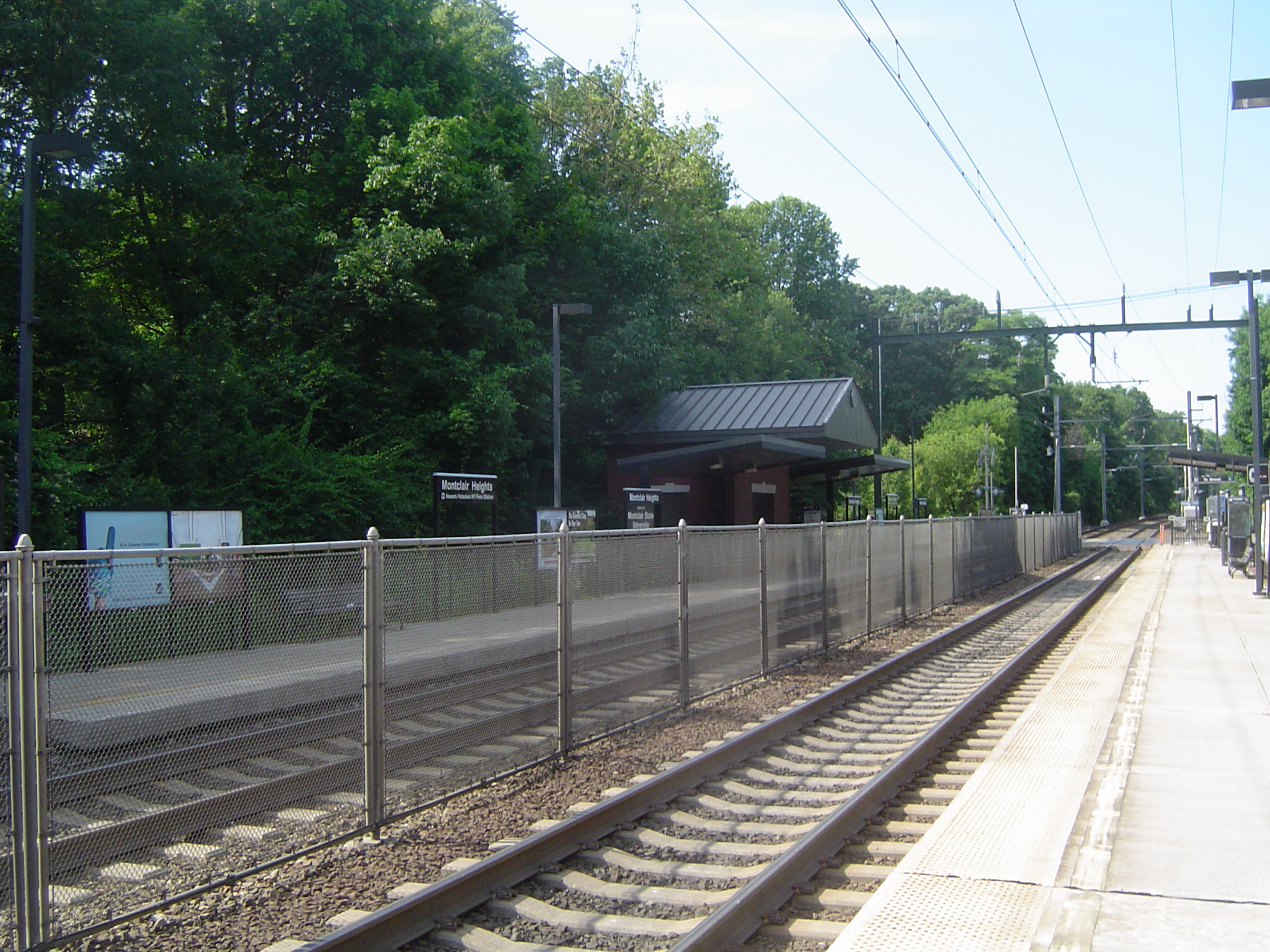
Montclair Heights station facing northward towards Montclair State University station

After Upper Montclair station the tracks turn northeast, crossing under Lorraine Avenue, and paralleling Valley Road. The line continues northward paralleling Upper Mountain Avenue through the Upper Montclair district. A short distance later, the tracks enter Mountain Avenue, the next to last station in Montclair. Mountain Avenue has two low platforms, and the nearby station building, which is rented by New Jersey Transit as a private residence. The building was constructed in 1889 by the New York & Greenwood Lake as an irregular shape, similar to Benson Street station on the former Boonton Line alignment east of Montclair. After Mountain Avenue the tracks continue northward through Upper Montclair, passing through Mountainside Park and crossing Mount Hebron Road.

After Mount Hebron Road, the tracks pass a bird sanctuary and enter the Montclair Heights station. The final station in Montclair, Montclair Heights has a mini-high ADA ramp and low platforms. The original station building was constructed in 1905 under an Erie Type V design, until closure in 1959 by the Erie Railroad for economic reasons. The station is also signed as the "Home of Montclair State University". The station itself is at the south end of the campus and was the transfer station until the namesake station for the college opened in 2004. After Montclair Heights, the trains cross town lines, leaving Montclair in favor of Little Falls, New Jersey.

=== Montclair State University to Little Falls ===
Along the southern end of Montclair State University, the Montclair–Boonton Line crosses out of Montclair north of Montclair Heights station and into the town Little Falls. The tracks head northward, paralleling Long Hill Road (Passaic County Route 631) through the university campus. From there, the road begins a parallel along Clove Road and soon enters the final active electrified station along the Montclair–Boonton Line until Denville, Montclair State University station (officially known as the Montclair State University Station at Little Falls). The station is the set transfer between electric and diesel service, as people heading westward to Dover or Hackettstown need to transfer for further service. The station has a large island platform and also has a 1530-space parking garage on campus.

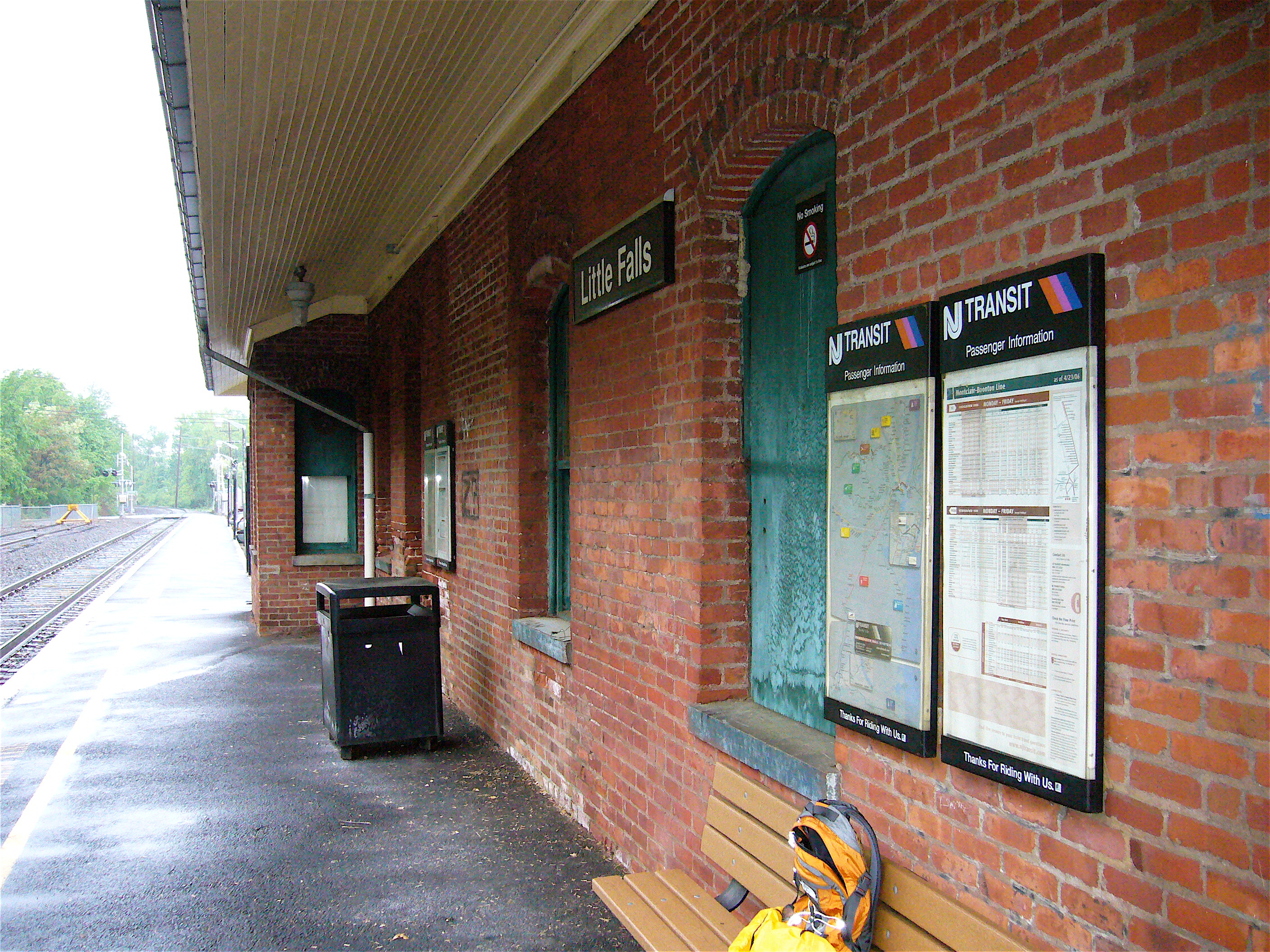
Little Falls station viewed from the 1915 station building

A short distance after Montclair State University, the tracks turn to the northwest, leave campus grounds and cross over Clove Road. The tracks loop around campus and pass Great Notch Yard and the site of the now-closed Great Notch station. Great Notch was a one platform station in the Great Notch district of Little Falls. The station consisted of a shelter (which replaced a building built in 1905 and burned down in 1988) and benches. After ridership at the station became "anemic", Great Notch was shut down on January 17, 2010, with the last train departing two days prior. Great Notch and its Yard serve as the end of the electrified catenary wires above on the Montclair–Boonton Line. This station was also the site of the transfer to the Erie's Caldwell Branch to Essex Fells, New Jersey, torn up in 1979.

After Great Notch, the tracks continued southwestward through Little Falls, crossing under Long Hill Road (CR 631) and Francisco Road (CR 612) before making a curve back to the northwest at a siding on Cedar Grove Road. The tracks then go over a curved bridge over the Peckman River. The northwestern-bound tracks enter downtown Little Falls, paralleling New Jersey Route 23 into the namesake Little Falls station at Union Boulevard (CR 646). Little Falls is a one low platform station, with the original building, constructed in 1915, standing on the single platform. The station has a 194-spot parking lot and the brick building is used as a waiting room. After the station, the tracks continue northwestward, approaching the Passaic River once again at the community of Singac. The community of Singac is the former site of the namesake Singac Station, which has been out of service for quite a while. After the Passaic, the tracks enter the town of Wayne.

=== Wayne Route 23 and Mountain View ===
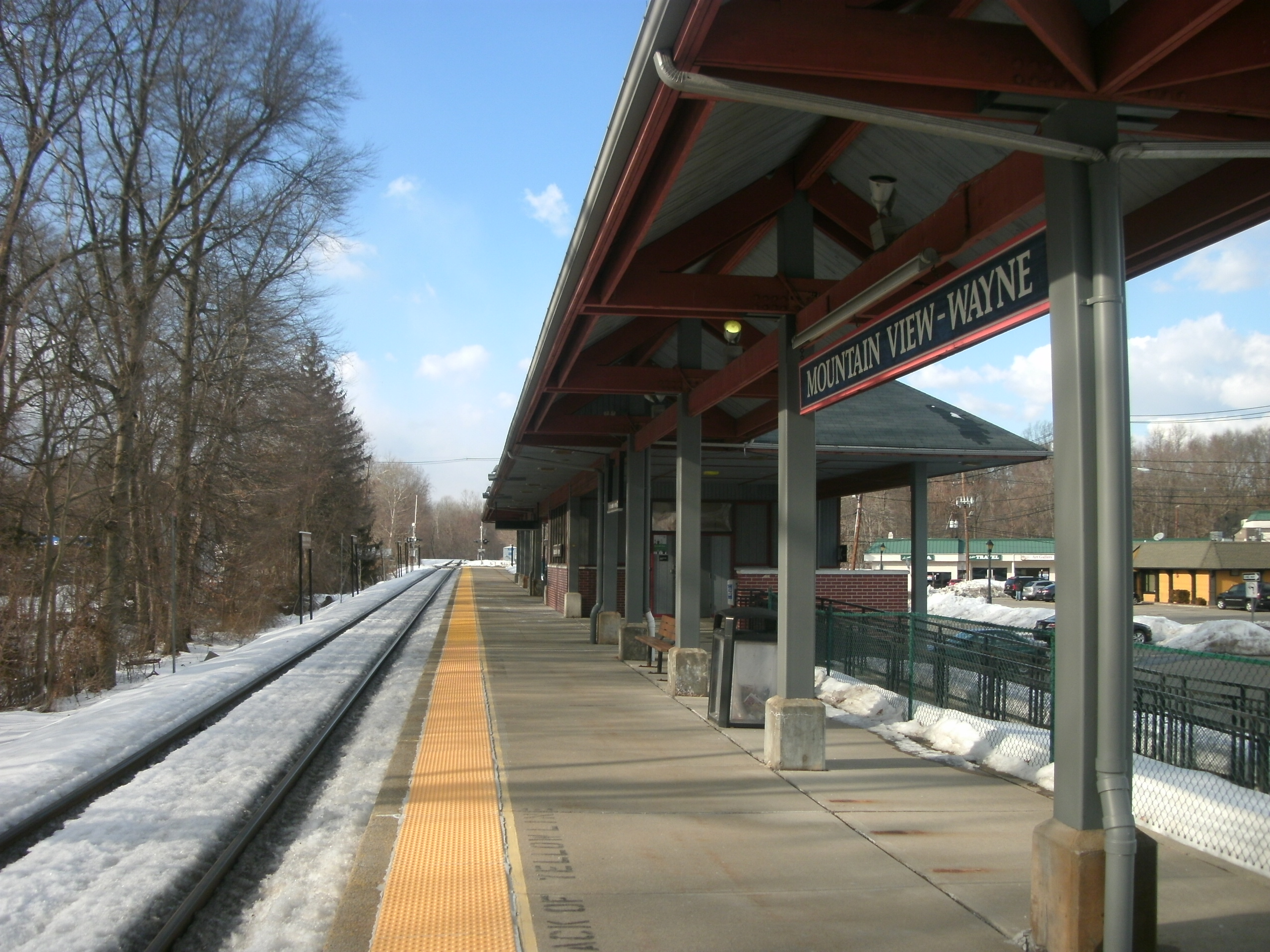
Mountain View station in the Mountain View section of Wayne, facing northbound towards MV Junction

After crossing County Route 631 for yet a third time in Singac, the tracks cross over the Passaic River and enter Wayne, New Jersey. There, the tracks parallel Route 23 near Willowbrook Mall and through the interchange between Route 23, U.S. Route 46, and Interstate 80. After crossing under Interstate 80, the tracks parallel Route 23 and into Westbelt, where the tracks enter the second-newest station on the line, the Wayne Route 23 Transit Center. Wayne-Route 23 opened on January 12, 2008 with a single high platform and the nearby bus terminal. Wayne Route 23 Transit Center also contains 1,000 parking spaces for use by travelers.

After leaving Wayne Route 23, the tracks continue to parallel Route 23 and enter downtown Wayne. The tracks cross Fayette Avenue Park and parallel the Pequannock River into the U.S. Route 202 and Route 23 in the downtown portion. After paralleling Fayette Avenue, the tracks enter Mountain View station. Mountain View station has one low platform and serves as the station for downtown Wayne. The station building at Mountain View was built in 1910 as an Erie Type 4 station (according to the ICC reports), but by 1965 had been replaced by a simple Armco shelter. Mountain View was also the site of the New York & Greenwood Lake's extension to Pequannock, the New York Susquehanna & Western in Pompton Lakes, and eventually Wanaque, New Jersey. Today, Norfolk Southern Local H-02 uses it twice a week to reach the Totowa Industrial Spur. From this point, the Montclair–Boonton Line follows the alignment of the Delaware, Lackawanna and Western Railroad's Boonton Branch.

=== Lincoln Park to Mountain Lakes ===
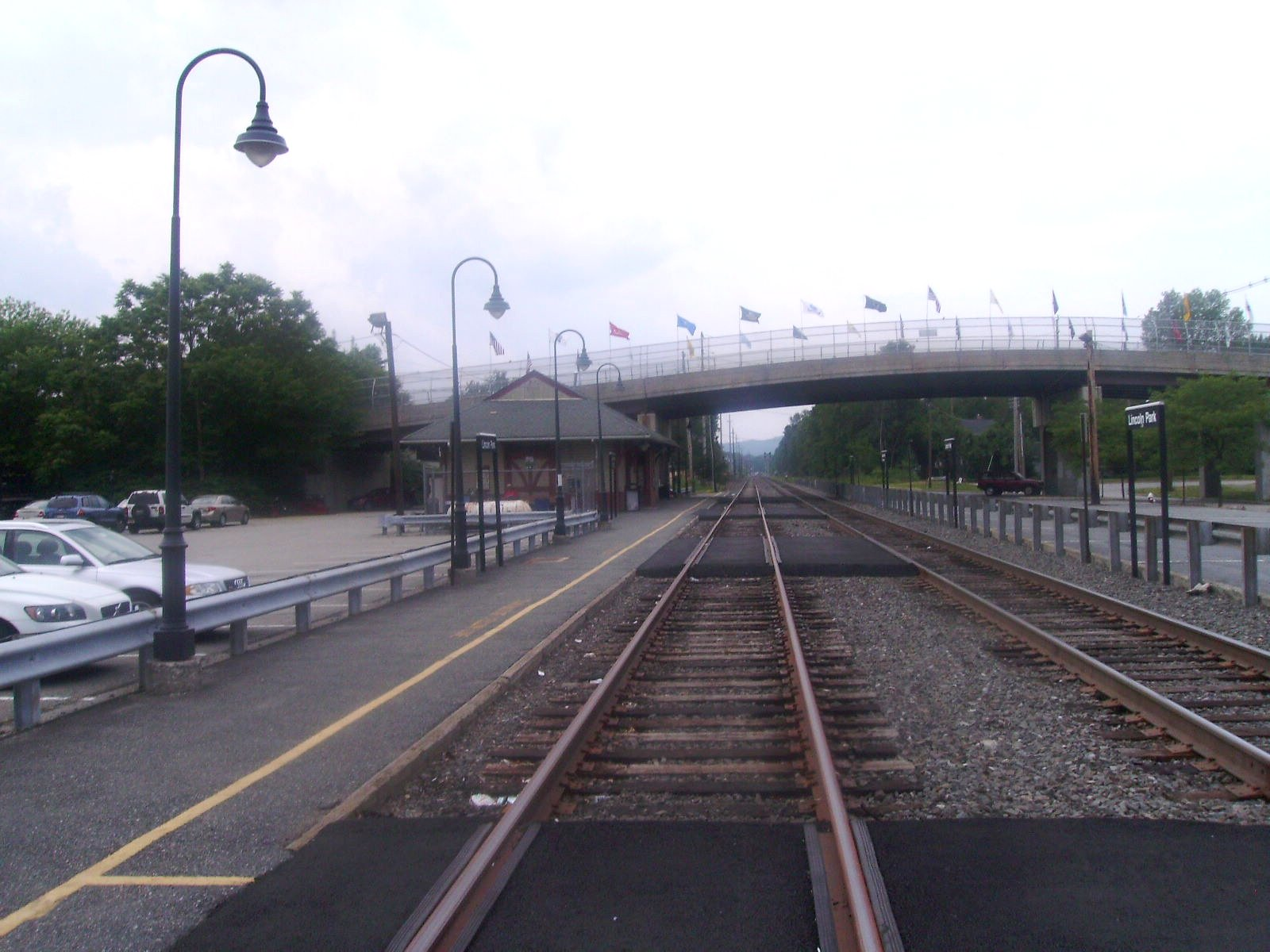
The Lincoln Park station and its lone platform facing westbound heading towards the 1904 station

West-northwest of the curve, the present line is back on the Delaware, Lackawanna and Western's Boonton Branch original alignment. This parallels U.S. Route 202 (the Boonton Turnpike) through Wayne. The alignment crosses the Pequannock River once again, entering Lincoln Park, New Jersey. After crossing under Ryerson Road, the alignment heads westward through an empty portion of Lincoln Park until entering the namesake Lincoln Park station. Lincoln Park station has a low platform and the station building, a Type W-103 station built in 1904. The tracks continue westward, paralleling U.S. Route 202 through Lincoln Park and making a curve into Montville, New Jersey. In Montville, the tracks head to the southwest through the Towaco district. The tracks continue, paralleling and crossing under Route 202 before entering the Towaco station. Towaco's station building was constructed in 1911 and serves as the only station in Montville, with one low platform for the single track.

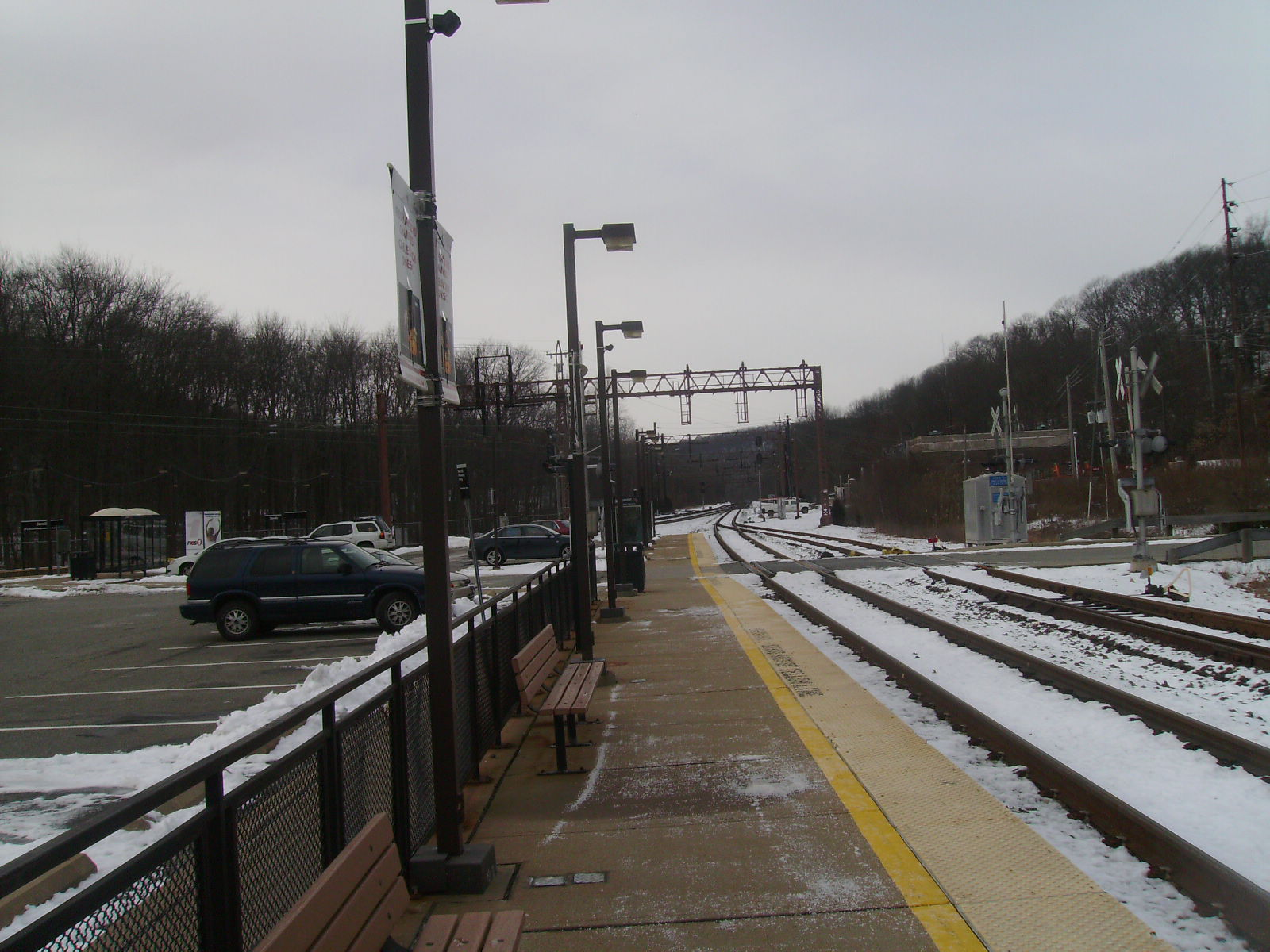
Denville station's Montclair-Boonton specific platform. The Morristown Line platform is visible to the left

The tracks continue westward through Montville, paralleling and crossing U.S. Route 202 once again. Just before the overpass of Interstate 287, the tracks pass the site of the original Montville station. Montville was constructed in 1903 as a Type W-1 frame station and cost only $2400. The tracks cross over Interstate 287 and make a gradual turn to the southwest. There, the line parallels U.S. Route 202 and Interstate 287 south of the Taylortown district until entering Boonton. After crossing Wooton Street, the tracks enter the Boonton station. Boonton station was originally much longer, with the brick and slate station constructed in 1905 as the largest community on the Boonton Line since Paterson. The station currently has a relatively short low platform, brick head-house shelter and a mini-high ADA ramp. After leaving the Boonton station, the tracks continue to the southeast, paralleling Interstate 287 and U.S. Route 202. Just after crossing the Rockaway River the tracks pass the still existing DL&W Freight House and the West Boonton Yard, home of The United Railroad Historical Society of New Jersey. There many antique train cars and locomotives that once ran on these tracks are being restored. The tracks continue out of Boonton and into the Intervale placename. At Intervale, Interstate 287 and U.S. Route 202 turn to the southeast and away from the rail line, which continues southwestward into Mountain Lakes. At the intersection of Midvale Road and Elm Road, the tracks enter the namesake Mountain Lakes station. Mountain Lakes has a single low platform used for train service, while its station building, built in 1912 sits nearby as a restaurant.

=== Denville to Mount Arlington ===
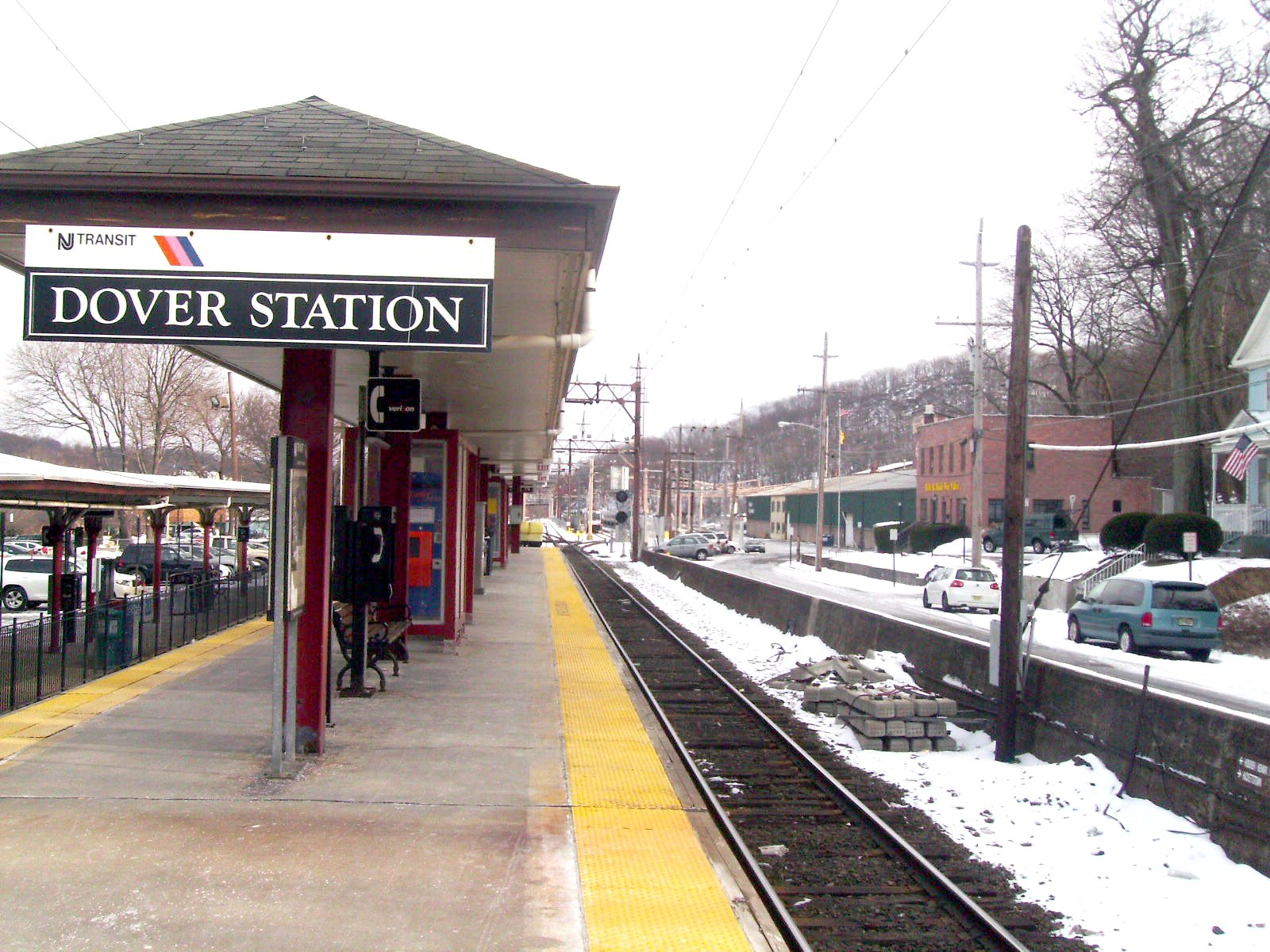
Dover station facing eastward along its island platform

After Mountain Lakes station, the Montclair–Boonton Line continues westward through Mountain Lakes and parallels Pollard Road. The alignment crosses U.S. Route 46 and heads to the northwest along Route 46 through Rainbow Lakes. The line crosses under Interstate 80 and intersecting with the former Delaware, Lackawanna and Western's Rockaway Branch (discontinued in 1948), where the station enters the one platform on the north end of Denville station. The Denville station is built for two lines and has two separate platforms, including one for the Morristown Line, which merges nearby. Denville station had a Type W-3 Delaware, Lackawanna and Western-style wooden frame station built in 1904, which has since been razed. The shell of Denville Tower still stands, and is used as a communications center for New Jersey Transit. After Denville, electrified service begins once again, heading westward across Estling Lake and Franklin Lake before continuing along the Route 46 corridor and into Dover. After Mountain Park, the line crosses through Dover Yard, which is a six storage track station. A short distance after the park and yard, the tracks enter the Dover station. Dover was constructed from 1899 to 1901, opening on November 1, 1901 and was a two side platform station. Current Dover Station still has its building from the Delaware, Lackawanna and Western, but the station's two side platforms have been replaced by a high-level island platform.

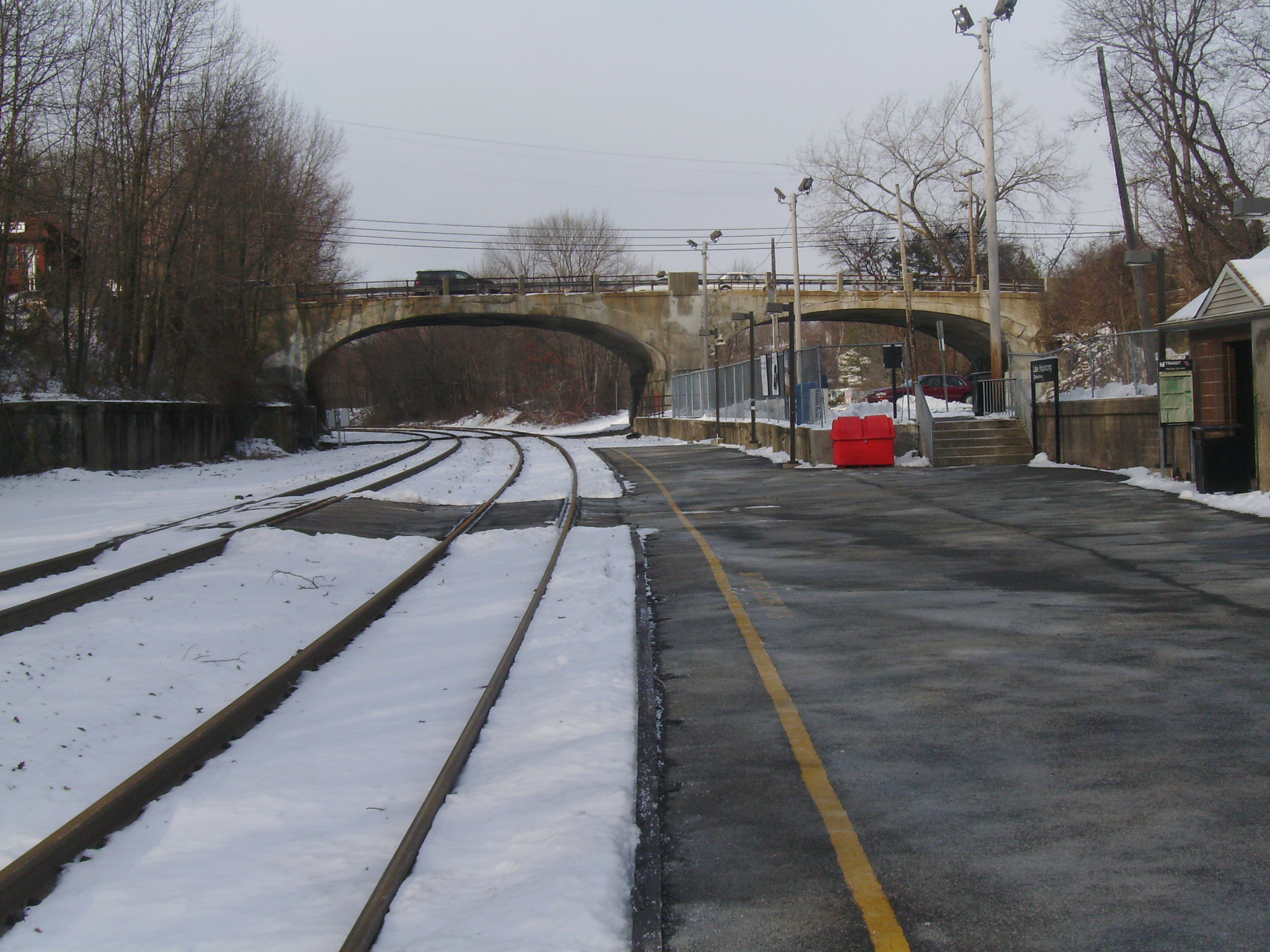
The Lake Hopatcong station facing westward towards Mount Olive

After departing the Dover station, the Morristown Line catenary wires end about a half-mile west, near the US Route 46 overpass. Afterwards, the tracks parallel Dickerson Street before turning to the northwest through Dover until Morris Duffy School before turning westward into Wharton. The tracks then cross the site of the former Delaware, Lackawanna and Western Railroad station in Wharton, built in 1900. The station was a Type W-101A Delaware, Lackawanna and Western-style, back when the town was named Port Oram, but the station was out of service by 1962. After Wharton station, the tracks continue westward, crossing over Berkshire Valley Road (Morris County Route 699) and parallel Interstate 80 through Morris County, entering the Mount Arlington station at Interchange 30. Mount Arlington station is the newest station along the Montclair–Boonton Line, opening on January 21, 2008, nine days after opening of Wayne-Route 23. Mount Arlington has two high-level platforms serving two tracks. The station is also a park & ride, serving bus service from Lakeland Bus and 285 parking spaces.

=== Lake Hopatcong to Hackettstown ===
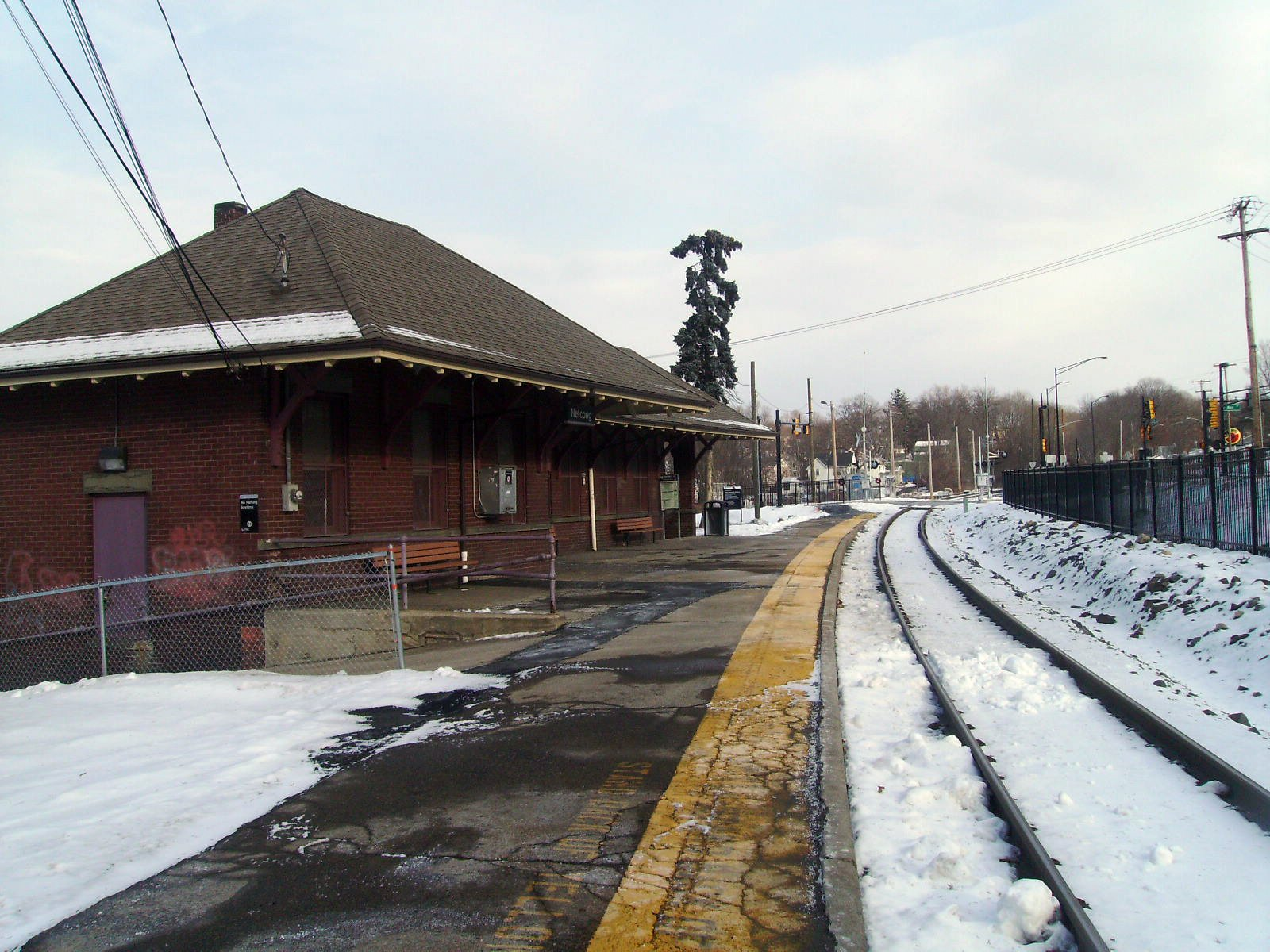
Netcong station heading eastward towards Lake Hopatcong

After paralleling Interstate 80 out of Mount Arlington station, the line heads southwestward until turning northeastward through the community of Landing. From there, the line goes northward along Morris County Route 631 heading into downtown Landing, where the tracks turn northeastward. The tracks soon enter the Lake Hopatcong station. Lake Hopatcong has two low platforms with a shelter on the westbound side. The original Delaware, Lackawanna and Western station was much larger, built in 1911 to replace the original Hopatcong stop. The original station had two large towers and two long concrete platforms to access from the original 1911 station on Landing Road. A short distance later, the tracks cross under the Landing Masonry Bridge (which contains Landing Road/CR 631) and continue westward into Port Morris Junction. At Port Morris Junction, the Montclair–Boonton Line turns to the southwest, while the right-of-way continues westward along as the Lackawanna Cut-Off. The line also passes Port Morris Yard, where the shell of the former junction tower, built in 1909, stands. Continuing to the southwest, the tracks parallel Lake Musconetcong and enter the community of Netcong. After crossing under New Jersey Route 183, the tracks enter downtown Netcong and into the Netcong station. Netcong has a brick house on its one low platform. The station building, built in 1903, used bricks from a location in nearby Port Murray. Netcong Station was also site of the junction to the former Sussex Branch built by the Delaware, Lackawanna and Western, discontinued from Branchville on July 13, 1966.

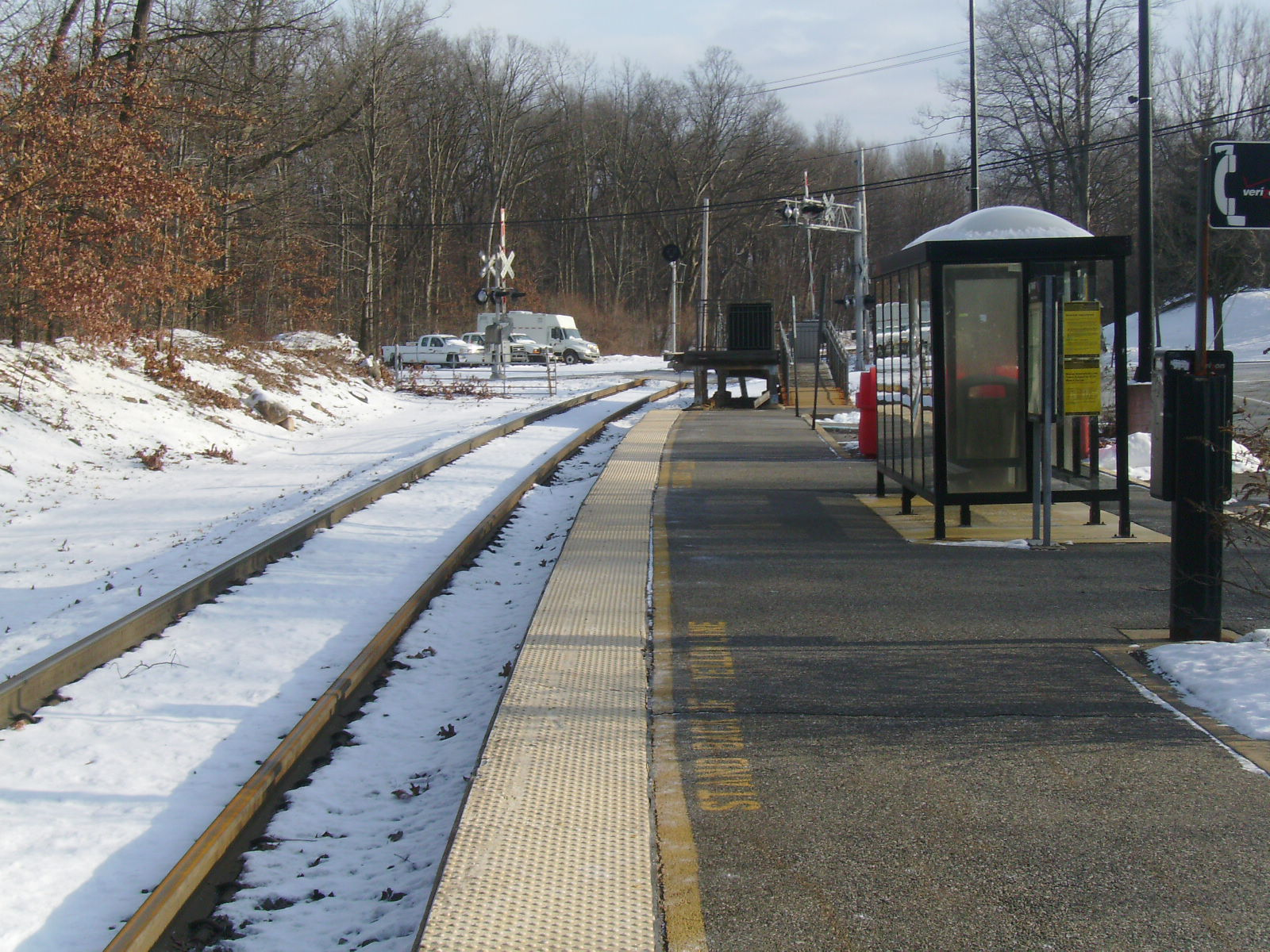
Mount Olive station facing eastward. There is no signage on the platform for the station name

Until late 1994, this was the endpoint of the line, until tracks were rehabilitated to Hackettstown along Norfolk Southern's Washington Secondary. Continuing westward, the tracks continue, paralleling Interstate 80, U.S. Route 206 and Waterloo Valley Road. The tracks soon enter the International Trade Center in Mount Olive. After crossing Waterloo Valley Road the tracks enter Mount Olive station. Mount Olive has one low-level platform and shelter that is a terminus and beginning for a few weekday trains. Mount Olive is near the site of the former Waterloo station, built in 1854 when the connection to the Sussex Railroad was created. The station was canned in 1939, and the shelter that replaced burned in a grass fire in 1946. After Mount Olive, the line follows Waterloo Valley Road through Allamuchy State Park and passing Saxton Lake before turning to the west through Stephens State Park. The line then enters Hackettstown, passing the medical center and the rail spur to the Mars and M&Ms plant. The tracks then cross County Route 517 and U.S. Route 46. After paralleling Valentine Street, the tracks enter Hackettstown station, with one low platform and a mini-high ADA ramp. Hackettstown Station had a station building, built in 1868 as a Type W-2 Delaware, Lackawanna and Western-style frame building; it was demolished in the late 1960s. Trackage south of Hackettstown is owned by Norfolk Southern and operated by the Dover and Delaware River Railroad as part of the Washington Secondary to Phillipsburg.

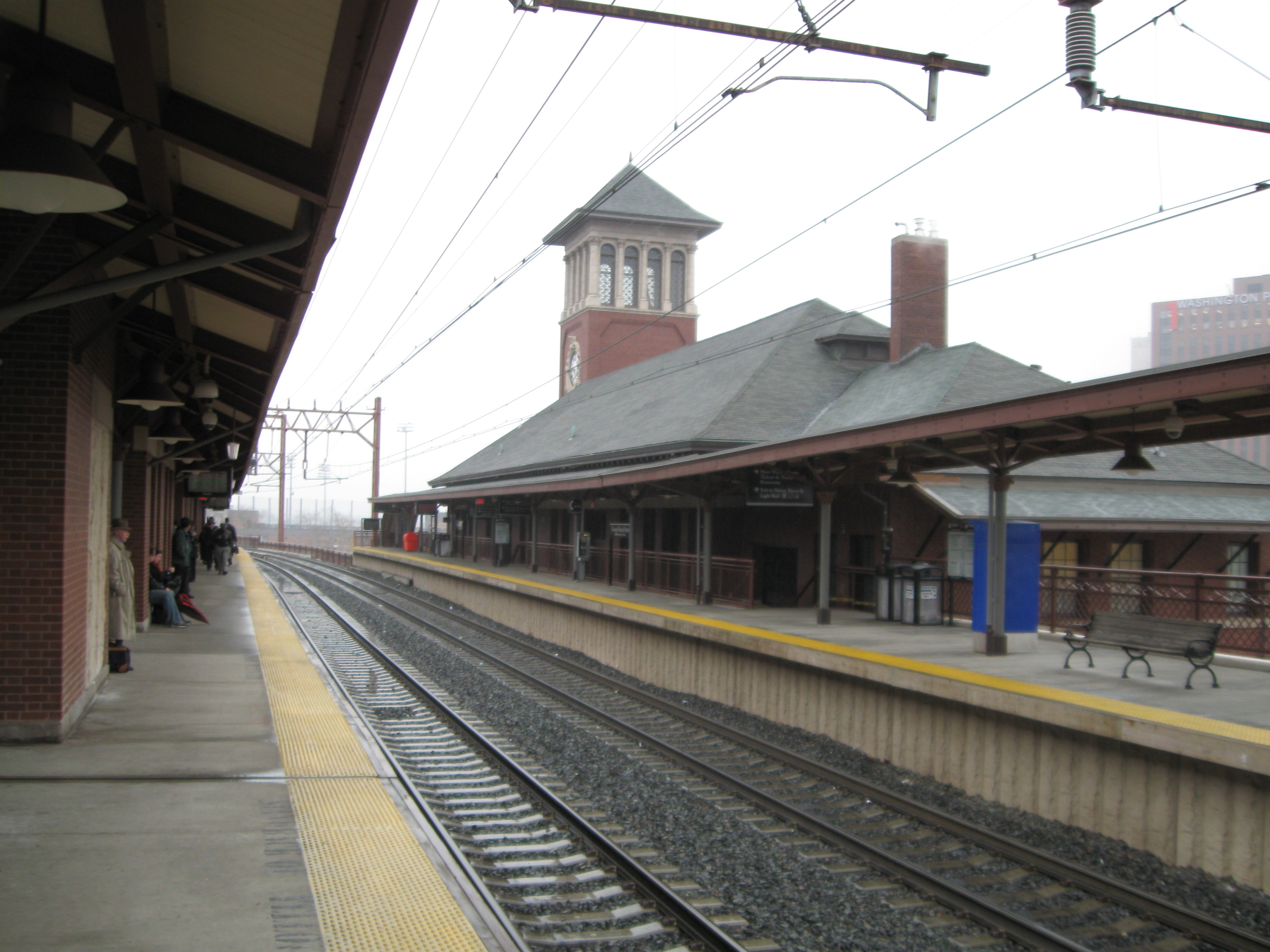
Newark Broad Street after its rebuilding

== Service ==
The Montclair–Boonton Line is serviced on weekdays between 5:00 a.m. and 11:15 p.m. Between Hackettstown and Denville, there is also service which, after Denville, continues to Hoboken via the Morristown Line. Frequency of service reflects the times at which commuters tend to travel; inbound trains are more frequent in the morning, and outbound trains are more frequent in the afternoon and evening. From Denville to Montclair, only diesel-hauled trains can provide service, as the territory is not electrified. Therefore, there is no direct service to/from New York between Mountain Lakes and Little Falls stations. The same is true for all stations between and including Hackettstown and Mount Arlington, as New York Penn Station normally does not allow diesel trains to enter. Electrified service west of Montclair State University, therefore, only serves Denville and Dover stations via the Morristown Line, along with the stretches in between. On weekends, 9.5 round trips between Hoboken and Bay Street operate every two hours.

== Electrification ==
The original 1930 Lackawanna 3 kV DC electrification was converted in 1984 to 25 kV 60 Hz, as part of the re-electrification of the Morris & Essex Lines which the then-Montclair Branch was grouped with at the time. The 2002 extension of electrification to Great Notch together with the Montclair Connection is similar in construction, except that hot-dip galvanized steel poles are used; many of these poles are painted dark green for aesthetic reasons, in contrast with the old Lackawanna poles which are painted dark red. Catenary construction is uniform throughout; compound (3-wire) with a zigzag horizontal profile, but without self-tensioning, just like on most sections of the M&E lines.

The line features a single autotransformer substation at Montclair, close to Bay Street station, dating from the 1984 re-electrification. Its power is normally supplied from NJT's Meadows Substation on the M&E (Morristown) mainline.

== Rolling stock ==
Montclair–Boonton Line trains use several types of rolling stock but while Midtown Direct trains use either ALP-46 or ALP-45DP locomotives with trains consisting or either Multilevel or Comet II & IV cars with a single Comet V car, trains running to Hackettstown and points beyond MSU use diesel locomotives which not only include F40PH and GP40PH-2 locomotives from either NJ-transit or Metro North, but PL42ACs along with a few ALP-45s. Arrow IIIs are also utilized on the line too but they are only used on trains between Hoboken and MSU only while oftentimes trains between Hoboken and MSU might also use ALP-46s too. This type of rolling stock is also used on both the Morristown Line and Gladstone Branch.

== Stations ==
State	Zone	Location	Station	Miles (km)	Date opened	Date closed	Connections / notes
NY	1	Manhattan	Pennsylvania Station	0.0 (0.0)	1910		Amtrak (long distance): Cardinal, Crescent, Lake Shore Limited, Palmetto, Silver Meteor; Amtrak (intercity): Acela, Adirondack, Carolinian, Empire Service, Ethan Allen Express, Keystone Service, Maple Leaf, Northeast Regional, Pennsylvanian, Vermonter; Long Island Rail Road: Babylon, Belmont Park, City Terminal Zone, Far Rockaway, Hempstead, Long Beach, Montauk, Oyster Bay, Port Jefferson, Port Washington, Ronkonkoma, West Hempstead branches NJ Transit Rail: Gladstone, Morristown, Northeast Corridor, Raritan Valley, North Jersey Coast lines New York City Subway: 1, 2, and 3 (at 34th Street – Penn Station (Seventh Avenue)), A, C, and E (at 34th Street – Penn Station (Eighth Avenue)); New York City Bus: M7, M20, M34 SBS, M34A, Q32; Academy Bus: SIM23, SIM24; Flixbus: Eastern Shuttle; Vamoose Bus
NJ	1	Secaucus	Secaucus Junction	3.5 (5.6)	December 15, 2003		NJ Transit Rail: Bergen County, Gladstone, Main, Meadowlands, Morristown, Northeast Corridor, Pascack Valley, Raritan Valley, and North Jersey Coast lines Metro-North Railroad: Port Jervis Line; NJ Transit Bus: 2, 78, 129, 329, 353
NJ	1	Hoboken	Hoboken Terminal	–	1903		NJ Transit Rail: Bergen County, Gladstone, Main, Meadowlands, Morristown, Pascack Valley, Raritan Valley, and North Jersey Coast lines Metro-North Railroad: Port Jervis Line; Hudson-Bergen Light Rail: 8th Street-Hoboken, Hoboken-Tonnelle; PATH: HOB-WTC, HOB-33, JSQ-33 (via HOB); NJ Transit Bus: 22, 22X, 23, 68, 85, 87, 89, 126; New York Waterway
NJ	1	Harrison	Harrison	7.1 (11.5)	1937	September 16, 1984	
NJ	1	Newark	Newark Broad Street	10.4 (16.7)	November 19, 1836		NJ Transit Rail: Morristown Line, Gladstone Branch; Newark Light Rail: Broad Street – Newark Penn; NJ Transit Bus: 11, 13, 27, 28, go28, 29, 30, 41, 72, 76, 78, 108
NJ	4	Newark					
NJ	4	East Orange	Roseville Avenue		December 18, 1855	September 16, 1984	
NJ	4	East Orange	Ampere		April 24, 1893	April 7, 1991	
NJ	4	Bloomfield	Watsessing Avenue		December 18, 1855		NJ Transit Bus: 94 Originally Doddtown
NJ	4	Bloomfield	Bloomfield		December 18, 1855		NJ Transit Bus: 11, 28, go28, 29, 34, 72, 92, 93, 94, 709
NJ	4	Glen Ridge	Glen Ridge		1860		NJ Transit Bus: 11, 28, 29
NJ	5	Montclair	Bay Street		March 2, 1981		NJ Transit Bus: 11, 28, 29 Western terminus on weekends
NJ	5	Montclair	Walnut Street		January 1, 1873		
NJ	5	Montclair	Watchung Avenue		January 1, 1873		NJ Transit Bus: 28
NJ	5	Montclair	Upper Montclair		January 1, 1873		NJ Transit Bus: 28, 101
NJ	6	Montclair	Mountain Avenue		January 1, 1873		NJ Transit Bus: 28
NJ	6	Montclair	Montclair Heights		January 1, 1873		NJ Transit Bus: 28, 191, 705
NJ	6	Little Falls	Montclair State University at Little Falls		October 20, 2004		Montclair State University Shuttle Terminus of electrification
NJ	6	Little Falls	Great Notch		January 1, 1873	January 17, 2010	Former split for Caldwell Branch to Essex Fells
NJ	8	Little Falls	Little Falls		January 1, 1873		NJ Transit Bus: 11, 191, 704, 705
NJ	8	Little Falls	Singac				
NJ	9	Wayne	Wayne Route 23 Transit Center		January 12, 2008		NJ Transit Bus: 194, 198, 324, 748
NJ	9	Wayne	Mountain View–Wayne		January 1, 1873		NJ Transit Bus: 871 Site of split for former New York & Greenwood Lake Railway to Wanaque–Midvale
NJ	10	Lincoln Park	Lincoln Park		December 14, 1870		NJ Transit Bus: 871; Lakeland Bus: 46
NJ	11	Montville	Towaco		December 14, 1870		NJ Transit Bus: 871; Lakeland Bus: 46
NJ	11	Montville	Montville		December 14, 1870		
NJ	14	Boonton	Boonton		September 5, 1867		NJ Transit Bus: 871; Lakeland Bus: 46
NJ	14	Mountain Lakes	Mountain Lakes		November 10, 1912		
NJ	14	Denville	Denville	39.3 (63.2)	July 4, 1848		NJ Transit Rail: Morristown Line; NJ Transit Bus: 880
NJ	17	Dover	Dover	43.1 (69.4)	July 31, 1848		NJ Transit Rail: Morristown Line; NJ Transit Bus: 872, 875, 880 Terminus of electrification, transfer point between trains to New York/Hoboken and Dover
NJ	17	Wharton	Wharton			January 6, 1958	
NJ	19						
NJ	19	Mount Arlington	Mount Arlington		January 16, 1854 January 21, 2008	November 8, 1942	NJ Transit Rail: Morristown Line; Lakeland Bus: 80 Also known as Howard Boulevard Park and Ride
NJ	19	Roxbury	Lake Hopatcong	48.5 (78.1)	1882		NJ Transit Rail: Morristown Line; Lakeland Bus: 80
NJ	19	Roxbury	Port Morris			April 24, 1949	Passenger service ended on April 24, 1949, but the site continued to serve as split of the Lackawanna Cut-Off.
NJ	19	Netcong	Netcong	51.0 (82.1)	January 16, 1854		NJ Transit Rail: Morristown Line Former western terminus, originally Netcong–Stanhope
NJ	19	Mount Olive	Mount Olive	52.7 (84.8)	January 16, 1854 October 31, 1994	April 24, 1960	NJ Transit Rail: Morristown Line Originally Waterloo
NJ	19	Hackettstown	Hackettstown	60.0 (96.6)	January 16, 1854 October 31, 1994	September 30, 1966	NJ Transit Rail: Morristown Line
