= Hackettstown station =

Train station in Hackettstown, New Jersey, US

Hackettstown
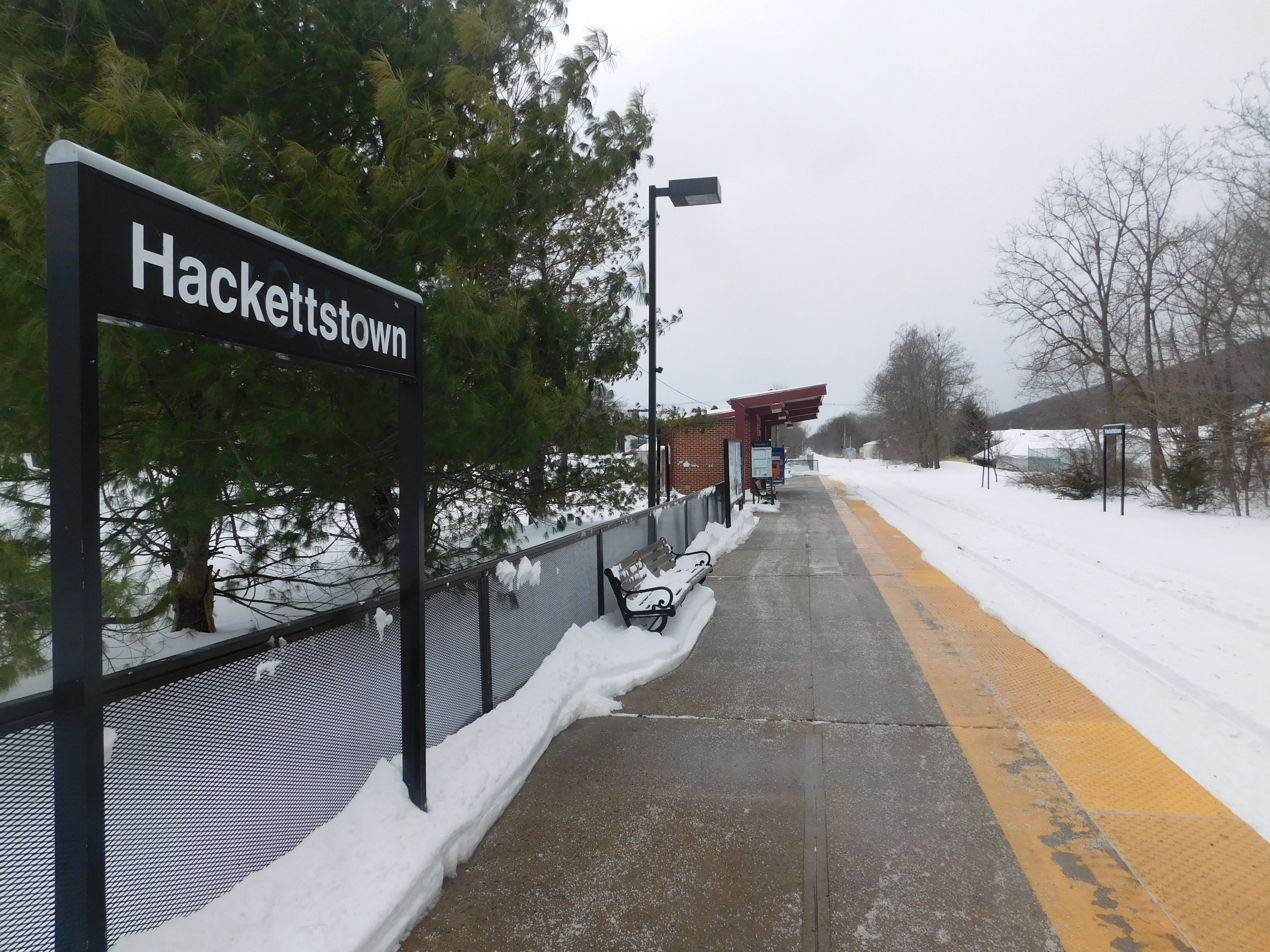
- Hackettstown station in March 2017

General information
- Location: Valentine Street and Beatty Streets, Hackettstown, New Jersey
- Coordinates: 40°51′07″N 74°50′05″W
- Owner: New Jersey Transit
- Lines: Morristown Line; Washington Secondary
- Platforms: 1 side platform
- Tracks: 1

Construction
- Parking: Hourly and reserved
- Accessible: yes

Other information
- Fare zone: 19

History
- Opened: January 16, 1854 (Morris and Essex Railroad); October 31, 1994 (NJ Transit)
- Closed: September 30, 1966
- Rebuilt: 1868

Passengers
- 2025: 59 (average weekday)
- Rank: 136 of 153

Services
Preceding station	NJ Transit	Following station
Terminus	Montclair–Boonton Line limited service	Mount Olive toward New York or Hoboken
Terminus	Morristown Line limited service	Mount Olive toward New York or Hoboken
Former services
Preceding station	Delaware, Lackawanna and Western Railroad	Following station
Port Murray toward Portland or Phillipsburg	Old Main Line	Mount Olive toward Lake Hopatcong
Location

Hackettstown station is an active commuter railroad station in the town of Hackettstown, Warren County, New Jersey. Located at the intersection of Valentine Street and Beatty Street, the station serves as the western terminus for NJ Transit's Morristown Line and Montclair–Boonton Line for most trains that operate west of Dover. The station consists of a single low-level side platform with shelter and a partial high-level platform handicap accessibility. Hackettstown station also has a 103-space parking lot owned by NJ Transit free for use.

Railroad service in Hackettstown began on January 16, 1854 with the extension of the Morris and Essex Railroad to Hackettstown. Service in Hackettstown continued until September 30, 1966 when service to Washington was discontinued west of Netcong–Stanhope by the Erie Lackawanna Railroad as part of greater service cuts. NJ Transit revived service on October 31, 1994 with an extension to Hackettstown, opening a station at Mount Olive in the process.

== History ==
Originally, the Delaware, Lackawanna and Western Railroad (DL&W) served Hackettstown with a large station in downtown Hackettstown for its Old Main alignment. The large wooden station was a Type W-2 station (from DL&W railroad documents) built in 1868. Hackettstown station was razed in the late 1960s after passenger service on most Erie-Lackawanna Railroad branches terminated in October 1966.

Service west of Netcong station began on October 31, 1994, with an extension of the Boonton Line westward along Conrail's Washington Secondary. The station was opened along with Mount Olive station near Waterloo Village and the International Trade Center in the namesake township.

In 2023, NJ Transit purchased the Washington Secondary track from Netcong station to Hackettstown. Norfolk Southern retained an exclusive freight easement.
