= Mount Olive station =

NJ Transit rail station

Mt. Olive
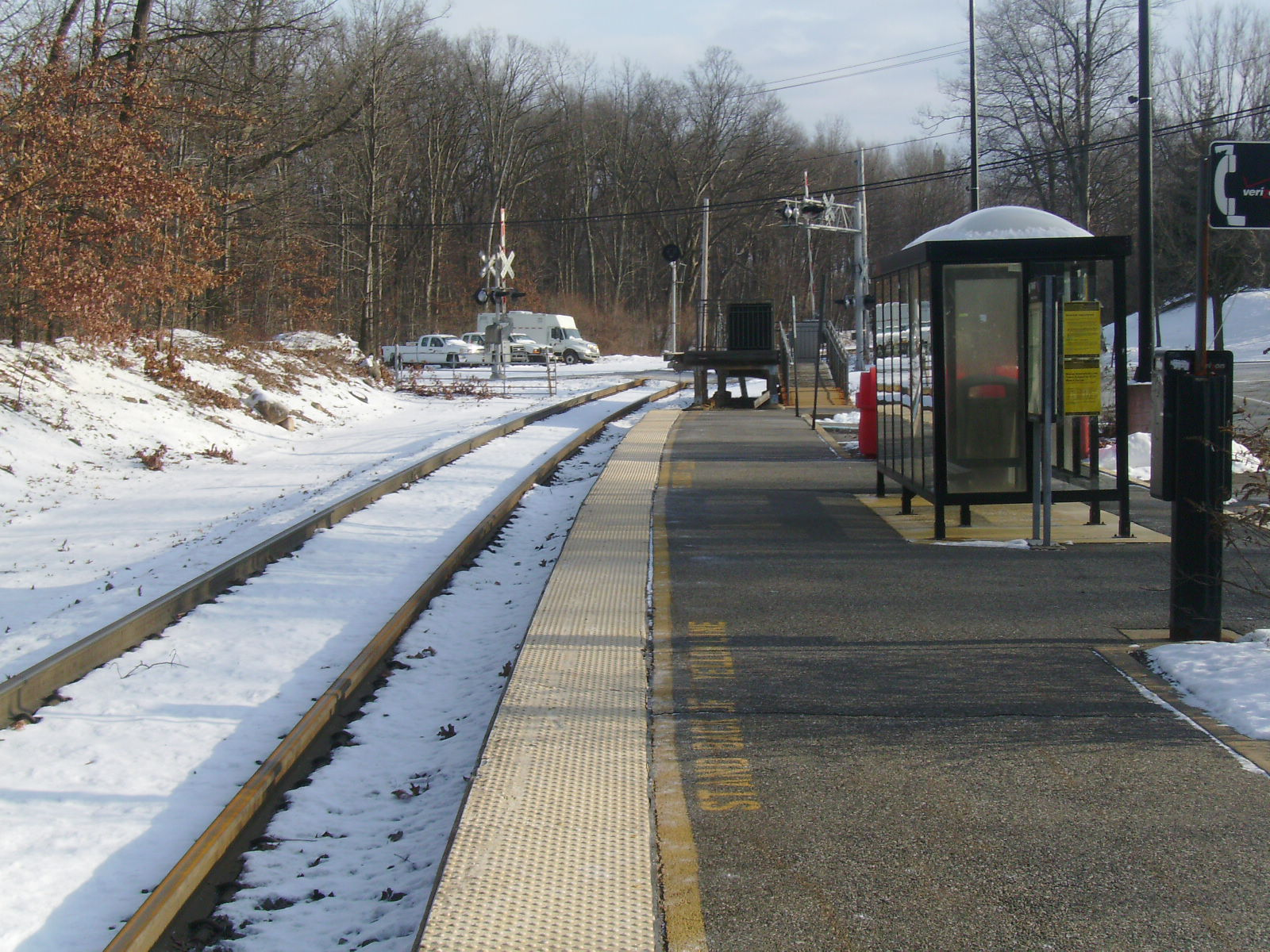
- Mount Olive station facing to the east and Netcong station. There is no signage denoting the station other than the singular sign on Waterloo Valley Road.

General information
- Location: Waterloo Valley Road, Budd Lake, New Jersey 07828
- Coordinates: 40°54′26.7″N 74°43′50.8″W
- Owner: New Jersey Transit (station and trackage)
- Line: Morristown Line
- Platforms: 1 side platform
- Tracks: 1

Construction
- Parking: 23 parking spaces

Other information
- Fare zone: 19

History
- Opened: January 16, 1854 (Morris and Essex Railroad); October 31, 1994 (NJ Transit)
- Closed: April 24, 1960
- Former names: Waterloo

Passengers
- 2025: 13 (average weekday)
- Rank: 151 of 153

Services
Preceding station	NJ Transit	Following station
Hackettstown Terminus	Montclair–Boonton Line limited service	Netcong toward New York or Hoboken
Hackettstown Terminus	Morristown Line limited service	Netcong toward New York or Hoboken
Former services
Preceding station	Delaware, Lackawanna and Western Railroad	Following station
Hackettstown toward Portland or Phillipsburg	Old Main Line	Netcong toward Lake Hopatcong
Cranberry Lake toward Branchville	Sussex Branch	Netcong toward Hoboken
Location

Mount Olive is an NJ Transit station in Mount Olive, New Jersey, located in the International Trade Center. The station, located on the side of Waterloo Valley Road, services trains for both the Montclair–Boonton Line and the Morristown Line along trackage owned by Norfolk Southern. The line is not electrified from Hackettstown to Dover, where passengers can transfer to an electric Morristown Line train via Summit or a diesel Montclair-Boonton train via Wayne and Montclair. Trains along both lines head to Hoboken Terminal in Hoboken, New Jersey or New York Penn Station at 34th Street in New York City, although Montclair-Boonton trains require a transfer at Montclair State University or Newark Broad Street for electrified service to New York. It is also the least-used station in the NJ Transit commuter rail network.

== History ==
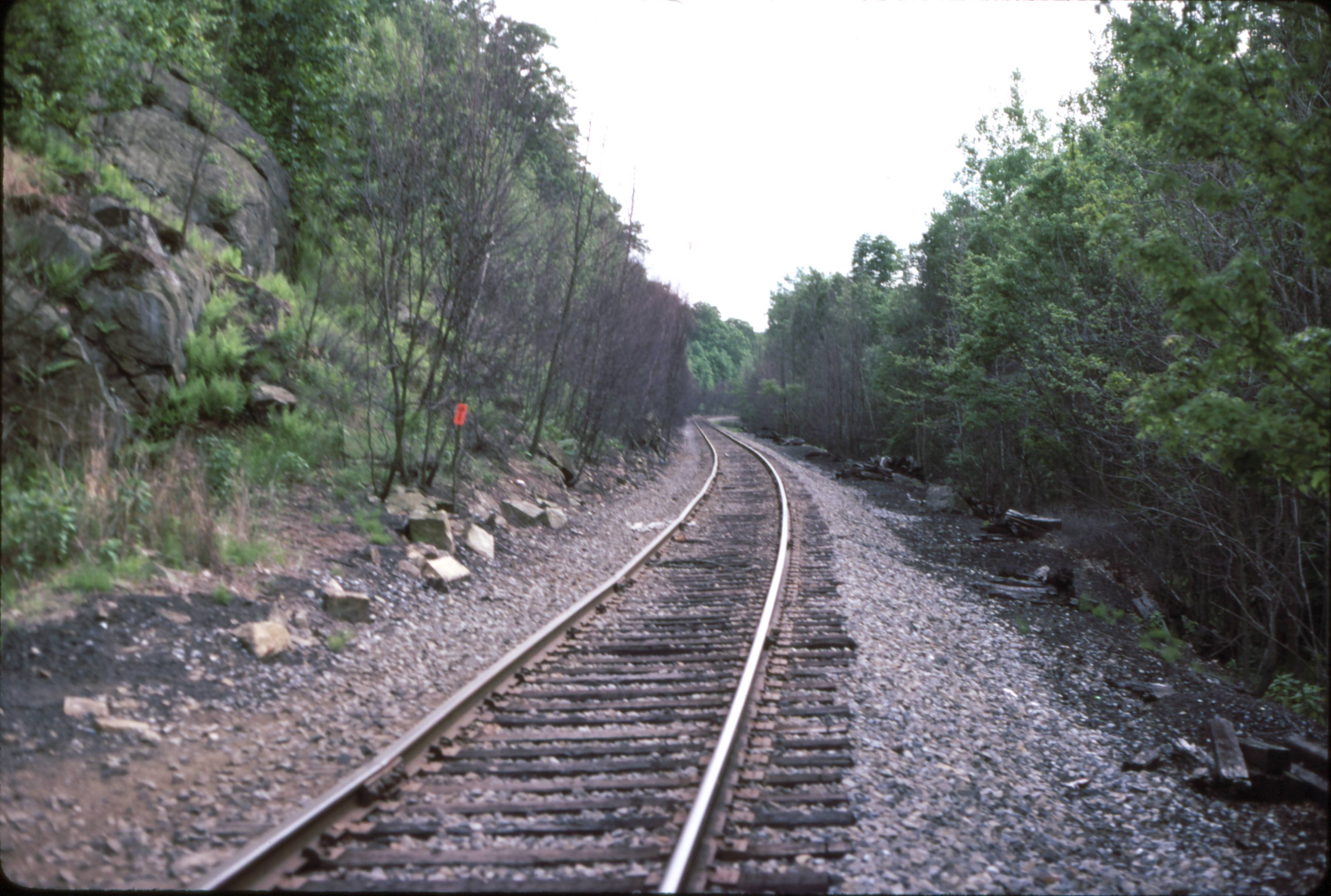
The Delaware, Lackawanna and Western Railroad Waterloo station site, 2008

After the termination of Boonton Line passenger service to Washington in 1966, service terminated at Netcong station in Netcong. In 1994, stations were constructed along Conrail's Washington Secondary at Mount Olive and Hackettstown, extending the line into Warren County and providing rail service to the International Trade Center (ITC) along with tourist attraction, Waterloo Village. Service took effect on November 5, 1994 from Netcong to Hackettstown. The Washington Secondary was the original alignment of the Delaware, Lackawanna and Western Railroad's Main Line via Washington and Portland, Pennsylvania. Near Mount Olive station was once the Waterloo station, named after local Waterloo, New Jersey. Waterloo station was first built in 1854 and remained in service until being torn down in the 1920s. It continued to receive passengers, and was the only regular stop with neither a building nor even a shelter.

== Station layout ==
Mount Olive has one track and one mini-high side platform.

== See also ==
- Sussex Railroad

== Bibliography ==
- New Jersey Comptroller of the Treasury (1856). Annual Statements of the Railroad and Canal Companies of the State of New Jersey. Trenton, New Jersey: Office of "True American".
