= Netcong station =

NJ Transit rail station

Netcong
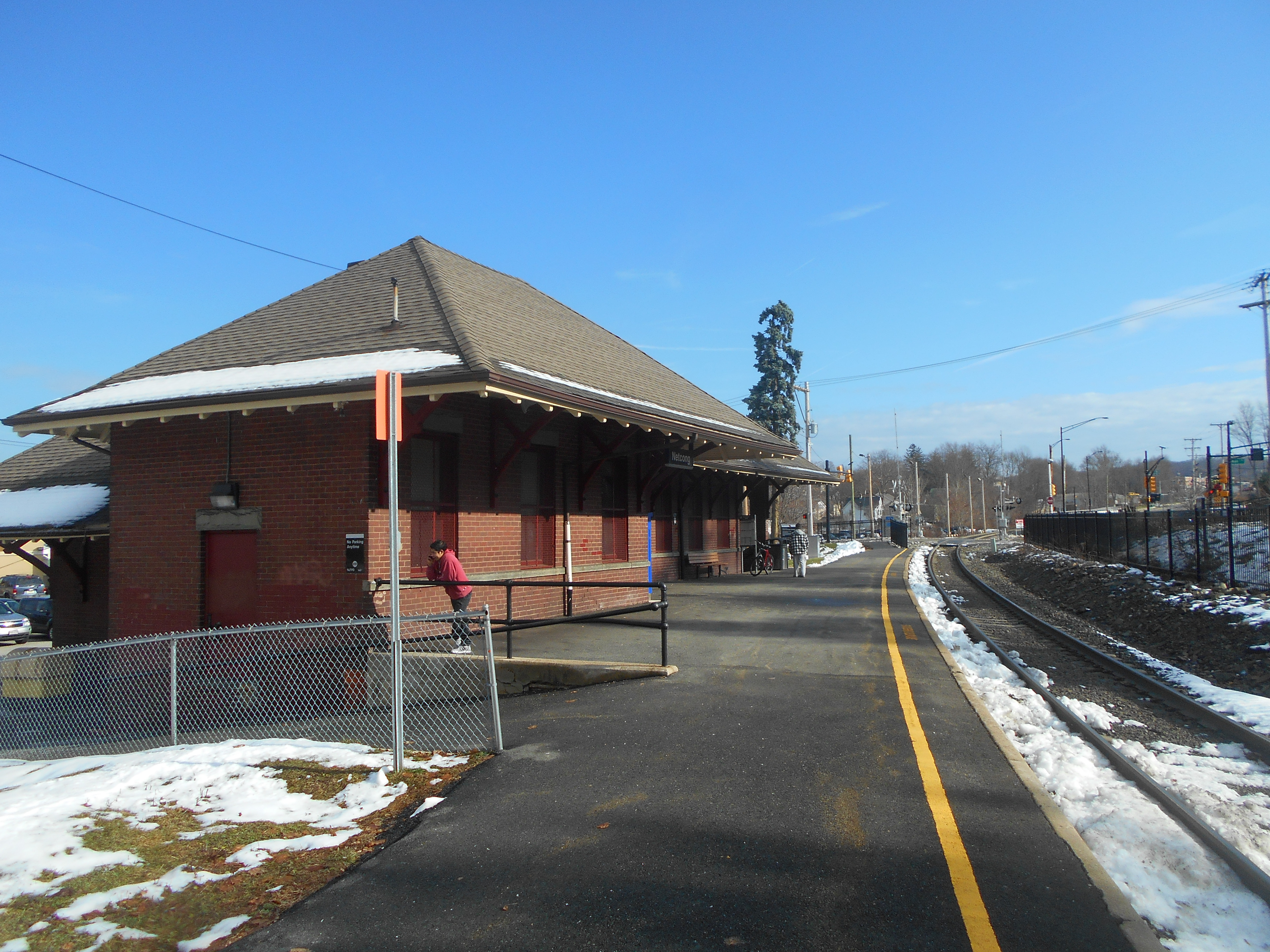
- Netcong station in December 2014 from the station platform. Route 46 is visible to the right.

General information
- Location: Main Street at U.S. Route 46, Netcong, New Jersey
- Coordinates: 40°53′51.5″N 74°42′26.5″W
- Owner: NJ Transit
- Platforms: 1 side platform
- Tracks: 1
- Connections: Lakeland: 80

Construction
- Parking: Free and no overnight parking

Other information
- Station code: 902 (Delaware, Lackawanna and Western)
- Fare zone: 19

History
- Opened: January 16, 1854
- Rebuilt: 1901–June 14, 1903
- Former names: South Stanhope; Netcong–Stanhope

Passengers
- 2025: 46 (average weekday)
- Rank: 141 of 153

Services
Preceding station	NJ Transit	Following station
Mount Olive toward Hackettstown	Montclair–Boonton Line limited service	Lake Hopatcong toward New York or Hoboken
Mount Olive toward Hackettstown	Morristown Line limited service	Lake Hopatcong toward New York or Hoboken
Former services
Preceding station	Delaware, Lackawanna and Western Railroad	Following station
Waterloo toward Portland or Phillipsburg	Old Main Line	Lake Hopatcong Terminus
Waterloo toward Branchville	Sussex Branch	Hoboken Terminus
Location

Netcong is an NJ Transit station in Netcong, in Morris County, New Jersey, United States. Located on U.S. Route 46 at Main Street in downtown Netcong, the small, 1-low level side platform station service passengers for the Morristown Line and the Montclair–Boonton Line. These lines provide service to Hoboken or to New York City via Midtown Direct on the Morristown Line at Dover station and Montclair-Boonton at Montclair State University station. Midtown Direct service can also be transferred at Newark Broad Street station in Newark. There is one track and one platform on the north side, adjacent to the station. NJ Transit maintains a substantial train servicing yard east of the Netcong station at Port Morris in Roxbury Township. Port Morris Yard is proposed to return as the junction of the Montclair–Boonton and Morristown lines for the Lackawanna Cut-Off line to the Lackawanna Transit Center in Scranton, Pennsylvania. Transfers would be provided at Lake Hopatcong station in Landing.

== History ==
Service to Netcong, once known as South Stanhope, began on January 16, 1854 by the Morris & Essex Railroad. A 1.5-story depot was constructed by the railroad out of wood and located on the westbound tracks. The current Netcong station was built by the Delaware, Lackawanna and Western Railroad's main line after construction of the Stanhope Cut-Off from 1901–1903 as the main station to Netcong and nearby Stanhope. The brick design of the station was built with bricks from nearby Port Murray.

The station served as the junction of the Sussex Branch of the Delaware, Lackawanna and Western as well, serving towns through Sussex County including Branchville, Newton and Lafayette Township. Passenger railroad service on the Sussex Branch ended in October 1966, when the Erie-Lackawanna Railroad, the successor to the Lackawanna, cut service on many passenger branches. In 1979, the line was torn up and handed over to the New Jersey Division of Parks and Forestry. Prior to 1994, NJ Transit's service on the then-Boonton Line terminated at Netcong. However, in late 1994, service was extended along the Norfolk Southern owned tracks to Mount Olive Township and Hackettstown, which became the permanent western terminus of the line.

== Station layout ==
Netcong has one low-level asphalt side platform.

== Bibliography ==
- New Jersey Comptroller of the Treasury (1856). Annual Statements of the Railroad and Canal Companies of the State of New Jersey. Trenton, New Jersey: Office of "True American".
- Rutan, Dave (2013). Remember The Sussex Branch of the Lackawanna Railroad. Sussex County, New Jersey: Dave Rutan. ISBN 9781304169310.
