= Freeman Parkway Bridge =

Coordinates: 40.80250°N 74.20691°W

The Freeman Parkway Bridge is a deck arch bridge located in Glen Ridge, New Jersey. The bridge crosses over Toney's Brook and the Montclair-Boonton Line, a train line which runs to New York City and Hoboken.

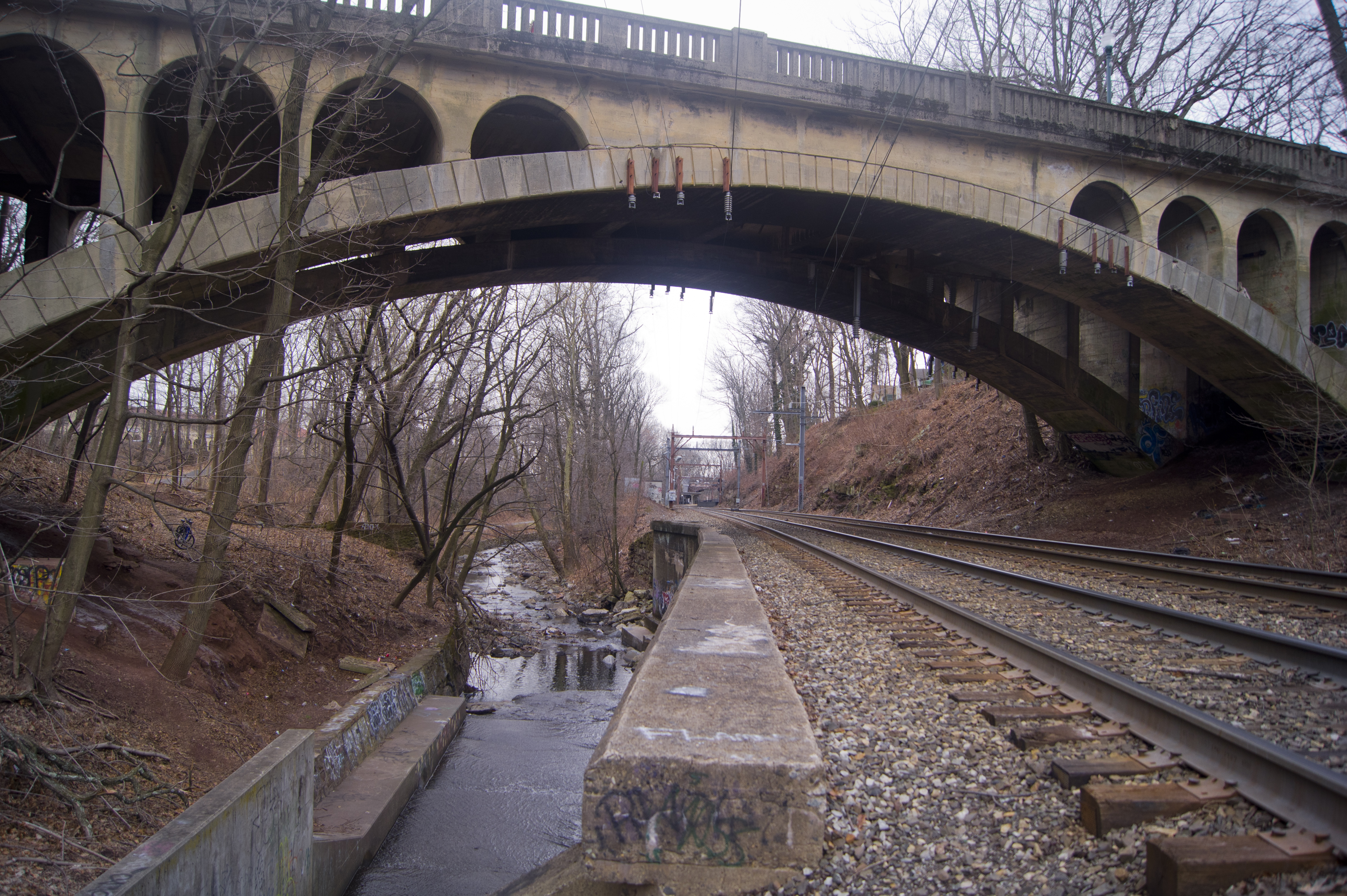
The Freeman Parkway Bridge, Toney's Brook, and the Montclair-Boonton Line.

== Statistics ==
The bridge itself is made of concrete and its one span is 149.9 feet long. It was built in 1926 and is open to street traffic. Freeman Parkway is a short street, and its name changes to Highland Avenue a few hundred feet north of the bridge.

== Death of Jeremy Duncker ==
In October 2012, 18-year-old Jeremy Duncker, a senior at Glen Ridge High School, was found underneath the bridge, near the railroad tracks. An autopsy determined that the cause of death was accidental.
