= International Trade Center (New Jersey) =

Multi-acre office park in Mount Olive, New Jersey

Coordinates: 40.897143°N 74.721765°W

The International Trade Center is a multi-acre office park in Mount Olive, New Jersey. Formerly the site of BASF until 2004, it is currently home to facilities of L3 Technologies, Bosal USA, Coherent Advanced Crystal Group, Vistar, and Robertet, among others. A Residence Inn by Marriott and Mount Olive station are on the grounds. The Center is designated as a foreign trade zone by the State of New Jersey. The International Trade Center was developed by New Jersey Foreign Trade Zone Venture, a joint venture between Rockefeller Group Real Estate & CJ Follini on behalf of Edenwald FTZ Development, one of the companies of the Follini family office. The development has recently been valued at over $975 million.
