= Bloomfield =

Bloomfield may refer to:

== People ==
- Bloomfield (surname)

== Places ==
=== Australia ===
- Bloomfield, Queensland, a town and locality in the Shires of Cook and Douglas
- Bloomfield River, in Queensland

=== Canada ===
- Bloomfield, Carleton County, New Brunswick
- Bloomfield, Kings County, New Brunswick
- Bloomfield, Newfoundland and Labrador
- Bloomfield, Ontario
- Bloomfield, Prince Edward Island
  - Bloomfield Provincial Park

=== Israel ===
Bloomfield Stadium

=== United Kingdom ===
- Bloomfield (Bangor suburb), Northern Ireland
- Bloomfield, Belfast, an electoral ward of East Belfast, Northern Ireland
- Three locations in England

=== United States ===
- Bloomfield, Arkansas, in Benton County
- Bloomfield, California
- North Bloomfield, California, former name Bloomfield
- Bloomfield, Connecticut
- Bloomfield (St. Georges, Delaware), a historic home listed on the National Register of Historic Places
- Bloomfield, Indiana, a town in Greene County
- Bloomfield, Jay County, Indiana, an unincorporated community
- Bloomfield, Spencer County, Indiana, an unincorporated community
- Bloomfield, Iowa
- Bloomfield, Kentucky
- Sharpsburg, Kentucky, formerly known as Bloomfield
- Bloomfield, Missouri
- Bloomfield, Montana
- Bloomfield, Nebraska
- Bloomfield, New Jersey
  - Bloomfield College
  - Bloomfield (NJT station), a New Jersey Transit station
- Bloomfield, New Mexico
- Bloomfield, New York, a village in Ontario County
- Bloomfield, Staten Island, New York
- Bloomfield, Morrow County, Ohio, an unincorporated community
- Bloomfield, Muskingum County, Ohio, an unincorporated community
- Bloomfield, Washington County, Ohio, an unincorporated community
- Bloomfield, Pennsylvania, a borough in Perry County
- Bloomfield (Pittsburgh), Pennsylvania
- Bloomfield, Vermont
- Bloomfield, Virginia
- Bloomfield (Herndon, Virginia), also known as Holly Knoll, a historic home located in Fairfax County
- Bloomfield (village), Wisconsin, in Walworth County
- Bloomfield, Walworth County, Wisconsin, a town
- Bloomfield, Waushara County, Wisconsin, a town
- Bloomfield Hills, Michigan
- Bloomfield Township (disambiguation), several townships
- East Bloomfield, New York
- New Bloomfield, Missouri
- North Bloomfield, California
- North Bloomfield, Ohio
- South Bloomfield, Ohio
- West Bloomfield, New York
- West Bloomfield Township, Michigan

== Sports ==
- Bloomfield Stadium, a football (soccer) stadium in Tel Aviv, Israel
- Bloomfield Road, a football (soccer) stadium in Blackpool, England
- Bloomfield Cricket and Athletic Club, a major cricket team in Colombo, Sri Lanka
- Bloomfield Football Club, a football (soccer) club in Belfast, Northern Ireland

== Coal mines ==
- Bloomfield Colliery, in Tipton, England, site of a Watt steam engine
- Bloomfield, a coal mine in Australia operated by Bloomfield Collieries; See Coal companies of Australia

== Other uses ==
- Bloomfield (microprocessor), a processor marketed under the Intel Core i7 name
- Bloomfield (film), a 1971 film
- Bloomfield Academy (Oklahoma), a school in the Chickasaw Nation, (Indian Territory), near the present town of Achille, Oklahoma
- The Bloomfields (Filipino band)
- The Bloomfields, an English band

== See also ==
- Bloomfield High School (disambiguation)
- Blumenfeld, a surname
- Blumfeld, an indie-pop band from Germany
- Broomfield (disambiguation)
