= Blumenfeld =

Blumenfeld is a surname. Notable people with the surname include:

- Alan Blumenfeld, American actor
- Amir Blumenfeld, Israeli-American writer and comedian
- Anat Blumenfeld, Israeli biochemist
- Benjamin Blumenfeld (1884–1947), Russian chess player
- Daniel Blumenfeld, American Grammy-winning music producer
- Erik Blumenfeld (1915–1997), German politician
- Erwin Blumenfeld (1897–1969), German-American photographer
- Fannie Zeissler (born Blumenfeld) (1863–1927), Austrian-American pianist
- Felix Blumenfeld (1863–1931), Russian composer, conductor, and pianist
- Hal Blumenfeld (born 1962), American neuroscientist
- Hugh Blumenfeld (b. 1958), American folk musician
- Isadore Blumenfeld (commonly Kid Cann, 1900–1981), American mobster
- J. C. Blumenfeld (c. 1810–c. 1840), Polish-British poet
- Samuel Blumenfeld, American author and educator
- Simon Blumenfeld (1907–2005), English columnist, novelist, playwright and editor
- Simon Blumenfeldt (1760 or 1770 – 1826), Russian Hebrew calligrapher
- Thomas Blumenfeld (born 1997), Canadian boxer

== See also ==
- Blumfeld
- Bloomfield (disambiguation)
