= Ampere station =

Railway station in East Orange, New Jersey

Ampere

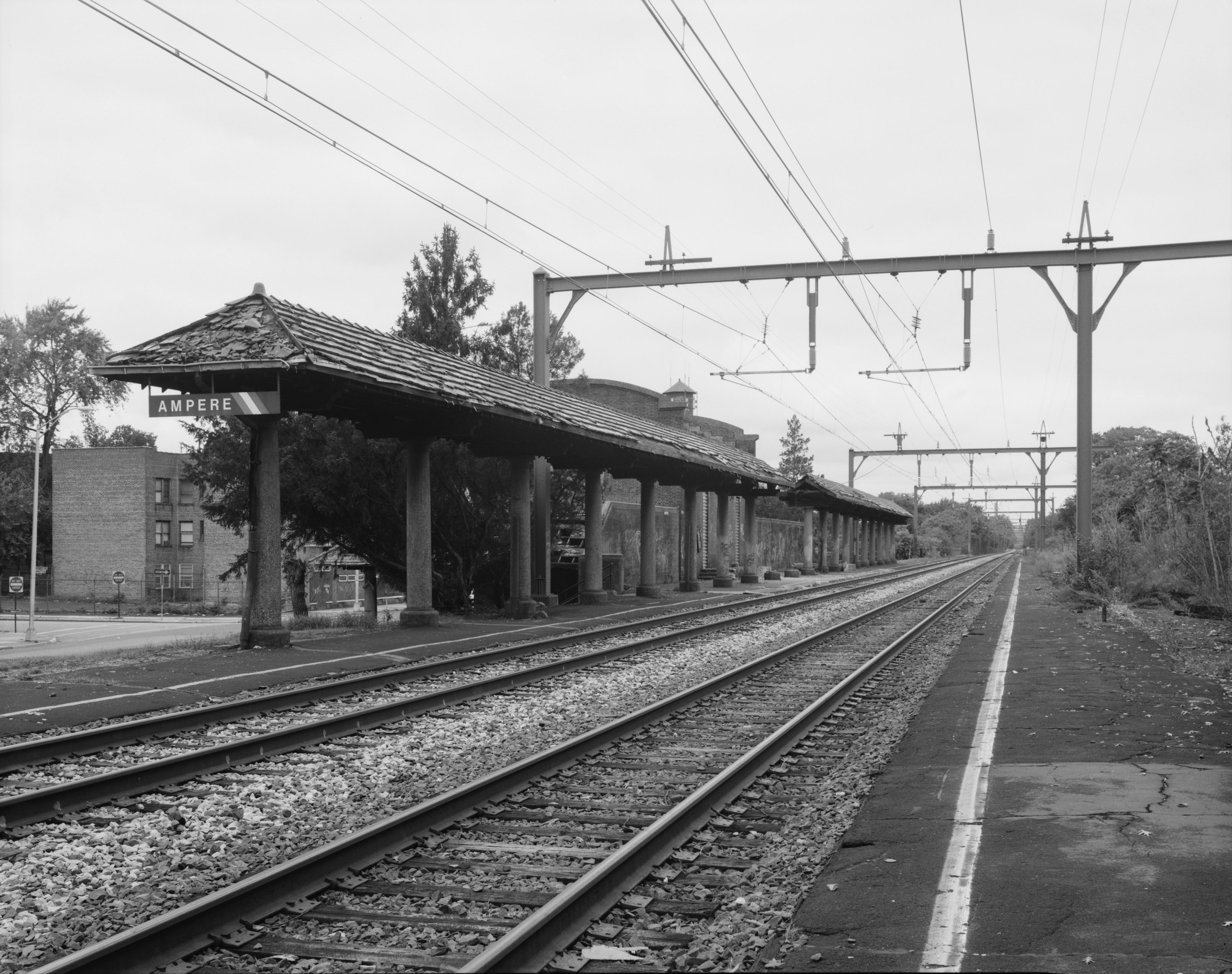
- A view of the Ampere station before its closing, by the Historic American Engineering Record

General information
- Location: Ampere Plaza and Whitney Place, East Orange, New Jersey
- Owner: New Jersey Transit
- Line: Montclair Branch
- Platforms: 2 side platforms
- Tracks: 2

Other information
- Station code: 601 (Delaware, Lackawanna and Western)

History
- Opened: April 24, 1893
- Closed: April 7, 1991
- Rebuilt: 1908
- Electrified: September 3, 1930

Former services
Preceding station	NJ Transit	Following station
Watsessing Avenue toward Bay Street	Montclair Branch	Roseville Avenue toward Hoboken
Preceding station	Delaware, Lackawanna and Western Railroad	Following station
Watsessing Avenue toward Montclair	Montclair Branch	Roseville Avenue toward Hoboken
- Ampere Station
- Formerly listed on the U.S. National Register of Historic Places
- New Jersey Register of Historic Places
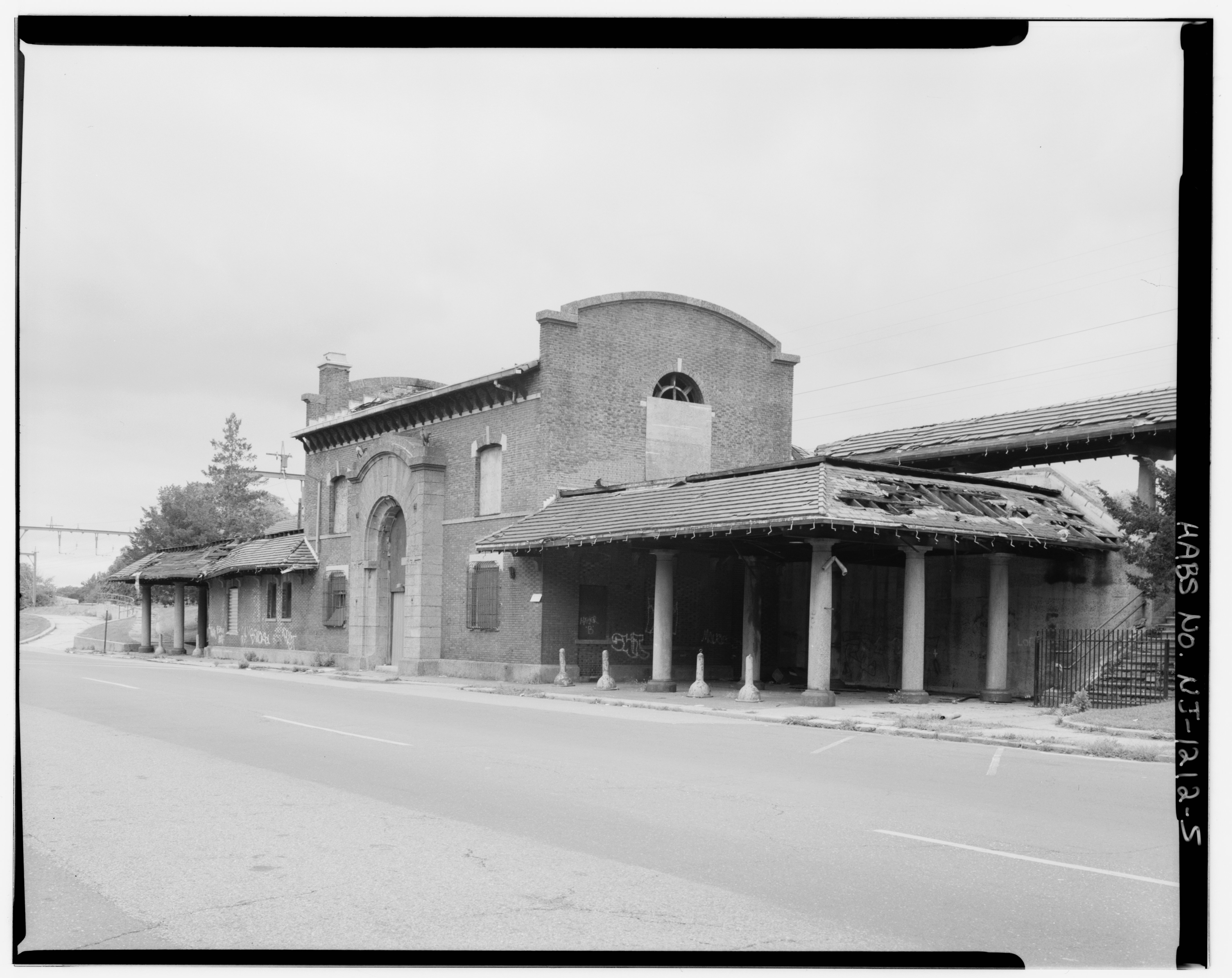
- The 1907 train station depot, slowly falling apart.
- Interactive map of Ampere Station
- Location: Ampere Plaza and Whitney Place, East Orange, New Jersey
- Coordinates: 40°45′55″N 74°11′40″W
- Area: 1.6 acres (0.65 ha)
- Built: 1908
- Architect: Frank J. Nies
- Architectural style: Renaissance
- MPS: Operating Passenger Railroad Stations TR
- NRHP reference No.: 84002628
- NJRHP No.: 1073

Significant dates
- Added to NRHP: June 22, 1984
- Designated NJRHP: March 17, 1984
- Removed from NRHP: October 30, 1990
Location

Ampere, formerly known as The Crescent, is a defunct stop on New Jersey Transit's Montclair Branch (current-day Montclair–Boonton Line) in the city of East Orange, Essex County, New Jersey, United States. A station was first built there in 1890 to service to new Crocker Wheeler plant in the district. The stop was named in honor of André-Marie Ampère, a pioneer in electrodynamics and reconstructed as a new Renaissance Revival station in 1908. Ampere was the second stop on the branch west of Newark Broad Street Station until 1984, when the Roseville Avenue station was closed. In June of that year, the station, along with 42 others, was entered into the National Register of Historic Places. In 1986, after continuous deterioration, New Jersey Transit demolished the westbound shelter built in 1921. The agency discontinued rail service to Ampere on April 7, 1991. The entire station was demolished in 1995.

== History ==
=== Delaware, Lackawanna and Western Railroad (1868–1960) ===
The Montclair Branch was chartered in 1852 as the Newark and Bloomfield Railroad, running through Bloomfield and nearby West Bloomfield (present-day Montclair). However, tracks were not constructed along the owned right-of-way until 1856; in June that year trains began running between Newark, Bloomfield and West Bloomfield. The railroad had a large deficit to start; the ticket agent at West Bloomfield was also the brakeman for the one-car train. On April 1, 1868, the Morris & Essex Railroad bought out the alignment of the Newark and Bloomfield Railroad. The Morris & Essex began running services on the line, which was renamed the Montclair Branch when West Bloomfield was renamed Montclair shortly after. The Delaware, Lackawanna and Western Railroad soon gained trackage rights, and by the turn of the 20th century, the railroad had begun constructing track depressions and raises to eliminate grade-level crossings on city streets.

Before 1890, conductors and engineers on the Lackawanna were ordered to stop at the station only on request from the railroad. The first station at Ampere was constructed in 1890 on a request made by Crocker Wheeler, a local electrical machine industry in East Orange. The station itself was built as a one-story stone structure with a pyramid-shaped roof and eaves overhanging the rails. There were also sidings set to go into the Crocker Wheeler plant. In honor of André-Marie Ampère, the French founder of electrodynamics, the station was named Ampere. The new station quickly attracted substantial ridership destined for the nearby residential and commercial areas which were growing rapidly. In 1907-1908, the Lackawanna built a new structure at Ampere between Springdale and Fourth Avenues. This new station, costing the railroad $44,000 (1907 USD) was a new brick Renaissance Revival structure with a green terra cotta roof, a large arched doorway, and a concrete pedestrian tunnel under the tracks. The new station was opened with a large ceremony, even attended by the French ambassador to the United States, Jules Jusserand.

By 1912, trains heading to or from the Lackawanna's Hoboken Terminal (built in 1907) made more than sixty stops daily at the Ampere station. East Orange, continuing to develop after its 1899 incorporation, began building new luxury apartment buildings and large branches of New York City's department stores, becoming a major commerce stop. The town resisted the Lackawanna's plans to raise the tracks in their town (elevated tracks having a reputation for being unsightly and noisy), and sued the Lackawanna to prevent construction. In 1921, the suits were resolved in favor of the Lackawanna, and construction began. Tracks through Ampere were raised twelve feet higher and a second story was added to the station depot. A platform canopy was added to the westbound side of the station along with a brick shelter. The station saw electric train service for the first time in 1930 when the Lackawanna in conjunction with Thomas Edison with overhead catenary wires. Through the 1940s and 1950s the station was in its prime, with the Montclair Branch thought to be the most used commuter rail line in the United States.

During the years after World War II, East Orange saw a loss in industry and a diminishing tax base. The Crocker Wheeler plant, the original advocate for the station, closed and was bought by the Carrier Corporation to manufacture refrigerators and air conditioners.

=== Erie Lackawanna Railroad and Conrail (1960–1980) ===
In 1960, the Erie Railroad and the Lackawanna, both facing financial problems, announced a merger of the railroads on October 17 of that year, forming the Erie-Lackawanna Railroad. The merged company continued to struggle, eventually declaring bankruptcy, and sought to discontinue or transfer all passenger service. The merged company never emerged from bankruptcy and came to an end in April 1976, when the Erie-Lackawanna merged as part of the new federal Consolidated Rail Corporation (Conrail).

=== NJDOT and New Jersey Transit (1980–1995) ===
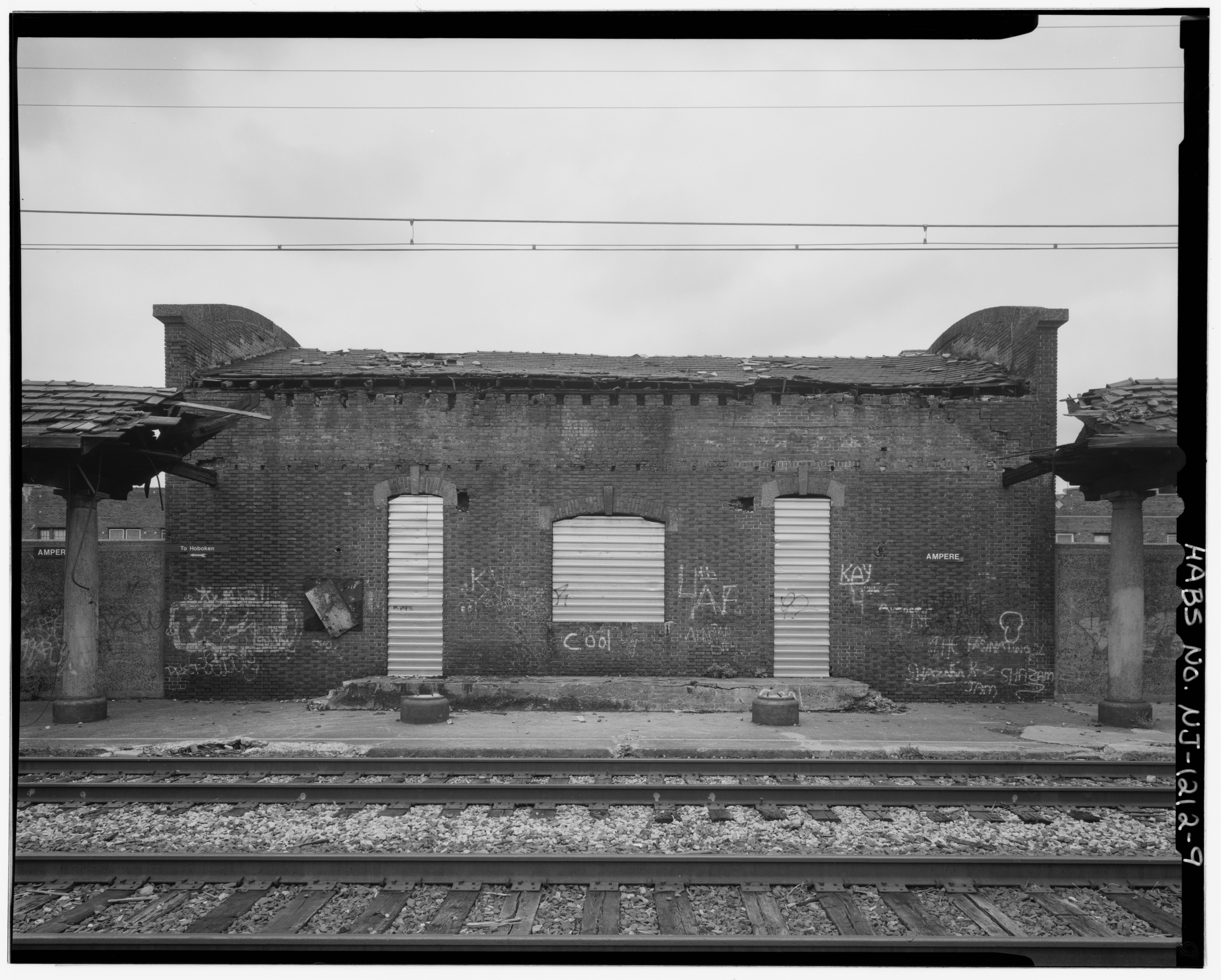
A view of the platform at the deteriorating Ampere depot

Commuter rail operations under Conrail were short-lived, turned over to the New Jersey Department of Transportation for service in 1980. At this point, the DOT (and the newly formed New Jersey Transit) shut the inside waiting room of the deteriorating station depot. On June 22, 1984, along with buildings of a similar purpose, Ampere station was added to the National Register of Historic Places. However, the station's interior continued to fall into disrepair. The 1921-constructed westbound shelter was demolished in 1986. The next year, New Jersey Transit petitioned the Commissioner for Natural and Historic Resources to demolish the station. The commissioner directed New Jersey Transit to first stabilize the station and either sell it to East Orange or advertise the station for lease or sale to a private developer, but little was accomplished.

By 1990, the station served just 51 people boarding twenty-eight trains daily. Service was suspended at Ampere and the nearby Grove Street station on April 7, 1991, ostensibly until ridership forecasts increased substantially. The next year, the station suffered a large fire. After being unable to find a new use for the structure, New Jersey Transit demolished the station in 1995.

== Proposed reconstruction of Ampere ==
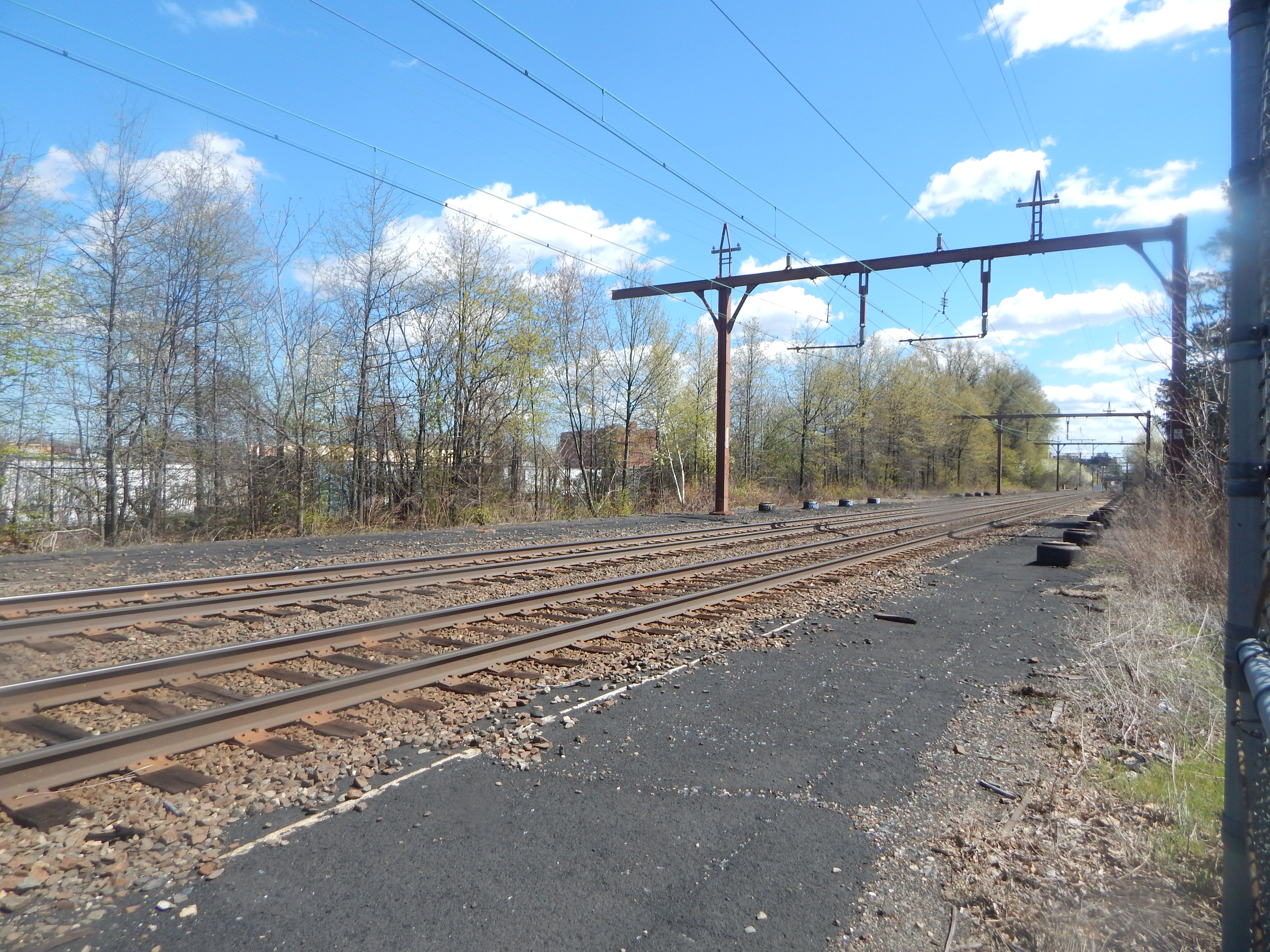
The Ampere station site in April 2015 with the abandoned platforms

In 2005, the city of East Orange began looking into the idea of rebuilding and reopening a new station at Ampere. The station site remains, with its asphalt platforms and eastbound driveway left in place. The station's stairs were all removed, and the landing to one entrance has catenary wires running on it. A study conducted in 2005 envisioned the station would attract commuters who would not go to Brick Church station, the main one in East Orange. The study also suggested applying for funds from the Department of Transportation's transit village program. Because the station remains on the National Register of Historic Places, construction plans would need to be approved by the United States Secretary of the Interior. A new structure would need to meet the Americans with Disabilities Act of 1990 form, with high-level platforms (51 inches (1.3 m) off the ground and 630 feet (190 m) long), new canopies, ramps and stairs. The new station will also have an average of thirty-second dwell time at the station, resulting in a minute and twenty seconds added to the commute time. Due to the level of usage, no more than a three-sided brick shelter, similar to those at Montclair Heights or Lake Hopatcong stations would be needed.

== See also ==
- Operating Passenger Railroad Stations Thematic Resource
- National Register of Historic Places listings in Essex County, New Jersey
