= Glen Ridge station =

NJ Transit rail station

Glen Ridge
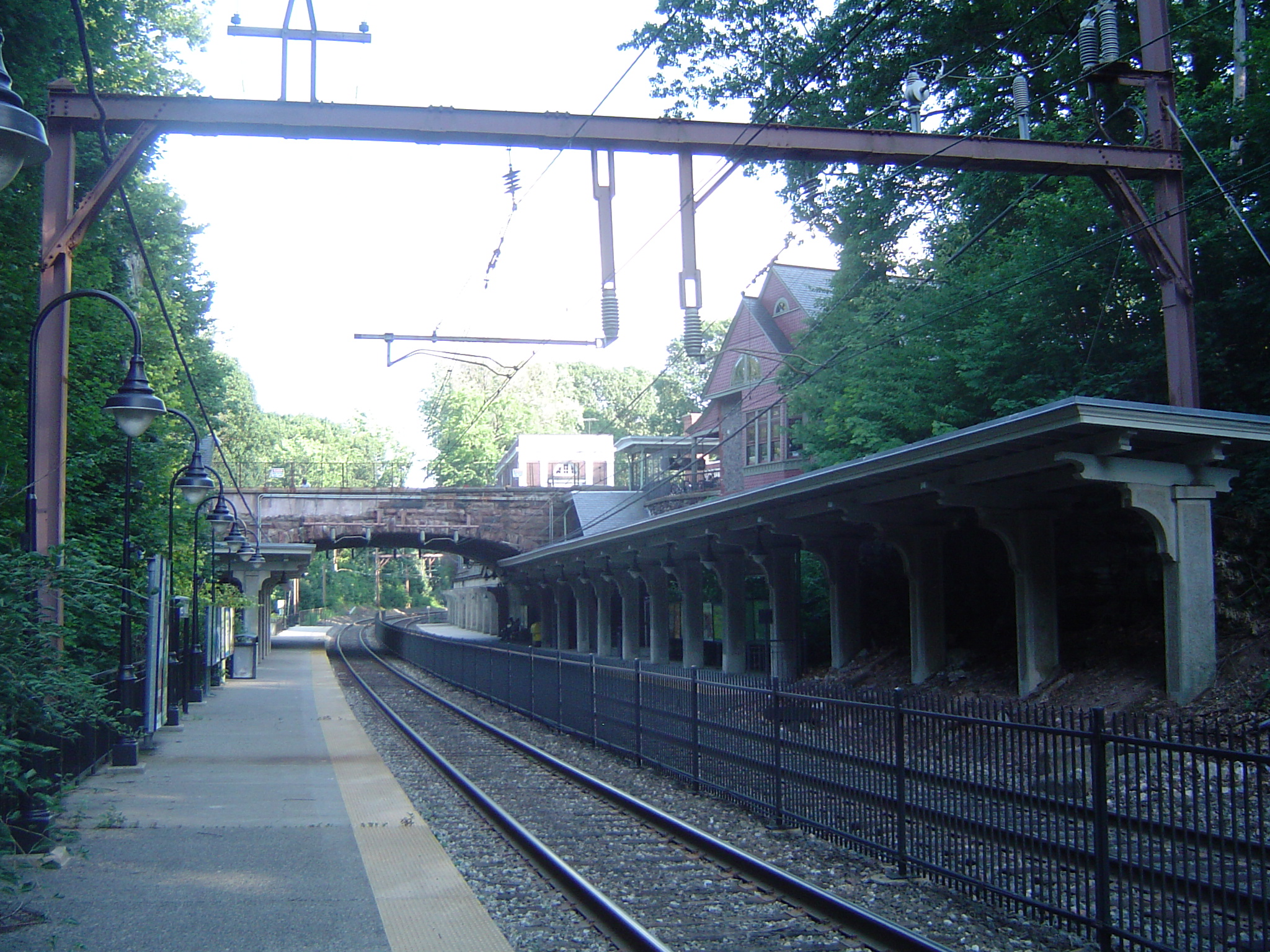
- Glen Ridge station

General information
- Location: 224 Ridgewood Avenue (CR 653), Glen Ridge, New Jersey
- Coordinates: 40.8002°N 74.2043°W
- Owner: New Jersey Transit
- Platforms: 2 side platforms
- Tracks: 2
- Connections: NJT Bus: 11, 28, and 29 (all buses on Bloomfield Avenue)

Other information
- Station code: 603 (Delaware, Lackawanna and Western)
- Fare zone: 4

History
- Opened: 1860
- Rebuilt: 1872; 1887
- Electrified: September 3, 1930
- Former names: Ridgewood

Passengers
- 2025: 823 (average weekday)
- Rank: 36 of 153

Services
Preceding station	NJ Transit	Following station
Bay Street toward Hackettstown	Montclair–Boonton Line	Bloomfield toward New York or Hoboken
Former services
Preceding station	NJ Transit	Following station
Bay Street Terminus	Montclair Branch	Bloomfield toward Hoboken
Preceding station	Delaware, Lackawanna and Western Railroad	Following station
Montclair Terminus	Montclair Branch	Bloomfield toward Hoboken
Location

Glen Ridge is a New Jersey Transit station at the intersection of Bloomfield Avenue and Ridgewood Avenue in Glen Ridge, Essex County, New Jersey along the Montclair–Boonton Line. Service through Glen Ridge comes from Hoboken Terminal and New York Penn Station and goes through to one of four termini, Bay Street (on weekends), Montclair State University, Dover and Hackettstown. The station depot is on-grade level with Ridgewood Avenue, with the platform and tracks below street-level.

== History ==
In 1860, N&B Railroad constructed a platform at Prospect Street known as Ridgewood Station, and its trains made regular stops there. A new Ridgewood Station was built in 1887.

The platforms at Glen Ridge, along with the stations at Bloomfield and Watsessing Avenue stations along the Montclair Branch were all built in 1912 during a grade separation program by the Delaware, Lackawanna, and Western Railroad. The Glen Ridge station, like the Watsessing Avenue station, was set below street level. It is a contributing property to the Glen Ridge Historic District and the Operating Passenger Railroad Stations Thematic Resource.

== Station layout ==
Glen Ridge's low-level side platforms are not accessible.

== In popular culture ==
Glen Ridge the site of the train station scene in the 2003 film Mona Lisa Smile that starred Julia Roberts. It also appeared in Far From Heaven.

== See also ==
- Benson Street station
- National Register of Historic Places listings in Essex County, New Jersey
