= Watsessing Avenue station =

NJ Transit rail station

Watsessing Ave.
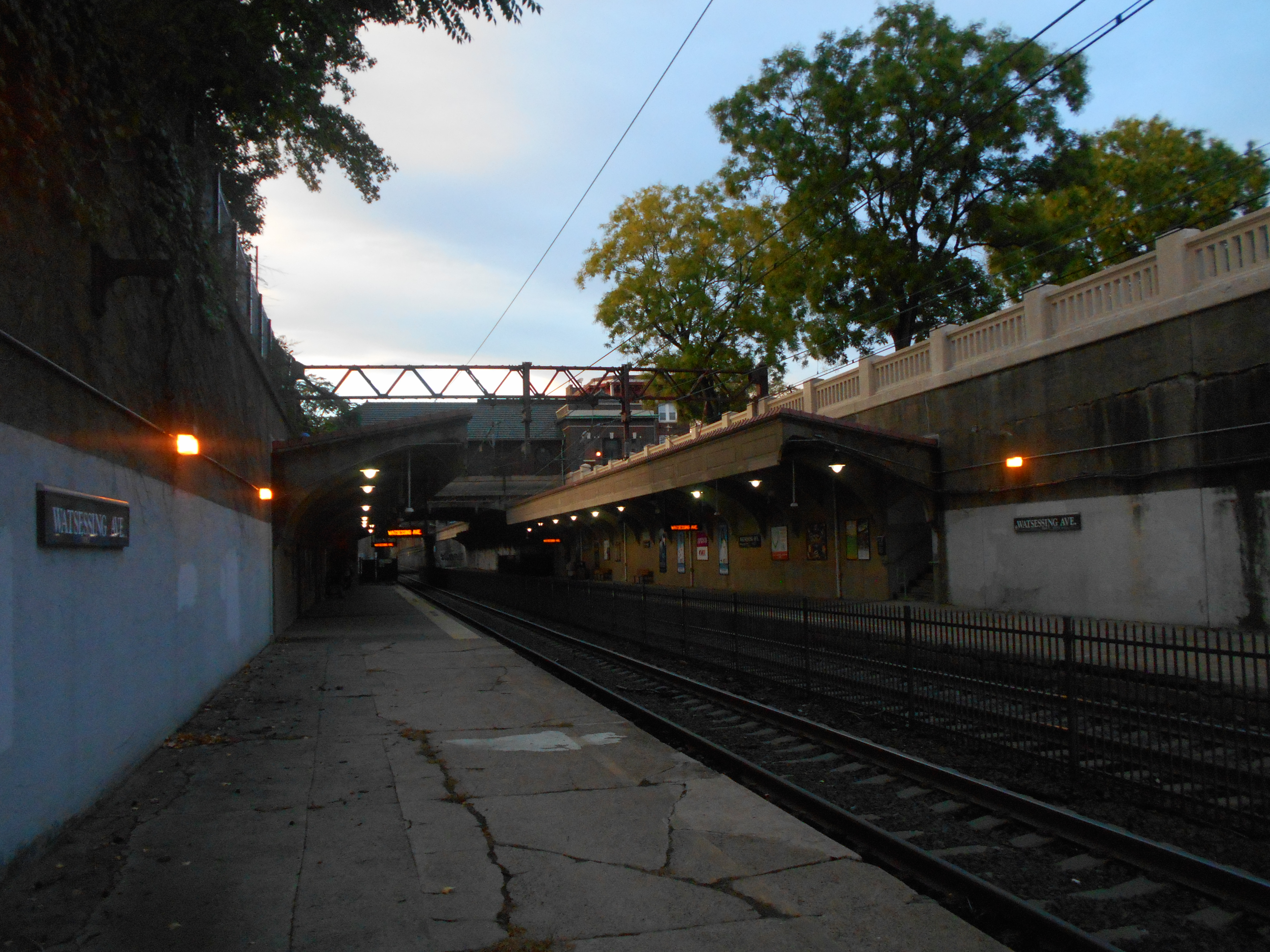
- Watsessing Avenue station as viewed from its outbound platform, showing results of rehabilitation project undertaken in 2008.

General information
- Location: Watsessing Avenue; Bloomfield, New Jersey
- Coordinates: 40°46′58″N 74°11′55″W
- Owner: New Jersey Transit
- Platforms: 2 side platforms
- Tracks: 2
- Connections: NJ Transit Bus: 94

Construction
- Structure type: Below-grade
- Platform levels: 2
- Parking: 59 spaces, 2 accessible spaces
- Cycle facilities: Racks
- Accessible: No

Other information
- Station code: 602 (Delaware, Lackawanna and Western)
- Fare zone: 4

History
- Rebuilt: 1912
- Electrified: September 3, 1930
- Former names: Doddtown; Watsessing

Key dates
- September 1910: Original station depot razed

Passengers
- 2025: 517 (average weekday)
- Rank: 56 of 153

Services
Preceding station	NJ Transit	Following station
Bloomfield toward Hackettstown	Montclair–Boonton Line	Newark Broad Street toward New York or Hoboken
Former services
Preceding station	NJ Transit	Following station
Bloomfield toward Bay Street	Montclair Branch	Ampere (before 1991) toward Hoboken
Preceding station	Delaware, Lackawanna and Western Railroad	Following station
Bloomfield toward Montclair	Montclair Branch	Ampere toward Hoboken
Location

Watsessing Avenue station (also known as Watsessing) is a New Jersey Transit rail station in Bloomfield, New Jersey, along the Montclair–Boonton Line. It is located beneath the Bloomfield Police Benevolent Association meeting hall (which formerly served as the station building) near the corner of Watsessing Avenue and Orange Street in Bloomfield. It is one of two stations on the line where the boarding platform is below ground level (the Glen Ridge station, two stops away from it, is the other). The Watsessing station and the Kingsland station in Lyndhurst on the Main Line shared similar designs (both station platforms are located below street level) and were built about the same time.

The current Glen Ridge, Bloomfield and Watsessing stations along the Montclair branch were all built in 1912 during a grade separation program by the Delaware, Lackawanna and Western Railroad. During New Jersey Transit's running of the line, two stations between Watsessing and Newark Broad Street were closed due to low ridership—the Roseville Avenue station in Newark, at the junction with the Morristown Line on September 16, 1984, and Ampere station in East Orange on April 7, 1991. The word "Watsessing" is a Native American term that translates to "mouth of the creek".

The station has been on the New Jersey State Historic Preservation Office listings since March 25, 1998, the last of the four stations from East Orange to Glen Ridge to receive the listing. On September 14, 2005, the entire Montclair Branch was added to the same listings, although Ampere, Bloomfield and Glen Ridge stations have been on the listings since March 17, 1984.

== Station layout and services ==
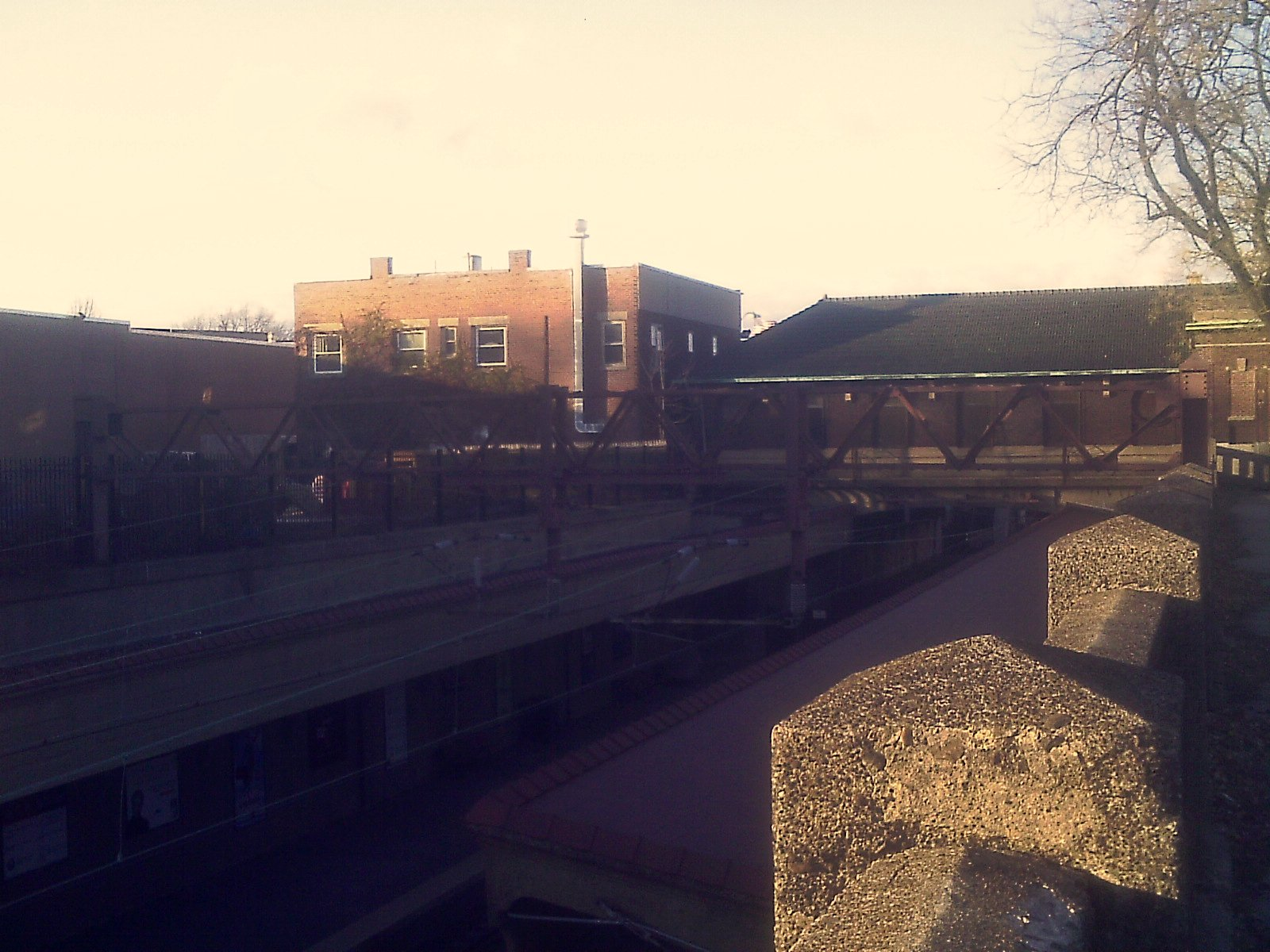
Watsessing Avenue station facing northward from Westinghouse Plaza

Watsessing Avenue station is located on the corner of Watsessing Avenue and Orange Street at Westinghouse Plaza in Bloomfield and is just blocks from Bloomfield's borders with East Orange and Orange. The former depot is currently used by the Bloomfield Police Benevolent Association. There are two below-street-level platforms at the Watsessing station. Ticket vending machines are available at street level on Watsessing Avenue.

The station also has two parking lots for use. Maintained by the Bloomfield Parking Authority, the first is on Westinghouse Plaza (near the former Westinghouse Lamp Plant) and has fourteen parking spaces. The parking uses daily parking rules, paying six days a week at $0.25 an hour, except for Sunday, when parking is free. A second lot is available at the intersection of Myrtle Street and Walnut Street. It has forty-five parking spots, two of which are handicap accessible. The lot also contains permit spaces six days a week and free on Sundays, with a cost of $20 parking per quarter (three months).

The station has low-level side platforms that are not handicap accessible. The two nearest accessible stations are Newark Broad Street and Bay Street.

== History ==
=== Delaware, Lackawanna and Western ownership (1856–1976) ===
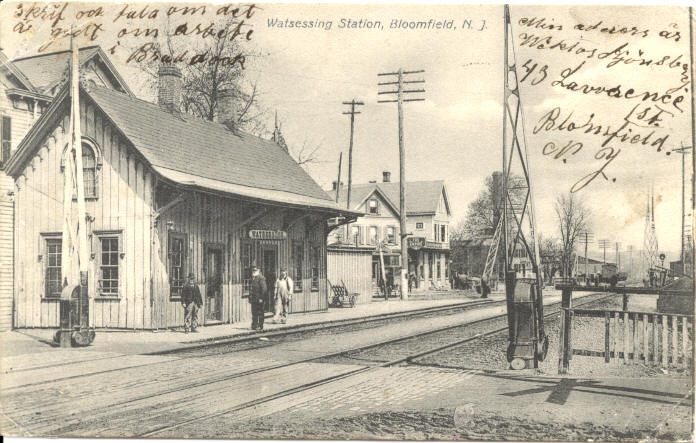
The former Watsessing Avenue station, prior to the grade separation in 1912

The history of a station at Watsessing Avenue in the Watsessing district of Bloomfield dates back to the Newark and Bloomfield Railroad, established in 1856. The station, a houseless station off of Dodd Street, was deemed first as Doddtown by a railroad conductor. This name soon gave way to Watsessing, and in 1865, the line was bought by the Morris and Essex Railroad, running through trains. The Morris and Essex Railroad was soon bought out by the Delaware, Lackawanna and Western Railroad, and a new station was built, deemed Watsessing.

In 1911, as the Delaware, Lackawanna and Western Railroad continued the project of eliminating at-grade crossings between streets and railroads, the Montclair Branch was the next to receive the structural change. Bloomfield criticized the Lackawanna railroad for making a disgrace of the community. The railroad proposed using $700,000 (1911 USD) of funds to construct a brand new station at Watsessing Avenue along with a new downtown Bloomfield station. The cost of elevating and depressing the railroad came up to about $20,000 (1911 USD) for the Lackawanna. This contract by the railroad and township was approved after negotiations dating back to 1908. The negotiations included a park to be built between both stations on both sides of the railroad. The park land cost the township $50,000 to buy for the construction, and it was to be turned over to the Essex County Park Commission. The former station depot was razed in September 1910 for the construction project.

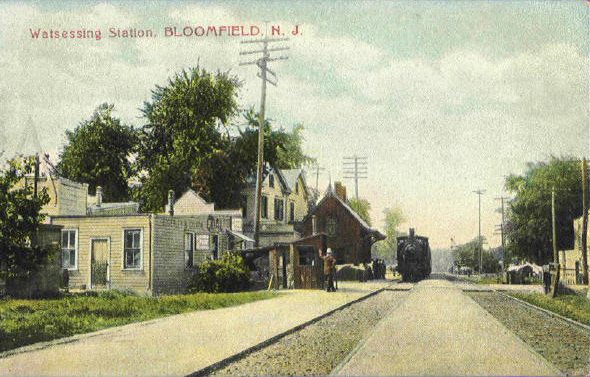
Watsessing Avenue station before depressing the station as viewed past the former at-grade crossings

Construction was completed on a 1.5 miles (2.4 km) long segment of the Montclair Branch from East Orange to Glen Ridge and was opened to rail service on November 15, 1912. The project laid 91 pounds (41 kg) of track in addition to steel ties and stone ballast. The station has concrete crossings at Dodd Street, Arlington Avenue and Watsessing Avenue along with a new crossing of the Erie Railroad's Orange Branch just south of the station. The design of Watsessing Avenue's new station was difficult due to the limited right-of-way. While making the separation, a new trench had to be dug, which included retaining walls that prevented moving the existing track alignment to delay railroad traffic. When the station was finished, tracks were shifted to make room for a second track. The station depot was built over the railroad tracks with four concrete arches to support the building. A four-inch (10 cm) ceiling was constructed on the arches, and the station was widened to take more volume of train service.

The station served as the third station on the Montclair Branch, which was first electrified by technology created by Thomas Alva Edison in 1930. The overhead catenary wires were installed, making the line the first electrically run line on the Delaware, Lackawanna and Western alignment. The station remained in service for the Lackawanna Railroad for three more decades, when the railroad merged with the Erie Railroad on October 17, 1960. Although the now Erie-Lackawanna Railway continued to run the Montclair Branch, it reduced service, reducing the once two-rail alignment to one lone track, and removed most of the tracks at Lackawanna Terminal in Montclair. On April 1, 1976, the station was transferred to the Consolidated Rail Corporation (Conrail) as the Erie-Lackawanna Railway was dissolved into the Conrail program.

=== New Jersey Transit and historical status (1979–present) ===
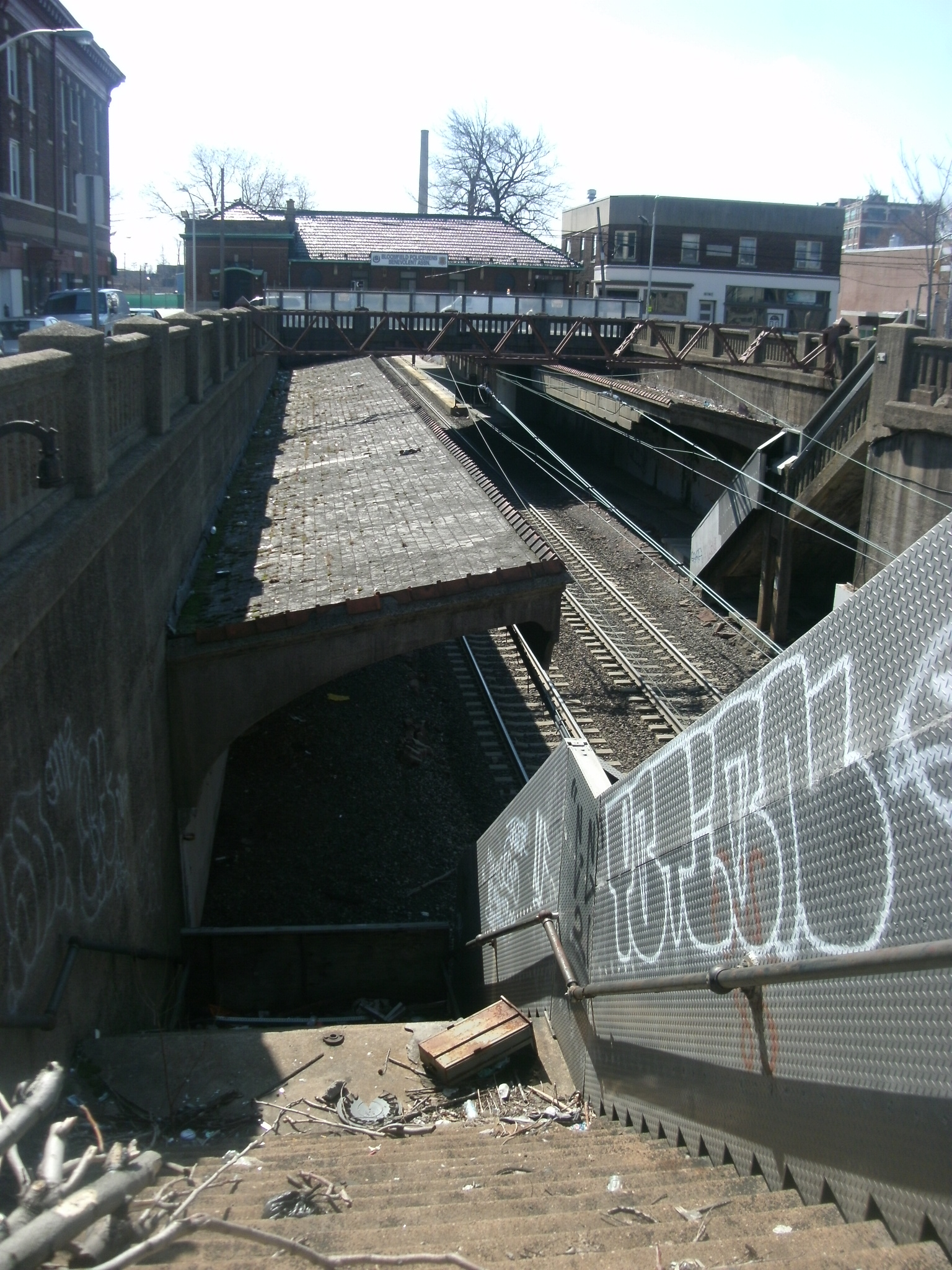
These two staircases visible enabled Watsessing Avenue passengers to access the platforms from Orange Street without having to cross via the station building (at rear). Access to them was blocked off as part of the 2008 rehabilitation project.

In 1979, New Jersey Transit was formed to run bus and train service in place of Conrail and the New Jersey Department of Transportation. In 1983, New Jersey Transit took over rail service from Conrail, and just one year later, the line became a temporary diesel rail line when the overhead catenary wires had to be adjusted for conversion to higher electrical voltage. The station itself was still the third on the Montclair Branch, but the line now ran into a new station at Bay Street in Montclair. On March 17, 1984 all stations on the Montclair Branch but the Roseville Avenue station in Newark, Bay Street and Watsessing Avenue were added to the State Register of Historic Places. The same would occur on June 22, 1984 at the national level with Ampere, Glen Ridge and Bloomfield Stations being added to the National Register of Historic Places. On September 16, 1984, Roseville Avenue station was closed, and just over six years later, on April 7, 1991, Ampere station in East Orange was closed. Since then, Watsessing Avenue has been the first station New Jersey Transit has served on the Montclair Branch, although East Orange has proposed reopening the station at Ampere as part of a redevelopment plan for the Ampere district.

On March 25, 1998, the station at Watsessing Avenue was given the State Historical Preservation Organization honor that Ampere, Glen Ridge and Bloomfield stations received just fourteen years prior. The station continued to receive service through the opening of Montclair Connection on September 30, 2002, which ended service as the Montclair Branch and began as the Montclair-Boonton Line, still the first station on the line after Newark Broad Street Station. On September 10, 2007, New Jersey Transit announced the canopies of the old station, then 95 years old, were to be restored and repaired. The service contracted a $1.7 million project to Watertrol Incorporated of Cranford. At that time, the station served an average of 200 people daily. Improvements for the station included brand new canopy lighting, repairs to the cantilever canopies, replacement of stairways and fencing, along with changing roof tiles and a new drainage system to replace the 1912 version. When the construction was finished in October 2008, the station now served nearly 450 people daily on average. A ceremony to mark its completion was held on October 30, 2008.

== See also ==
- Kingsland station – The design of Watsessing Avenue with the depot above the tracks was a replica of the style used at Kingsland.
