= Bloomfield station =

NJ Transit rail station

Bloomfield
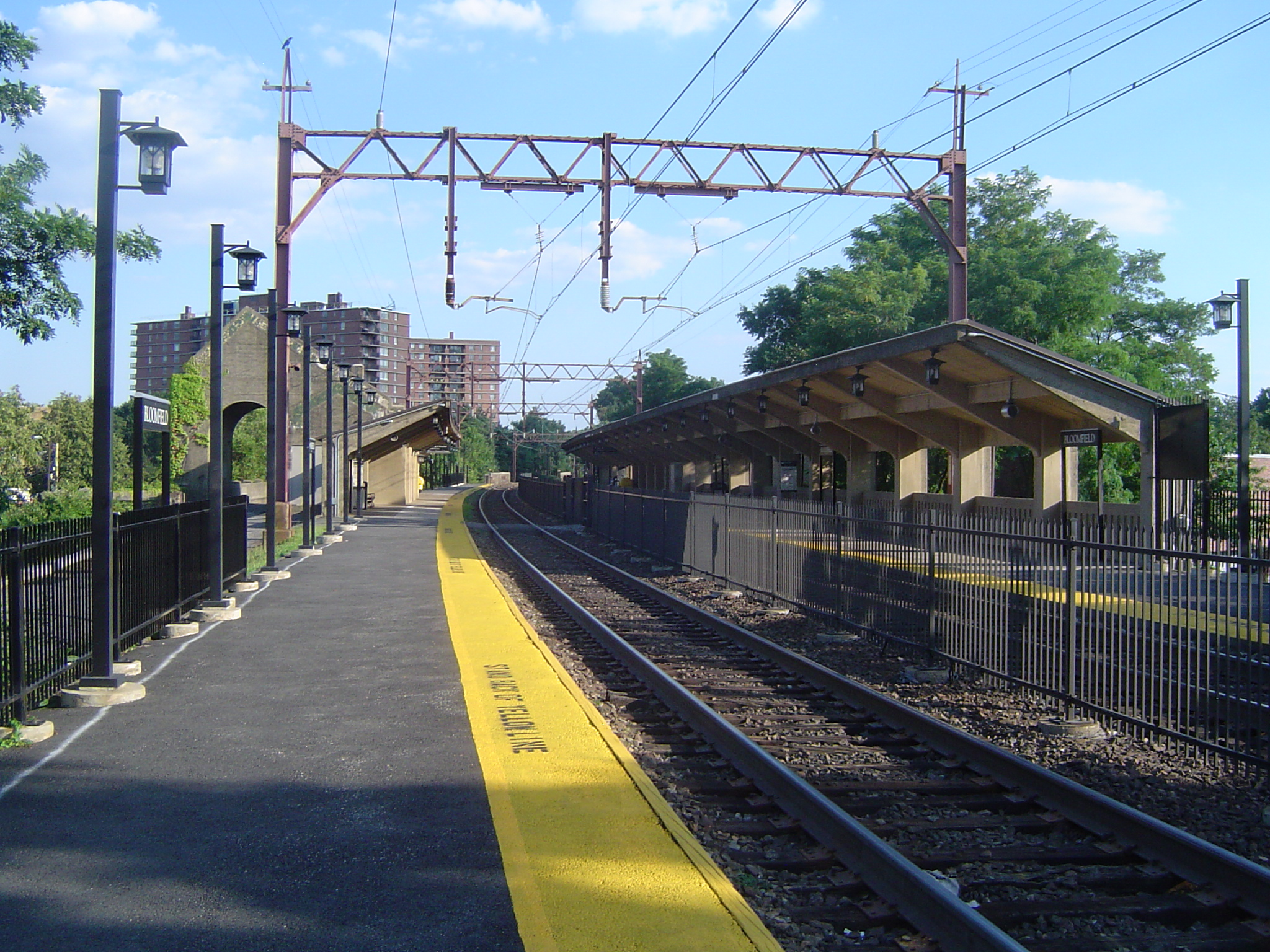
- Bloomfield station facing downtown Bloomfield from the inbound platform.

General information
- Location: 19 Lackawanna Plaza, Bloomfield, New Jersey
- Coordinates: 40.7928°N 74.2001°W
- Owner: New Jersey Transit
- Platforms: 2 side platforms
- Tracks: 2
- Connections: NJ Transit Bus: 11, 28, go28, 29, 34, 72, 92, 94, 709

Construction
- Accessible: No

Other information
- Station code: 603 (Delaware, Lackawanna and Western)
- Fare zone: 4

History
- Opened: 1855
- Rebuilt: 1912
- Electrified: September 3, 1930

Passengers
- 2025: 1,163 (average weekday)
- Rank: 27 of 153

Services
Preceding station	NJ Transit	Following station
Glen Ridge toward Hackettstown	Montclair–Boonton Line	Watsessing Avenue toward New York or Hoboken
Former services
Preceding station	NJ Transit	Following station
Glen Ridge toward Bay Street	Montclair Branch	Watsessing Avenue toward Hoboken
Preceding station	Delaware, Lackawanna and Western Railroad	Following station
Glen Ridge toward Montclair	Montclair Branch	Watsessing Avenue toward Hoboken
- Bloomfield Station
- U.S. National Register of Historic Places
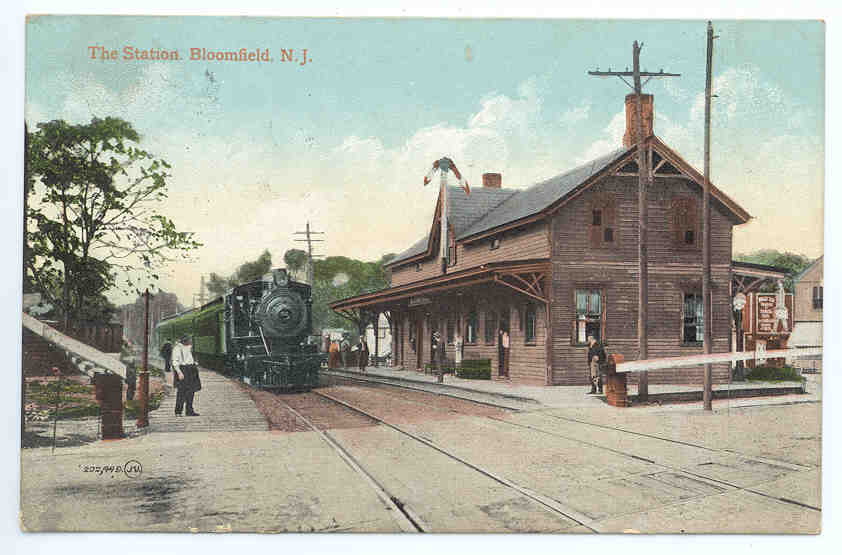
- The original station building in circa 1908, prior to the 1912 track elevation
- Location: Washington St. and Glenwood Ave., Bloomfield, New Jersey
- Coordinates: 40°47′33″N 74°12′3″W
- Area: 2 acres (0.8 ha)
- Built: 1912
- Architects: Nies, Frank J.
- Architectural style: Proto-Modern
- MPS: Operating Passenger Railroad Stations TR
- NRHP reference No.: 84002631
- Added to NRHP: June 22, 1984
Location

Bloomfield is a New Jersey Transit station in Bloomfield, New Jersey, located along the Montclair–Boonton Line. The station is located in downtown Bloomfield, the second within the municipality, just west of Bloomfield Avenue. This is the second station within the township served on the line after Watsessing Avenue station.

== History ==
The current Glen Ridge, Bloomfield and Watsessing Avenue stations along the Montclair Branch were all built in 1912 during a grade separation program by the Delaware, Lackawanna and Western Railroad. Bloomfield Station has been on the New Jersey Register of Historic Places since March 17, 1984 and the National Register of Historic Places since June 22, 1984 and as part of the Operating Passenger Railroad Stations Thematic Resource.

The station is the centerpiece of a plan to revitalize Bloomfield's central business district which has been designated a transit-oriented development (TOD) transit village. The former headhouse is privately owned but has not been redeveloped. In 2011, the owner announced they would sell the building, enabling the town to influence future plans.

Bloomfield station is the terminus of the go bus 28, one of the first lines to use bus rapid transit in New Jersey, making limited stops through Newark to Newark Liberty International Airport.

== Station layout ==
The station has two ticket machines on the eastbound platform (to Newark and New York). The low-level side platforms are not accessible.

== See also ==
- List of New Jersey Transit stations
- National Register of Historic Places listings in Essex County, New Jersey
