= Bloomfield, Arkansas =

Unincorporated community in Arkansas, U.S.

Coordinates: 36°16′34″N 94°32′18″W

Bloomfield is an unincorporated community in Benton County, Arkansas, United States.

A post office called Bloomfield was established in 1875, and remained in operation until 1904. The town site was platted around the time the post office was established.
