= Simon Blumenfeldt =

Russian calligrapher (died 1826)

- Born: 1760 or 1770; Mitau, Courland, Polish–Lithuanian Commonwealth
- Died: 1826; Mitau, Courland, Russian Empire

Simon Blumenfeldt (Yiddish: שמעון בלומענפעלד; 1760 or 1770 – 1826), also known as Simon Sofer (Hebrew: שמעון סופר), was a Russian Hebrew calligrapher and writer.

He possessed the gift of writing in characters so small that they could be read only by the aid of a microscope. The Lord's Prayer was thus written by him nine times on a piece of paper the size of a square inch. He could write readable letters and words even on the very edge of ordinary vellum paper. He was also a skilful draftsman, and he used to embellish his excellent pencil sketches with all kind of verses and sentences. He traveled extensively through Europe, and received rewards from many sovereigns. Blumenfeldt presented numerous script portraits to Emperor Alexander I of Russia, and a Torah, of the size of a finger, to Pope Pius VII.

He left in manuscript Diaries of Travel; Pene Shim'on, a commentary on the Bible, published by his son Moses in his work, Magid Mesharim (Hanover, 1851); and Tenaim u-Ketubah le-Shev'uot ve-Purim, a humoristic poem.
