= Bloomfield High School =

Bloomfield High School may refer to:

== Canada ==
- Bloomfield High School (Halifax, Nova Scotia), Halifax, Nova Scotia

== United States ==
- Bloomfield High School (Connecticut), Bloomfield, Connecticut, US
- Bloomfield High School (Bloomfield, Nebraska), Bloomfield, Nebraska, US
- Bloomfield High School (Bloomfield, Indiana), Bloomfield, Indiana, US
- Bloomfield High School (Bloomfield, Missouri), Bloomfield, Missouri, US
- Bloomfield High School (New Jersey), Bloomfield, New Jersey, US
- Bloomfield High School (Bloomfield, New Mexico), Bloomfield, New Mexico, US
- Bloomfield High School (Bloomfield, New York), Bloomfield, New York, US
- Bloomfield High School (North Bloomfield, Ohio), North Bloomfield, Ohio, US
