= J. C. Blumenfeld =

Polish-Jewish revolutionary and poet

J. C. Blumenfeld (c. 1810–c. 1840) was a Polish-Jewish revolutionary and poet.

Blumenfeld was one of the leaders of a band of young Poles concerned in the Polish revolution of 1831. The rising having proved a failure, Blumenfeld fled to London, where he produced the poetical work Ecce Homo, im Process mit dem König und dem Priester oder Die Selbsterlösung der Menschen, ein Evangelium vom Jüngsten Gerichte (London, 1835). An English edition, under the title The New Ecce Homo, at Issue with King and Priest, appeared in London in 1839. The work contains dialogues in prose alternating with verses, the main subject of which is the scheme of kings and priests to enslave humanity, including a compact between Rome and the Church to degrade the Jewish people. He is also credited with the authorship of a series of pamphlets entitled The Existence of Christ Disproved (London, 1841).

== Publications ==
- Blumenfeld, J. C. (1835). Ecce Homo, im Process mit dem König und dem Priester oder Die Selbsterlösung der Menschen, ein Evangelium vom Jüngsten Gerichte (in German). London.
- Blumenfeld, J. C. (1839). The New Ecce Homo, at Issue with King and Priest; or, The Self-Redemption of Man; A Gospel of the Last Judgment. London: H. Hetherington.
