= Bloomfield (Herndon, Virginia) =

Historic house in Virginia, United States

- U.S. National Register of Historic Places
- Virginia Landmarks Register
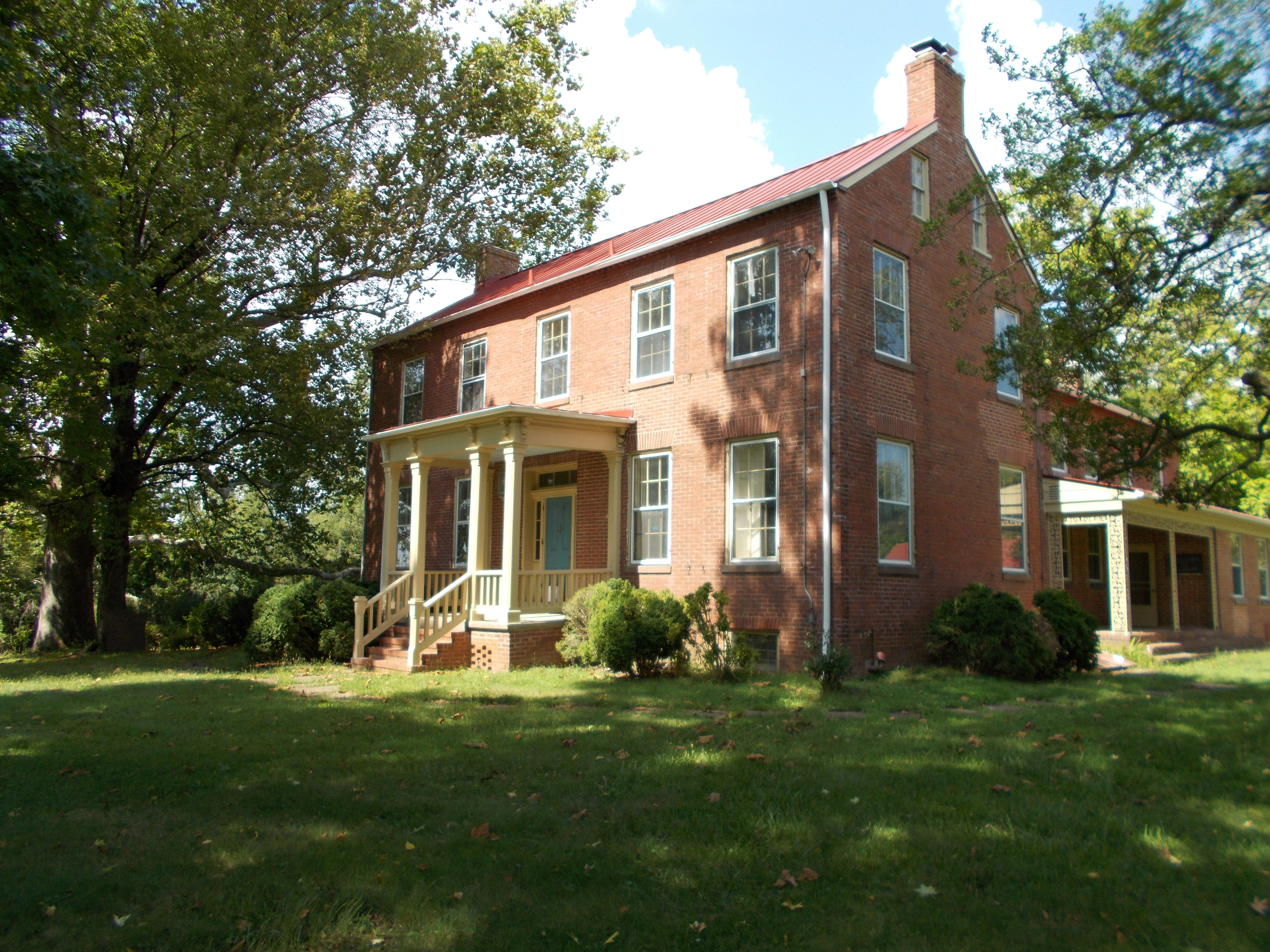

- Location within Northern Virginia Location within Virginia Location within the United States
- Location: 12000 Leesburg Pike, near Herndon, Virginia
- Coordinates: 39°00′37″N 77°21′34″W
- Area: 11.35 acres (4.59 ha)
- Built: c. 1858
- Architectural style: Federal, Greek Revival
- NRHP reference No.: 12001266
- VLR No.: 029-0115

Significant dates
- Added to NRHP: February 5, 2013
- Designated VLR: December 13, 2012

Bloomfield, also known as Holly Knoll, is a historic home located near Herndon, Fairfax County, Virginia. It was built about 1858, and is a two-story, five-bay, red brick I-house with a two-story service wing. The front facade has small one-story front portico with a flat roof is supported by four plain square posts. The house has Federal / Greek Revival-style details.

It was listed on the National Register of Historic Places in 2013.
