= Samuel Blumenfeld =

American academic and writer (1926–2015)

Samuel Blumenfeld (born 1926 in New York – 2015 in Waltham) was a phonics advocate and conservative writer. He frequently lectured in favor of systematic phonics instruction in the teaching of reading and wrote over a dozen books on education. Blumenfeld's critiques against having psychologies in the U.S. public education system is often quoted by Church of Scientology in their publications, and he serves in the Board of Commissioners of Citizens Commission on Human Rights, a Scientology affiliated lobbying organization.

== Biography ==
Growing up in the South Bronx, Blumenfeld saw combat in Italy during World War II and later graduated from the City College of New York. He published multiple books on education and spent much of his career investigating the decline in American literacy, the rise in learning disabilities in American children, sex and drug education, and other topics related to education. Blumenfeld was an advocate of homeschooling.He was awarded an honorary Doctor of Laws from Bob Jones University in May 1986.

Blumenfeld was also active in the Shakespeare authorship question, theorizing in his 2008 The Marlowe-Shakespeare Connection that Christopher Marlowe may have written many of the works attributed to Shakespeare.

== Published works ==
How To Tutor and Alpha Phonics outline Blumenfeld's preferred methods for teaching children basic school subjects.

Other published works include:

- N.E.A.: Trojan Horse in American Education
- Why Schools Went Public
- How to Tutor
- The Whole Language / OBE Fraud
- The Victims of Dick and Jane
- Alpha-Phonics: A Primer For Beginning Readers
- Homeschooling: A Parents Guide to Teaching Children
- New Illiterates and How You Can Keep Your Child from Becoming One
- Is Public Education Necessary?
- Property in a Humane Economy
- The Marlowe-Shakespeare Connection: A New Study of the Authorship Question
- Crimes of the Educators: How Utopians Are Using Government Schools to Destroy America's Children (co-written with Alex Newman)
