= Lackawanna Terminal (Montclair, New Jersey) =

Railway station in Montclair, U.S.

MONTCLAIR
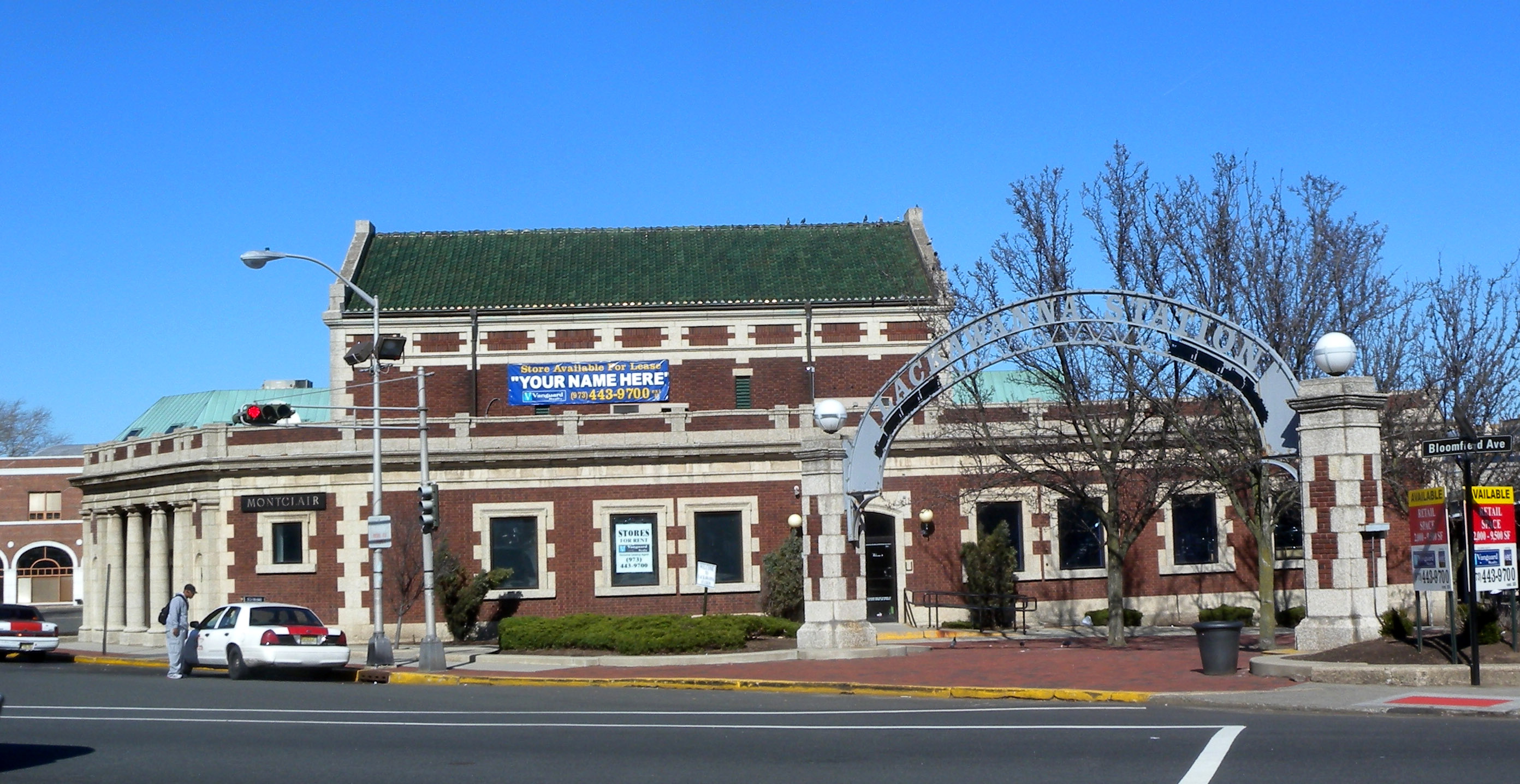

General information
- Location: Lackawanna Plaza, Montclair, Essex County, New Jersey 07042
- Coordinates: 40°48′41″N 74°12′48″W
- Platforms: 4
- Tracks: 6

Other information
- Station code: 604

History
- Opened: June 28, 1913
- Closed: March 2, 1981
- Electrified: September 3, 1930

Former services
Preceding station	Delaware, Lackawanna and Western Railroad	Following station
Terminus	Montclair Branch	Glen Ridge toward Hoboken
- Montclair Railroad Station
- U.S. National Register of Historic Places
- New Jersey Register of Historic Places
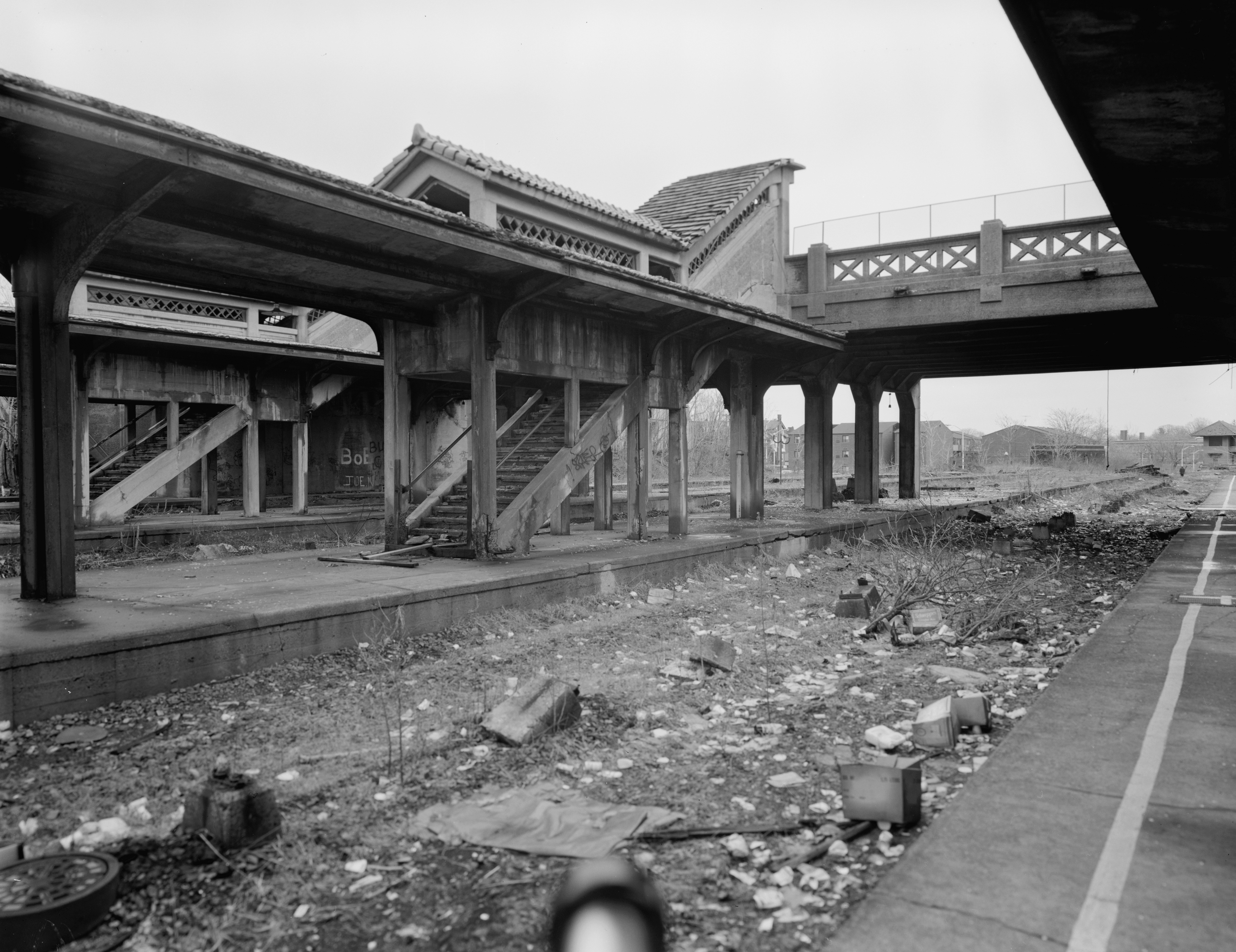
- Abandoned platforms in 1983, with Grove Street Bridge in background.
- Interactive map of Montclair Railroad Station
- Location: Lackawanna Plaza, Montclair, New Jersey
- Area: 1 acre (0.40 ha)
- Built: 1913
- Architect: William Hull Botsford
- Architectural style: Grecian-Doric
- NRHP reference No.: 73001092
- NJRHP No.: 1155

Significant dates
- Added to NRHP: January 8, 1973
- Designated NJRHP: August 7, 1972
Location

Lackawanna Terminal is a former railroad terminal in Montclair, New Jersey. Built in 1913, the station was the western terminal of the Montclair Branch of the Morris and Essex Lines, part of the Delaware, Lackawanna and Western Railroad. The station, boasting four platforms and six tracks, was designed by William Hull Botsford, an architect who died in the sinking of the Titanic on April 15, 1912. The station opened on June 28, 1913, in a grand ceremony in Montclair. The station was used until March 2, 1981, when NJ Transit moved service to a single-platform station at Bay Street. The 1913 station was converted to an enclosed shopping mall and supermarket.

Listed as the Montclair Railroad Station, it was added to the National Register of Historic Places on January 8, 1973, for its significance in architecture and transportation. According to former township historian Jack Chance, the station qualified for three main reasons. One was its architectural significance, including the overall design, the tapestry bond brickwork, the marble concrete trim, the interior brick and tile work and ornamentation, the iron work in the ticket windows. The next factor was the importance of architect Botsford. The third consideration was the station's importance as a transportation center in the history of Montclair Township.

In 1982, an LLC, Montclair Center Associates, redeveloped the property into Lackawanna Plaza, a shopping complex anchored by a Pathmark supermarket. However, in 2015 the Pathmark closed, leading to the building being underutilized once again, leading to further redevelopment proposals starting in 2017.

In 2019, the complex was threatened with demolition. In 2024, a new developer reopened it as a shopping center.

In March 2026, Montclair approved a redevelopment plan which will transform the terminal into residential apartments, commercial space, and a grocery store through the approval of a 30-year PILOT. The redevelopment will include the construction of 5-6 story mixed use buildings, a 40,000 square foot supermarket, 75,000 square feet of office space, and 300 apartments, a portion of which will be affordable. It will also include a parking structure.

== Gallery ==
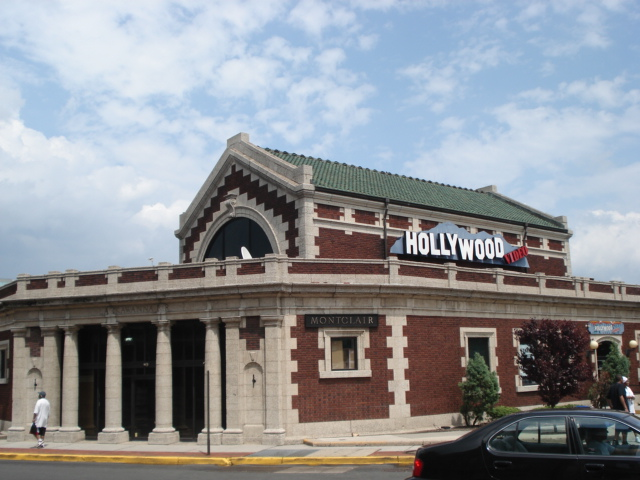
Renovated exterior of terminal in 2008.

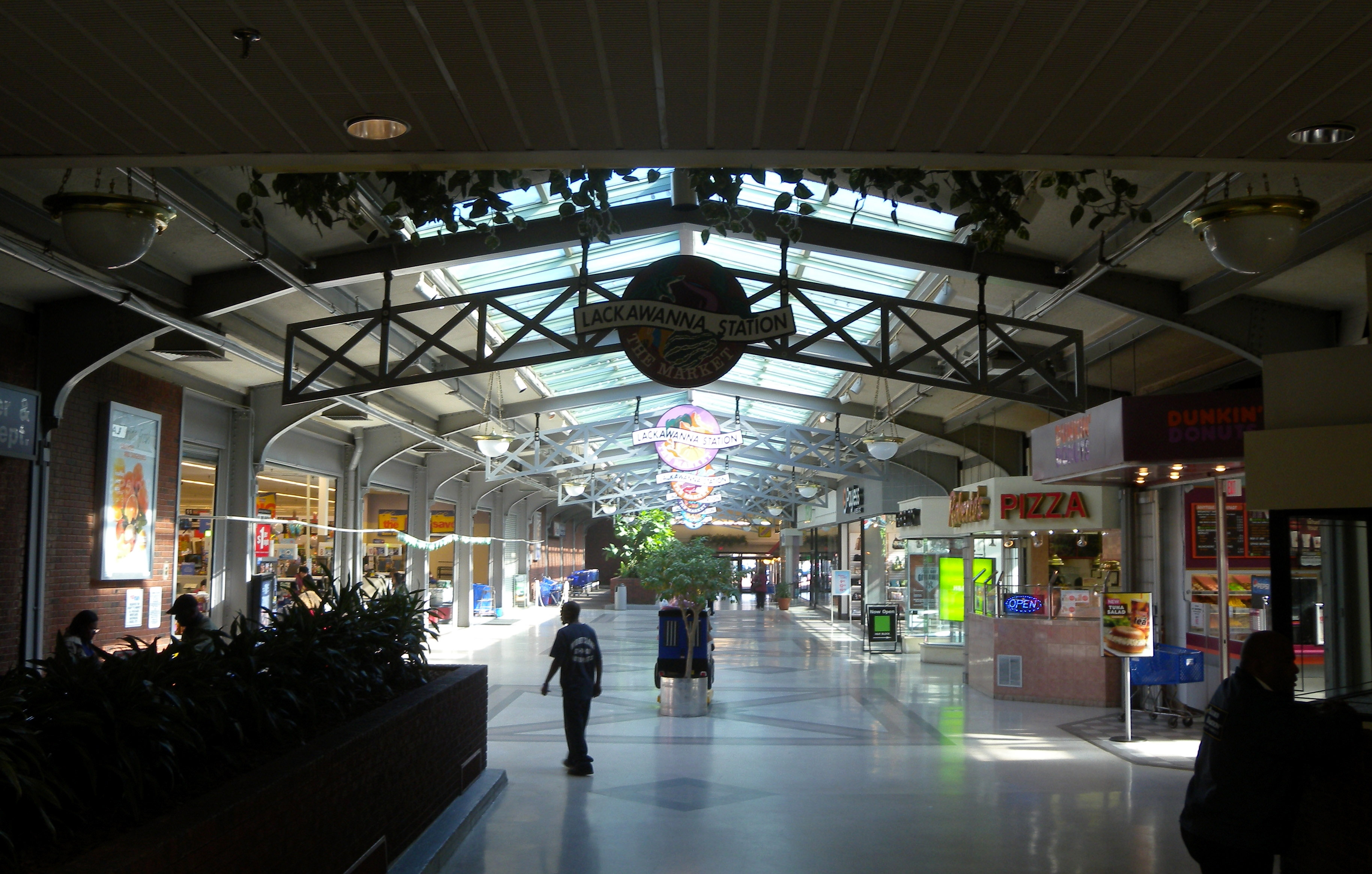
Shopping mall interior in 2010.

== See also ==
- Operating Passenger Railroad Stations Thematic Resource (New Jersey)
- National Register of Historic Places listings in Essex County, New Jersey
