= Bay Street station =

NJ Transit rail station

Bay Street
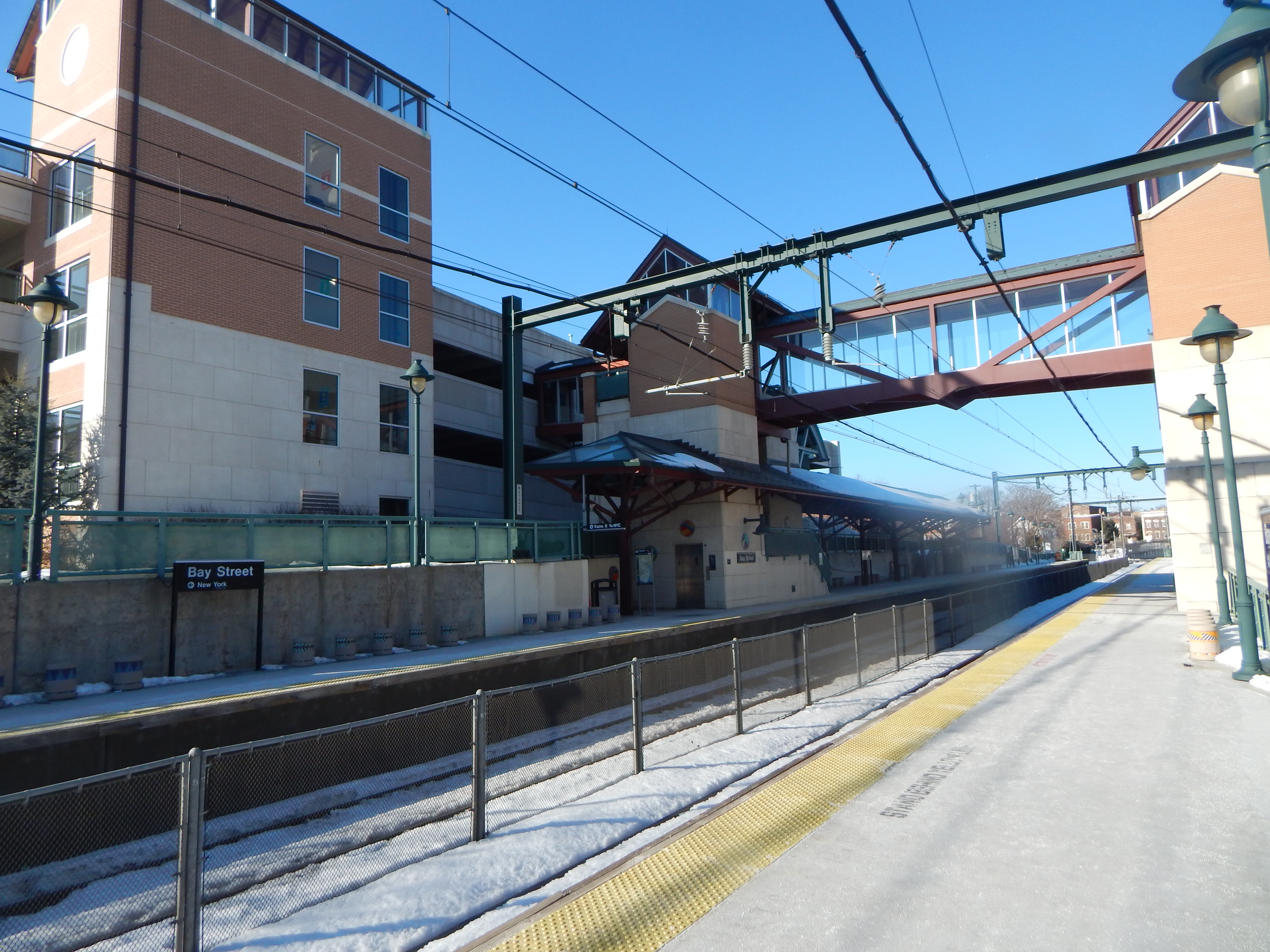
- The station at Bay Street in February 2015.

General information
- Location: 43 Glenridge Avenue; Montclair, New Jersey 07042
- Coordinates: 40.8079°N 74.2089°W
- Owner: New Jersey Transit
- Platforms: 2 high-level side platforms
- Tracks: 2
- Connections: NJ Transit Bus: 11, 28, 29; Montclair Jitney

Construction
- Parking: 248 space parking garage
- Cycle facilities: Racks
- Accessible: yes

Other information
- Fare zone: 5

History
- Opened: March 2, 1981
- Rebuilt: 2002
- Electrified: March 2, 1981

Passengers
- 2025: 1,158 (average weekday)
- Rank: 28 of 153

Services
Preceding station	NJ Transit	Following station
Walnut Street weekdays toward Hackettstown	Montclair–Boonton Line	Glen Ridge toward New York or Hoboken
Former services
Preceding station	NJ Transit	Following station
Terminus	Montclair Branch	Glen Ridge toward Hoboken
Location

Bay Street is an active commuter railroad station in the township of Montclair, Essex County, New Jersey. Despite its name, the station is located on Glenridge Avenue in Montclair, marking the first station outbound and last station of six inbound in the municipality. Bay Street station serves trains of NJ Transit's Montclair–Boonton Line between New York Penn Station and Hackettstown station in Warren County on weekdays. On weekends, Bay Street station serves as the terminus of the line, which operates as a shuttle between Montclair and Hoboken Terminal. Bay Street station has two high-level side platforms connected by an overpass. A parking garage is accessible on Pine Street.

Bay Street station opened on March 2, 1981 as a replacement for the Lackawanna Terminal, which served as the terminus of the Delaware, Lackawanna and Western Railroad's Montclair Branch, a service that operated between Roseville Avenue station in Newark and Montclair. At the time of construction, Bay Street station was a single low-level side platform with shelter. As part of upgrades tied to the construction of the Montclair Connection, which would merge the Montclair Branch and Boonton Line, NJ Transit upgraded the station. Unified service on the Montclair–Boonton Line began on September 30, 2002. Bay Street station was a major part of Montclair being designated as a transit village by the New Jersey Department of Transportation in 2010.

== History ==
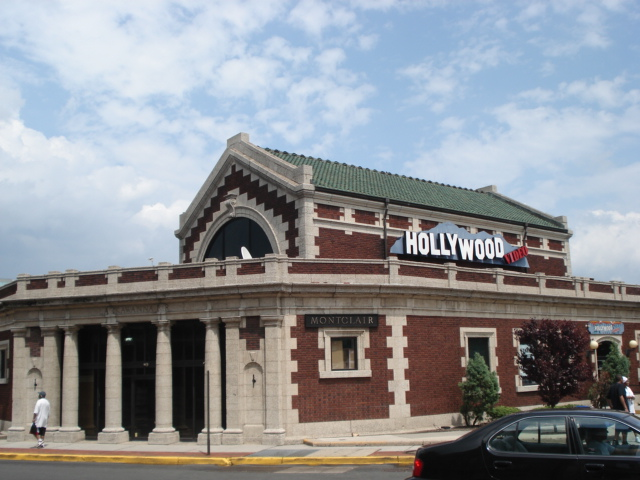
The old Lackawanna Station, now a shopping center

=== Opening ===
The station was built in 1981 to replace Montclair's previous station, Lackawanna Plaza, two blocks to the west of the current station. Lackawanna Plaza (also known as Lackawanna Terminal) was once the grand terminal opened in 1913 by the Delaware, Lackawanna and Western Railroad for its Montclair Branch. The station's usage had been relegated from six tracks served by three platforms to one platform serving one track and the branch had gone from two tracks down to one. The station last served passenger trains on February 26, 1981, and the next day, trains, then operated by Conrail, were realigned to the east in Montclair, serving a new station, named Bay Street. At that time, Bay Street was originally a bare platform with only one track and a small shelter. The realignment was the first phase for the planned Montclair Connection to connect the Montclair Branch to the Boonton Line. This station now served as the terminus of the Montclair Branch, and as a result, the end of electrification.

=== Montclair Connection ===
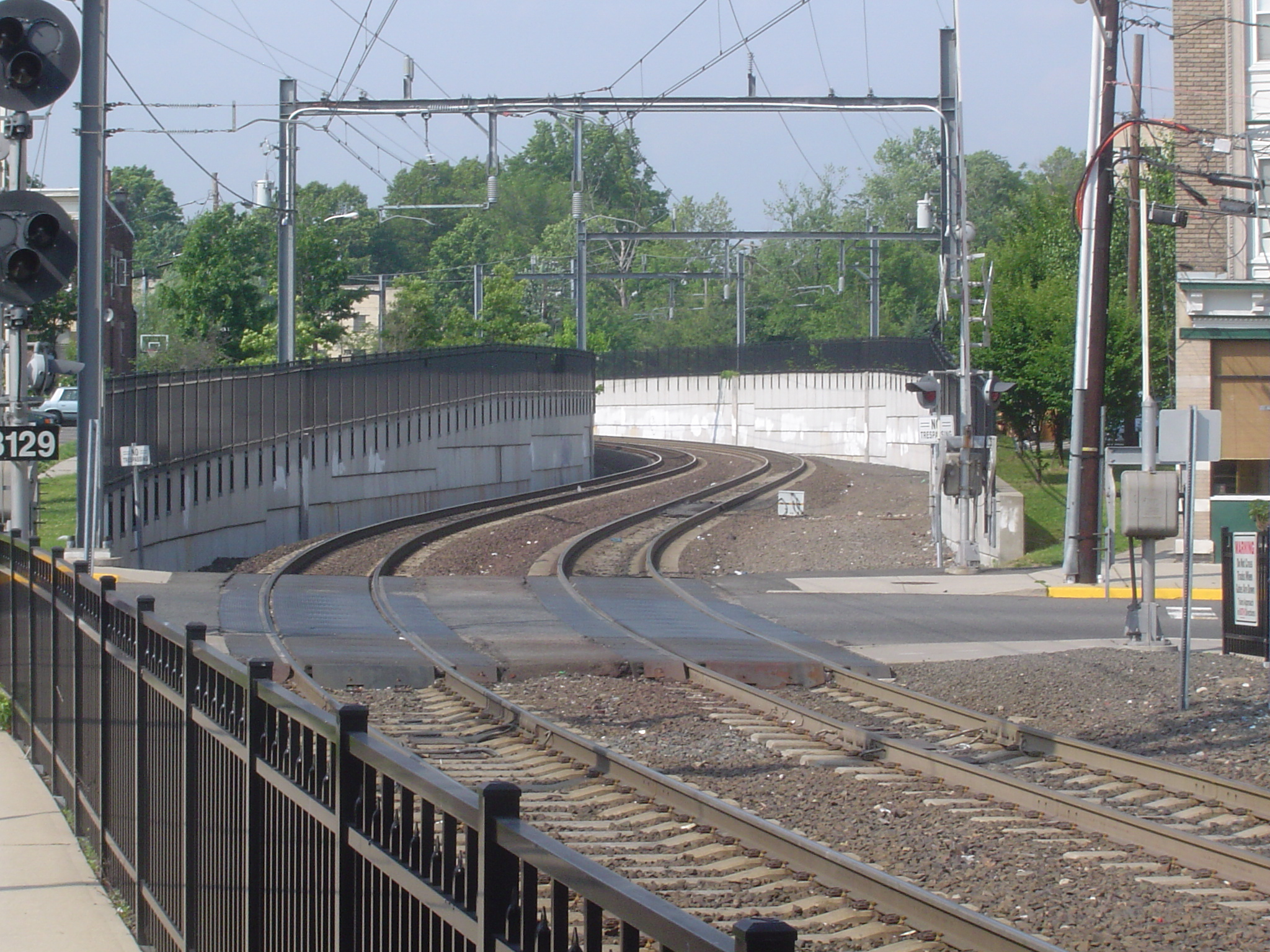
The new track built for the Montclair Connection, viewed from Bay Street station

A long sought connection of train service between the Lackawanna Railroad's Montclair Branch and the Erie Railroad's New York and Greenwood Lake Railroad, which serviced five other stations in Montclair was first proposed in 1929 by the Regional Plan Association. However, the Great Depression shelved any plans to connect the lines. The plan continued to wane for several years until in 1963, when the old Boonton Branch was reconfigured at Mountain View in Wayne, New Jersey to the New York and Greenwood Lake, when revival plans returned. However, the connection continued to be a quiet subject until the late 1980s, when New Jersey Transit revived the proposal. A deal was struck with the township of Montclair in 1998, with a one track connection used for only diesel train sets. However, this proposal was changed into a double track connection with overhead electric catenary wires. Construction on the Montclair Connection began one year later and was completed on September 30, 2002.

As a result of the Montclair Connection, Bay Street station was reconstructed entirely. The lone single platform was removed, rebuilt with two high-level platforms and a large crossover bridge. The shelter was removed and service was expanded full-time in both directions. Rather than being a terminal for trains, trains continued northward to Montclair Heights, where passengers could transfer to other trains.

=== Transit village ===
On July 11, 2010, it was announced by the New Jersey Department of Transportation that Montclair, along with Somerville, had been designated as transit villages. These transit villages are designated to provide residents and people public transit with public services including new residences and stores. Montclair was given high regard for the work done at Bay Street station to make it possible, including a new parking deck, and a complex of seven residential units along Pine Street. These transit villages would also be given a chance to get $100,000 in funding to continue the station's development. Although Montclair's transit village is mostly built at Bay Street, the township also serves five other stations, all in walkable distance from residences.

=== 2025 crash ===
On December 19, 2025, 17 people were injured after two NJ Transit trains collided west of the train station.

== Station layout and services ==
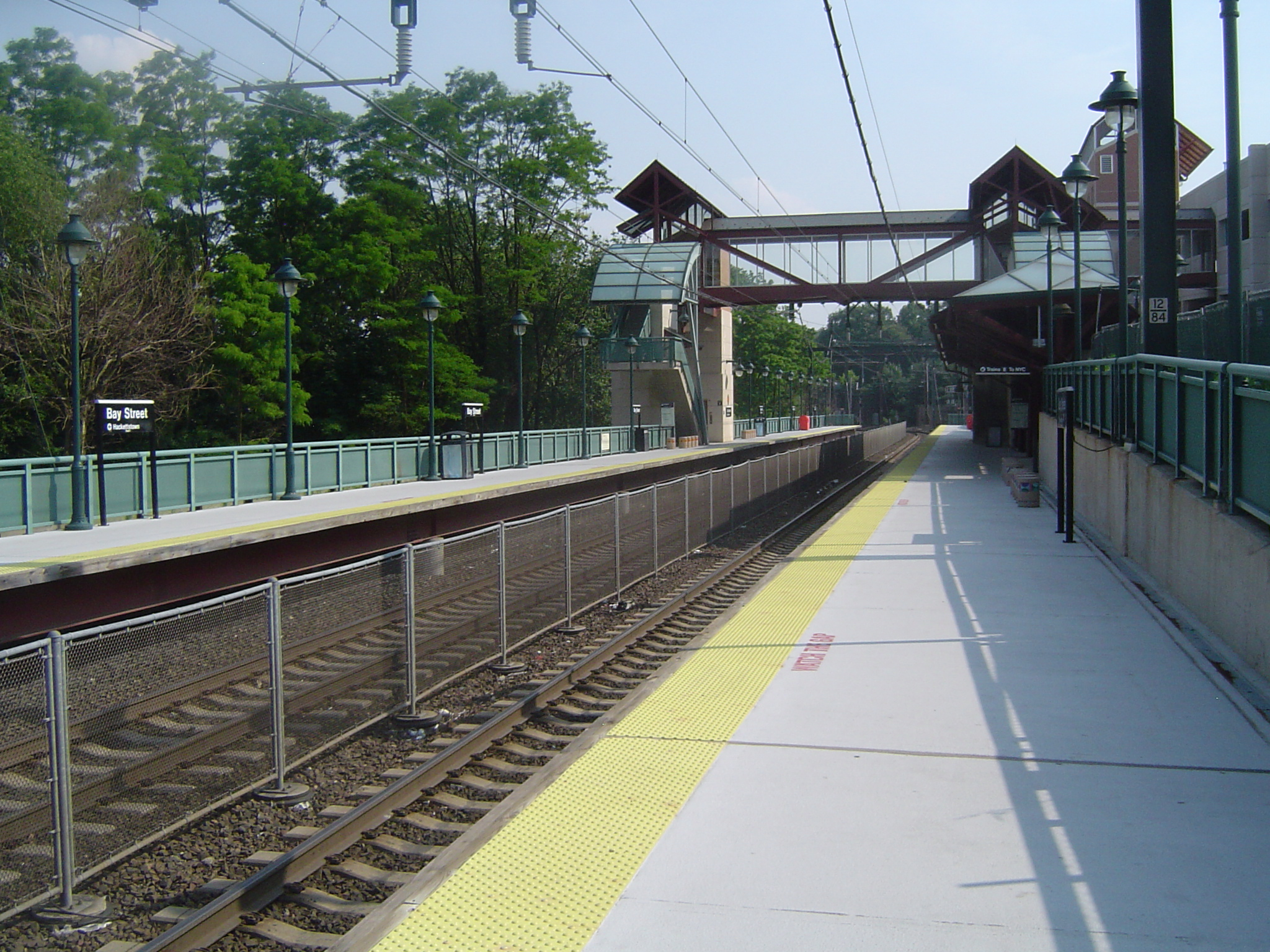
Bay Street station platform, facing southward from Glenridge Avenue

Bay Street station is the first of six stations in the township of Montclair, located on Pine Street between Bloomfield Avenue (County Route 506) and Glenridge Avenue.

The station has two high-level side platforms to serve passengers on its two tracks. The platforms themselves are connected by a crossover bridge with elevators and have ticket vending machines. The station has a 248-space parking garage and a smaller lot a block away. Eight of those spots are handicapped accessible and maintained by the Montclair Parking Authority.

There are continuing maintenance issues regarding the station and parking deck, and neither NJ Transit nor the municipality claim responsibility for the station building.

Bay Street station is a major stop on the Montclair-Boonton Line as every train serving it stops here. This is the terminal for all weekend service except for several special holiday trains that go to Lake Hopatcong station.
