= Murray Hill, New Jersey =

Populated place in Union County, New Jersey, US

- Unincorporated community
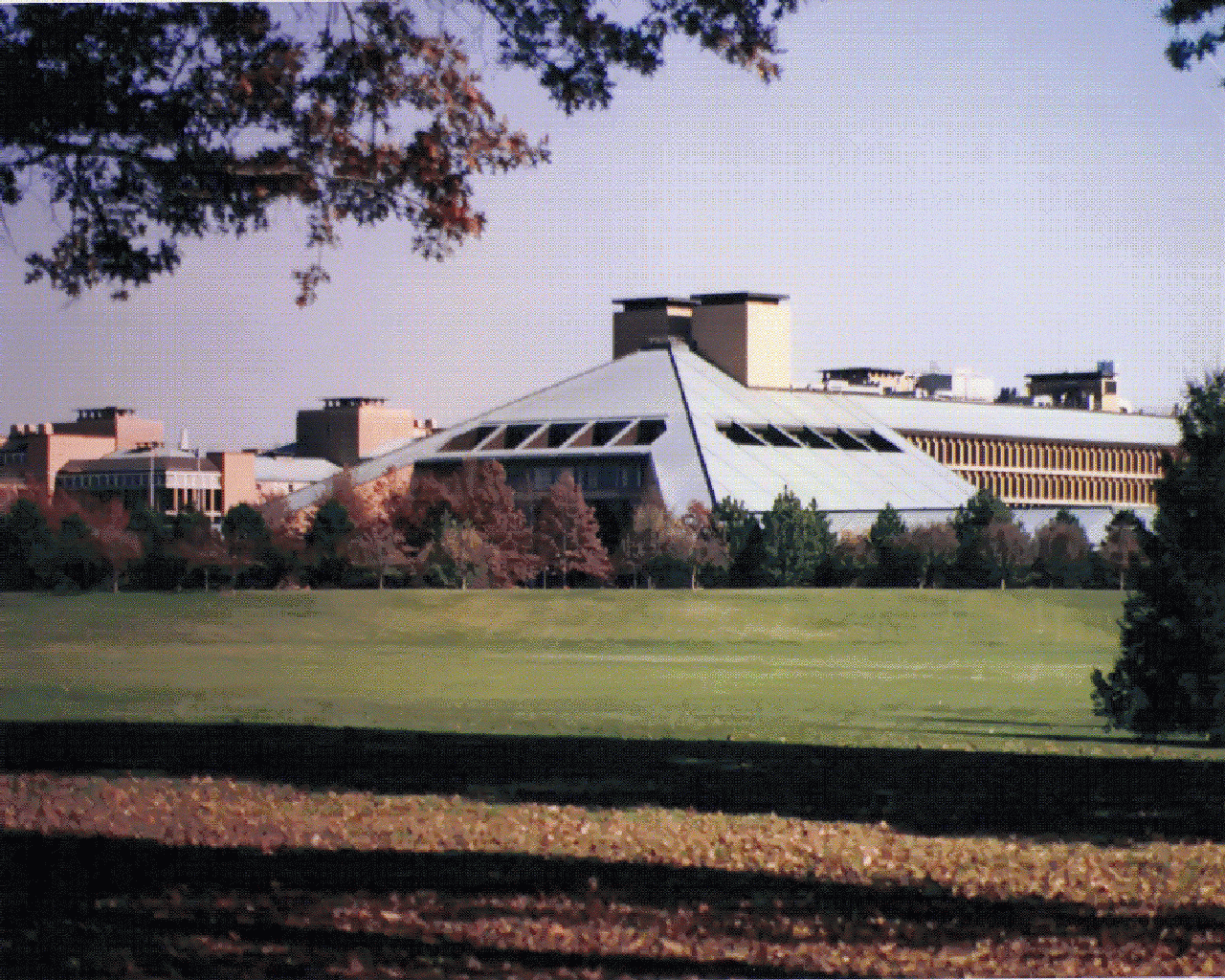
- Bell Labs in Murray Hill

- Location within Union County. Inset: Location of Union County within New Jersey Murray Hill, New Jersey (New Jersey) Murray Hill, New Jersey (the United States)
- Coordinates: 40°41′43″N 74°24′04″W
- Country: United States
- State: New Jersey
- County: Union
- Borough: Berkeley Heights / New Providence
- Elevation: 253 ft (77 m)
- ZIP Code: 07974
- GNIS feature ID: 0878664

Murray Hill is an unincorporated community located within portions of both Berkeley Heights and New Providence, located in Union County, in the northern portion of the U.S. state of New Jersey.

It is the longtime central location of Bell Labs, having moved there in 1941 from nearby New York City. The first working transistor was demonstrated in Bell Labs' Murray Hill facility in 1947.

The neighborhood shares its ZIP Code 07974 with the neighboring borough of New Providence.

Murray Hill was named and founded by Carl H. Schultz, founder of a mineral water business once located on First Avenue between 25th and 26th Streets in the Murray Hill district of Manhattan. Schultz purchased a large tract of land there during the 1880s where he built a residence for his family and donated land to be used for a train station with the condition that the area be known as "Murray Hill".

== Economy ==
Businesses and organizations based in Murray Hill include:

- C. R. Bard, a manufacturer of surgical equipment.
- Bell Labs, pioneering research center that's had nine Nobel Prizes awarded to its work.
- The Linde Group's (formerly The BOC Group) United States headquarters, the world's largest industrial gases company.

== Transportation ==
Mass transit to Murray Hill is available via the New Jersey Transit Gladstone Branch train line to the Murray Hill or Summit stations. Passengers heading to Bell Labs can take the 986 bus route to shuttle between the facility and the train station.

== See also ==
- Passaic River Parkway
