= Maplewood station =

NJ Transit rail station

Coordinates: 40°43′52″N 74°16′32″W

Maplewood
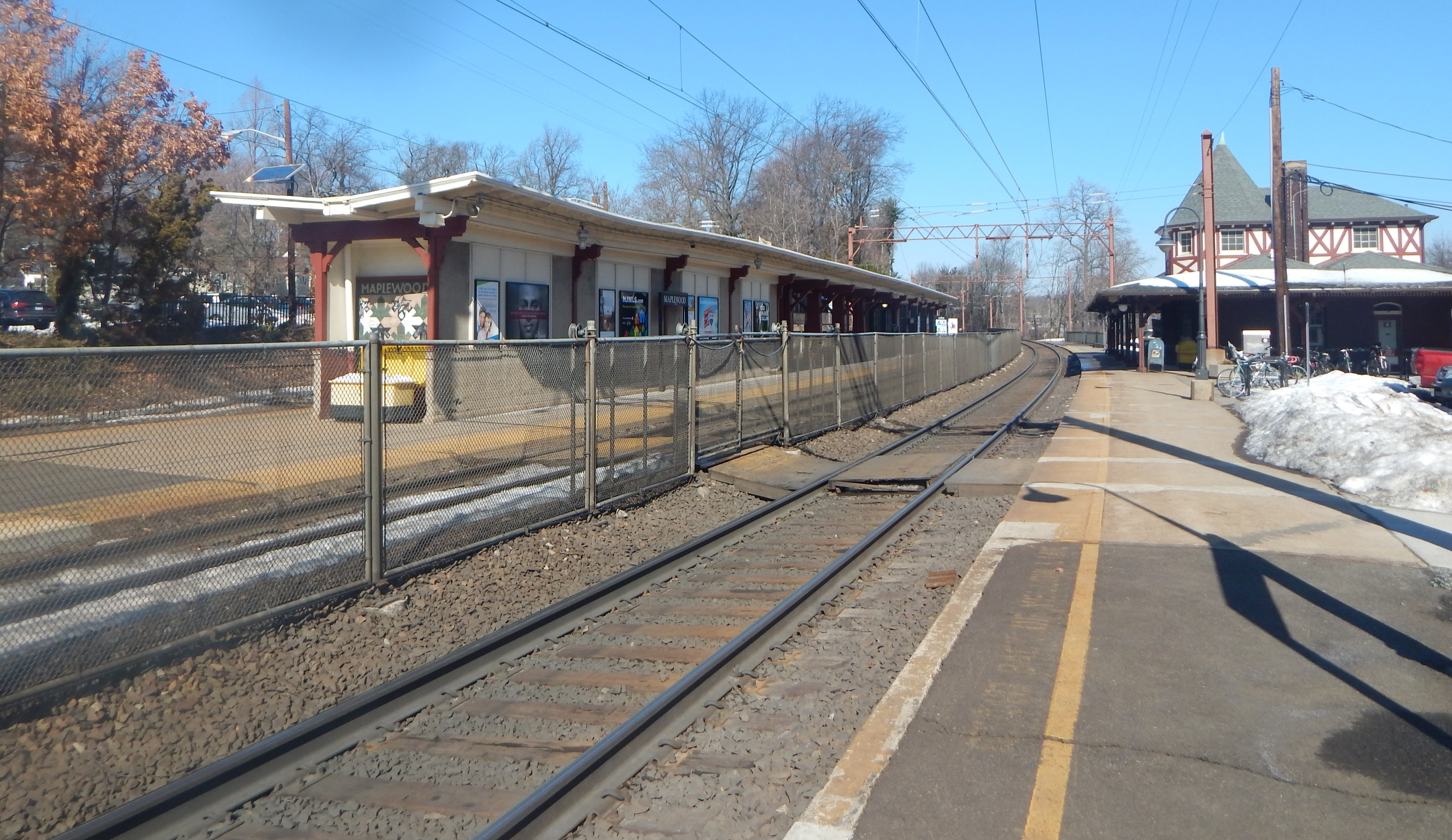
- Maplewood station in March 2015.

General information
- Location: 145 Dunnell Road (at Maplewood Avenue), Maplewood, New Jersey 07040
- Owner: New Jersey Transit
- Platforms: 1 side platform and 1 island platform
- Tracks: 3

Construction
- Cycle facilities: Lockers and racks

Other information
- Fare zone: 6

History
- Opened: September 17, 1837 (preliminary trip); September 28, 1837 (regular service)
- Rebuilt: 1859–1860; 1901–January 1902
- Electrified: December 18, 1930

Passengers
- 2025: 1969 (average weekday)
- Rank: 18 of 153

Services
Preceding station	NJ Transit	Following station
Millburn toward Gladstone	Gladstone Branch weekdays	South Orange toward New York or Hoboken
Millburn toward Hackettstown	Morristown Line	South Orange toward New York or Hoboken
Former services
Preceding station	Delaware, Lackawanna and Western Railroad	Following station
Millburn toward Buffalo	Main Line	South Orange toward Hoboken
Location

Maplewood is a train station that serves New Jersey Transit's Morristown Line and Gladstone Branch (commonly known as the Morris and Essex Lines) in the township of Maplewood, Essex County, New Jersey. Located in "The Village" in Maplewood at 145 Dunnell Road (near the intersection with Maplewood Avenue), the station services trains from New York Penn Station and Hoboken Terminal to the east along with trains to Summit, Dover, Hackettstown and Gladstone to the west.

== History ==
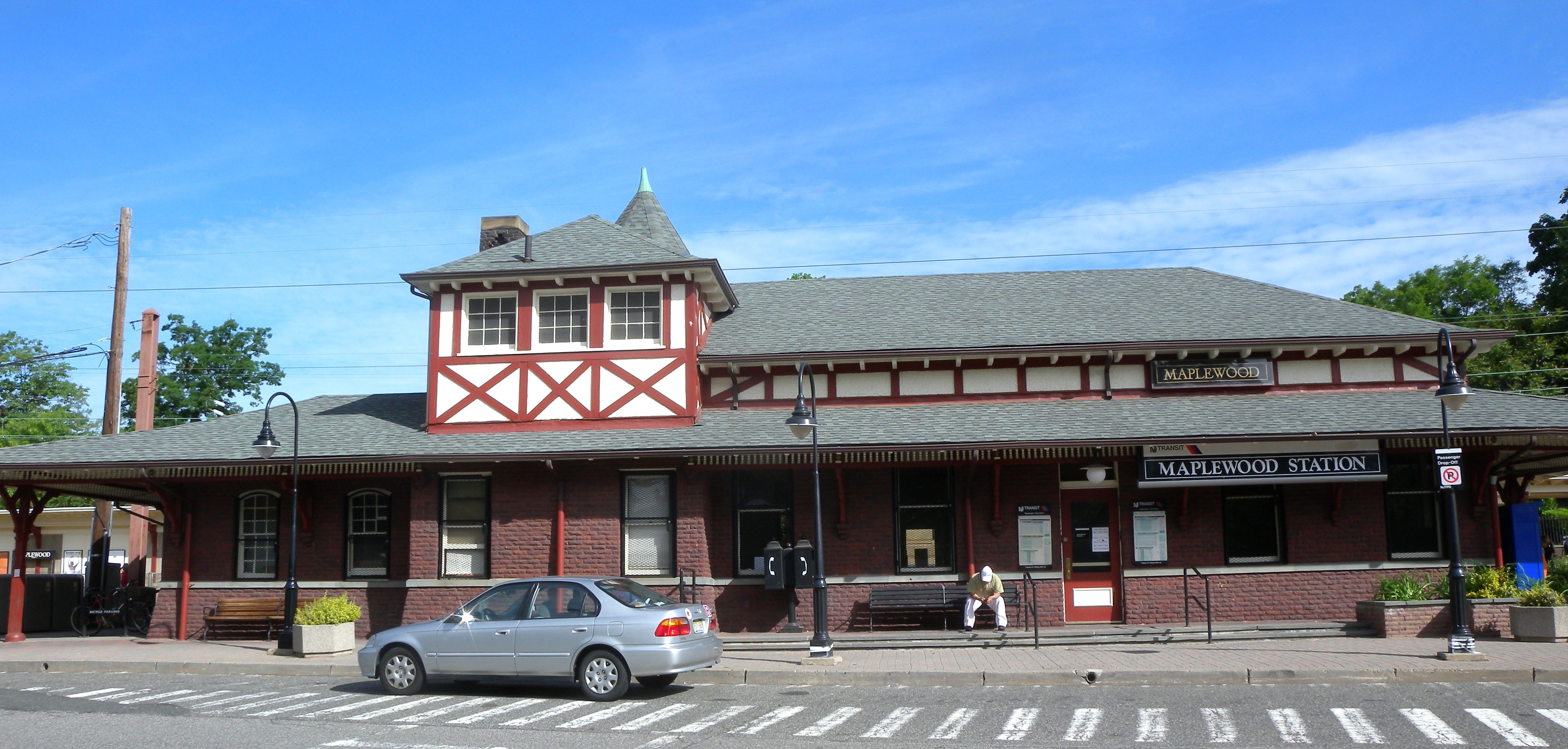
Station house

Service in Maplewood began on September 28, 1837 with the opening of the Morris and Essex Railroad. At that time, service in then-Jefferson Village was limited to a flag stop at the Montgomery–Ogden House on Jefferson Street, a house built in the 18th century. Daniel Beach and his wife bought the property and the kitchen served as the waiting room for trains to stop. Known only as the "Stone House" stop, the name Maplewood was not attached until c. 1860. The Montgomery–Ogden House served as the station until 1859, when a new depot was built by a land speculator at Baker Street and Maplewood Avenue.

The 1860 depot was replaced by the Delaware, Lackawanna and Western Railroad in 1901 with the current structure. Construction finished in January 1902.

== Station layout ==
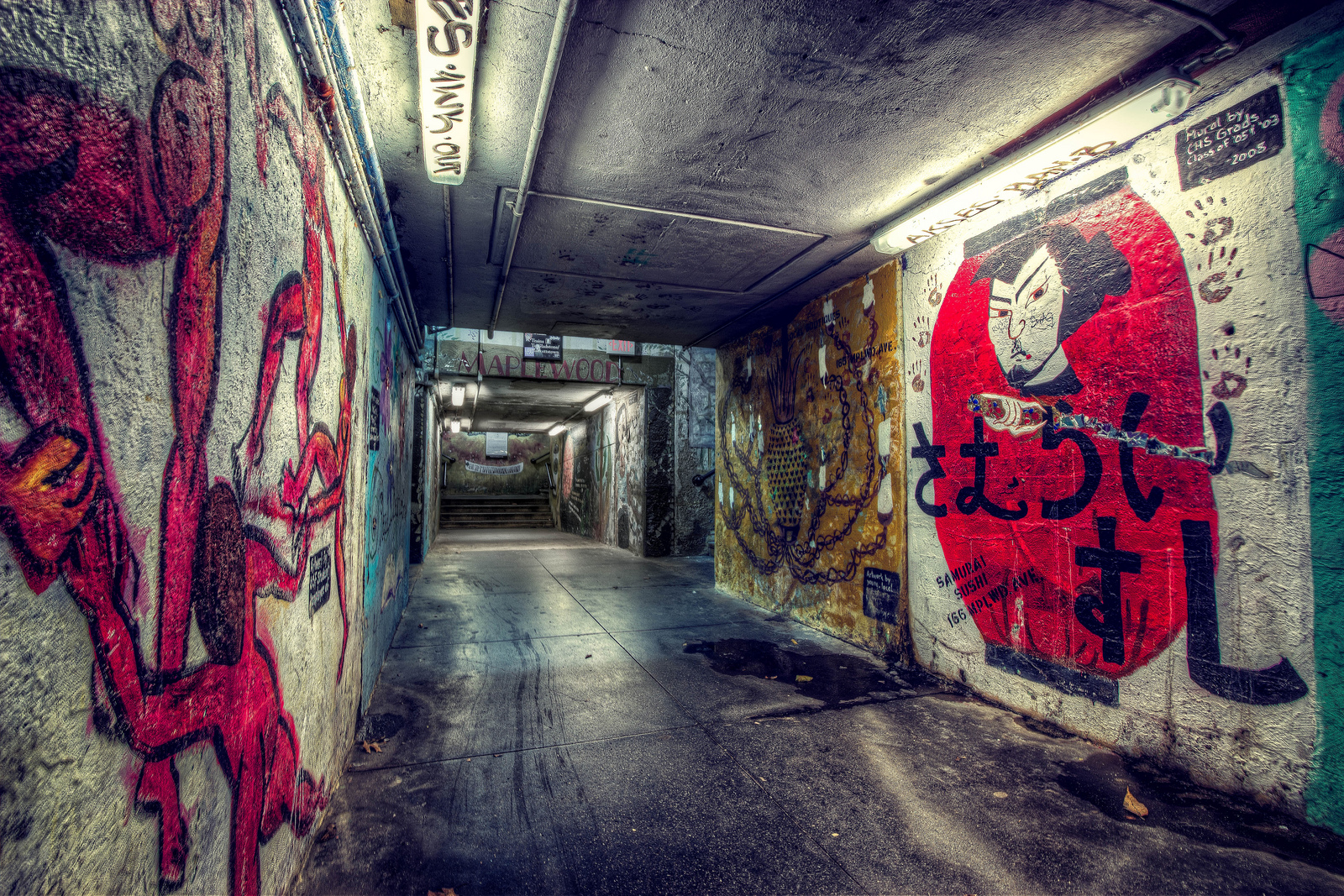
Connecting tunnel between tracks

Parking is available in a small lot just to the east of the station on the eastbound side (Lot 1) and a lot one block west of the station on the westbound side (Lot 4). There are also several signed areas along nearby streets, referred to as Lots 2 and 3.

Parking is restricted to Maplewood residents with permits from 6:00–9:00 a.m. on weekdays or non-permit holders for a $3 fee. At all other times, parking is free of charge, but overnight parking is not allowed. Bicycle lockers are also provided.

The station has two low-level platforms connected by a tunnel. Not all trains stop at this station, and trains may pass through the station on any track.

== Bibliography ==
- Douglass, A.M. (1912). The Railroad Trainman, Volume 29. Cleveland, Ohio: Brotherhood of Railroad Trainmen.
- Walker, Herbert T. (1902). "Early History of the Delaware, Lackawanna & Western Railroad and it's Locomotives - Part 2: The Morris and Essex Railroad". Railroad Gazette. 34.
