= Millburn station =

NJ Transit rail station

Coordinates: 40°43′32.4″N 74°18′13.3″W

Millburn
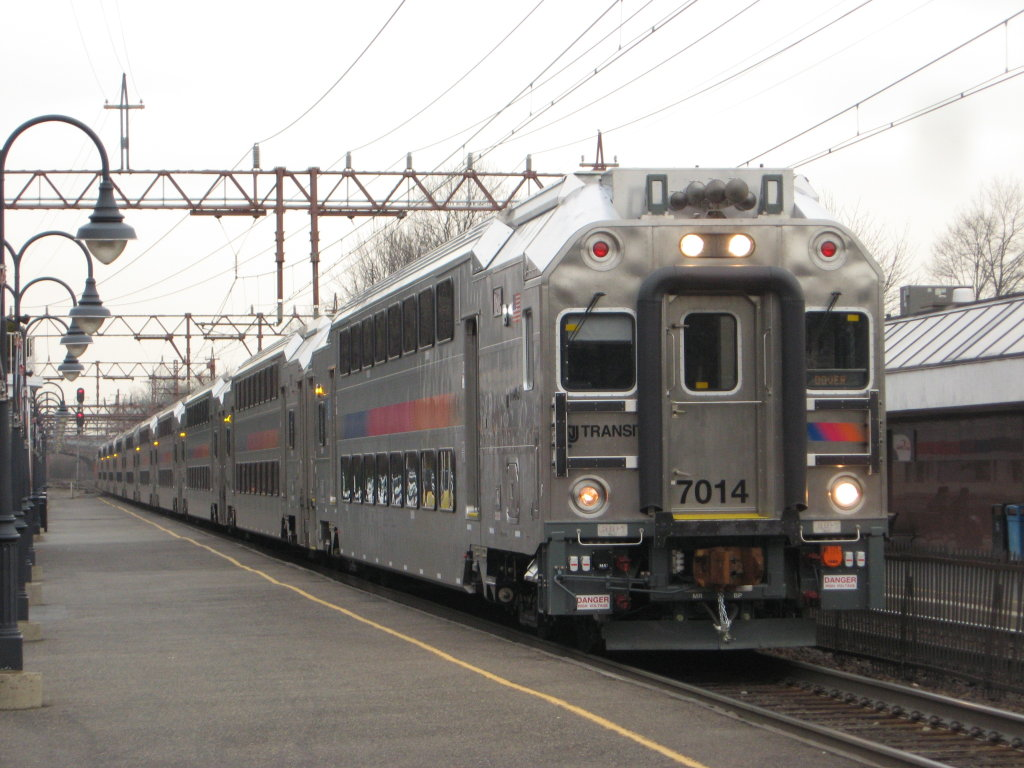
- Dover-bound train stopping at Millburn in 2008

General information
- Location: 35 Essex Street (CR 527), Millburn, New Jersey
- Owner: New Jersey Transit
- Platforms: 2 side platforms
- Tracks: 2
- Connections: NJT Bus: 70

Other information
- Fare zone: 7

History
- Opened: September 17, 1837 (preliminary trip); September 28, 1837 (regular service)
- Rebuilt: December 1986–August 3, 1988
- Electrified: December 18, 1930

Key dates
- 1874: Original station depot burned
- December 1986: Station depot razed

Passengers
- 2025: 1235 (average weekday)
- Rank: 24 of 153

Services
Preceding station	NJ Transit	Following station
Short Hills toward Gladstone	Gladstone Branch weekdays	Maplewood toward New York or Hoboken
Short Hills toward Hackettstown	Morristown Line	Maplewood toward New York or Hoboken
Former services
Preceding station	Delaware, Lackawanna and Western Railroad	Following station
Short Hills toward Buffalo	Main Line	Maplewood toward Hoboken
Location

Millburn is an active commuter railroad station in Millburn Township, Essex County, New Jersey. Serving trains of NJ Transit's Morristown Line and Gladstone Branch, trains operate from New York Penn Station and Hoboken Terminal to points west, including Dover, Gladstone and Hackettstown. The next station to the west is Short Hills while the next station to the east is Maplewood. Millburn station contains two low-level side platforms with two office buildings fronting the structure, a colonial-style building built in 1962 on the westbound tracks and a modern office building on the eastbound tracks built in 1987. The station also has a ticket agency with a waiting room.

The area known as Millburn gained railroad service on September 28, 1837 with the extension of the Morris and Essex Railroad from Orange to Madison. The original station building burned in 1874, replaced by the freight station until 1907, when the Delaware, Lackawanna and Western Railroad built a new station. The construction of the new station in 1907 resulted in the abandonment of the station at Wyoming in the township on November 10, 1907. Local development projects resulted in both station depots being demolished, with Frank Donnelly demolishing the westbound station for a two-story office building in 1962 and P&R Associates demolishing the eastbound structure for its building in December 1986. The current eastbound station opened on August 3, 1988.

== History ==
=== Construction (1837–1907) ===
Service in the area of Springfield Township in then-Union County began on September 17, 1837 when the "Orange", a locomotive operated by the Morris and Essex Railroad, began a test trip between Newark and Madison. This train was a single locomotive and two cars. Permanent service between the two municipalities began on September 28, 1837 and a station was established as Millville. Millville station stood next to a pond, where the "Orange" would take water due to the railroad being at a low enough level. However, railroad crews discovered that the locomotive could not maintain sufficient steam for the heavy load of water and this was replaced by a water pump machine at Summit.

Construction of the Morris and Essex through Millville helped influence development. Prior to the construction of the railroad, Millville had a few local businesses, residences and a paper mill. With the railroad, more direct delivery options were made for the paper mills to send their wares to Elizabeth, New Jersey and New York City that were previously sent by sloops. The railroad turned the paper mills into the principal industry of the area and development grew around the new paper mills.

The railroad station built at Millville, which became Millburn Township in 1857, burned in a fire in 1874. The depot was replaced by the freight station, built in 1855 by entrepreneur Jonathan Parkhurst to protect his paper products from the mills. This wooden structure was converted into a passenger station. Deferred maintenance led to the depot becoming an eyesore in the municipality with the station not being washed save for the John L. Sullivan appearance in 1886.

The new station at Millburn opened on November 10, 1907. The original plans were for the 11:20 a.m. would be the first train to use the new station, but an unrelated accident of the 11:50 p.m. Saturday train on November 9 caused a change in the plans. The damaged train worked its way through Millburn and attempted to take a switch 100 feet (30 m) west of the station, derailed and the caused the train to stop at the new platform, becoming the new first train at the station. The construction of the new station resulted in the closure of the Wyoming station, leaving an inconvenience to the passengers due to the lack of direct access to the new Millburn station. However, plans were in motion to make a connection to the Laurel Street section of Wyoming to the new Millburn station. The Lackawanna installed a new sidewalk along the road paralleling the tracks to help Wyoming residents reach the new station. Both stations were made of brick; the eastbound station being 28 by 73 feet (8.5 m × 22.3 m) in size and the westbound one being 16 by 60 feet (4.9 m × 18.3 m). The station also had a 32-by-117-foot (9.8 m × 35.7 m) freight house.

The closure of Wyoming station drew local opposition. After sending a letter to the railroad, the Lackawanna sent residents of Wyoming that there were benefits of the newly rebuilt Millburn station and that they would not work harder on improving access to the Wyoming neighborhood. The newly-formed Wyoming Association came together in January 1908 as part of a response to the closure of Wyoming station. Their committee on transportation focused on getting a reversal of the closure. They attended a hearing of the Board of Public Utility Commissioners in Trenton on March 3. The Commissioners ordered the railroad to re-open Wyoming station and a new train station.

However, the railroad ignored the order from the Board to restore service at Wyoming. The process was followed by delays from the railroad, who in 1910 filed a petition to reverse the order, despite never actually restoring service. A new hearing was held in Newark on June 10, 1910 to determine if people in Wyoming wanted to continue to have service restored. Despite heavy support from residents of Wyoming at the meeting, the railroad was granted the right to not restore the station. As a result, the Wyoming Association asked that the depot be removed and the land on it become part of the park surrounding the structure. The railroad removed the station c. May 1912.

=== Fatal wreck (1941) ===
Millburn station became the site of a fatal wreck by a Lackawanna train on August 17, 1941. A locomotive heading from Dover to Orange with three full milk cars and two empty passenger cars lost control. The engine derailed on a sharp curve east of the station and fell on its side onto the other tracks. The out of control locomotive then skidded down the tracks into the westbound station's platform. The locomotive also struck a concrete overpass and sending chunks of concrete into the road. One of the passenger cars also continued with the engine, toppling over and landing behind the locomotive. The rest of the cars piled up on the tracks further back, tearing up and blocking the tracks in every direction.

Local firefighters hosed down the steam engine, but the locomotive never had its boiler explode. The firefighters then pulled the fireman from the locomotive, where he had a leg completely severed, leading to his death. The engineer was on one of the station platforms and promptly sent to Irvington General Hospital. Doctors diagnosed him with several fractured bones, cuts and bruises. They continued to wash down small fires that occurred from the accident, including flaming railroad ties and putting water in the boiler to prevent an explosion. Local residents chipped in to keep the firefighters fed.

The Lackawanna Railroad came in overnight to clean up the mess, which eliminated all train traffic through Millburn. All through traffic would be rerouted via the Boonton Branch until service could be restored. Over 100 workmen and three railroad cranes came to clean the wreckage. Work was enough to start partial service on the line as of August 18, but the railroad provided shuttle busses to help get around the Millburn wreckage. Several commuters took their personal car to Maplewood and South Orange stations to get to their train. The milk company that had the three full cars, Becker Company, also removed their bottles and cans from the cars to make the deliveries the morning run on August 18.

The railroad cleared the entire wreckage and replaced the tracks around midnight on August 19. The engine and its damaged cars were moved to a siding near Millburn station and it was eventually hauled. The engine had been replaced on the center track to allow the westbound track to reopen. Regular operation through Millburn began again late on August 19.

=== Replacing the stations (1961–1988) ===
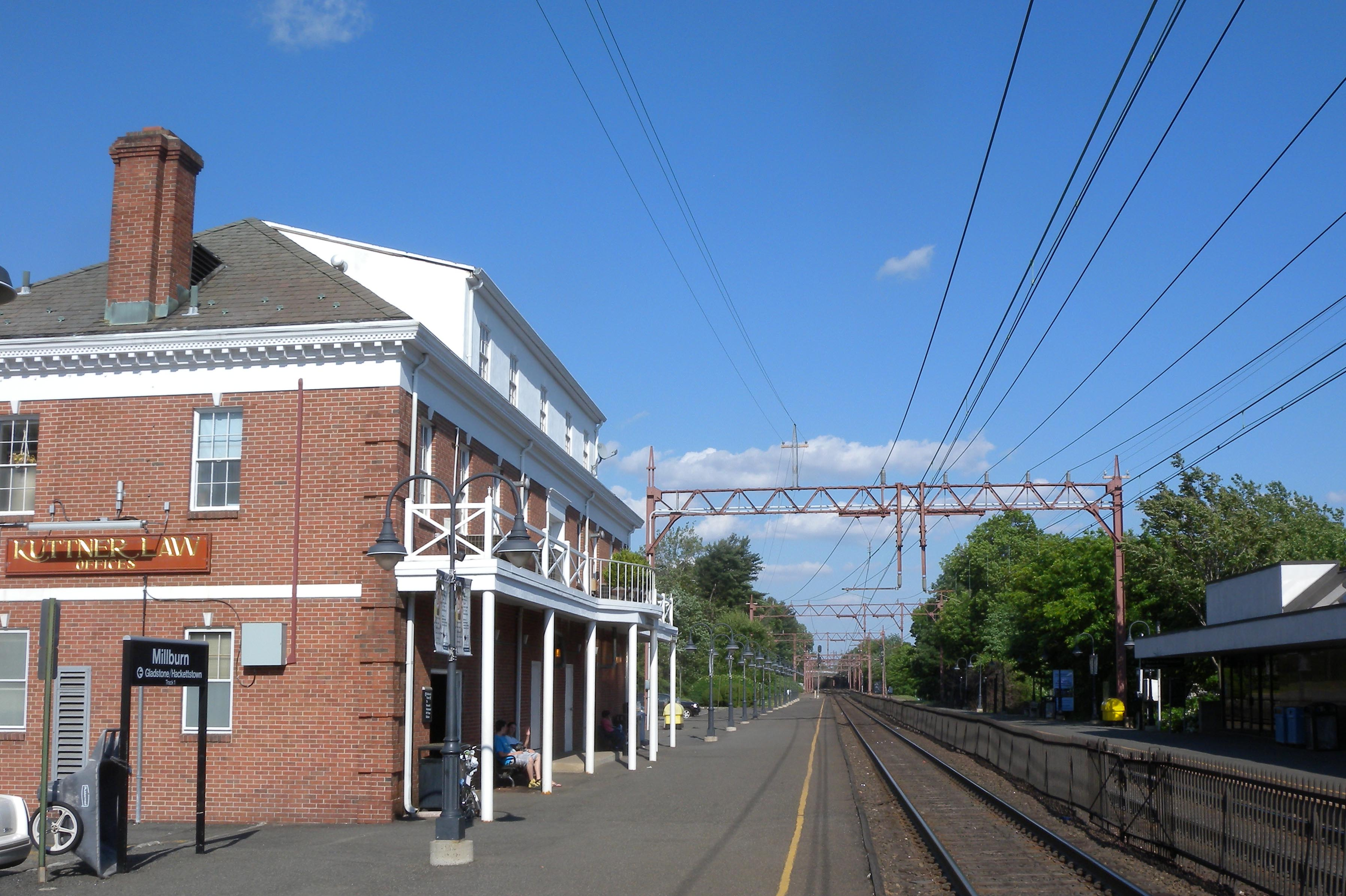
The 1962-built office building that supplanted the former westbound station

In October 1961, Frank G. Donnelly, Inc. of Sagamore Road in Millburn worked on purchasing the Millburn station depot on the eastbound tracks from the Erie-Lackawanna Railroad. By doing so, Donnelly proposed that he would build a new 185 feet (56 m)-long commercial building that would surround the depot, enveloping the old structure in its design. The new structure would also get a circular driveway that would help with commuters and taxis at Millburn station, with an arcade provided to protect commuters from the elements. It would also including space for 70 new parking spaces in Millburn. The Millburn Township Board of Adjustment approved the proposal, noting that the station, in bad condition from deferred maintenance, would get more improvements from Donnelly than it would from the railroad. Donnelly also applied to have a second building constructed at the station, this time for the westbound platform. This was due to a request from officials of Millburn Township who asked if Donnelly would improve the westbound platform. This new building would be a colonial three-story structure, two of which would provide office space for Millburn businesses and the third room would be a full recreation room for employees.

Construction began in late March 1962 of the new building on the westbound platform, which would also become the headquarters for Donnelly Bros., moving from Newark to Millburn to occupy the westbound platform building. Donnelly stated that he hoped the westbound structure would be completed to the point that on July 1, so railroad officials and passengers could utilize the first story as a waiting room and ticket office. Demolition of the westbound station depot occurred on March 30, 1962. The new office building on the westbound station opened on November 16, 1962. The building contained the requested waiting room and as part of deeding the property to Donnelly Bros., the railroad requested that the company maintain the pedestrian tunnel between the two structures.

Despite Donnelly's proposals, the reconstruction of the eastbound station depot never occurred in 1962. In July 1973, Donnelly went back to the township with a new proposal that would make a new building of 3.5 stories. The township agreed to it on the condition the beech tree on the property be maintained, because it was considered a municipal landmark. However, Donnelly's firm fell into receivership through bankruptcy in 1976. That year, Marc Berson of Millburn Station Ltd purchased the structure from Donnelly. Instead of Donnelly's 1973 proposal, Berson suggested a new colonial structure and a parking deck replacing a gas station at Essex Street and Lackawanna Place, a proposal that was rejected.

The project would be held off until July 1980, approved a new structure designed by Michael Graves of Princeton that Berson requested. This new one would keep the current railroad station but have a two-story structure built at the western end of the depot. This would result in the elimination of the beech tree, a decision objected by several local interest groups. However, the project continued in a non-started state due to lack of financial interest by Berson. By August 1983, right before the permits were set to expire, Berson's firm cut down the tree and announced that he was working on selling the property to P&R Associates and requested an extension on the permits. The sale and extension were agreed to in September, moving the expiration date of the project to December 31. P&R purchased the depot for $250,000, paid for as part of a $1.5 million loan from the Essex County Improvement Authority.

P&R returned to the township in April 1984 and offered a new proposal that added a third story to the original Berson project. The township rejected the proposal two months later. In July 1984, P&R approached the township instead and offered to demolish the eastbound station and build a new building entirely, two stories tall. The structure would include offices, a bank with drive-up service and a new waiting room for railroad commuters. However, in August, closed door meetings were held between NJ Transit, state and local politicians to purchase the station from P&R and that NJ Transit would offer money if the township acquired the station. P&R's proposal was approved by the township in September 1984. However, Mayor Robert Denise announced in November 1984 to acquire the station from P&R and offered the firm $302,500 for the structure, along with a $300,000 grant for the rehabilitation from NJ Transit.

P&R, armed with an appraisal, stated that the station was worth $1–$1.2 million and that the municipality would also have to pay another $1.6 million for accessibility and restoration. In January 1985, Millburn Township filed to condemn property from P&R, to which the latter filed a lawsuit to stop the condemnation process. Before the hearing in June 1985, P&R dropped the lawsuit and in September, the two sides agreed to hire a private person to be an arbitrator between the two sides.

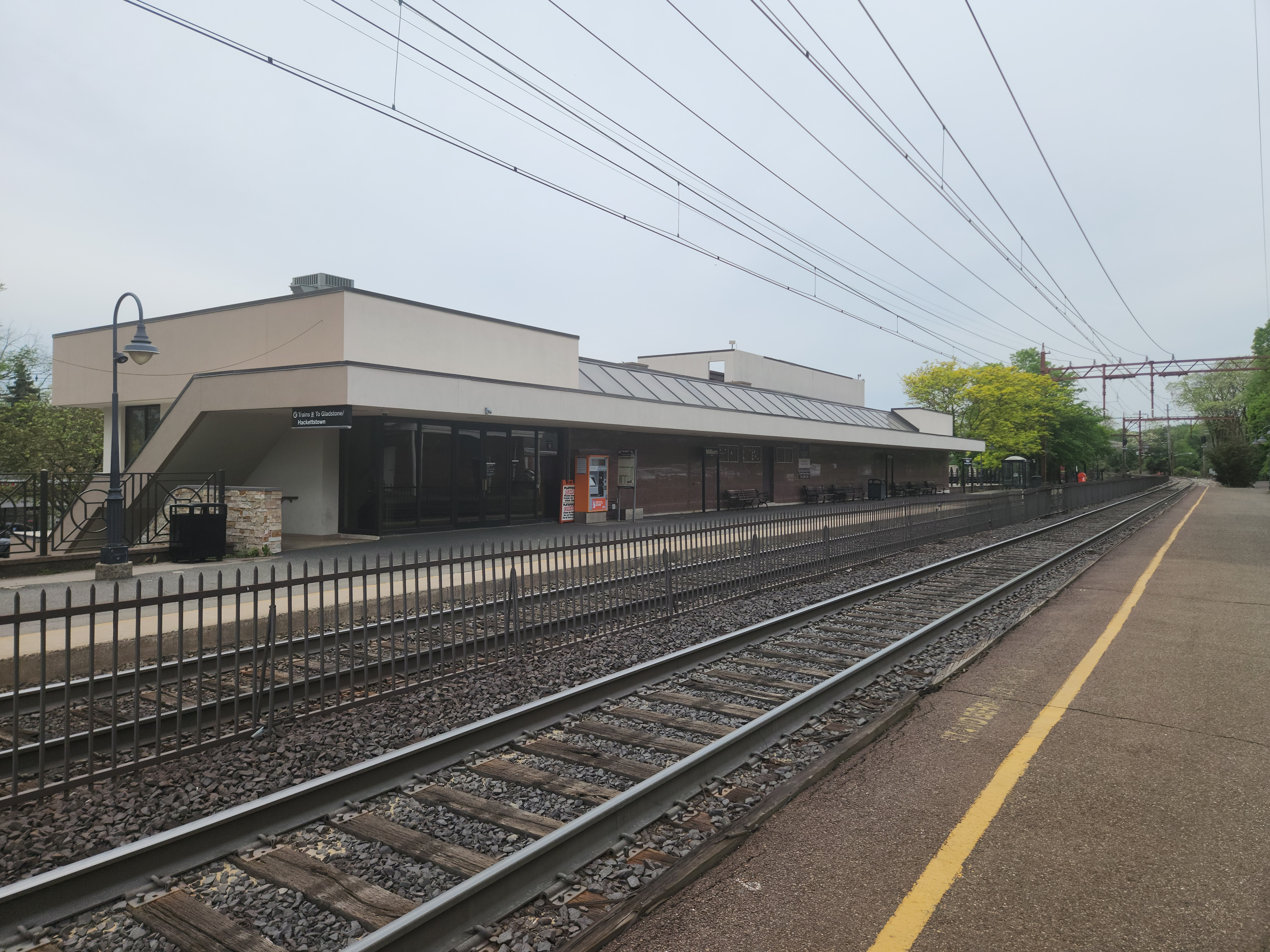
Millburn station's eastbound building, built in 1987, seen in April 2023

However, the lawsuit came to an end on March 19, 1986 with a deal between the two feuding parties. Millburn Township would dismiss the lawsuit and P&R would let the municipality use the Essex Street side of the property as a municipal metered parking lot. The municipality would get a $70,000 payment from P&R to enlarge the lot on Glen Avenue. Millburn Township would rent the Essex Street lot for $1 through 1998, which would make room for 28 parking spaces. P&R would be required to pave the lot, but the municipality would become the permanent maintainer of the lot. P&R would get their structure, a new two-story granite office building of 13,707 square feet (1,273.4 m^{2}) in size. The structure would include the home office of P&R's parent firm, Peters Rickel and Co. of Union Township, the ticket office and waiting room, along with the bank branch. The agreement added that each party would be required to pay their own legal bills. The municipality approved the deal on March 25.

P&R announced in June 1986 that the bids would be returned by July 2, which would be followed by municipal agreement via the Planning Board. The speculated date of opening would be in 1987. However, the start of the construction was delayed due to Essex County wanting 26 feet (7.9 m) more right-of-way on Essex Street. The county stated that P&R would need to hand over 13 feet (4.0 m) before it would approve the new structure, a decision appealed by P&R. P&R agreed to the plans after a September 18 hearing and the entire project was waiting for final approval of the Millburn Planning Board. P&R already acquired the permits for demolition of the depot, began negotiations with NJ Transit about detours for construction and hired a firm to build the structure. The Planning Board made a final approval on November 5.

The original demolition of the eastbound station would be November 10 through equipment from Paley Construction Company, but leaves falling on the tracks caused delays due to the oil on the tracks. Demolition began in December 1986.

The building was finished by July 1988, except that the station opening ceremonies were held up by NJ Transit losing their ticket agent at Millburn to American Airlines. Due to the change in ticket agents, the trailer that had been serving as the station agency and the new building were both closed until the scenario was resolved. The station opened on August 3 when Leonard Pagano of Stanhope became the ticket agent at the new station, moving from his assignment at Maplewood station, returning to the station he worked in 1973.

== Station layout and facility ==
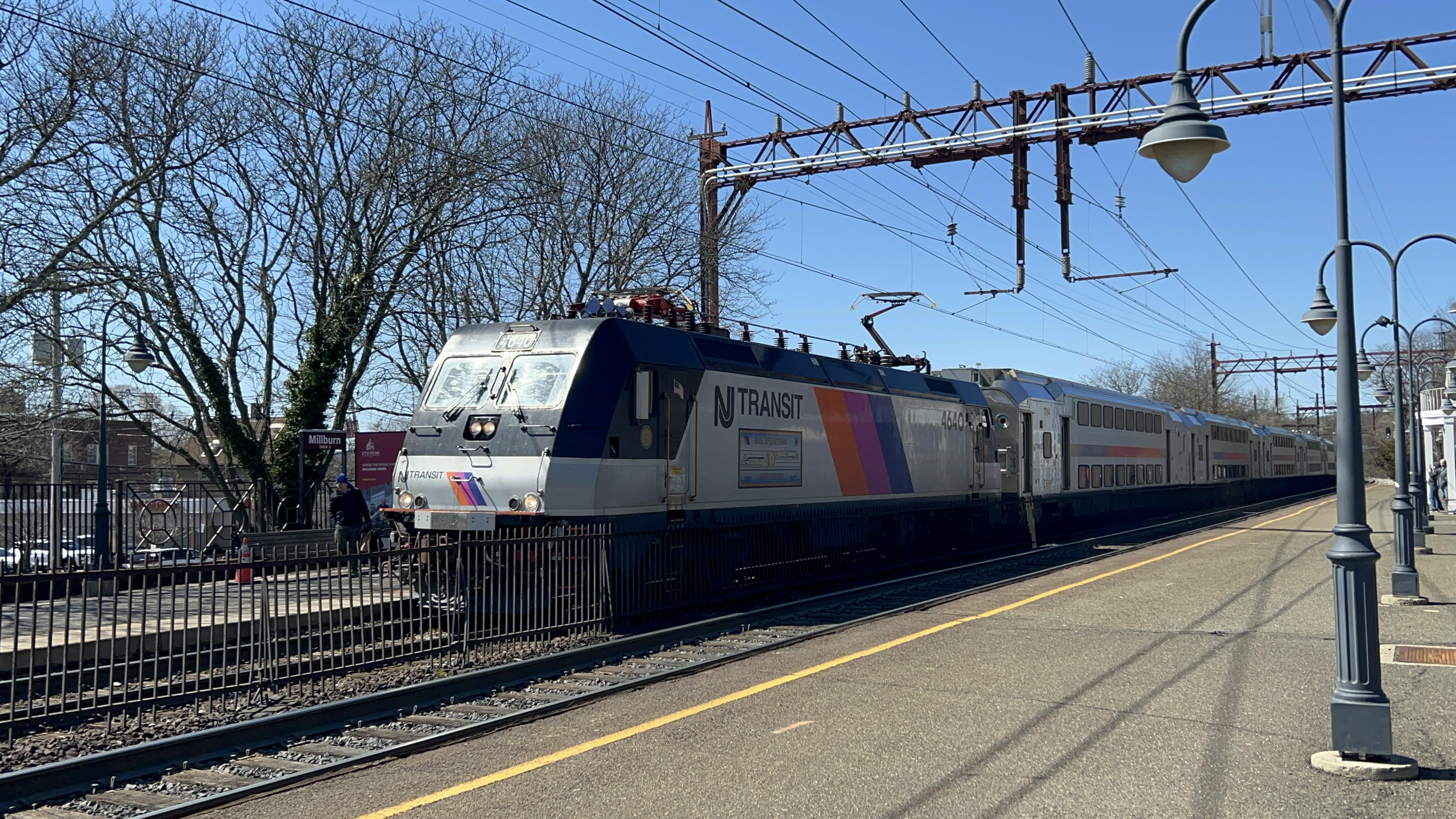
A Bombardier ALP-46 leading an NJ Transit train at Millburn in August 2024

Millburn station contains two low-level side platforms, and offers a ticket office on the outbound platform that is open during morning rush hour. The station also has a single ticket vending machine located outside next to the ticket office. Millburn station contains four public parking lots, maintained by Millburn Township. Lot 1 is located at the junction of Glen Avenue and Lackawanna Place, containing 325 spaces and four handicap spaces. Parking is permit for residents and free after 6:00 p.m. Lot 3 is also at Glen and Lackawanna, containing 114 spaces and four handicap accessible spots. Lot 4 is at the junction of Essex and Main Street with 97 spots and one of which is accessible. Lot 5 contains the last 40, with three extra spots for the handicapped.

Millburn station, along with the next station at Short Hills are both in NJ Transit's fare zone 7.

== Bibliography ==
- Douglass, A.M. (1912). The Railroad Trainman, Volume 29. Cleveland, Ohio: Brotherhood of Railroad Trainmen.
- New Jersey State Board of Assessors (1915). Annual Report of the State Board of Assessors of the State of New Jersey For the Year 1914. Paterson, New Jersey: News Printing Company.
- Shaw, William H. (1884). History of Essex and Hudson Counties, New Jersey. Philadelphia, Pennsylvania: Everts & Peck.
- Walker, Herbert T. (1902). "Early History of the Delaware, Lackawanna & Western Railroad and its Locomotives - Part 2: The Morris and Essex Railroad". Railroad Gazette. 34.
