= Murray Hill station (NJ Transit) =

NJ Transit rail station

Murray Hill
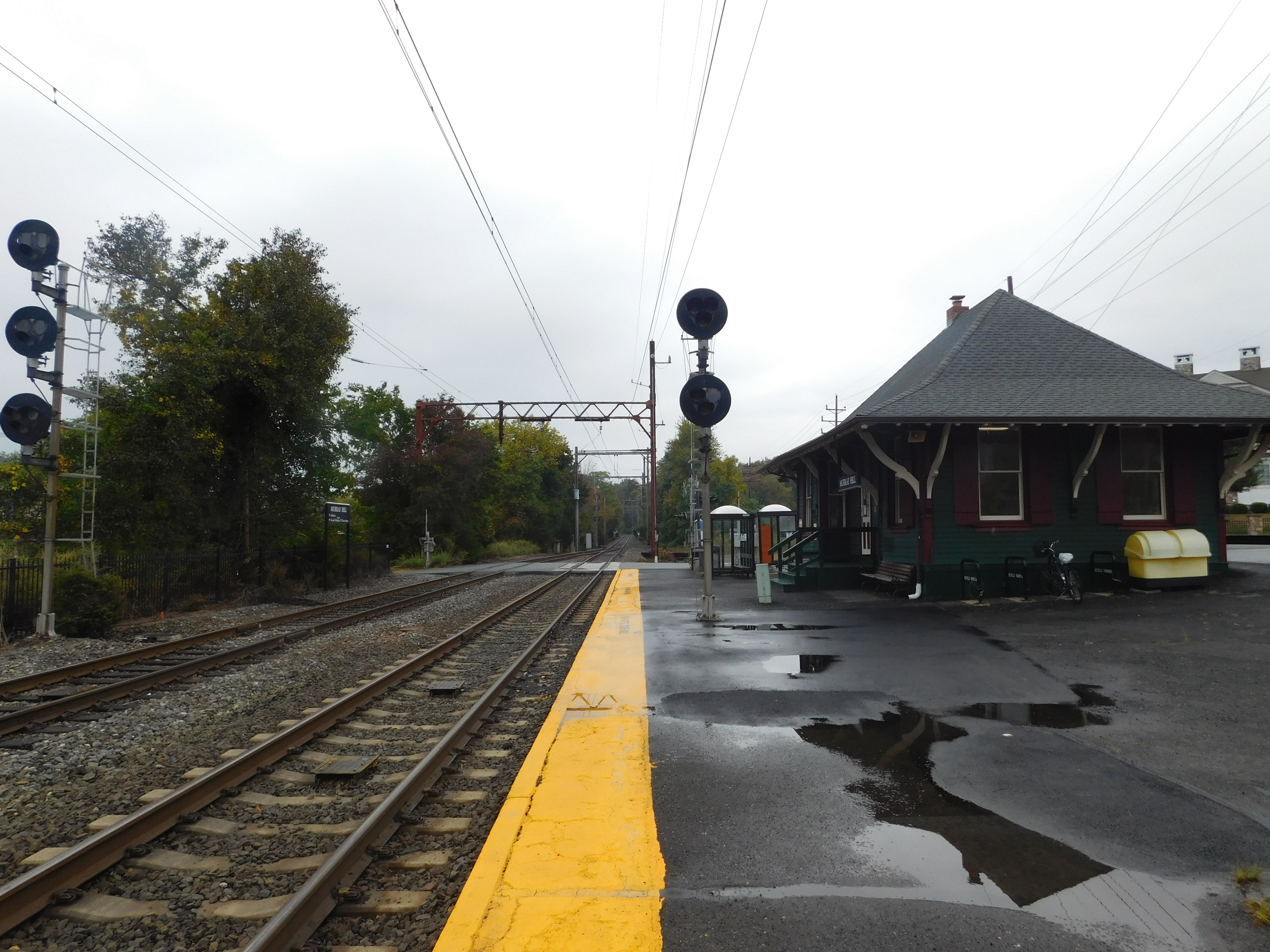
- Murray Hill station as seen in September 2020.

General information
- Location: Foley Plaza, between Floral Avenue and Southgate Road, Murray Hill, New Jersey
- Coordinates: 40°41′41″N 74°24′13″W
- Platforms: 1 side platform
- Tracks: 2
- Connections: NJT Bus: 986

Construction
- Parking: Yes
- Architectural style: Stick/Eastlake

Other information
- Station code: 703 (Delaware, Lackawanna and Western)
- Fare zone: 10

History
- Opened: January 29, 1872
- Rebuilt: 1889
- Electrified: January 6, 1931

Passengers
- 2025: 283 (average weekday)
- Rank: 87 of 153

Services
Preceding station	NJ Transit	Following station
Berkeley Heights toward Gladstone	Gladstone Branch	New Providence toward New York or Hoboken
Former services
Preceding station	Delaware, Lackawanna and Western Railroad	Following station
Berkeley Heights toward Gladstone	Gladstone Branch	New Providence toward Hoboken
- Murray Hill Station
- U.S. National Register of Historic Places
- Area: 0.5 acres (0.20 ha)
- MPS: Operating Passenger Railroad Stations TR
- NRHP reference No.: 84002826
- Added to NRHP: June 22, 1984
Location

Murray Hill is a New Jersey Transit station along the Gladstone Branch of the Morris and Essex Lines in the Murray Hill section of New Providence, in Union County, New Jersey, United States. It is located on Foley Place, between Floral Avenue and Southgate Road.

== History ==
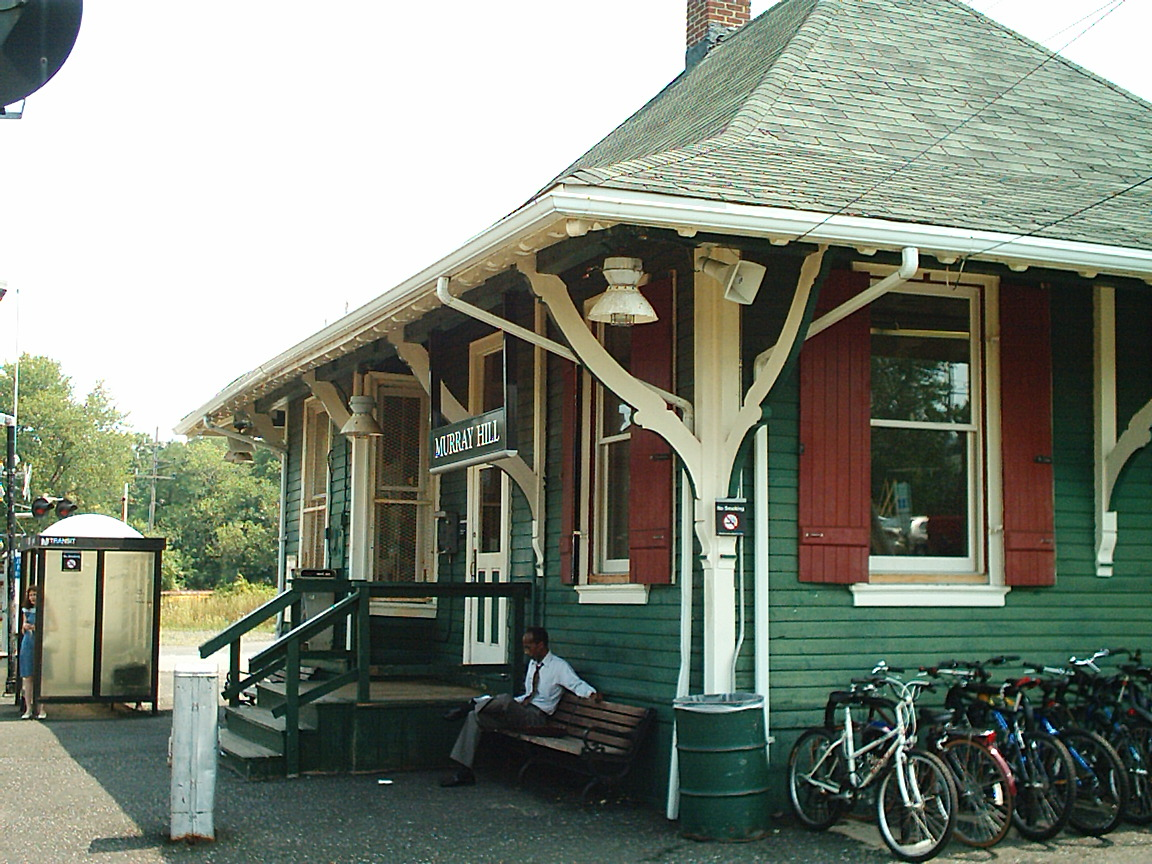
View of the station house.

The Queen Anne-style station house was built in 1890 by the Delaware, Lackawanna, and Western Railroad. The identifying stylistic features of the station are the hipped roof with broadly-flared eaves which are supported by dramatic, oversized, decorative wooden brackets, the patterning of the horizontal exterior wood siding and vertical corner boards and multi-paned double-hung sash windows. The building lacks the lavish embellishment typical of Queen Anne buildings, however, and possesses a simplicity attributable to the Stick Style, an architectural trend that immediately pre-dated the rise in popularity of the Queen Anne fashion in the late nineteenth century. The building has been listed in the New Jersey Register of Historic Places and National Register of Historic Places since 1984 and is part of the Operating Passenger Railroad Stations Thematic Resource.

In 1982, a group of local volunteers stripped the many layers of paint off down to the wood and properly added coats of primer and the classic green color the station maintained for years. This effort was spearheaded by Arthur Braunschweiger, whose family owned a jewelry store in New Providence. On March 23, 2013, the floor boards of the waiting room were completely replaced.

== Station layout ==
The station has one low-level side platform that is long enough for 5 cars. Murray Hill station features one of four remaining bypass tracks on the Gladstone branch to allow for opposing-direction trains to pass each other (most commonly observed hourly during weekend schedule operation). To allow for passengers to get on or off trains on the bypass track, there is a small wood platform near the middle of the main platform which crosses over the main track and is wide enough for one vestibule of the train.

In addition to the building with ticket office and waiting room, this station stop has a bench shelter next to the main track. Permitted parking is available, along with bicycle racks along the station house wall.

== See also ==
- List of New Jersey Transit stations
- National Register of Historic Places listings in Union County, New Jersey
