= New Providence station =

NJ Transit rail station

New Providence
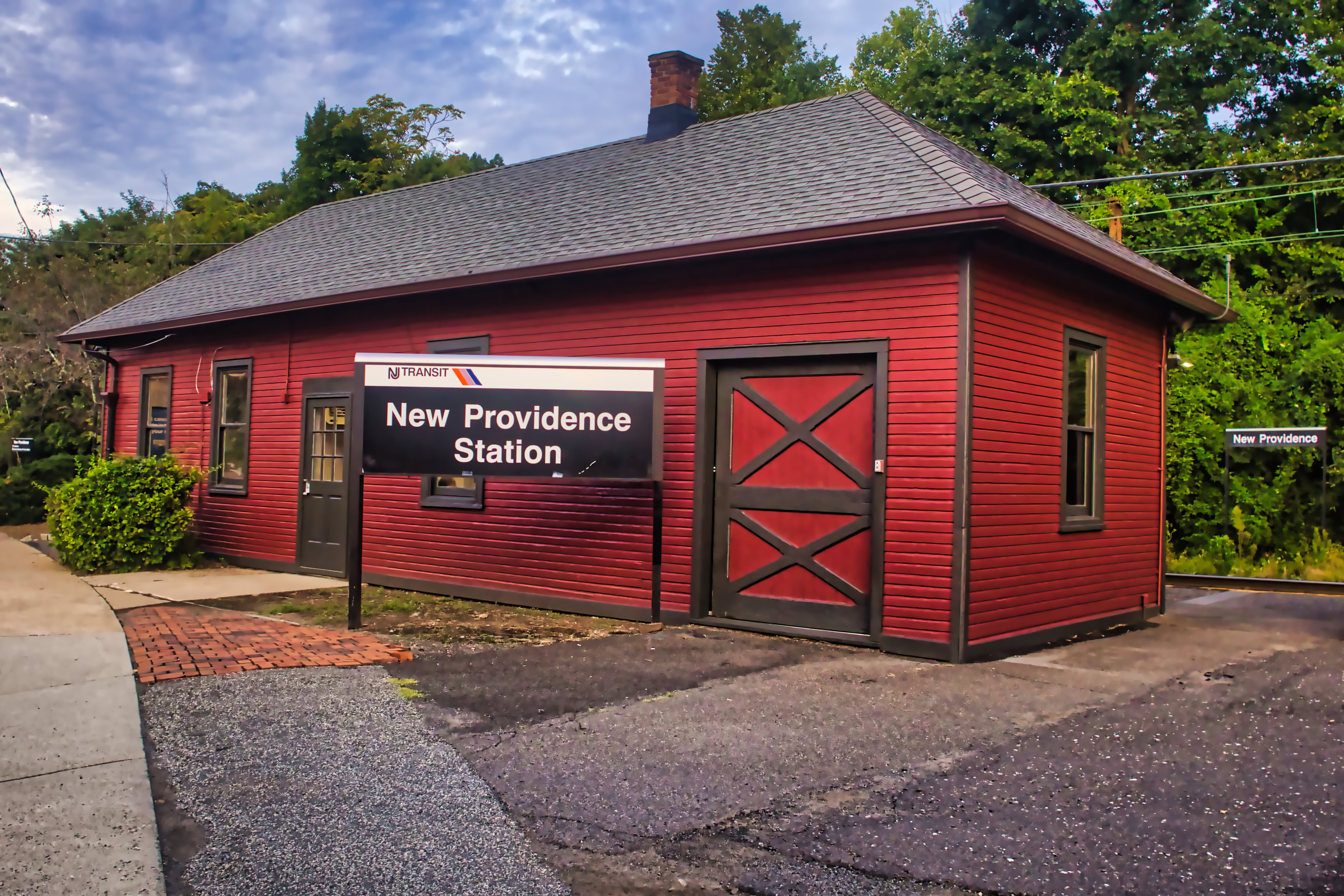
- The New Providence station after restoration in Summer 2024.

General information
- Location: 803 Old Springfield Avenue; New Providence, New Jersey
- Coordinates: 40°42′43.7″N 74°23′11.2″W
- Owner: New Jersey Transit
- Line: Gladstone Branch
- Platforms: 1 side platform
- Tracks: 1
- Connections: NJT Bus: 986; Lakeland: 78

Other information
- Station code: 702 (Delaware, Lackawanna and Western)
- Fare zone: 9

History
- Opened: January 29, 1872
- Rebuilt: 1899
- Electrified: January 6, 1931
- Former names: West Summit (1872–1927)

Passengers
- 2025: 248 (average weekday)
- Rank: 92 of 153

Services
Preceding station	NJ Transit	Following station
Murray Hill toward Gladstone	Gladstone Branch	Summit toward New York or Hoboken
Former services
Preceding station	Delaware, Lackawanna and Western Railroad	Following station
Murray Hill toward Gladstone	Gladstone Branch	Summit toward Hoboken
Location

New Providence is a New Jersey Transit station in New Providence, New Jersey along the Gladstone Branch of the Morris and Essex Lines. The original 1899 station, built by the Delaware, Lackawanna and Western Railroad still stands. New Providence station is located across from the intersection of Old Springfield Avenue and Division Avenue. Springfield Avenue was rerouted north of the station in 1931. The former segment of Springfield Avenue on the opposite side of the tracks has been turned into an additional parking lot.

The station was originally named West Summit until March 1927, as the borough of New Providence felt there was confusion for not being on railroad timetables. The station was renamed over the opposition of Summit residents.

== Station layout ==
The station has one low-level side platform.
