= Short Hills station =

NJ Transit rail station

Coordinates: 40°43′30.7″N 74°19′25.6″W

Short Hills
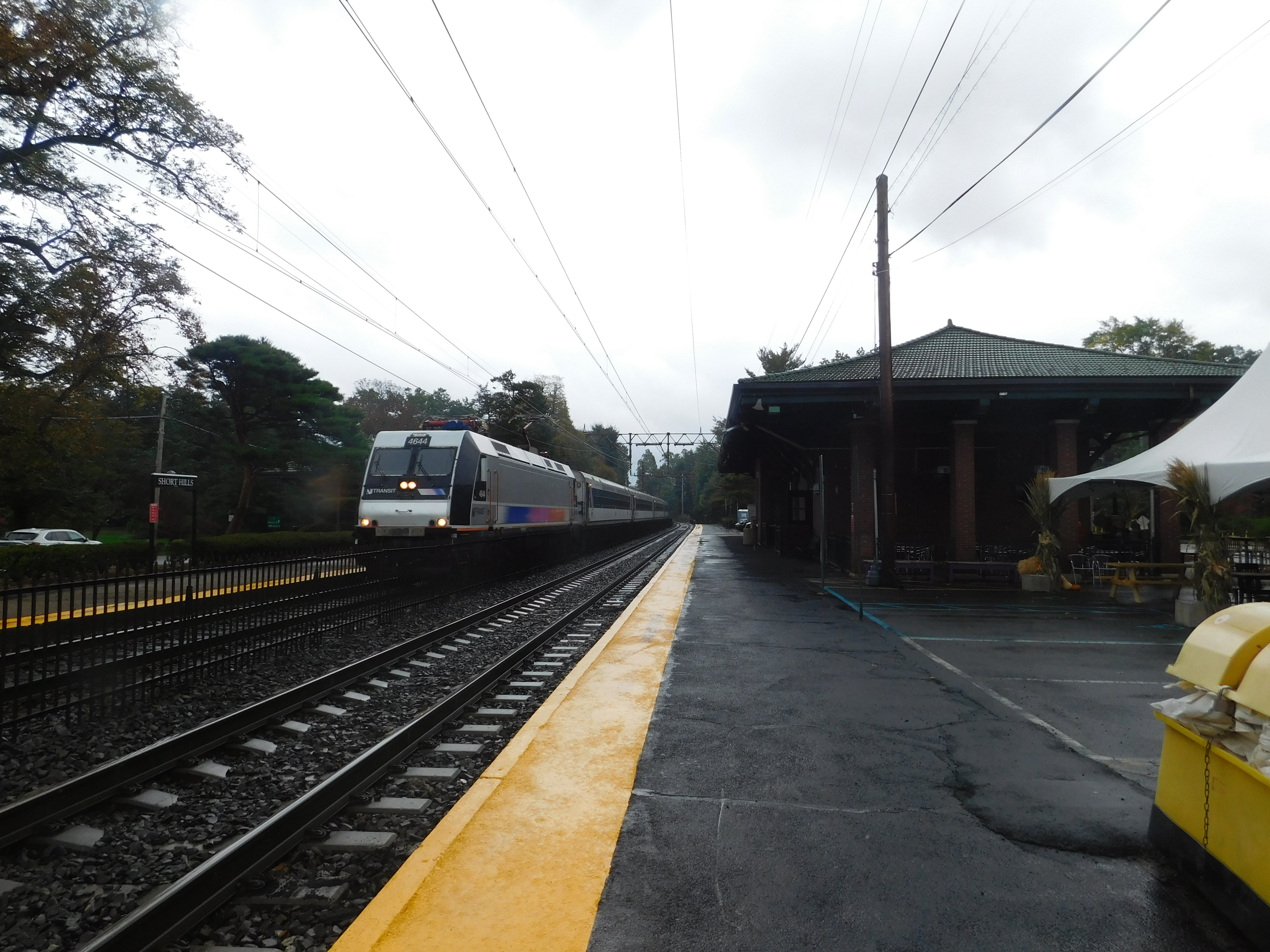
- A Morristown Line train arrives at Short Hills station in September 2020.

General information
- Location: 225 Chatham Road; Short Hills, New Jersey 07078
- Platforms: 2 side platforms
- Tracks: 2

Other information
- Fare zone: 7

History
- Opened: July 1879
- Rebuilt: 1906–1907
- Electrified: December 18, 1930

Passengers
- 2025: 1096 (average weekday)
- Rank: 30 of 153

Services
Preceding station	NJ Transit	Following station
Summit toward Gladstone	Gladstone Branch weekdays	Millburn toward New York or Hoboken
Summit toward Hackettstown	Morristown Line	Millburn toward New York or Hoboken
Former services
Preceding station	Delaware, Lackawanna and Western Railroad	Following station
Summit toward Buffalo	Main Line	Millburn toward Hoboken
Location

Short Hills is a New Jersey Transit train station in Short Hills, New Jersey along the Morris & Essex Lines.

== History ==
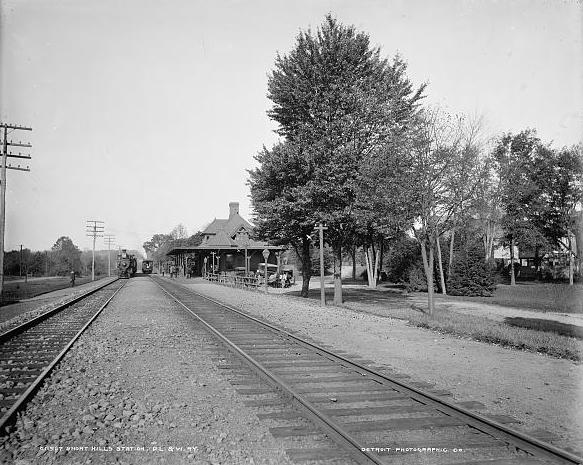
Short Hills station of the Delaware, Lackawanna and Western Railroad, c. 1895

The presence of a railroad station at the present site dates from 1879, when Stewart Hartshorn, the developer of what became the Short Hills neighborhood of Millburn, built a station along the Morris and Essex Railroad line. He built the station at his own expense at a cost of US $2,520.00, took full responsibility for its maintenance (which included paying the salary of the station master), and persuaded the operators of the M&E (actually the Delaware, Lackawanna and Western Railroad) to serve his station with two train stops a day. (The United States Post Office operated a station of its own on the premises of Stewart Hartshorn's original station. The USPS's presence in Short Hills dates from that year.)

The present facility dates from 1907 after Stewart Hartshorn's original station was demolished. The DL&W completed its Lackawanna Terminal (now the Hoboken Terminal) in that same year.

This station has remained in operation for as long as any entity has run trains along the line. The Erie-Lackawanna Railroad served it, as did Conrail before the formation of New Jersey Transit.

In 2002, local residents planted a memorial tree on the station grounds to honor those of their neighbors who went to work on September 11, 2001, most of them using this very station, and never came back.

Millburn Township has renovated the station and upgraded the restrooms to make them compliant with the federal Americans with Disabilities Act. They have also repaired the rain gutters and leaders (downspouts). All the wooden doors, windows, and benches have undergone refinishing.

== Station layout and services ==
The station is located between Hobart Avenue, Chatham Road, and Station Plaza. The roads Crescent Place and Short Hills Avenue terminate at or near the station. A trestle carries trains over Short Hills Avenue. The relatively narrow opening of the trestle makes this intersection one of the most dangerous in all of Short Hills.

The 1907 station had two buildings, one on each side of the double tracks. Today, however, only the building on the eastbound side (toward Hoboken and New York Penn Station) is in active use by New Jersey Transit. The westbound building houses the Millburn–Short Hills Historical Society. The eastbound building houses a waiting area, community bulletin board, a restroom, a small news stand, a restaurant, and a ticket office (normally open weekdays between 4:45 a.m. and 12:45 p.m.).

No residence, business, or office, except the two buildings of the station proper, stands on the two strips of land separating the railroad right-of-way from Hobart Avenue on the westbound side and Chatham Road on the eastbound. This is an intentional policy that carries forward from Stewart Hartshorn's original directive that no development ever take place on those strips of land.

Permit parking is available on the eastbound side of the station and across nearby Chatham Avenue, the same as the residential parking permits that allow on-street parking in front of homes. Both platforms are low-level side platforms that are not handicap-accessible. New Jersey Transit does not operate any local bus route connecting to this station, though Springfield Township runs a commuter jitney between the Springfield Community Pool and the train station.

== Gallery ==
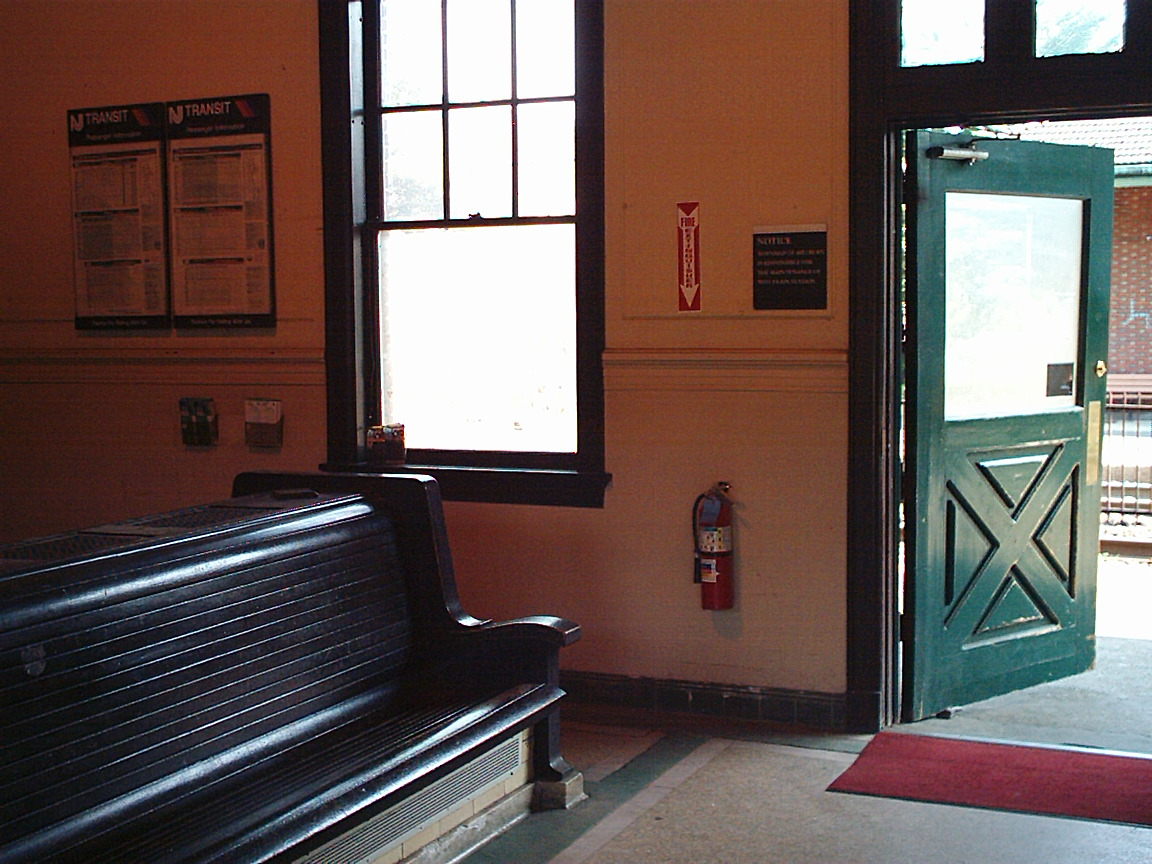
Waiting room

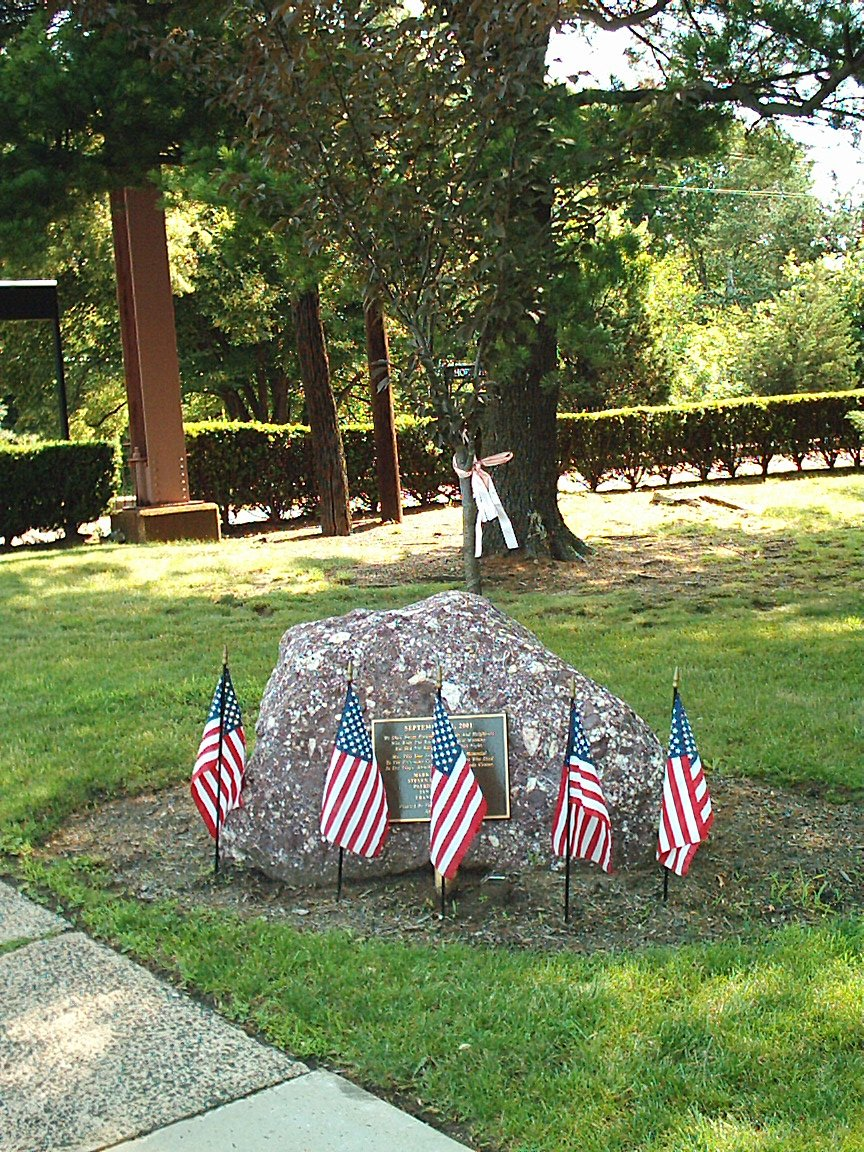
Short Hills Memorial Tree

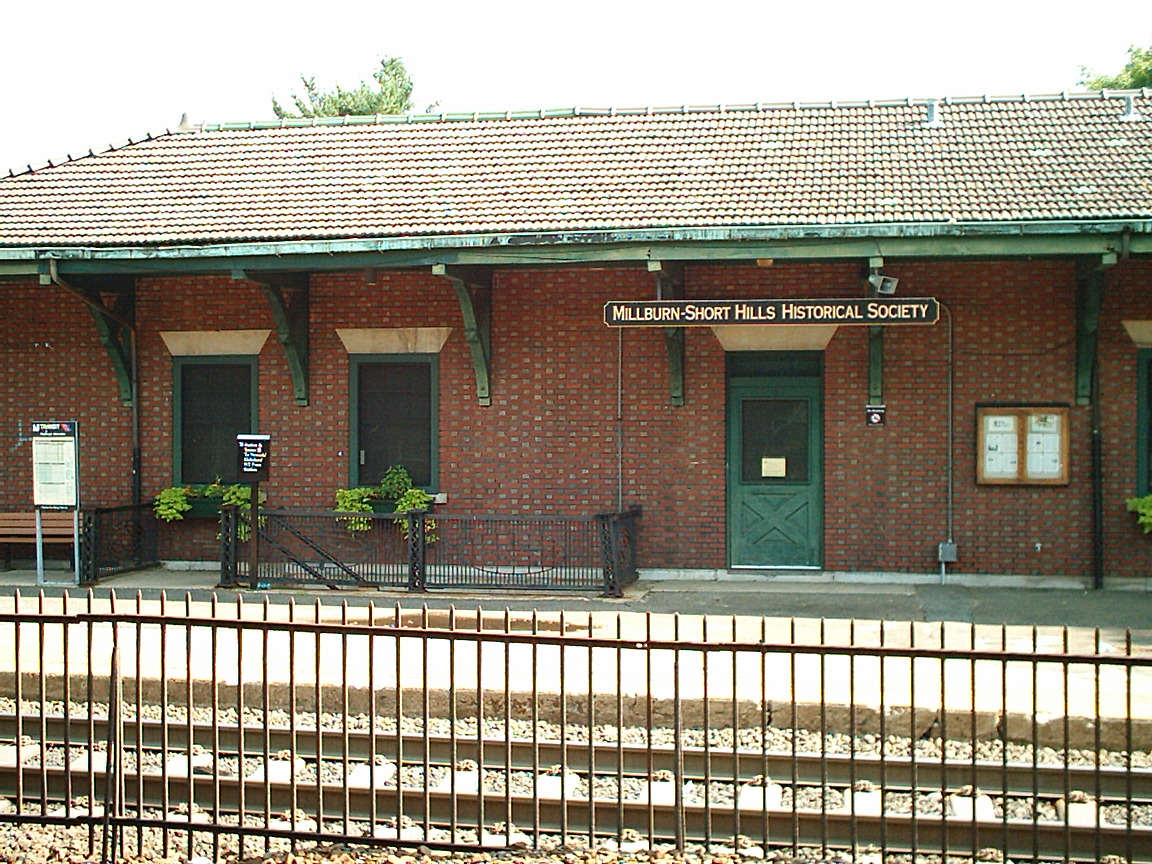
Historical Society Museum

== Bibliography ==
- Stern, Robert A.M.; Fishman, David; Tilove, Jacob (2013). Paradise Planned: The Garden Suburb and the Modern City. New York, New York: The Monacelli Press. ISBN 9781580933261.
