= South Orange station =

NJ Transit rail station

South Orange
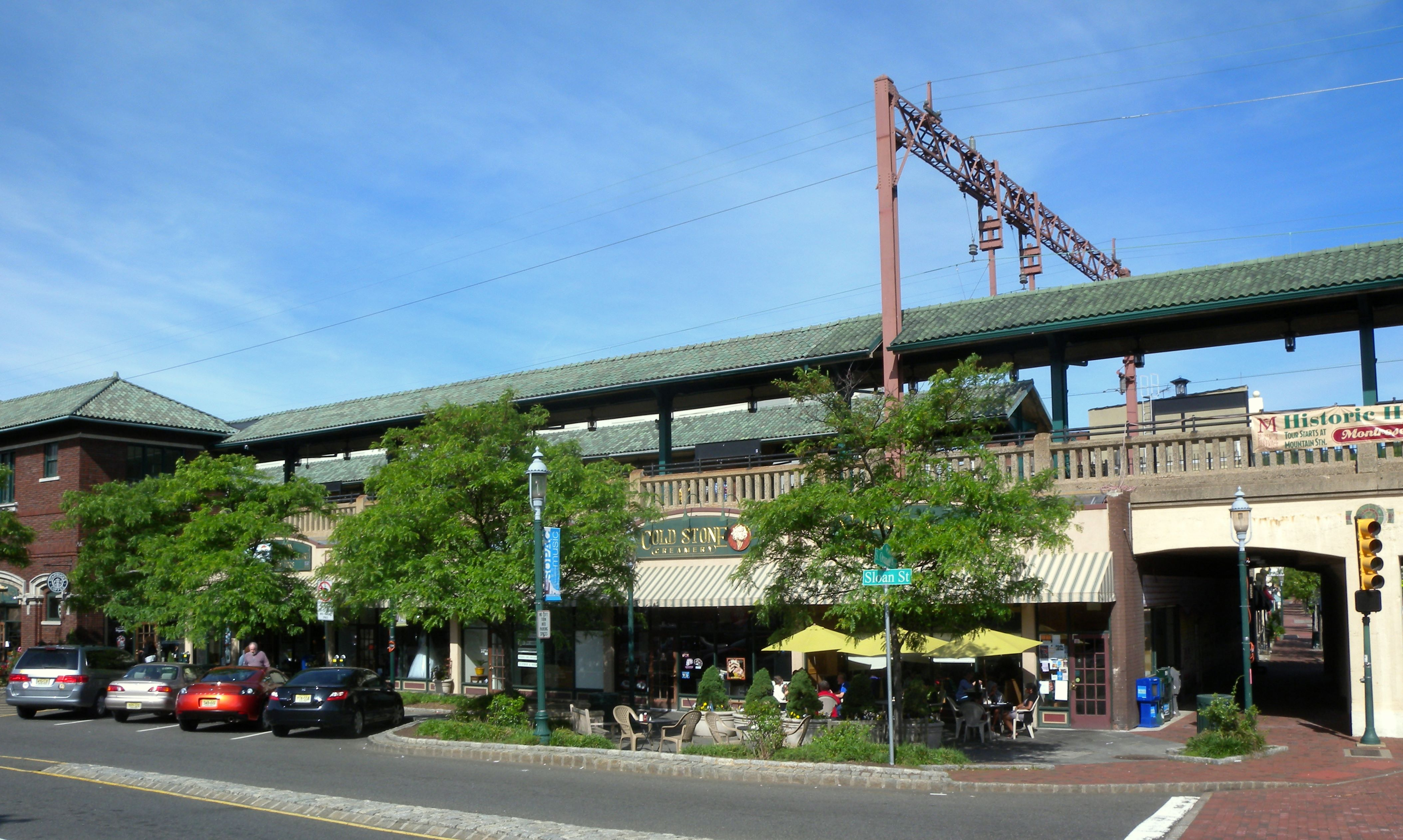
- South Orange station at the southwest corner of South Orange Avenue and Sloan Street.

General information
- Location: 17 Sloan Street, South Orange, New Jersey
- Owner: New Jersey Transit
- Platforms: 1 side platform and 1 island platform
- Tracks: 3
- Connections: NJT Bus: 31, 92, and 107

Construction
- Accessible: Yes (mini-platform)

Other information
- Fare zone: 5

History
- Opened: September 17, 1837 (preliminary trip); September 28, 1837 (regular service)
- Rebuilt: February 1, 1916
- Electrified: September 22, 1930

Passengers
- 2025: 2,682 (average weekday)
- Rank: 11 of 153

Services
Preceding station	NJ Transit	Following station
Maplewood toward Gladstone	Gladstone Branch weekdays	Mountain Station toward New York or Hoboken
Maplewood toward Hackettstown	Morristown Line	Mountain Station toward New York or Hoboken
Former services
Preceding station	Delaware, Lackawanna and Western Railroad	Following station
Maplewood toward Buffalo	Main Line	Mountain Station toward Hoboken
- South Orange Station
- U.S. National Register of Historic Places
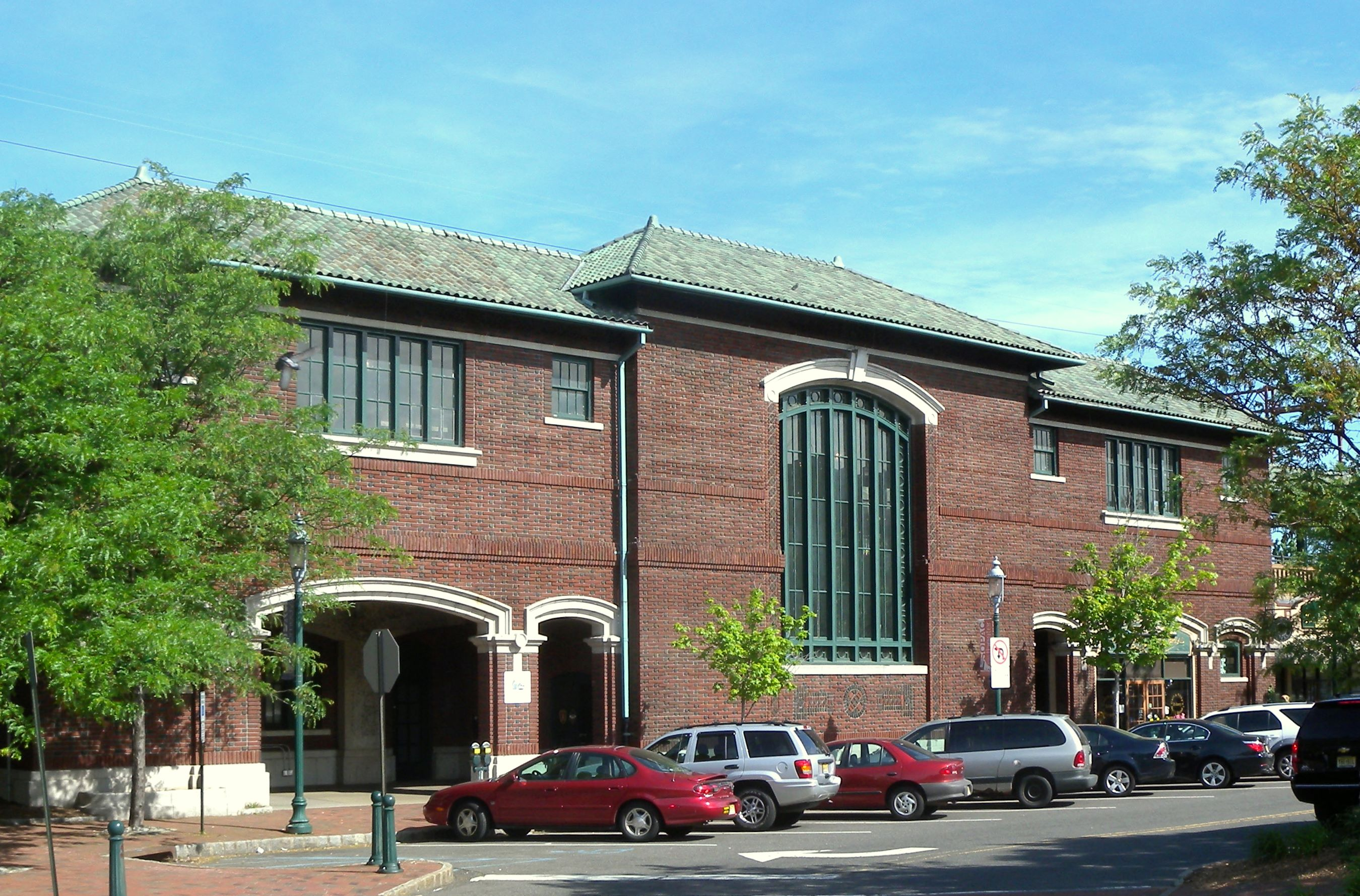
- The station house as seen from Sloan Street
- Location: 17 Sloan Street, South Orange, New Jersey
- Coordinates: 40°44′45″N 74°15′39″W
- Area: 1.5 acres (0.61 ha)
- Built: 1916
- Architect: Frank J. Nies
- Architectural style: Renaissance
- MPS: Operating Passenger Railroad Stations TR
- NRHP reference No.: 84002669
- Added to NRHP: June 22, 1984
Location

South Orange is a New Jersey Transit station in South Orange, New Jersey along the Morris and Essex (formerly Erie Lackawanna) rail line. It is located in the business district of South Orange, near its town hall. It is one of two train stations in the township of South Orange, Mountain Station being the other near the township border. South Orange station was built by the Lackawanna Railroad in 1916.

== History ==
The railroad was raised to eliminate grade crossings in South Orange in the 1910s. A new station was constructed of dark brick with a green roof.

Station owner New Jersey Transit decided to perform work at South Orange station to improve accessibility and to repair ninety-year-old viaducts at the station. At a cost of $22.9 million, repair work at South Orange, along with other nearby stations commenced in 2004. South Orange received a mini-high level platform as a result of the repairs, and the tracks surrounding the station were upgraded to have concrete ties and the stairways leading towards the platforms were replaced.

== Station layout and service ==
As with nearly all stations on the Morris & Essex Lines east of Summit, there are three tracks at South Orange station numbered according to the scheme that was established by the Lackawanna Railroad. Track 1, the express track, is the middle of the three tracks and is served by trains in the peak rush hour direction. Track 2, the southernmost track, serves eastbound trains heading towards Hoboken and New York. Track 3 is the northernmost track and handles westbound trains to Dover, Gladstone, and Hackettstown.

The western end of the platform for tracks 1 and 3 and the eastern end of the platform for track 2 contain high-level sections of platform. Installed in 2004, these allow those with handicaps to board and bring the station in compliance with ADA regulations. There are a number of retail stores at street level, below the station building. As of 2022, these stores are Cait & Abby's Bakery, Starbucks, Super Cuts, On the Track Cleaners, Cold Stone Creamery, and Village Diner.

Bus services are available on the 92 and 107 lines, with both the 92 and 107 terminating at South Orange, while the 92 heads to Branch Brook Park Light Rail Station, and the 107 express line (Irvington-New York) heads to Port Authority Bus Terminal.

== See also ==
- Operating Passenger Railroad Stations Thematic Resource (New Jersey)
- List of New Jersey Transit stations
