= Gladstone Branch =

Commuter rail line in New Jersey

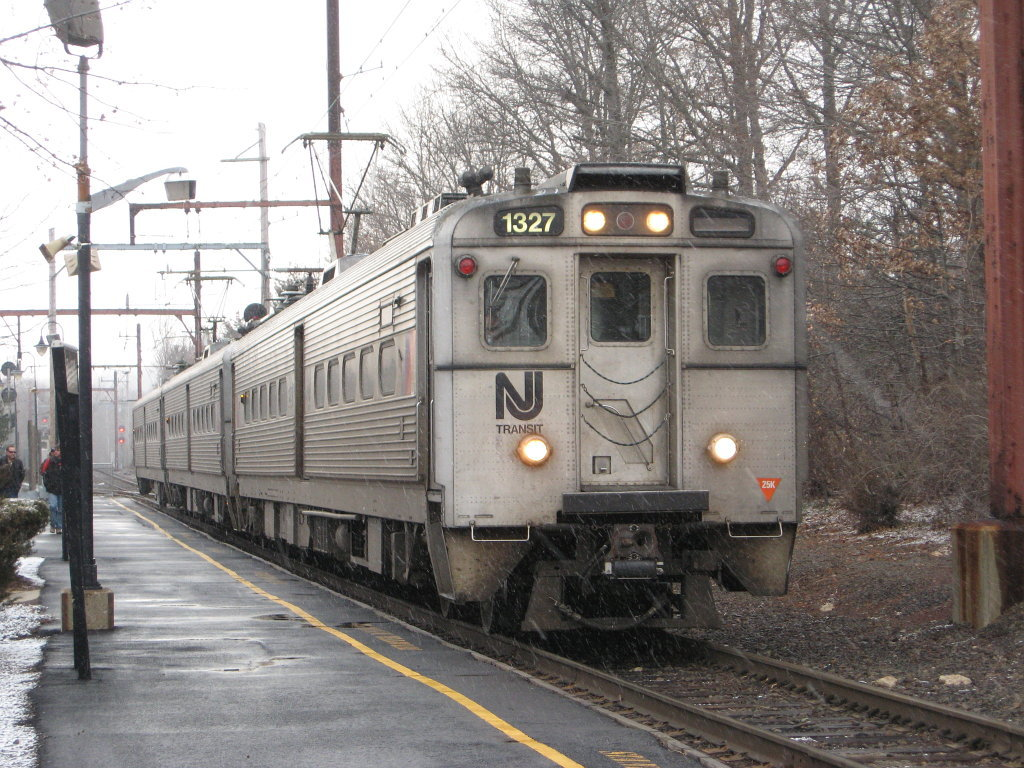
- Gladstone Branch train at Far Hills en route to Summit.

Overview
- Owner: New Jersey Transit (except from Kearny Connection to New York Penn); Amtrak (Kearny to Penn)
- Locale: North Jersey
- Termini: Hoboken NY Penn Station (two rush hour trips); Gladstone
- Stations: 24

Service
- Type: Commuter rail
- System: New Jersey Transit Rail Operations
- Operator(s): New Jersey Transit
- Rolling stock: ALP-46 and ALP-45DP locomotives, MultiLevel coaches, Comet coaches, Arrow III multiple units
- Daily ridership: 37,850 (Q1, FY 2025) (Note: Includes ridership from Morristown Line)

Technical
- Line length: 42.3 mi (68.1 km)
- Track gauge: 4 ft 8 1/2 in (1,435 mm) standard gauge
- Electrification: Overhead line, 25 kV 60 Hz AC

The Gladstone Branch (also known as the Gladstone Line) is a commuter rail line operated by NJ Transit in the U.S. state of New Jersey, one of two branches of the Morris & Essex Lines. Gladstone Line trains operate between Gladstone station and either Hoboken Terminal or New York Penn Station.

The Gladstone Branch itself runs from Gladstone to a junction with the Morris & Essex at Summit. It is single-tracked with passing sidings at Murray Hill, Stirling, Bernardsville and west of Far Hills.

At Summit, the Gladstone Branch joins with the Morristown Line. East of Newark Broad Street station, Gladstone Line trains may either continue to Hoboken Terminal, where PATH trains or NY Waterway ferries allow connection to New York, or use the Kearny Connection to diverge to New York Penn Station; two peak-hour trains from Gladstone offer direct trips to/from New York Penn Station.

On weekdays during rush hours, the line operates in two zones: all stops from Hoboken to Summit; or express from Hoboken to Short Hills (one station east of Summit), and then local to Gladstone. All weekend and off-peak service is local across the entire line.

The line primarily operates in the eastbound direction weekday peak hours, except for a limited number of reverse peak trains. On weekends the line operates Gladstone-Summit service hourly along the branch. Until August 13, 2006 all trains continued to Hoboken. On that date, service between Hoboken and Summit was cut back to once every two hours on weekends. On May 11, 2008, off-peak weekday Hoboken-Dover trains (600 Series) were cut. In addition, weekend Gladstone trains were cut back to Summit, and a shuttle train operated every two hours between Newark Broad Street and Hoboken Terminal. (This shuttle train was later extended to provide bihourly service to Bay Street on the Montclair–Boonton Line). Passengers for Penn Station connect at Summit to/from a Dover/Penn Station train.

The line is colored pale green on system maps and its symbol is a horse, a reference to the Grand National Hurdle Stakes steeplechase race held in the area.

== History ==
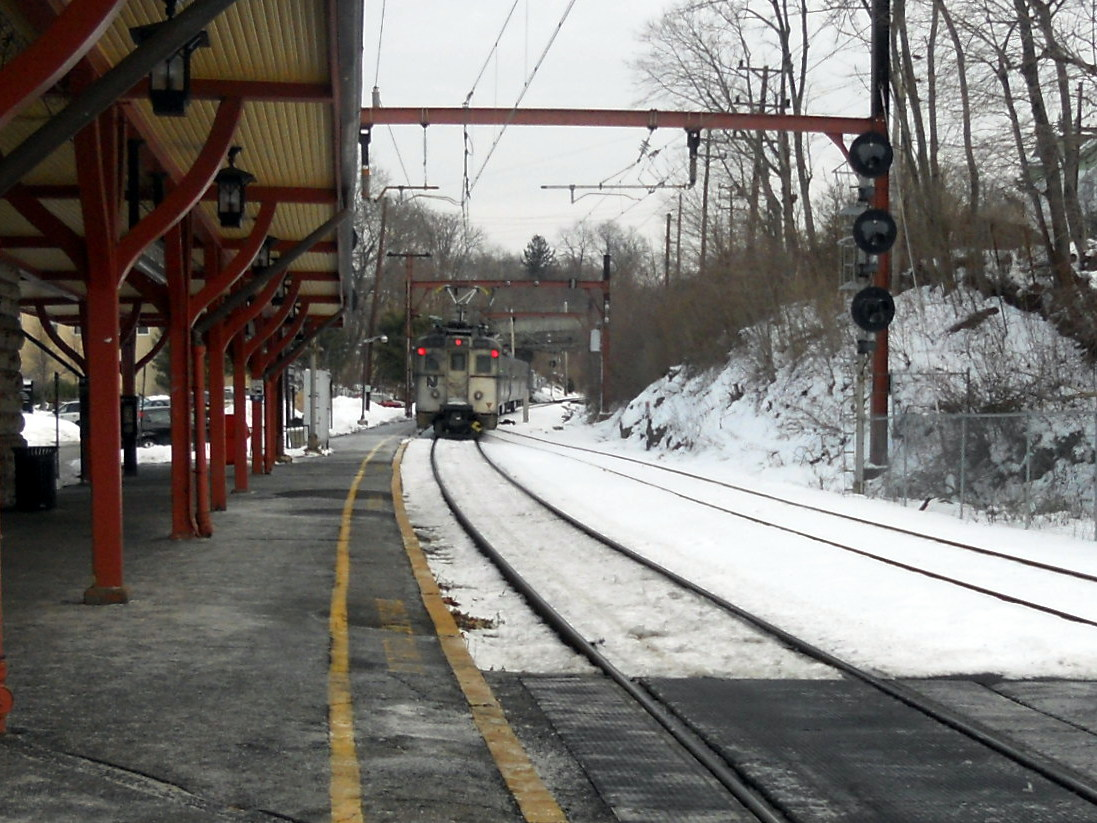
Bernardsville station with a train departing

The only part of the New Jersey West Line Railroad that was completed was from Summit west to Bernardsville. The New Jersey West Line Railroad was dissolved in 1878 and the assets were sold off. The Summit to Bernardsville line was then purchased by the Passaic and Delaware Railroad. The Delaware Lackawanna and Western Railroad (DL&W) leased the line on November 1, 1882 as a branch of the Morris and Essex. The Passaic and Delaware Extension Railroad was chartered in 1890 and opened later that year, extending the line to its current terminus in Gladstone, New Jersey. The DL&W continued to operate this line throughout its lifespan as the Passaic and Delaware Branch, later becoming labelled the Gladstone Branch. In 1960, the DL&W merged with the Erie Railroad to form the Erie Lackawanna Railway, who took over the branch line. In 1983, New Jersey Transit assumed control of the line, and continues to operate it to this day.

The branch received severe damage from Hurricane Sandy on October 29–30, 2012, especially to the catenary and signal system, causing a suspension of service for one month. High winds brought down five tall catenary poles (whose replacements had to be custom-made), approximately five miles of catenary, and 49 trees across the tracks. Gladstone service resumed on Monday, December 3 with electric Midtown Direct trains to Penn Station and diesel-powered trains to Hoboken; full electric operation was impractical until substation damage near Hoboken was repaired in early 2013.

== Description ==
Gladstone Line trains begin at Hoboken Terminal, with the exception of two weekday trains which run in and out of New York Penn Station. Gladstone Line trains run over the Morris & Essex from Hoboken or New York to Summit. At Summit, schedules are timed for most Morristown trains and Gladstone trains, permitting easy transfers across the platform or one right after the other.

The Gladstone Branch parallels the Amtrak Northeast Corridor and PATH lines and Interstate 280 (I-280) for a short distance here. The Waterfront Connection is just prior to the overpass at Meadows interlocking. It allows selected North Jersey Coast Line and Raritan Valley Line trains to access Hoboken from the Northeast Corridor Line.

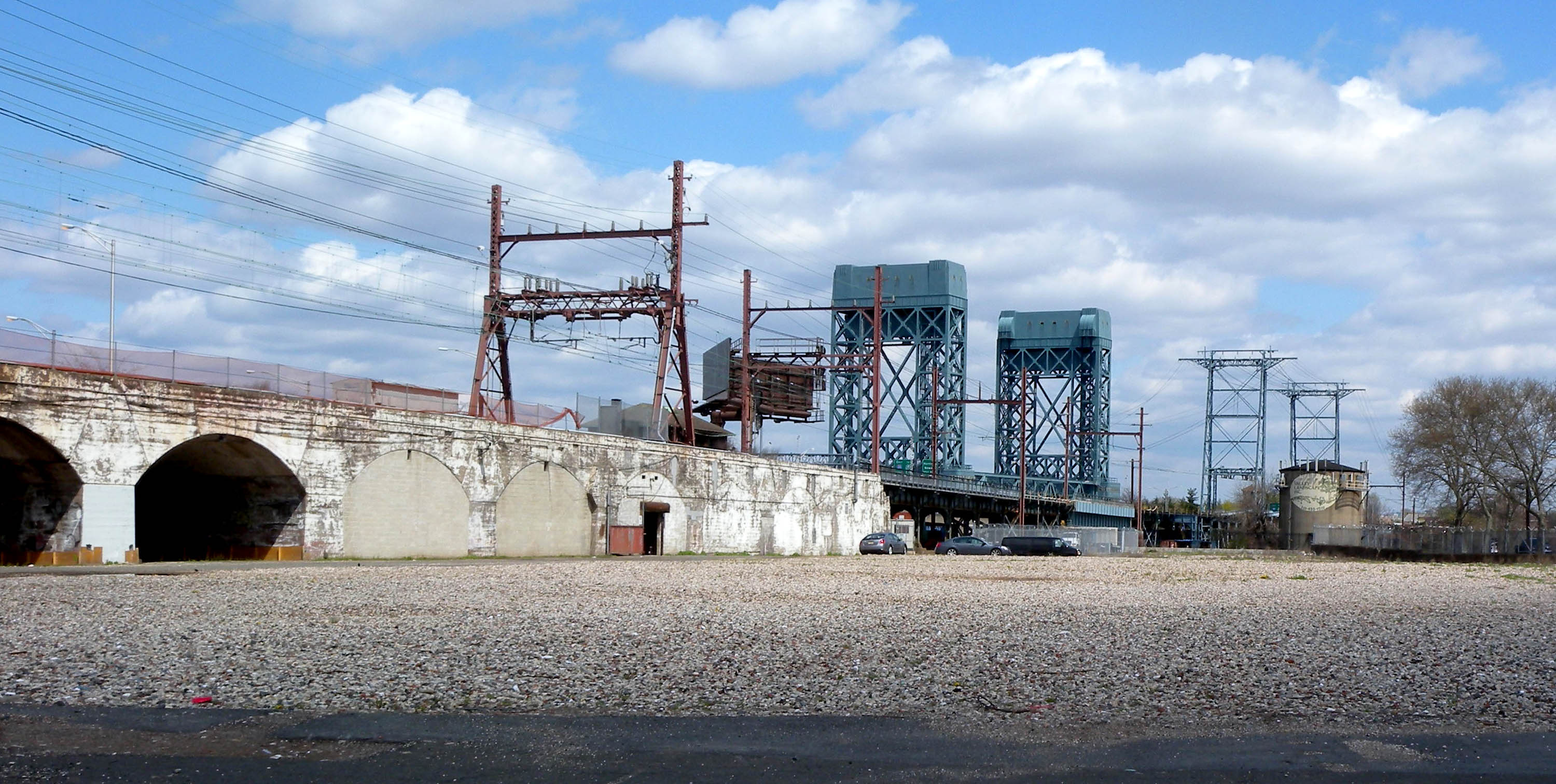
Newark Drawbridge over the Passaic River bridge. The swing bridge is to the right of the vehicular William A. Stickel Memorial Bridge (I-280) lift bridge in background

Passing Passaic River by NJT train, east of Broad Street, in Newark, NJ

The line begins its journey by following I-280 and crosses a two-track swing bridge over the Passaic River. It enters Newark Broad Street station, which features two high platforms serving all three tracks. Within the city limits of Newark, the line runs in a trench, passing beneath numerous streets, I-280, and the Newark City Subway. At the site of the former Roseville Avenue station, now known as the Roseville interlocking, the Montclair–Boonton Line diverges to the north. The section of the track extending westward from the Passaic River to just east of Millburn station is composed of triple tracks, while the remainder of the route to Lake Hopatcong station is a double-track railway.

After passing the abandoned station at Grove Street, now the location of Green interlocking, the line crosses the Garden State Parkway and reaches East Orange, which is situated on a viaduct. Subsequent elevated stations include Brick Church and Orange. The line then curves southward over Interstate 280, passing past Highland Avenue and Mountain Station. The next station is South Orange, an elevated structure with two platforms and three tracks, near Seton Hall University. Maplewood follows, with a side platform and a center platform serving all westbound and some eastbound trains. Beyond Maplewood, the line narrows to two tracks at Millburn interlocking. Millburn and Short Hills stations each have two side platforms serving two tracks.

Just west of Summit, the Morristown Line separates. The Gladstone Branch curves left at the Summit substation before entering New Providence. After New Providence, the line passes its first grade crossing at a 4-way intersection of Central Avenue and Livingston Avenue. This crossing is one of the few 4-way crossings along NJ Transit rail lines. The line then continues, crossing Foley Place and entering Murray Hill station. At Murray Hill, the track splits in two to allow eastbound trains and westbound to pass each other, since most of the line is single tracked. There is a wooden plank at Murray Hill to allow passengers on westbound trains to get off before the eastbound train arrives on the track closest to the station platform. Schedules are timed for a convenient meetup at Murray Hill. After Murray Hill, the line passes three more grade crossings: at Warner Field Path, at Union Avenue, and at Snyder Avenue. There used to be a siding for the General Chemical Company plant just west of the Snyder Avenue crossing, but this was removed between 2018 and 2019.

The line crosses Plainfield Avenue and enters Berkeley Heights station, which also contains a siding for parking equipment. The line then continues and crosses the Passaic River a second time and enters Morris County.

There are three stations in Long Hill Township. The first is Gillette station. After Gillette, the line crosses Morristown Road and enters Stirling station. At Stirling, the track splits in two, again to allow eastbound and westbound trains to pass each other. The line also crosses Central Avenue at the station. Continuing westward, the line crosses Northfield Road by Millington Elementary School before curving right, crossing Division Avenue, and entering Millington station. At Millington, there used to be another gateless crossing on the other side of the platform, where the line will cross River Road, a small connection road between Commerce Street and Long Hill Road, but this crossing was closed off sometime around 2014-2015.

The line continues westward, crossing the Passaic River a third time before entering Somerset County and Bernards Township and crossing Pond Hill Road. After this crossing, the Millington quarry can be seen on the left (going westbound). Here, there is a short passing siding; although trains going opposite directions can also pass each other here, this area is not usually used for that. Lyons station is the next stop. The line enters the station after crossing a bridge over South Finley Avenue. After another crossing at Lake Road near Ridge High School and another bridge over West Oak Street, the line enters Basking Ridge station at the crossing at Ridge Street. Until recently, the original semaphore signal from the DL&W years used to sit atop the Basking Ridge station over the platform, one of the last vestiges of the previous operator of the line.

Afterwards, the line crosses over Interstate 287 before curving left and entering Bernardsville station after crossing under Mount Airy Road. At Bernardsville, the track splits in two, again to allow trains to pass each other if necessary, and the line crosses Depot Place. Continuing westward, the line parallels U.S. Route 202 and crosses Old Quarry Road, Meeker Road, and Whitenack Road. At Whitenack Road is the site of the former Mine Brook station, a flag stop in the line's DL&W years. Mine Brook is the only station that was never rebuilt or even acquired by New Jersey Transit. Today, all that is left of the station is gravel where the platform used to be and a small gravel road where the parking used to be. The line then crosses Route 202 and enters Far Hills station, which has a station depot and a freight house to the west. Just west of the station near the freight house, the track splits in two again to allow eastbound and westbound trains to pass each other.

After Far Hills, the line snakes through the Far Hills area before entering the borough of Peapack and Gladstone while crossing over the North Branch Raritan River and under Peapack Road. Peapack station is next at the crossing at Holland Avenue. The line then crosses a walkway in Liberty Park before entering Gladstone yard. At Gladstone yard, the track splits into 5 to allow for parking of trains. One of the tracks switches back to condense into one or can act as a siding, while the other 4 tracks condense back into one. West of the yard, the tracks enter Gladstone station and its freight house. One track leads to the freight house, while two lead to the station.

The timetables are arranged so that most of the trains meet at Far Hills and Murray Hill. While Bernardsville and Stirling each have two tracks at the station, the second track at those two stations is less commonly used unless a train is running late.

== Freight service ==
At the time of NJT acquisition, freight service was operated by Conrail. Upon the breakup of that company, the Norfolk Southern Railway inherited the business. Customers on the line dwindled, and the last customer, the Reheis Chemical Company, was bought out by the General Chemical Company and planned to close down in 2008. The apparent last freight train made its run on November 7, 2008; however, seven months later the facility began receiving shipments again, on June 19, 2009. Although this industry is east of the Berkeley Heights station, the freight trains actually operate as far west as Stirling, where the engine uses the siding to run around the train to reverse direction. In 2019, the Dover and Delaware River Railroad took over freight service along the line.

== Electrification ==
Like the Morristown Line, the Gladstone Branch is electrified using overhead catenary at 25 kV 60 Hz. Traction power comes from the NJT substation at Summit, which also powers much of the Morristown Line. The Summit substation is located north of New Providence on the Morristown Line, between the Summit and Chatham stations, and receives power from the nearby Summit Utility substation. In addition to the NJT Summit traction substation, three other switching facilities are located along the line.

== Stations ==
| State | Zone | Location | Station | Miles (km) From NYP | Date opened | Date Closed | Connections/notes |
| NY | 1 | Manhattan | New York Penn | 0.0 (0.0) | 1910 | | Amtrak (long distance): Cardinal, Crescent, Lake Shore Limited, Palmetto, Silver Meteor; Amtrak (intercity): Acela, Adirondack, Carolinian, Empire Service, Ethan Allen Express, Keystone Service, Maple Leaf, Northeast Regional, Pennsylvanian, Vermonter; Long Island Rail Road: Babylon, Belmont Park, City Terminal Zone, Far Rockaway, Hempstead, Long Beach, Montauk, Oyster Bay, Port Jefferson, Port Washington, Ronkonkoma, West Hempstead branches NJ Transit Rail: Morristown, Montclair–Boonton, Northeast Corridor, Raritan Valley, North Jersey Coast lines New York City Subway: 1, 2, and 3 (at 34th Street – Penn Station (Seventh Avenue)), A, C, and E (at 34th Street – Penn Station (Eighth Avenue)); New York City Bus: M7, M20, M34 SBS, M34A, Q32; Academy Bus: SIM23, SIM24; Flixbus: Eastern Shuttle; Vamoose Bus |
| NJ | 1 | Secaucus | Secaucus Junction | 3.5 (5.6) | 2003 | | NJ Transit Rail: Bergen County, Morristown, Main, Meadowlands, Montclair–Boonton, Northeast Corridor, Pascack Valley, Raritan Valley, and North Jersey Coast lines Metro-North Railroad: Port Jervis Line; NJ Transit Bus: 2, 78, 129, 329, 353 |
| NJ | 1 | Hoboken | Hoboken Terminal | – | 1903 | | NJ Transit Rail: Bergen County, Morristown, Main, Meadowlands, Montclair–Boonton, Pascack Valley, Raritan Valley, and North Jersey Coast lines Metro-North Railroad: Port Jervis Line; Hudson-Bergen Light Rail: 8th Street-Hoboken, Hoboken-Tonnelle; PATH: HOB-WTC, HOB-33, JSQ-33 (via HOB); NJ Transit Bus: 22, 22X, 23, 68, 85, 87, 89, 126; New York Waterway |
| NJ | 2 | Harrison | Harrison | 7.13 (11.5) | | September 16, 1984 | |
| NJ | 2 | Newark | Newark Broad Street | 10.4 (16.7) | November 19, 1836 | | NJ Transit Rail: Montclair–Boonton Line and Morristown Line; Newark Light Rail: Broad Street – Newark Penn; NJ Transit Bus: 11, 13, 27, 28, go28, 29, 30, 41, 72, 76, 78, 108 |
| NJ | 4 | Newark | Roseville Avenue | 11.6 (18.7) | | September 16, 1984 | |
| NJ | 4 | East Orange | Grove Street | 12.2 (19.6) | | April 7, 1991 | |
| NJ | 4 | East Orange | East Orange | 12.6 (20.3) | November 19, 1836 | | NJ Transit Rail: Morristown Line; NJ Transit Bus: 21, 71, 73, 79, 94; Community Coach: 77 |
| NJ | 4 | East Orange | Brick Church | 13.2 (21.2) | November 19, 1836 | | NJ Transit Rail: Morristown Line; NJ Transit Bus: 21, 71, 73, 79, 94, 97; Community Coach: 77; ONE Bus: 24 |
| NJ | 4 | Orange | Orange | 14.1 (22.7) | November 19, 1836 | | NJ Transit Rail: Morristown Line; NJ Transit Bus: 21, 41, 71, 73, 92; Community Coach: 77; ONE Bus: 24, 44; West Orange Community Shuttle |
| NJ | 5 | Orange | Highland Avenue | 14.8 (23.8) | | | NJ Transit Rail: Morristown Line; NJ Transit Bus: 92; ONE Bus: 44 |
| NJ | 5 | South Orange | Mountain Station | 15.7 (25.3) | | | NJ Transit Rail: Morristown Line; NJ Transit Bus: 92 |
| NJ | 5 | South Orange | South Orange | 16.5 (26.6) | September 17, 1837 | | NJ Transit Rail: Morristown Line; NJ Transit Bus: 92, 107; ONE Bus: 31; South Orange Community Shuttle; West Orange Community Shuttle |
| NJ | 6 | Maplewood | Maplewood | 17.8 (28.6) | September 17, 1837 | | NJ Transit Rail: Morristown Line; Maplewood Community Shuttle |
| NJ | 6 | | Wyoming | | | November 10, 1907 | |
| NJ | 7 | Millburn | Millburn | 19.4 (32.2) | September 17, 1837 | | NJ Transit Rail: Morristown Line; NJ Transit Bus: 70 |
| NJ | 7 | Short Hills | Short Hills | 20.4 (32.8) | July 1879 | | NJ Transit Rail: Morristown Line; Springfield Community Shuttle |
| NJ | 9 | Summit | Summit | 22.7 (36.5) | September 17, 1837 | | NJ Transit Rail: Morristown Line; NJ Transit Bus: 70, 986; Lakeland Bus: 78 |
| NJ | 9 | New Providence | New Providence | 24.4 (39.3) | January 29, 1872 | | NJ Transit Bus: 986; Lakeland Bus: 78 |
| NJ | 10 | New Providence | Murray Hill | 26.0 (41.8) | January 29, 1872 | | NJ Transit Bus: 986 |
| NJ | 11 | Berkeley Heights | Berkeley Heights | 28.4 (45.7) | January 29, 1872 | | Lakeland Bus: 78 |
| NJ | 12 | Long Hill | Gillette | 29.7 (47.8) | January 29, 1872 | | |
| NJ | 14 | Long Hill | Stirling | 31.1 (50.1) | January 29, 1872 | | |
| NJ | 14 | Long Hill | Millington | 32.7 (52.6) | January 29, 1872 | | |
| NJ | 14 | Basking Ridge | Lyons | 34.3 (55.2) | January 29, 1872 | | Lakeland Bus: 78 |
| NJ | 16 | Basking Ridge | Basking Ridge | 36.2 (58.3) | January 29, 1872 | | Lakeland Bus: 78 |
| NJ | 16 | Bernardsville | Bernardsville | 37.2 (59.9) | January 29, 1872 | | Lakeland Bus: 78 |
| NJ | 17 | Bernardsville | Mine Brook | | | | Former minor DL&W minor flag stop located at Whitenack Road |
| NJ | 17 | Far Hills | Far Hills | 41.6 (66.9) | October 10, 1890 | | Lakeland Bus: 78 |
| NJ | 18 | Peapack-Gladstone | Peapack | 43.9 (70.7) | October 10, 1890 | | |
| NJ | 18 | Peapack-Gladstone | Gladstone | 44.9 (72.3) | October 10, 1890 | | |

== Bibliography ==
- Douglass, A.M. (1912). The Railroad Trainman, Volume 29. Cleveland, Ohio: Brotherhood of Railroad Trainmen.
- Stern, Robert A.M.; Fishman, David; Tilove, Jacob (2013). Paradise Planned: The Garden Suburb and the Modern City. New York, New York: The Monacelli Press. ISBN 9781580933261.
