= Summit station (NJ Transit) =

NJ Transit rail station

Summit
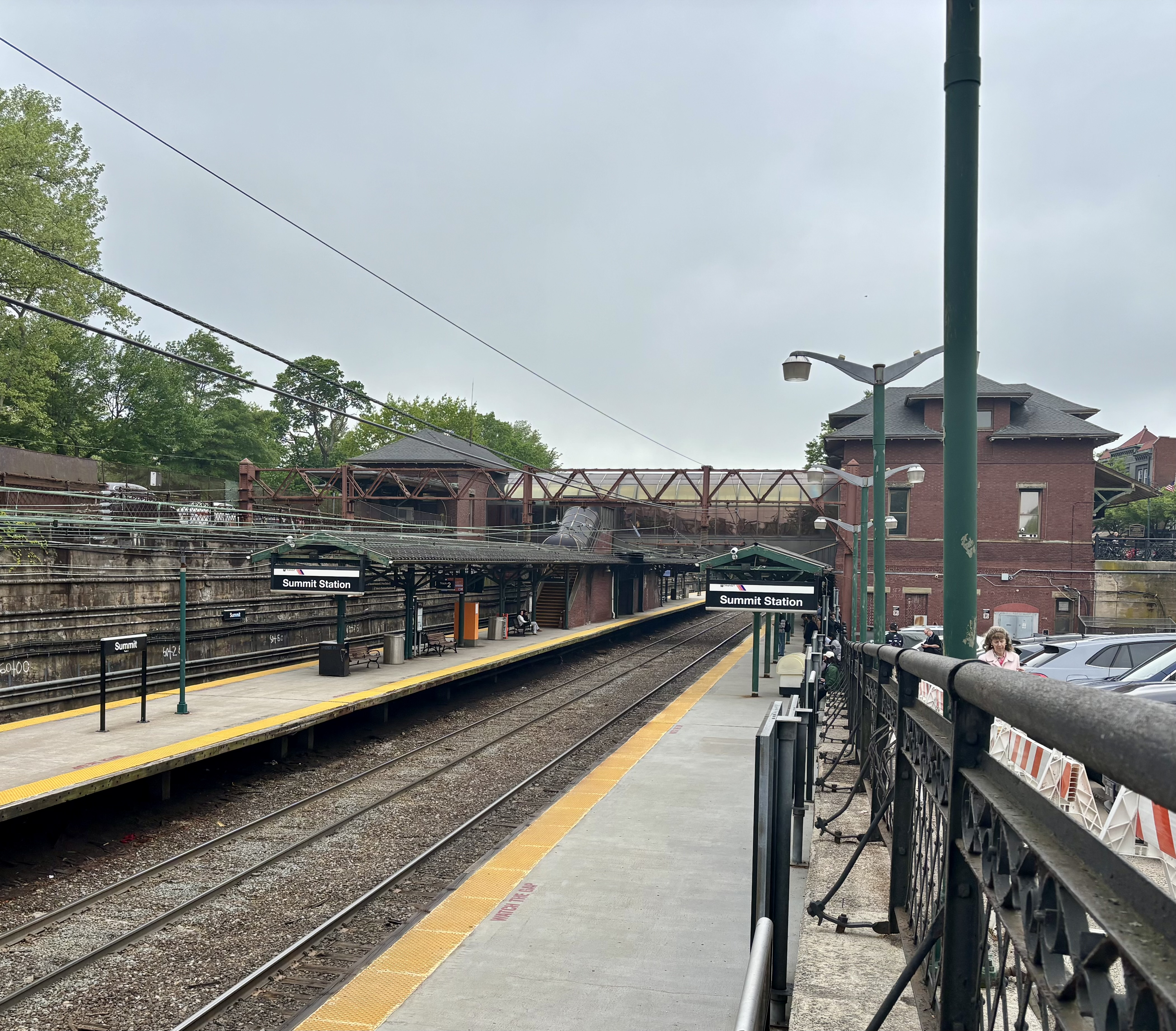

General information
- Location: 40 Union Place, Summit, New Jersey, U.S.
- Coordinates: 40°42′59.6″N 74°21′27.9″W
- Owner: New Jersey Transit
- Lines: Morristown Line and Gladstone Branch
- Platforms: 2 (1 island platform, 1 side platform)
- Tracks: 3
- Connections: NJT Bus: 70, 986; Lakeland: 78

Construction
- Accessible: yes

Other information
- Fare zone: 9

History
- Opened: September 17, 1837 (preliminary trip); September 28, 1837 (regular service)
- Rebuilt: January 6, 1905
- Electrified: December 18, 1930

Passengers
- 2025: 2604 (average weekday)
- Rank: 12 of 153

Services
| Preceding station | NJ Transit | Following station |
|---|---|---|
| New Providence toward Gladstone | Gladstone Branch | Short Hills weekdays toward New York or Hoboken |
| Chatham toward Hackettstown | Morristown Line | Short Hills toward New York or Hoboken |
Former services
| Preceding station | Delaware, Lackawanna and Western Railroad | Following station |
|---|---|---|
| Chatham toward Buffalo | Main Line | Short Hills toward Hoboken |
| New Providence toward Gladstone | Gladstone Branch | Roseville Avenue toward Hoboken |
Location

Summit station is an active commuter railroad station in the city of Summit, in Union County, in the U.S. state of New Jersey. Located in a cut between Union Place and Railroad Avenue in Summit, the station serves as the converge/diverge point of NJ Transit's Morris and Essex Lines: the Gladstone Branch and the Morristown Line. Both services east of Summit station share lines until their respective terminals at Hoboken or New York Penn Station. The lines westbound diverge near Summit Yard, with the Morristown Line heading for Hackettstown and the Gladstone Branch trains running to the Gladstone station. The station has three tracks and two high-level platforms (one island platform and one side platform).

Railroad service through Summit began with the extension of the Morris and Essex Railroad from Orange to Madison on September 28, 1837. The current station was built from 1902–1905 as part of a grade crossing elimination project funded by the Delaware, Lackawanna and Western Railroad.

== History ==
The station had served several Delaware, Lackawanna and Western Railroad, and then Erie-Lackwanna Railroad, named passenger trains. These included the Lake Cities, Owl/New York Mail, Twilight/Pocono Express and the DLW flagship train, the Phoebe Snow.

The station was cosmetically renovated for the 2005 PGA Championship at the Baltusrol Golf Club in nearby Springfield. Status screens were installed on the platforms to show train arrivals and platforms, which are still present, and fittings were painted. During that time, buses were used as the connection to go to and from the PGA Championship.

On December 20, 2018, New Jersey Governor Phil Murphy chose the station as the venue to sign legislation to reform the management of NJ Transit.

On the evening of September 26, 2025, a work train derailed near the station, disrupting train service from the station and stations east for multiple days.

== Station layout and services ==
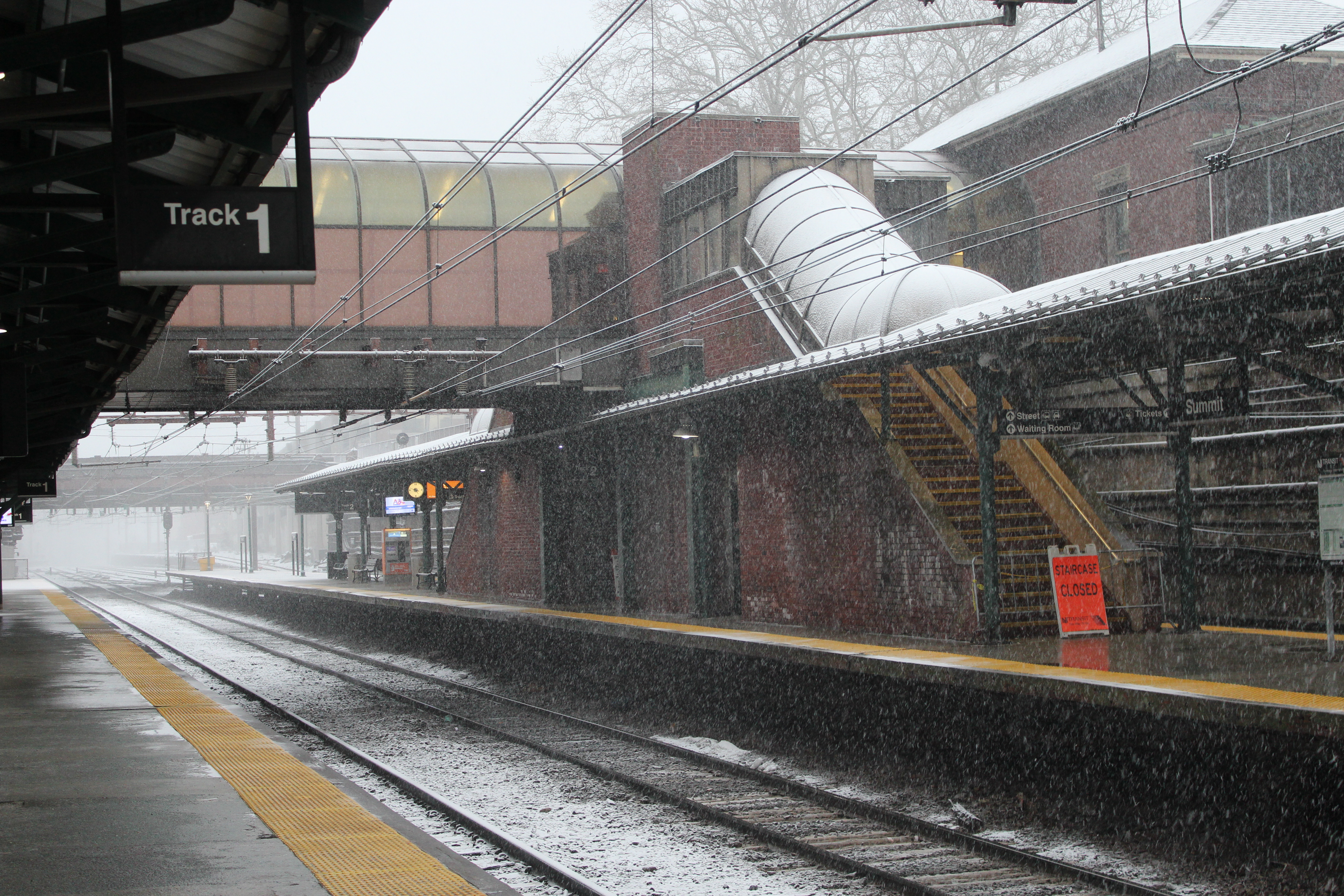
Track 2 and the Wall Track viewed from Track 1

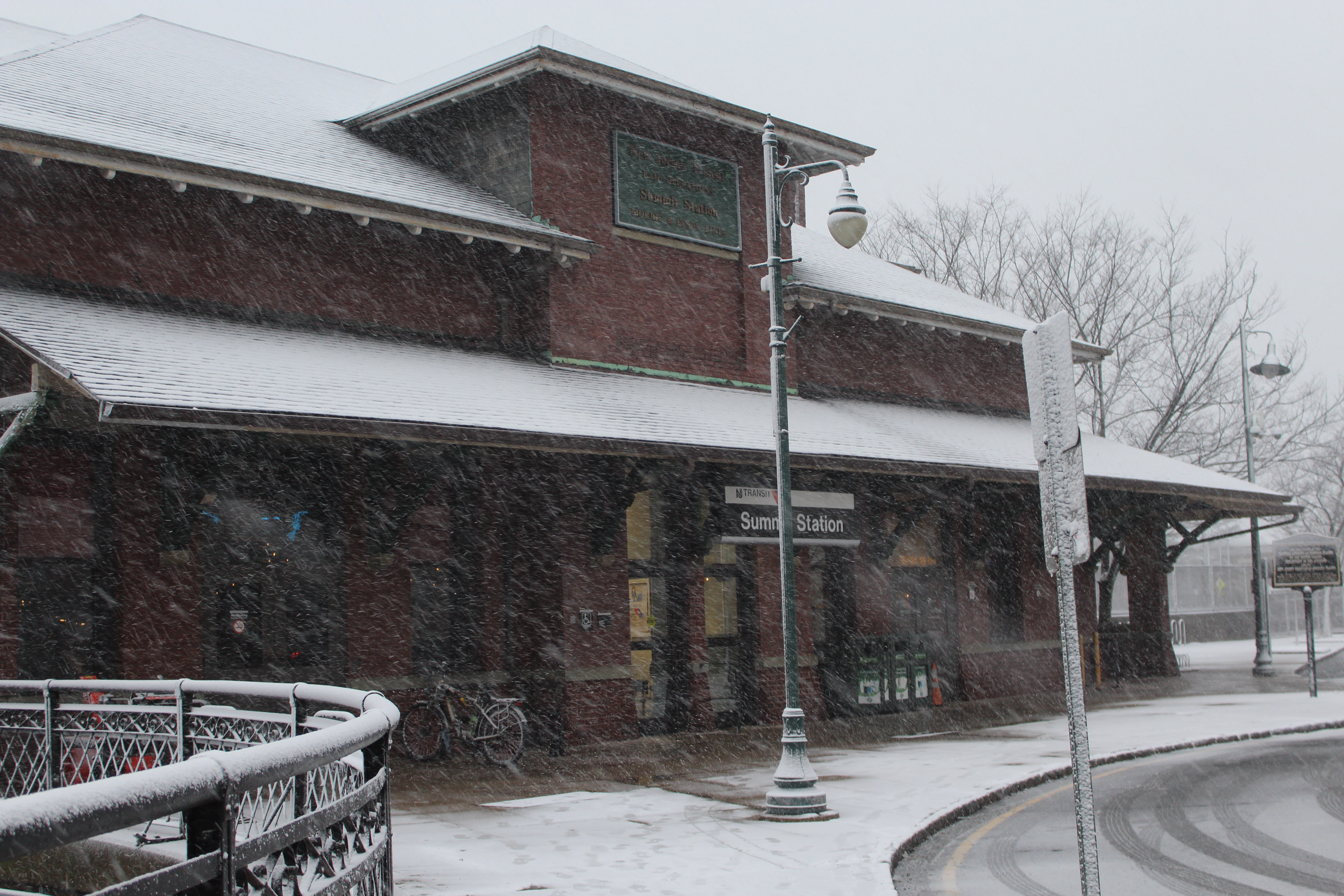
Stationhouse entrance from Union Pl

There are two platforms and three tracks: Track 1 is served by a side platform, while an island platform serves Track 2 and the Wall Track. Track 1 is accessible via the station overpass or directly from the Union Place parking lot, while the island platform can only be accessed via the overpass.

In the early morning hours, trains on the Gladstone Branch originate at Gladstone Station with a final destination to Hoboken Terminal. Trains going to New York Penn Station originate in Dover.

On weekends, the Gladstone Branch trains only operate between Summit and Gladstone, requiring passengers wishing to travel farther east to transfer across the platform to a Morristown Line train, which operates between Dover and New York (as well as Hoboken via a transfer at Newark Broad Street station).

The station has a small parking lot on its property that slopes down from Union Place. Another large lot is across Summit Avenue, accessible from Broad Street. In the 1990s, a multistory parking garage was built on part of the Broad Street lot. Following the September 11 attacks, the city made daily chalk marks on the tires of the many unclaimed vehicles to help identify those missing.

The station also has a waiting room with a small coffee and newspaper shop open during the morning rush hour and then through the evening rush hour.

== Gallery ==
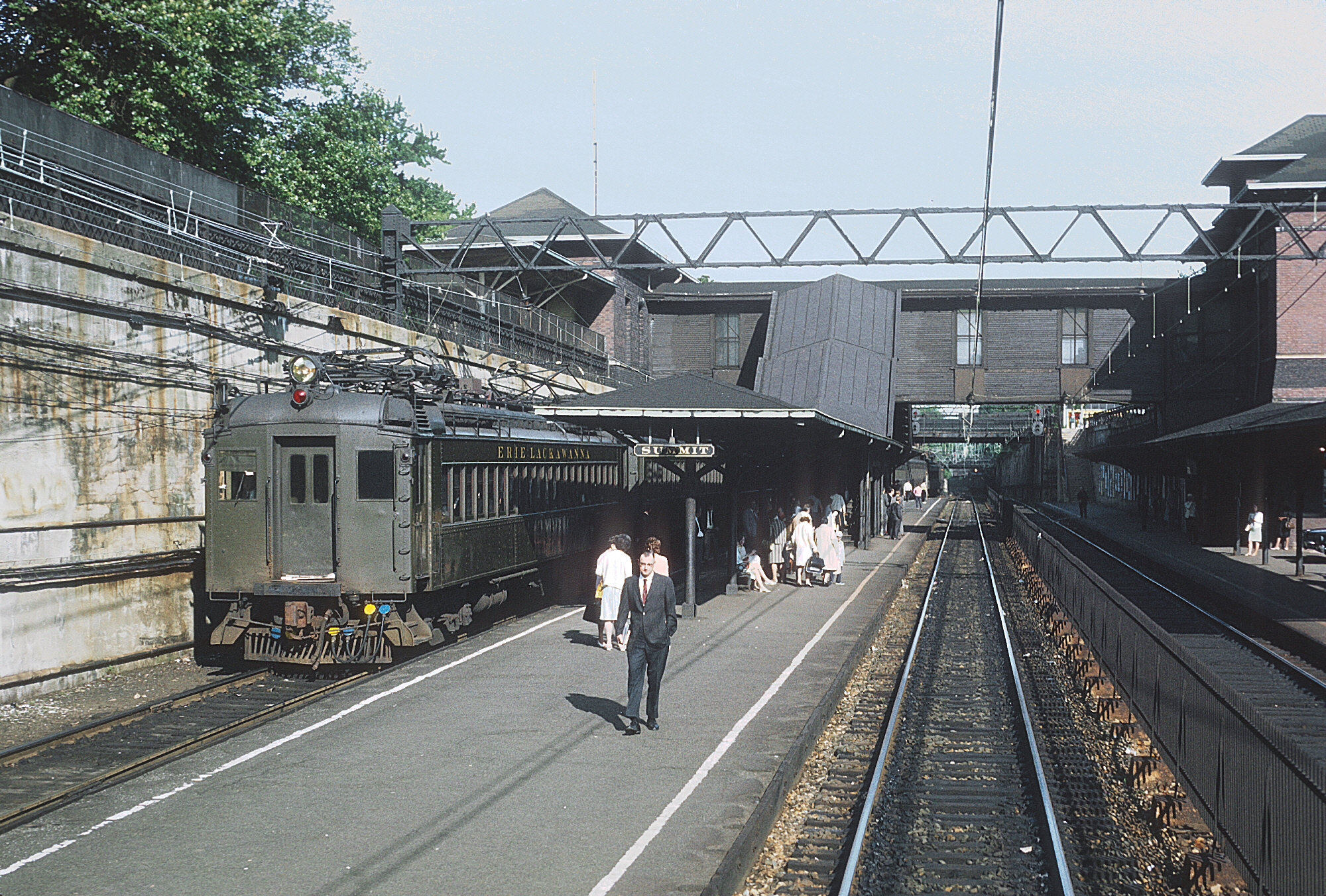
Summit station in 1968

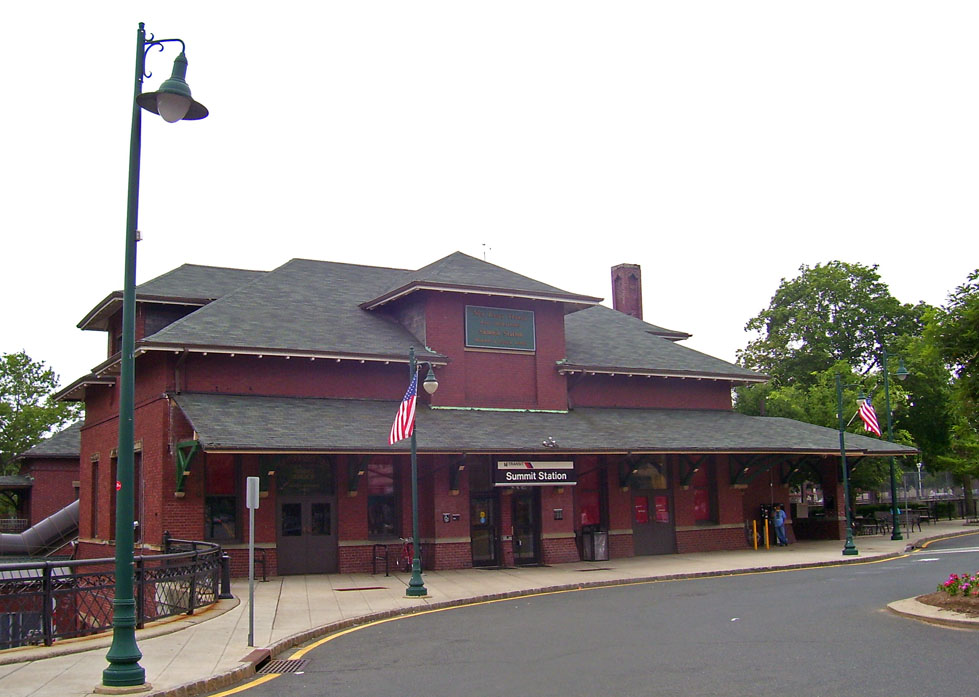
Station building on Union Place in downtown Summit

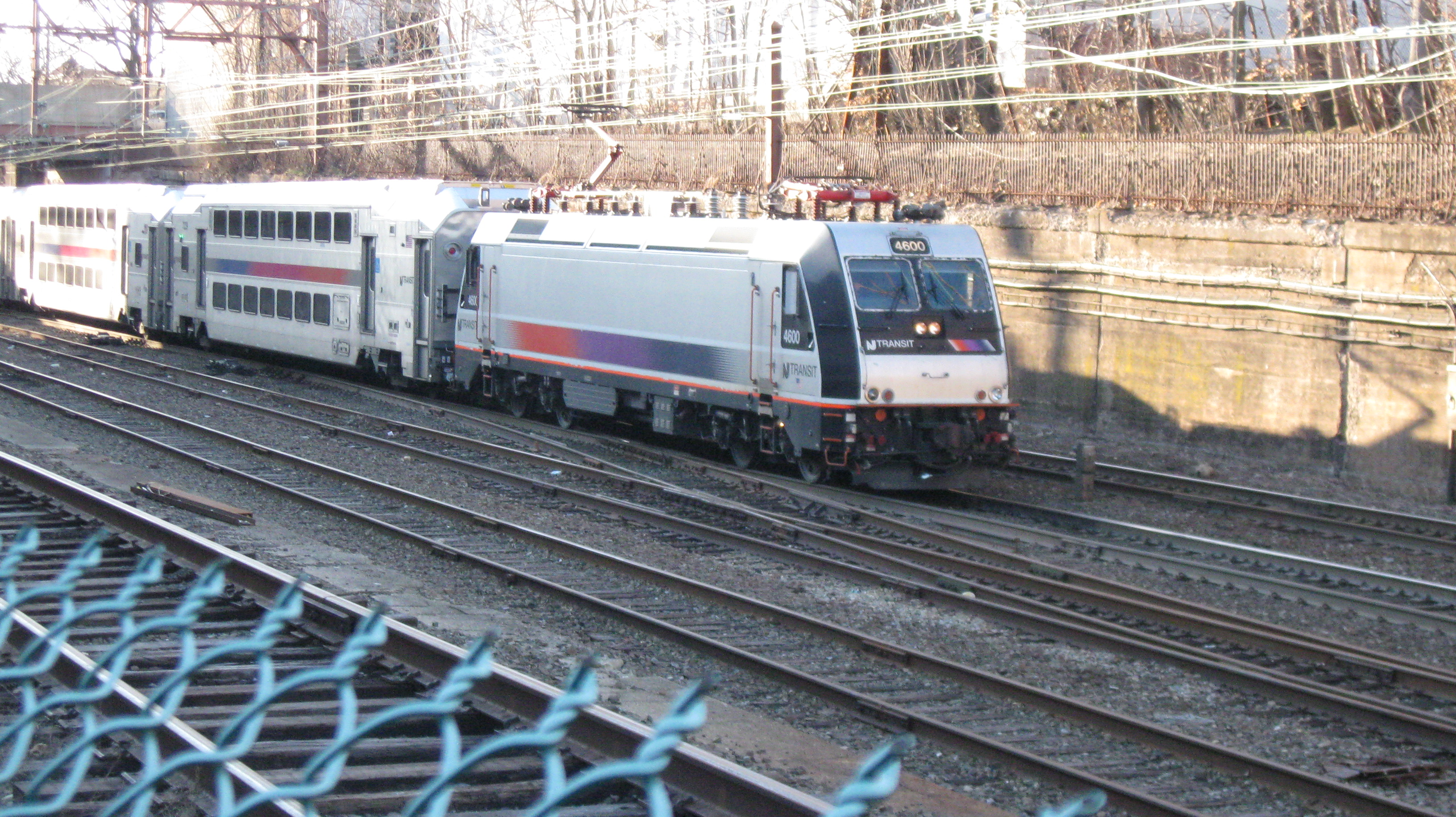
Midtown Direct train in Summit

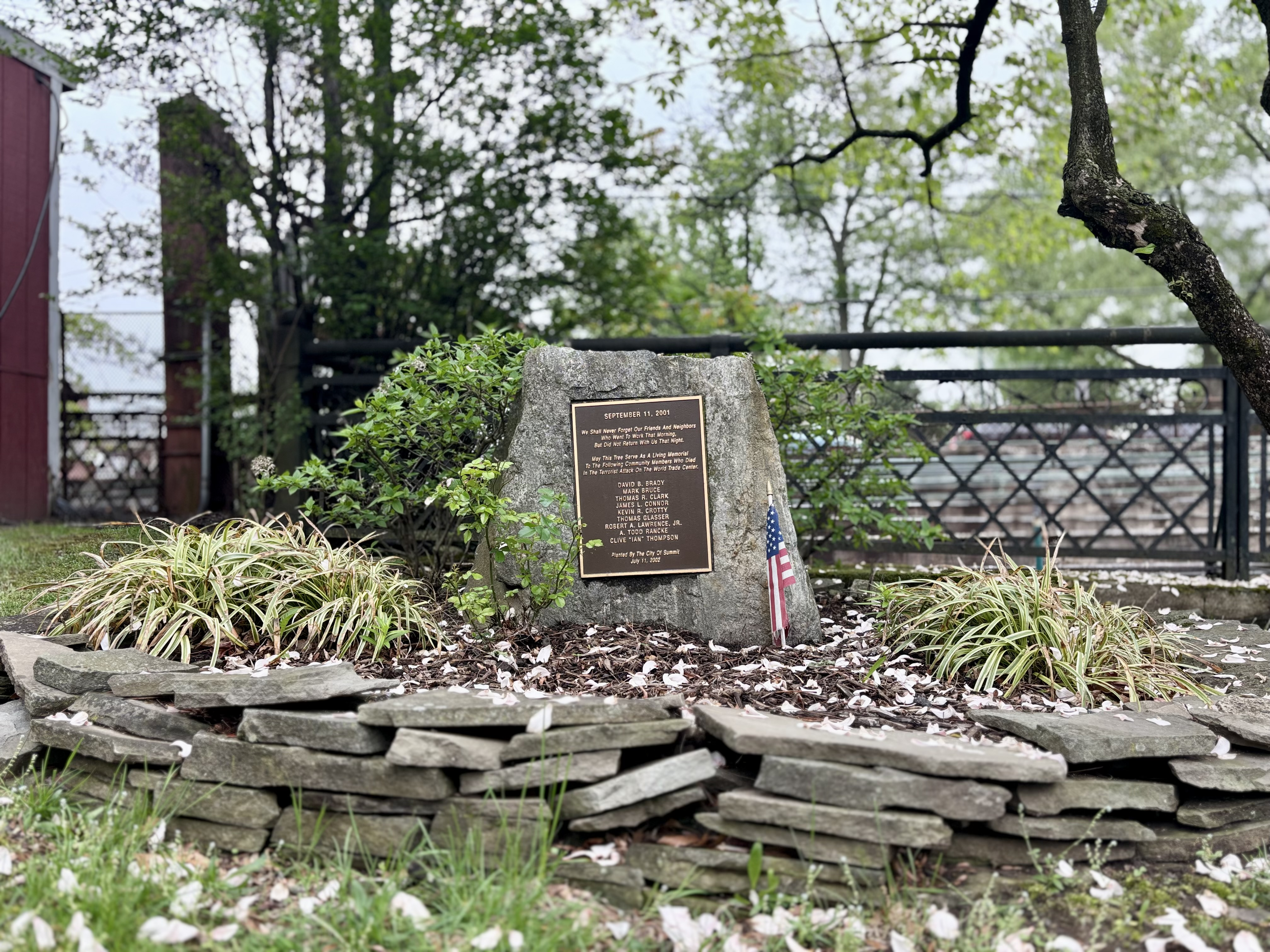
Summit's 9/11 memorial outside the station

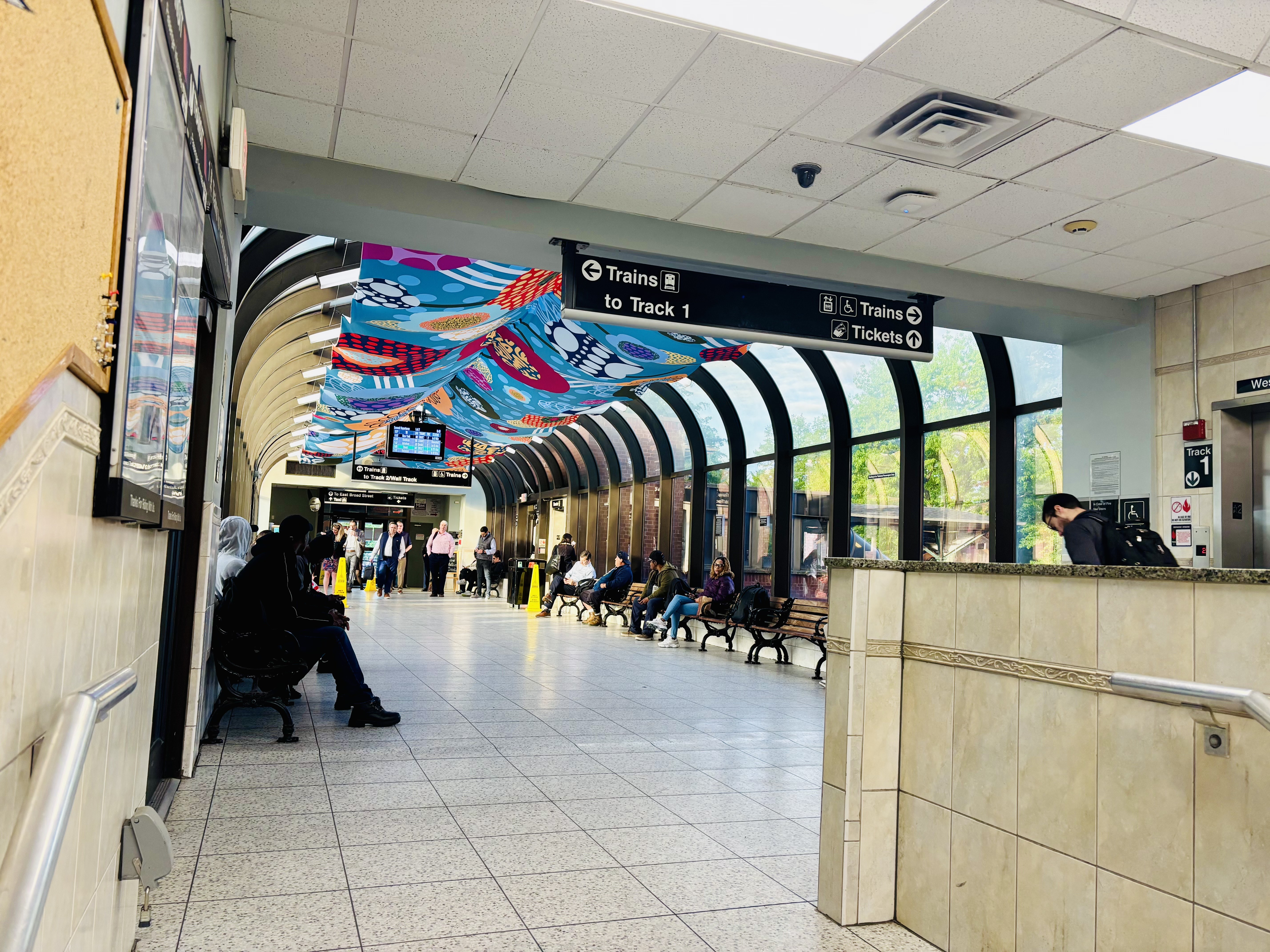
Interior of the station, with the cafe in the back

== Bibliography ==
- Douglass, A.M. (1912). The Railroad Trainman, Volume 29. Cleveland, Ohio: Brotherhood of Railroad Trainmen.
- Walker, Herbert T. (1902). "Early History of the Delaware, Lackawanna & Western Railroad and Its Locomotives - Part 2: The Morris and Essex Railroad". Railroad Gazette. 34.
