= List of NJ Transit railroad stations =

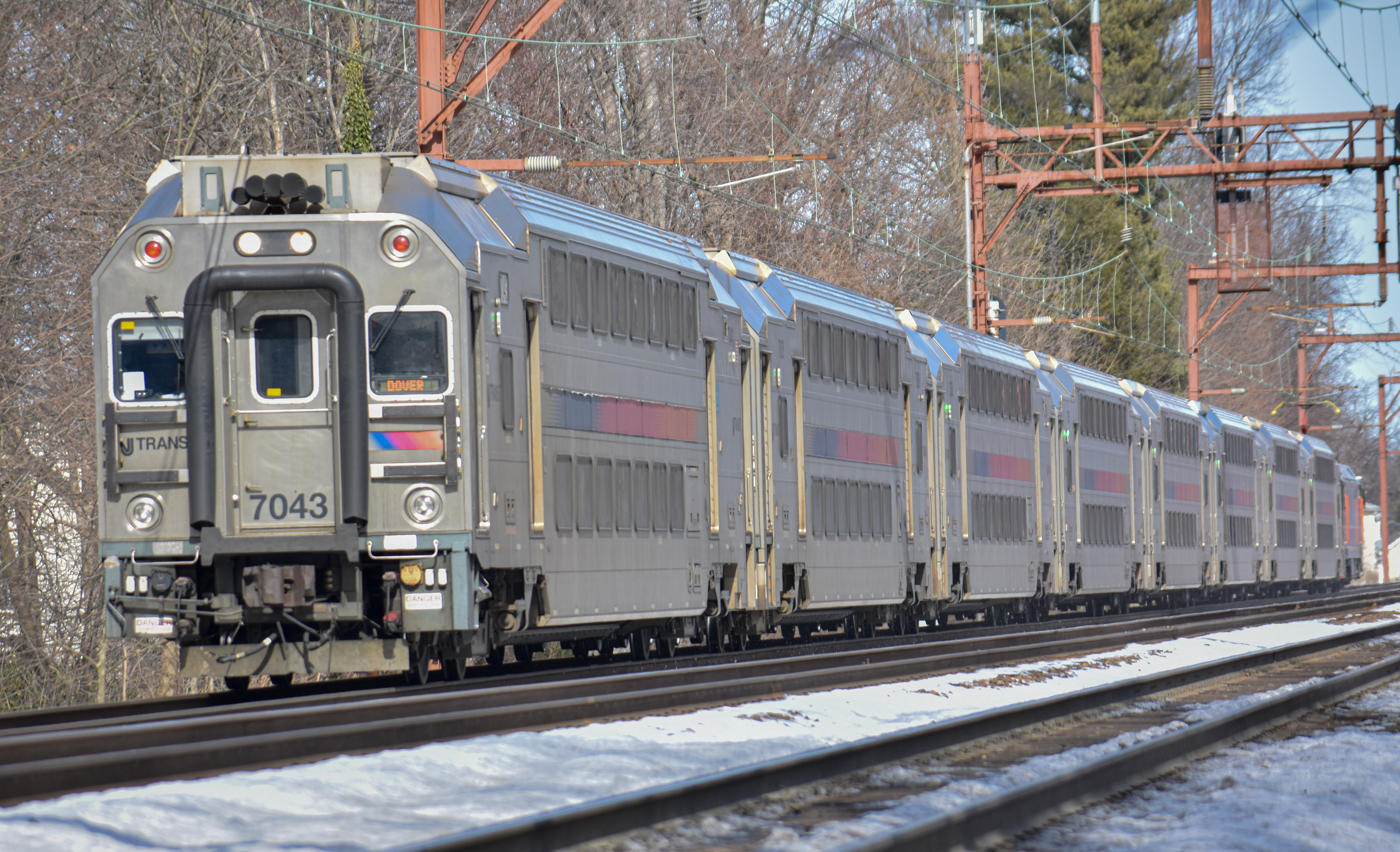
A Dover station-bound train on the Morristown Line in February 2021

NJ Transit Rail Operations provides passenger service on 12 lines at a total of 165 stations, some operated in conjunction with Amtrak and Metro-North Railroad.

NJ Transit Rail Operations was established by NJ Transit to run commuter rail operations in New Jersey. In January 1983 it took over operation from Conrail, which itself had been formed in 1976 through the merger of a number of financially troubled railroads and had been operating commuter railroad service under contract from the New Jersey Department of Transportation. Soon after its creation, NJT commissioned a survey of operating stations, 53 of which were eventually nominated and listed on the state and federal registers of historic places in 1984. Since 2009, NJ Transit is a stakeholder in the state's "smart growth" transit-oriented development initiatives, its transit hubs forming the basis for transit villages.

The regional rail network, which serves the northern and central parts of New Jersey and Rockland and Orange counties in New York, radiates from Hoboken Terminal in Hoboken, New York Penn Station and Newark Penn Station. Lines intersect at Secaucus Junction. Service from Atlantic City to Philadelphia is provided by one line separate from the rest of the NJ Transit system, though SEPTA Regional Rail service connects Philadelphia and Trenton. Amtrak provides service in New Jersey along the Northeast Corridor between Newark and Trenton and at intermediate points.

Since its inception, NJ Transit has closed several stations and opened new ones reflecting infrastructure improvements and discontinuance or additions in service. Some station locations, not listed here, became part of the Hudson-Bergen Light Rail and the River Line, both of which were largely built along existing railroad rights-of-way. New and re-opened stations are being built or proposed along planned expansions and extensions, notably the Lackawanna Cut-Off, which is under reconstruction. Restoration of passenger service along the West Trenton Line, Monmouth-Ocean-Middlesex project right-of-ways, and the Raritan Valley/Lehigh Line, which include the reactivation/construction of new stations, have all been considered but not advanced.

== Services ==
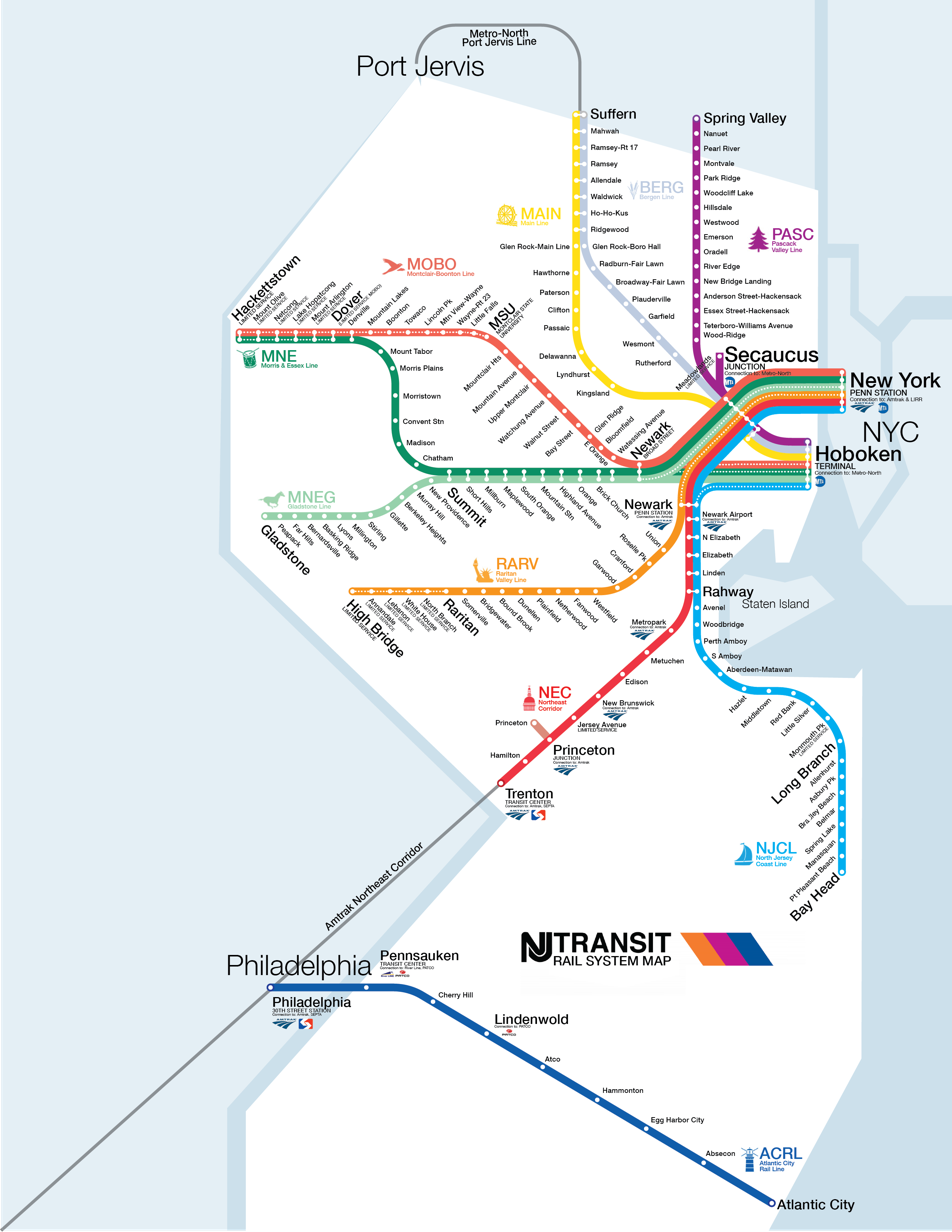
NJT operates along 12 lines when including the NEC's Princeton Branch, the shortest commuter rail service in the US, as well as excursion service to the Meadowlands providing service to 166 stations

Line	Inbound terminal(s)	Outbound terminal(s)
Atlantic City Line	30th Street Station	Atlantic City
Bergen County Line	Hoboken	Suffern (weekdays); Waldwick
Gladstone Branch	Hoboken (weekdays); New York Penn (limited weekdays); Summit (weekends)	Gladstone; Bernardsville (limited weekdays)
Main Line	Hoboken	Suffern; Waldwick (limited service)
Meadowlands Rail Line (MetLife Stadium events only)	Secaucus Junction	Meadowlands
Montclair–Boonton Line	New York Penn (weekdays); Hoboken	Montclair State University (weekdays); Lake Hopatcong, Mount Olive, or Hackettstown (limited weekdays); Bay Street (weekends)
Morristown Line	New York Penn; Hoboken (limited weekdays)	Dover; Summit (short-turn weekdays); Lake Hopatcong or Hackettstown (limited weekdays)
Northeast Corridor Line	New York Penn	Trenton Transit Center; Jersey Avenue (short-turn weekdays)
North Jersey Coast Line	New York Penn	Long Branch; South Amboy (short-turn weekdays); Bay Head (limited weekday service); Rahway (short-turn weekends)
North Jersey Coast Line (Bay Head Shuttle)	Long Branch	Bay Head
Pascack Valley Line	Hoboken	Spring Valley; New Bridge Landing (two weekday round trips)
Port Jervis Line	Hoboken	Port Jervis; Middletown–Town of Wallkill (limited service)
Princeton Branch	Princeton Junction	Princeton
Raritan Valley Line	Newark Penn; New York Penn (limited weekdays)	Raritan; High Bridge (limited weekdays)

== Station designations ==
=== Historic register listings ===
- Operating Passenger Railroad Stations
- U.S. National Register of Historic Places
- New Jersey Register of Historic Places
- Location: New Jersey USA
- Architectural style: various
- NRHP reference No.: 64000496
- NJRHP No.: 5080

Significant dates
- Added to NRHP: June 22, 1984 & September 29, 1984
- Designated NJRHP: June 12, 1970

In 1981, NJ Transit commissioned the State Historic Preservation Office to conduct a study of 112 train stations under its jurisdiction built before World War II that were still in operation. Many of thematic nomination stations are listed on the New Jersey Register of Historic Places (ID#5080) on March 17, 1984. The SHPO recommended that fifty-three stations, some of which had already been listed, be included in a thematic nomination for listing on the National Register of Historic Places. Forty stations were added on June 22, 1984 and the remainder added on September 29, 1984. (#64000496) Most were along former lines and heritage railroads that had become part of NJ Transit, while West Trenton is used by SEPTA.

The oldest station building, built in 1868 at the Ramsey-Main Street station, was not listed. The oldest active station to be listed on NRHP was Hackensack's 1869-built Anderson Street station, until it was destroyed in a fire and explosion in 2009, and thus was delisted. Proposals to revive service on the West Trenton Line and Lackawanna Cut-Off include the re-use of some listed stations in both New Jersey and northeastern Pennsylvania.

Two significant individually-listed historic stations include Newark Penn Station and Hoboken Terminal, both of which are major stations that also serve as terminals for light rail, PATH subway trains, and in the case of Hoboken, ferries across the Hudson River to Pier 11 at Wall Street and the Battery Park City Ferry Terminal.

=== Transit villages ===
The New Jersey Department of Transportation established the Transit Village Initiative in 1999 to promote transit-oriented development (TOD), offering multi-agency assistance and grants to municipalities for projects which fulfill certain conditions to promote higher density development and use of public transportation within a 1 mile (1.6 km) radius of a transit hub, specifying appropriate mixed land-use strategy, available property, station-area management, and commitment to affordable housing, job growth/maintenance, and cultural activities. Transit village development must also preserve the architectural integrity of historically significant buildings and the landscape. As of 2015, the state had made 30 transit village designations, many of which are centered around "Main Street" or central business district train stations. Since 2008, there has been significant population growth and increased ridership in neighborhoods around stations.

== Active stations ==
=== Operated by NJ Transit ===
Station	Lines	Location	Former railroad	Station opened	Notes
Aberdeen–Matawan	North Jersey Coast Line	Matawan	CNJ	July 1, 1875	Originally named Matawan
Absecon	Atlantic City Line	Absecon	PRSL	September 17, 1989	
Allendale	Bergen County Line; Main Line	Allendale	Erie Railroad	October 19, 1848	
Allenhurst	North Jersey Coast Line	Allenhurst	CNJ	May 17, 1897	
Anderson Street	Pascack Valley Line	Hackensack	Erie Railroad	September 7, 1869	Original 1869-built station house destroyed in a January 2009 fire
Annandale	Raritan Valley Line	Annandale	CNJ	July 4, 1852	
Asbury Park	North Jersey Coast Line	Asbury Park	CNJ	August 25, 1875	
Atco	Atlantic City Line	Waterford Township	PRSL	September 17, 1989	
Atlantic City	Atlantic City Line	Atlantic City	PRSL	September 17, 1989	Replaced old PRSL depot, which had replaced former Union Station
Avenel	North Jersey Coast Line	Woodbridge Township	Pennsylvania Railroad	1867	Station house opened 1940
Basking Ridge	Gladstone Branch	Bernards Township	Lackawanna Railroad	January 29, 1872	
Bay Head	North Jersey Coast Line	Bay Head	CNJ	August 1, 1882	
Bay Street	Montclair–Boonton Line	Montclair	Conrail	March 2, 1981	
Belmar	North Jersey Coast Line	Belmar	CNJ	September 14, 1875	
Berkeley Heights	Gladstone Branch	Berkeley Heights	Lackawanna Railroad	January 29, 1872	
Bernardsville	Gladstone Branch	Bernardsville	Lackawanna Railroad	January 29, 1872	
Bloomfield	Montclair–Boonton Line	Bloomfield	Lackawanna Railroad	December 18, 1855	
Boonton	Montclair–Boonton Line	Boonton	Lackawanna Railroad	September 5, 1867	
Bound Brook	Raritan Valley Line	Bound Brook	CNJ	January 1, 1840	
Bradley Beach	North Jersey Coast Line	Bradley Beach	CNJ	June 24, 1893	
Brick Church	Morristown Line; Gladstone Branch	East Orange	Lackawanna Railroad	November 19, 1836	
Bridgewater	Raritan Valley Line	Bridgewater Township	CNJ	July 17, 2000	Replaced former Calco station for American Cyanamid; Proposed West Trenton Line (NJ Transit) stop
Broadway	Bergen County Line	Fair Lawn	Erie Railroad	October 1, 1881	
Chatham	Morristown Line	Chatham Borough	Lackawanna Railroad	September 17, 1837	
Cherry Hill	Atlantic City Line	Cherry Hill	PRSL	July 2, 1994	
Clifton	Main Line	Clifton	Lackawanna Railroad	December 14, 1870	
Convent Station	Morristown Line	Morris Township	Lackawanna Railroad	1867	
Cranford	Raritan Valley Line	Cranford	CNJ	January 1, 1839	
Delawanna	Main Line	Clifton	Lackawanna Railroad	December 14, 1870	
Denville	Morristown Line; Montclair–Boonton Line	Denville Township	Lackawanna Railroad	July 4, 1848	
Dover	Montclair–Boonton Line; Morristown Line	Dover	Lackawanna Railroad	July 31, 1848	
Dunellen	Raritan Valley Line	Dunellen	CNJ	January 1, 1840	
East Orange	Morristown Line; Gladstone Branch	East Orange	Lackawanna Railroad	November 19, 1836	
Edison	Northeast Corridor Line	Edison	Pennsylvania Railroad		
Egg Harbor City	Atlantic City Line	Egg Harbor City	PRSL	September 17, 1989	
Elberon	North Jersey Coast Line	Long Branch	CNJ	August 25, 1875	
Elizabeth	Northeast Corridor Line; North Jersey Coast Line	Elizabeth	Pennsylvania Railroad	December 21, 1835	
Emerson	Pascack Valley Line	Emerson	Erie Railroad	March 4, 1870	
Essex Street	Pascack Valley Line	Hackensack	Erie Railroad	January 21, 1861	
Fanwood	Raritan Valley Line	Fanwood	CNJ	January 1, 1839	
Far Hills	Gladstone Branch	Far Hills	Lackawanna Railroad	October 10, 1890	
Garfield	Bergen County Line	Garfield	Erie Railroad	October 1, 1881	
Garwood	Raritan Valley Line	Garwood	CNJ	August 1892	
Gillette	Gladstone Branch	Long Hill Township	Lackawanna Railroad	January 29, 1872	
Gladstone	Gladstone Branch	Peapack-Gladstone	Lackawanna Railroad	October 10, 1890	
Glen Ridge	Montclair–Boonton Line	Glen Ridge	Lackawanna Railroad	1860	
Glen Rock–Boro Hall	Bergen County Line	Glen Rock	Erie Railroad	October 1, 1881	
Glen Rock–Main Line	Main Line	Glen Rock	Erie Railroad	October 19, 1848	
Hackettstown	Morristown Line; Montclair–Boonton Line	Hackettstown	Lackawanna Railroad	October 31, 1994	
Hamilton	Northeast Corridor Line	Hamilton Township	Pennsylvania Railroad	February 21, 1999	
Hammonton	Atlantic City Line	Hammonton	PRSL	September 17, 1989	
Hawthorne	Main Line	Hawthorne	Erie Railroad	October 19, 1848	
Hazlet	North Jersey Coast Line	Hazlet	CNJ	July 1, 1875	
High Bridge	Raritan Valley Line	High Bridge	CNJ	1856	
Highland Avenue	Morristown Line; Gladstone Branch	Orange	Lackawanna Railroad		
Hillsdale	Pascack Valley Line	Hillsdale	Erie Railroad	March 4, 1870	
Hoboken Terminal	Bergen County Line; Gladstone Branch; Main Line; Meadowlands Rail Line; Montclair–Boonton Line; Morristown Line; Pascack Valley Line; Port Jervis Line; Raritan Valley Line	Hoboken	Lackawanna Railroad	February 24, 1907	
Ho-Ho-Kus	Main Line; Bergen County Line	Ho-Ho-Kus	Erie Railroad	October 19, 1848	
Jersey Avenue	Northeast Corridor Line	New Brunswick	Pennsylvania Railroad	October 24, 1963	
Lake Hopatcong	Morristown Line; Montclair–Boonton Line	Roxbury	Lackawanna Railroad	1882	
Lebanon	Raritan Valley Line	Lebanon	CNJ	July 4, 1852	
Lincoln Park	Montclair–Boonton Line	Lincoln Park	Lackawanna Railroad	December 14, 1870	
Linden	Northeast Corridor Line; North Jersey Coast Line	Linden	Pennsylvania Railroad		
Lindenwold	Atlantic City Line	Lindenwold	PRSL	September 17, 1989	Connection available to PATCO Speedline
Little Falls	Montclair–Boonton Line	Little Falls	Erie Railroad	January 1, 1873	
Little Silver	North Jersey Coast Line	Little Silver	CNJ	July 1, 1875	
Long Branch	North Jersey Coast Line	Long Branch	CNJ	July 1, 1875	
Lyndhurst	Main Line	Lyndhurst	Lackawanna Railroad	July 8, 2025	
Lyons	Gladstone Branch	Bernards Township	Lackawanna Railroad	January 29, 1872	
Madison	Morristown Line	Madison	Lackawanna Railroad	September 17, 1837	
Mahwah	Main Line; Bergen County Line	Mahwah	Erie Railroad	October 19, 1848	
Manasquan	North Jersey Coast Line	Manasquan	CNJ	July 29, 1880	
Maplewood	Morristown Line; Gladstone Branch	Maplewood	Lackawanna Railroad	September 17, 1837	
Meadowlands	Meadowlands Rail Line	East Rutherford		July 26, 2009	Located on a spur from the Pascack Valley Line
Metropark	Northeast Corridor Line	Woodbridge Township	Pennsylvania Railroad	November 14, 1971	
Metuchen	Northeast Corridor Line	Metuchen	Pennsylvania Railroad	July 11, 1836	
Middletown	North Jersey Coast Line	Middletown Township	CNJ	July 1, 1875	
Millburn	Morristown Line; Gladstone Branch	Millburn	Lackawanna Railroad	September 17, 1837	
Millington	Gladstone Branch	Long Hill Township	Lackawanna Railroad	January 29, 1872	
Monmouth Park	North Jersey Coast Line	Oceanport	CNJ		
Montclair Heights	Montclair–Boonton Line	Montclair	Erie Railroad		
Montclair State University	Montclair–Boonton Line	Montclair	Erie Railroad	April 28, 2003	
Montvale	Pascack Valley Line	Montvale	Erie Railroad	May 27, 1871	
Morris Plains	Morristown Line	Morris Plains	Lackawanna Railroad	July 4, 1848	
Morristown	Morristown Line	Morristown	Lackawanna Railroad	January 1, 1838	
Mount Arlington	Morristown Line; Montclair–Boonton Line	Mount Arlington	Lackawanna Railroad	January 21, 2008	
Mount Olive	Morristown Line; Montclair–Boonton Line	Mount Olive Township	Lackawanna Railroad	October 31, 1994	
Mount Tabor	Morristown Line	Denville Township	Lackawanna Railroad		
Mountain Avenue	Montclair–Boonton Line	Montclair	Erie Railroad	January 1, 1873	
Mountain Lakes	Montclair–Boonton Line	Mountain Lakes	Lackawanna Railroad	November 10, 1912	
Mountain Station	Morristown Line; Gladstone Branch	South Orange	Lackawanna Railroad	September 17, 1837	
Mountain View–Wayne	Montclair–Boonton Line	Wayne	Erie Railroad	January 1, 1873	
Murray Hill	Gladstone Branch	New Providence	Lackawanna Railroad	January 29, 1872	
Netcong	Morristown Line; Montclair–Boonton Line	Netcong	Lackawanna Railroad	January 16, 1854	
Netherwood	Raritan Valley Line	Plainfield	CNJ		
New Bridge Landing	Pascack Valley Line	River Edge	Erie Railroad	March 4, 1870	
New Brunswick	Northeast Corridor Line	New Brunswick	Pennsylvania Railroad	January 1, 1838	
New Providence	Gladstone Branch	New Providence	Lackawanna Railroad	January 29, 1872	
Newark Broad Street	Montclair–Boonton Line; Morristown Line; Gladstone Branch	Newark	Lackawanna Railroad	November 19, 1836	
Newark Penn Station	Northeast Corridor Line; North Jersey Coast Line; Raritan Valley Line	Newark	Pennsylvania Railroad	March 24, 1935	
North Branch	Raritan Valley Line	Branchburg	CNJ	September 25, 1848	
North Elizabeth	Northeast Corridor Line; North Jersey Coast Line	Elizabeth	Pennsylvania Railroad		
Oradell	Pascack Valley Line	Oradell	Erie Railroad	March 4, 1870	
Orange	Morristown Line; Gladstone Branch	Orange	Lackawanna Railroad	November 19, 1836	
Park Ridge	Pascack Valley Line	Park Ridge	Erie Railroad	May 27, 1871	
Passaic	Main Line	Passaic	Lackawanna Railroad	December 14, 1870	
Paterson	Main Line	Paterson	Erie Railroad	May 28, 1832	
Peapack	Gladstone Branch	Peapack-Gladstone	Lackawanna Railroad	October 10, 1890	
Pennsauken Transit Center	Atlantic City Line	Pennsauken Township	PRSL	October 14, 2013	Connection available with the River Line.
Perth Amboy	North Jersey Coast Line	Perth Amboy	CNJ	June 28, 1875	
Plainfield	Raritan Valley Line	Plainfield	CNJ	January 1, 1839	
Plauderville	Bergen County Line	Garfield	Erie Railroad		
Point Pleasant Beach	North Jersey Coast Line	Point Pleasant Beach	CNJ	July 29, 1880	
Princeton	Princeton Branch	Princeton	Pennsylvania Railroad	May 29, 1865	
Princeton Junction	Northeast Corridor Line; Princeton Branch	West Windsor	Pennsylvania Railroad	November 23, 1863	
Radburn	Bergen County Line	Radburn	Erie Railroad	October 1, 1881	
Rahway	Northeast Corridor Line; North Jersey Coast Line	Rahway	Pennsylvania Railroad	January 1, 1836	
Ramsey	Main Line; Bergen County Line	Ramsey	Erie Railroad	October 19, 1848	
Ramsey Route 17	Main Line; Bergen County Line	Ramsey	Erie Railroad	August 22, 2004	
Raritan	Raritan Valley Line	Raritan	CNJ		
Red Bank	North Jersey Coast Line	Red Bank	CNJ	July 1, 1875	
Ridgewood	Main Line; Bergen County Line	Ridgewood	Erie Railroad	October 19, 1848	
River Edge	Pascack Valley Line	River Edge	Erie Railroad	March 4, 1870	
Roselle Park	Raritan Valley Line	Roselle Park	Lehigh Valley Railroad	February 3, 1891	
Rutherford	Bergen County Line	Rutherford	Erie Railroad	December 4, 1833	
Secaucus Junction	Bergen County Line; Gladstone Branch; Montclair–Boonton Line; Morristown Line; Main Line; Meadowlands Rail Line; Northeast Corridor Line; North Jersey Coast Line; Pascack Valley Line; Port Jervis Line; Raritan Valley Line	Secaucus	Pennsylvania Railroad; Erie Railroad	December 15, 2003	
Short Hills	Morristown Line; Gladstone Branch	Short Hills	Lackawanna Railroad	July 1879	
Somerville	Raritan Valley Line	Somerville	CNJ	January 1, 1842	
South Amboy	North Jersey Coast Line	South Amboy	CNJ		
South Orange	Morristown Line; Gladstone Branch	South Orange	Lackawanna Railroad	September 17, 1837	
Spring Lake	North Jersey Coast Line	Spring Lake	CNJ	October 11, 1875	
Stirling	Gladstone Branch	Long Hill Township	Lackawanna Railroad	January 29, 1872	
Suffern	Main Line; Bergen County Line	Suffern, NY	Erie Railroad	June 30, 1841	
Summit	Morristown Line; Gladstone Branch	Summit	Lackawanna Railroad	September 17, 1837	
Teterboro	Pascack Valley Line	Teterboro	Erie Railroad	May 29, 1904	
Towaco	Montclair–Boonton Line	Montville	Lackawanna Railroad	December 14, 1870	
Trenton Transit Center	Northeast Corridor Line	Trenton	Pennsylvania Railroad	April 20, 1863	
Union	Raritan Valley Line	Union Township	Lehigh Valley Railroad	April 28, 2003	
Upper Montclair	Montclair–Boonton Line	Montclair	Erie Railroad	January 1, 1873	
Waldwick	Main Line; Bergen County Line	Waldwick	Erie Railroad	1886	
Walnut Street	Montclair–Boonton Line	Montclair	Erie Railroad	January 1, 1873	
Watchung Avenue	Montclair–Boonton Line	Montclair	Erie Railroad	January 1, 1873	
Watsessing Avenue	Montclair–Boonton Line	Bloomfield	Lackawanna Railroad	December 18, 1855	
Wayne Route 23	Montclair–Boonton Line	Wayne	Erie Railroad	January 12, 2008	
Wesmont	Bergen County Line	Wood-Ridge	Erie Railroad	May 15, 2016	
Westfield	Raritan Valley Line	Westfield	CNJ	January 1, 1839	
Westwood	Pascack Valley Line	Westwood	Erie Railroad	March 4, 1870	
White House	Raritan Valley Line	Whitehouse Station	CNJ	September 25, 1848	
Wood-Ridge	Pascack Valley Line	Wood-Ridge	Erie Railroad	January 21, 1861	
Woodbridge	North Jersey Coast Line	Woodbridge Township	Pennsylvania Railroad	October 11, 1864	
Woodcliff Lake	Pascack Valley Line	Woodcliff Lake	Erie Railroad	May 27, 1871	

=== Operated by others ===
Metro-North Railroad's West-of-Hudson service is operated by NJ Transit. NJ Transit owns the Pascack Valley Line right-of-way and stations, which are leased to Metro-North. On the Port Jervis Line north of Suffern, Metro-North owns or leases the ROW under an agreement with Norfolk Southern Railway and operates the stations. Two SEPTA Regional Rail lines terminate at stations in New Jersey, one of which is not served NJ Transit.

NJ Transit and Metro-North Railroad also operated a joint Train to the Game service for football games at the Meadowlands Sports Complex with stops at New Haven, West Haven, Bridgeport, Fairfield, Fairfield Metro, Westport, South Norwalk, Darien, Stamford, Greenwich, Rye, and Larchmont on the New Haven Line.

Station	Operator	Service	Location	Former railroad right-of-way	Opened	Notes
30th Street Station	Amtrak	Atlantic City Line	Philadelphia, PA	Pennsylvania Railroad; PRSL	March 12, 1933	
Campbell Hall	Metro-North Railroad	Port Jervis Line	Hamptonburgh, NY	Erie Railroad	April 18, 1983	
Harriman	Metro-North Railroad	Port Jervis Line	Harriman, NY	Erie Railroad	April 18, 1983	Replaced Harriman (Erie)
Middletown–Town of Wallkill	Metro-North Railroad	Port Jervis Line	Walkill, NY	Erie Railroad	April 18, 1983	Replaced Middletown (Erie)
Nanuet	Metro-North Railroad	Pascack Valley Line	Nanuet, NY	Erie Railroad	June 30, 1841	
Newark Liberty International Airport	PANYNJ	Northeast Corridor Line; North Jersey Coast Line	Newark	Pennsylvania Railroad	October 21, 2001	Built by PANYNJ to connect Newark Airport via AirTrain Newark
Otisville	Metro-North Railroad	Port Jervis Line	Otisville, NY	Erie Railroad	November 1, 1846	
Pearl River	Metro-North Railroad	Pascack Valley Line	Pearl River, NY	Erie Railroad	May 27, 1871	
New York Penn Station	Amtrak	Northeast Corridor Line; North Jersey Coast Line; Montclair–Boonton Line; Morristown Line; Gladstone Branch; Raritan Valley Line	New York, NY	Pennsylvania Railroad	September 8, 1910	
Port Jervis	Metro-North Railroad	Port Jervis Line	Port Jervis, NY	Erie Railroad		
Salisbury Mills–Cornwall	Metro-North Railroad	Port Jervis Line	Cornwall, NY	Erie Railroad	April 18, 1983	
Sloatsburg	Metro-North Railroad	Port Jervis Line	Sloatsburg, NY	Erie Railroad		
Spring Valley	Metro-North Railroad	Pascack Valley Line	Spring Valley, NY	Erie Railroad	June 30, 1841	
Tuxedo	Metro-North Railroad	Port Jervis Line	Tuxedo, NY	Erie Railroad		

== Proposed and future stations ==
Between 2008 and 2016, New Jersey Transit added four infill stations on existing lines. As of August 2020, one additional infill station is planned.

Several other lines are proposed for restoration. Parts of the Lackawanna Cut-Off Restoration Project in New Jersey have been implemented and there are proposals to extend the line west and into northeastern Pennsylvania. Restoration of service along the West Trenton Line between West Trenton (with connecting service to SEPTA's West Trenton Line) and Bridgewater where it would junction with the Raritan Valley Line (RVL) has been proposed, but not advanced. Extension of the Raritan Valley Line in connection with the Lehigh Line into Lehigh County, Pennsylvania has also been considered.

=== Infill stations ===
Station	Line	Location	Former railroad ROW	Opening	Notes
North Brunswick	Northeast Corridor Line	North Brunswick	Pennsylvania Railroad	TBA	County Yard is nearby and undergoing expansion

=== Proposed expansion stations ===
Station	Line	Location	Former railroad right-of-way	Opening	Notes
Analomink	Lackawanna Cut-Off	Analomink, PA	Lackawanna Railroad		Proposed
Andover	Lackawanna Cut-Off	Andover Township	Lackawanna Railroad	2026	Lackawanna Cut-Off Phase 1
Belle Mead	West Trenton Line	Belle Mead	Reading Railroad		Closed 1982, proposed restoration of service
Blairstown	Lackawanna Cut-Off	Blairstown	Lackawanna Railroad		Closed 1970, restoration of service
Delaware Water Gap	Lackawanna Cut-Off	Delaware Water Gap, PA	Lackawanna Railroad		Proposed to replace former Lackawanna Depot
East Stroudsburg	Lackawanna Cut-Off	East Stroudsburg, PA	Lackawanna Railroad		Closed 1970, proposed to replace relocated former station building
Hillsborough	West Trenton Line	Hillsborough Township	Reading Railroad		Proposed restoration of service
Hopewell	West Trenton Line	Hopewell	Reading Railroad		Closed 1982, proposed restoration of service
I-95 / Hopewell Township	West Trenton Line	Hopewell Township	Reading Railroad		Proposed
Pocono Mountain	Lackawanna Cut-Off	Mount Pocono, PA	Lackawanna Railroad		Proposed to replace 1908-built DL&W Depot
Scranton	Lackawanna Cut-Off	Scranton, PA	Lackawanna Railroad		Proposed to replace former Lackawanna Terminal
Bloomsbury–Bethlehem	Raritan Valley Line	Bethlehem Township	Central Railroad of New Jersey		Proposed Rail/Bus Park-and-Ride
West Trenton	West Trenton Line	Ewing Township	Reading Railroad		Proposed restoration of service

== Former stations ==
NJ Transit has closed numerous stations since its inception due to realignments in service or low ridership.

Station	Line	Location	Former railroad right-of-way	Opened	Closed	Notes
Ampere	Montclair Branch	East Orange	Lackawanna Railroad	April 24, 1893	April 7, 1991	Closed with Grove Street on April 7, 1991.
Arlington	Boonton Line	Kearny	Erie Railroad	January 1, 1873	September 20, 2002	Closed as part of service changes with the Montclair Connection.
Benson Street	Boonton Line	Glen Ridge	Erie Railroad	January 1, 1873	September 20, 2002	Closed as part of service changes with the Montclair Connection.
Fairmount Avenue	Pascack Valley Line	Hackensack	Erie Railroad			
Finderne	Raritan Valley Line	Manville	Central Railroad of New Jersey		October 29, 2006	
Glen Gardner	Raritan Valley Line	Glen Gardner	Central Railroad of New Jersey	July 2, 1852	January 1, 1984	Closed as part of the truncation of service back to High Bridge on January 1, 1984.
Grant Avenue	Raritan Valley Line	Plainfield	Central Railroad of New Jersey		April 26, 1986	
Great Notch	Montclair–Boonton Line	Little Falls	Erie Railroad	January 1, 1873	January 16, 2010	Closed on January 17, 2010 after years of poor ridership.
Grove Street	Morristown Line; Gladstone Branch	East Orange	Lackawanna Railroad		April 7, 1991	Closed with Ampere on April 7, 1991.
Hampton	Raritan Valley Line	Hampton	Central Railroad of New Jersey	July 2, 1852	January 1, 1984	Closed as part of the truncation of service back to High Bridge on January 1, 1984.
Harmon Cove	Bergen County Line; Pascack Valley Line	Secaucus	Erie Railroad	June 26, 1978	August 4, 2003	Closed on August 4, 2003 as part of a service reroute for Secaucus Junction.
Harrison	Morristown Line; Gladstone Branch; Montclair Branch	Harrison	Lackawanna Railroad		September 16, 1984	Harrison and Roseville Avenue stations closed on September 16, 1984.
Kingsland	Main Line	Lyndhurst	Lackawanna Railroad	December 14, 1870	June 8, 2025	Kingsland station closed after a new station was built at Lyndhurst.
New Milford	Pascack Valley Line	Oradell	Erie Railroad	March 4, 1870	October 1986	
North Newark	Boonton Line	Newark	Erie Railroad	January 1, 1873	April 26, 1986	Closed along with Grant Avenue on April 26, 1986.
North Rahway	Northeast Corridor Line; North Jersey Coast Line	Rahway	Pennsylvania Railroad	1872	January 31, 1993	
Phillipsburg	Raritan Valley Line	Hampton	Central Railroad of New Jersey	July 2, 1852	January 1, 1984	Closed as part of the truncation of service back to High Bridge on January 1, 1984.
Roseville Avenue	Morristown Line; Gladstone Branch; Montclair Branch	Newark	Lackawanna Railroad		September 16, 1984	Harrison and Roseville Avenue stations closed on September 16, 1984.
Rowe Street	Boonton Line	Bloomfield	Erie Railroad	1955	September 20, 2002	Closed as part of service changes with the Montclair Connection.
South Paterson	Main Line	Paterson	Erie Lackawanna Railway	April 2, 1963	October 1986	Closed due to low ridership.

== See also ==
- Timeline of Jersey City area railroads
- List of companies transferred to Conrail
- List of Metro-North Railroad stations
- List of Long Island Rail Road stations
- List of SEPTA Regional Rail stations
- List of United States commuter rail systems by ridership
- List of New Jersey railroad junctions

== Bibliography ==
- Baxter, Raymond J.; Adams, Arthur G. (1999). Railroad Ferries of the Hudson: And Stories of a Deckhand. Fordham, New York: Fordham University Press. ISBN 9780823219544.
- Catlin, George L. (1873). Homes on the Montclair Railway, for New York Business Men. A Description of the Country Adjacent to the Montclair Railway, Between Jersey City and Greenwood Lake. New York, New York: Montclair Railway Company.
- Douglass, A.M. (1912). The Railroad Trainman, Volume 29. Cleveland, Ohio: Brotherhood of Railroad Trainmen.
- Folsom, Joseph Fulford (1912). Bloomfield, Old and New: An Historical Symposium. Bloomfield, New Jersey: Centennial Historical Committee.
- Honeyman, Abraham Van Doren (1923). History of Union County, New Jersey 1664-1923 · Volume 1. New York, New York: Lewis Historical Publishing Company.
- Hungerford, Edward (1946). Men of Erie: A Story of Human Effort. New York, New York: Random House. OCLC 500324.
- Lucas, Walter Arndt (1944). From the Hills to the Hudson: A History of the Paterson and Hudson River Rail Road and its Associates, the Paterson and Ramapo, and the Union Railroads. New York, New York: The Cornwall Press. hdl:2027/uc1.b4536228.
- Lyon, Isaac S. (1873). Historical Discourse on Boonton, Delivered Before the Citizens of Boonton at Washington Hall, on the Evenings of September 21 and 28, and October 5, 1867. Newark, New Jersey: The Daily Journal Office.
- Mott, Edward Harold (1899). Between the Ocean and the Lakes: The Story of Erie. New York, New York: John S. Collins.
- New Jersey Comptroller of the Treasury (1856). Annual Statements of the Railroad and Canal Companies of the State of New Jersey. Trenton, New Jersey: Office of "True American".
- Order of Railway Conductors and Brakemen (1913). The Conductor and Brakeman, Volume 30. Cedar Rapids, Iowa: Order of Railway Conductors and Brakemen.
- Platt, Charles Davis (1922). Dover Dates, 1722-1922: A Bicentennial History of Dover, New Jersey, Published in Connection with Dover's Two Hundredth Anniversary Celebration Under the Direction of the Dover Fire Department, August 9, 10, 11, 1922. Dover, New Jersey: Charles Davis Platt.
- Poor, Henry Varnum (1884). Poor's Manual of Railroads. Pittsburgh, Pennsylvania: H.V. & H.W. Poor.
- Poor, Henry Varnum (1893). Poor's Manual of Railroads, Volume 26. New York, New York: American Bank Note Company.
- Shea, Raymond F. (2009). Brielle: From Saltworks to Suburb. Mount Pleasant, South Carolina: Arcadia Publishing. ISBN 9781614235255.
- Snell, James P. (1881). History of Hunterdon and Somerset Counties, New Jersey: With Illustrations and Biographical Sketches of Its Prominent Men and Pioneers. Everts and Peck.
- Stern, Robert A.M.; Fishman, David; Tilove, Jacob (2013). Paradise Planned: The Garden Suburb and the Modern City. New York, New York: The Monacelli Press. ISBN 9781580933261.
- United States Congress (1884). The Executive Documents of the House of Representatives for the First Session of the Forty-Eighth Congress, 1883-'84. Washington D.C.: Government Printing Office.
- Wainwright, Halsted H. (1922). History of Monmouth County, New Jersey, 1664-1920 Volume 2. New York, New York: The Lewis Historical Publishing Company.
- Wall, John Patrick (1921). History of Middlesex County, New Jersey, 1664-1920, Volume 1. New York, New York: The Lewis Historical Publishing Company.
- Whittemore, Henry (1894). History of Montclair Township, State of New Jersey: Including the History of Families who Have Been Identified with Its Growth and Prosperity. New York, New York: The Suburban Publishing Company.
