= Far Hills station =

NJ Transit rail station

Far Hills
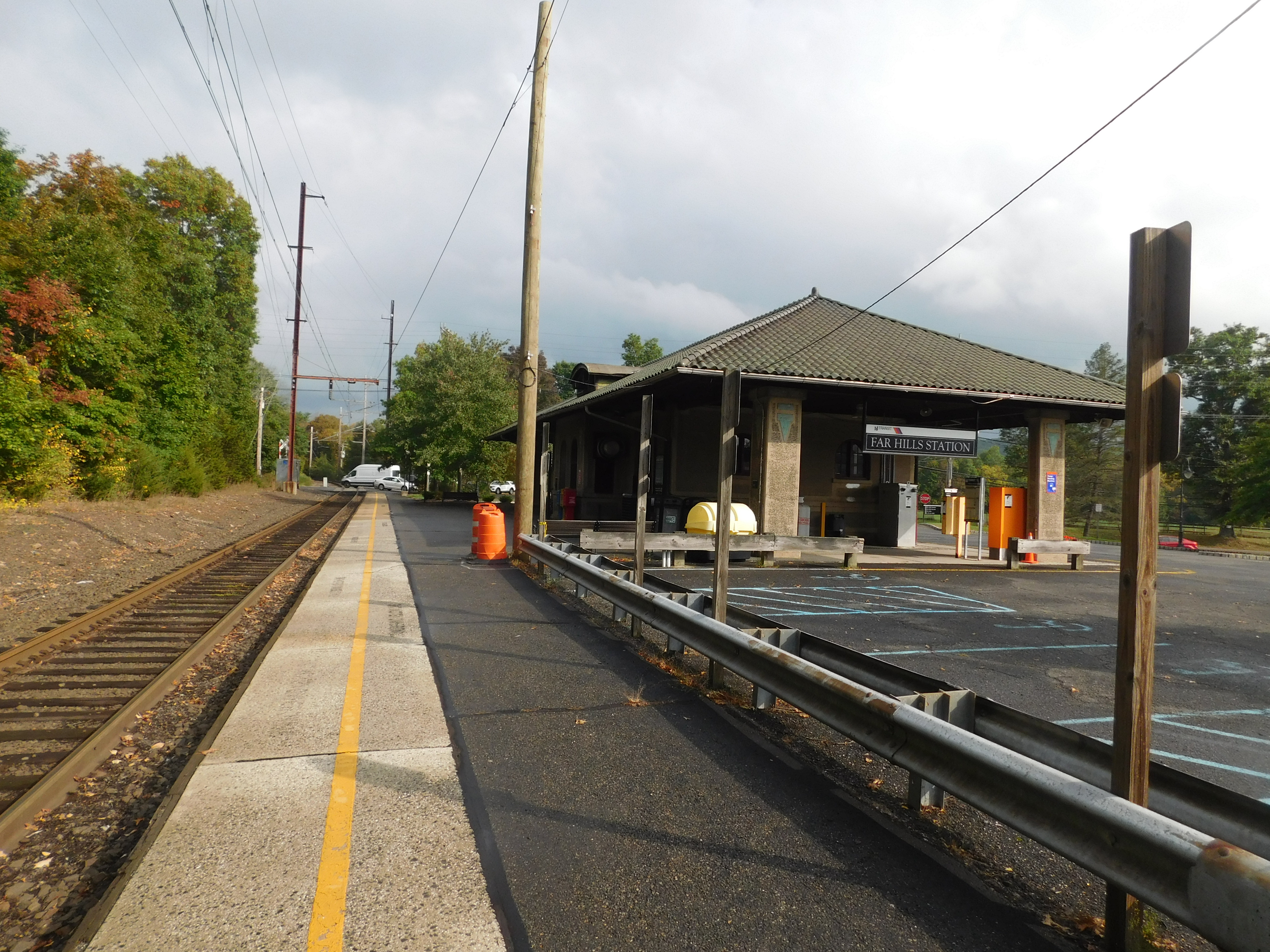
- Far Hills station in September 2020.

General information
- Location: 57 Route 202 (at junction with CR 512); Far Hills, New Jersey 07931
- Owner: NJ Transit
- Platforms: 1 side platform
- Tracks: 1
- Connections: Lakeland: 78

Construction
- Parking: Yes

Other information
- Station code: 719 (Delaware, Lackawanna and Western)
- Fare zone: 17

History
- Opened: October 10, 1890
- Rebuilt: June 2–December 20, 1914
- Electrified: January 6, 1931

Key dates
- July 1, 1981: Station agency closed

Passengers
- 2025: 75 (average weekday)
- Rank: 128 of 153

Services
Preceding station	NJ Transit	Following station
Peapack toward Gladstone	Gladstone Branch	Bernardsville toward New York or Hoboken
Former services
Preceding station	Delaware, Lackawanna and Western Railroad	Following station
Peapack toward Gladstone	Gladstone Branch	Mine Brook toward Hoboken
- Far Hills Station
- U.S. National Register of Historic Places
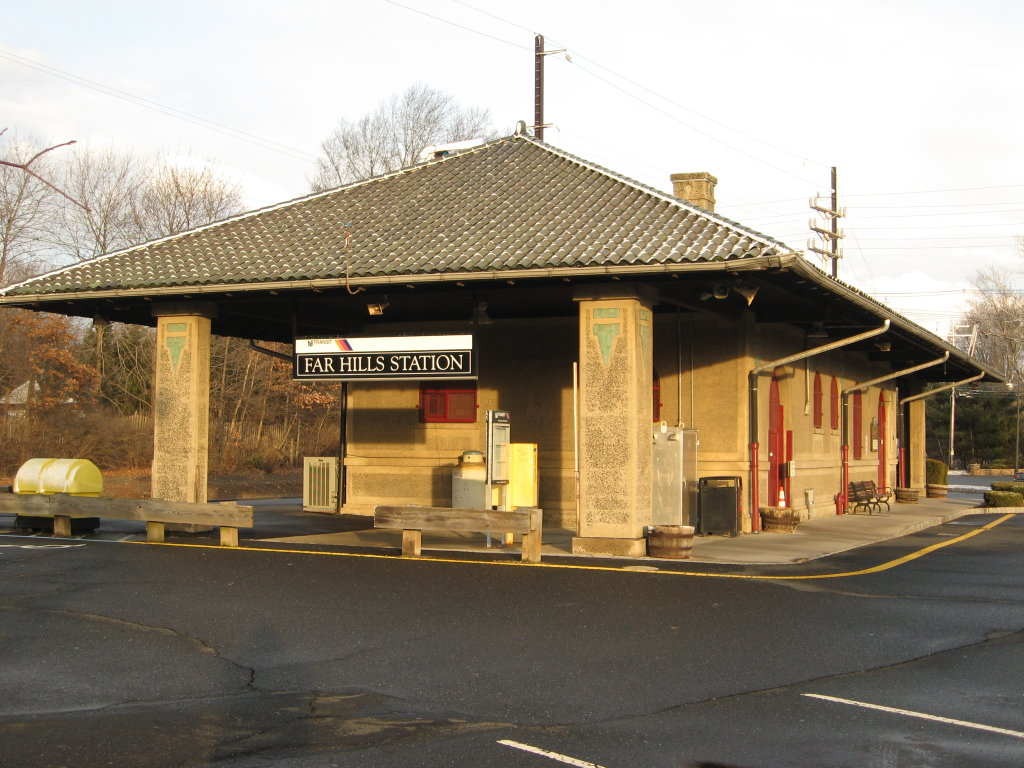
- The 1914 station depot of the Delaware, Lackawanna and Western Railroad at Far Hills.
- Location: Far Hills, New Jersey
- Coordinates: 40°41′8″N 74°38′3″W
- Area: 0.8 acres (0.3 ha)
- Built: 1914
- Architect: Simpson, L.R.
- Architectural style: Renaissance
- MPS: Operating Passenger Railroad Stations TR
- NRHP reference No.: 84002789
- Added to NRHP: June 22, 1984
Location

Far Hills is a NJ Transit station in Far Hills, in Somerset County, New Jersey, United States located at the intersection of Route 202 and CR 512, one-half mile (0.80 km) east of Route 206.

== History ==
The Spanish Revival-style station was built in 1914 and also includes an old freight station to the west in a similar design. The head house has been on the state and federal registers of historic places since 1984, listed as part of the Operating Passenger Railroad Stations Thematic Resource.

== Station layout ==
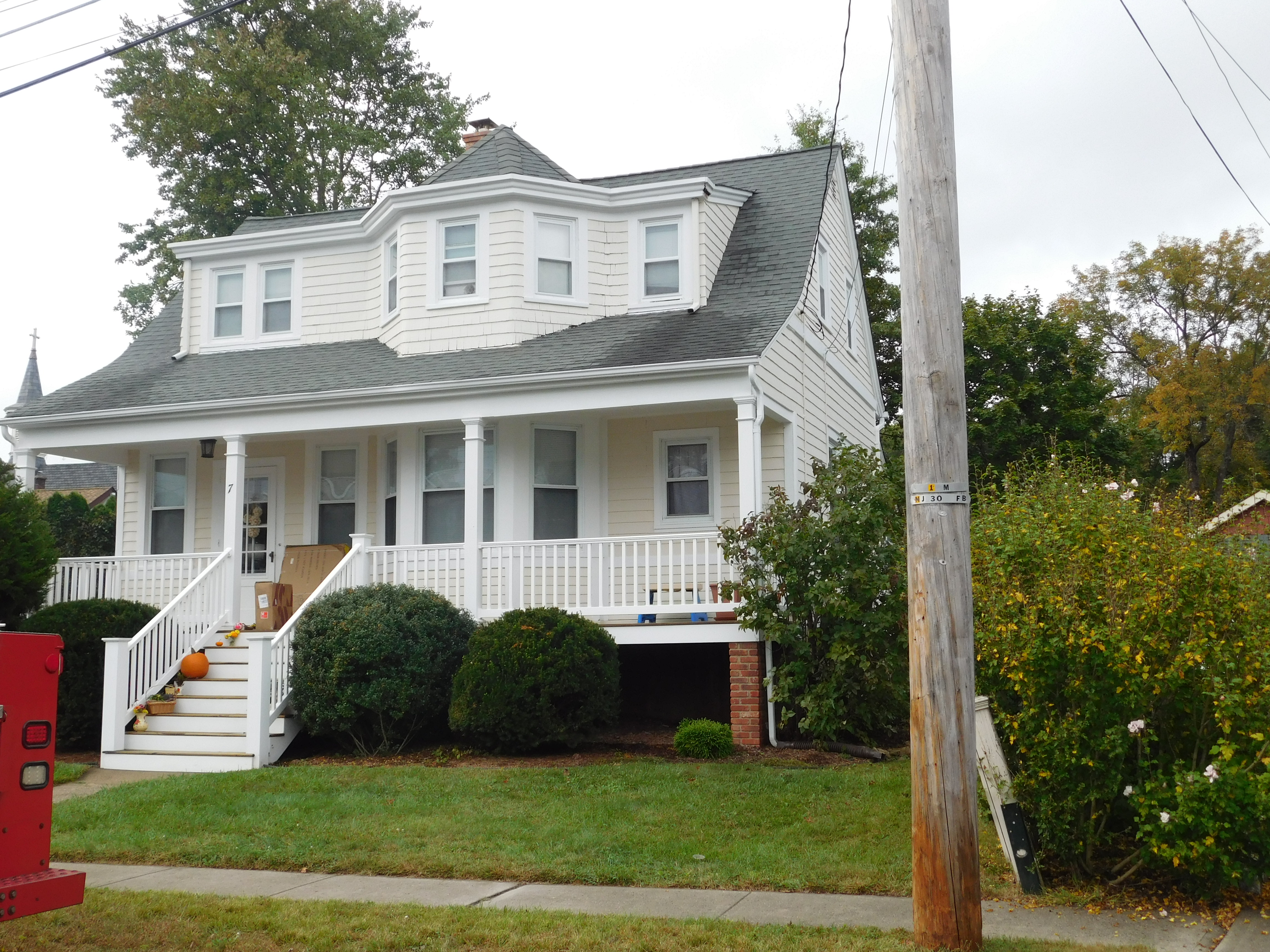
The former depot at Far Hills, repurposed into a house on nearby Spring Street

In addition to the building with ticket office and waiting room, permitted parking is available, along with bicycle racks along the station house wall. There is one low-level concrete side platform. Near the station, there is a passing siding to allow east and westbound trains to get past each other.

The Far Hills station has a restaurant called Butler's Pantry and is part of the NJ Transit Gladstone Branch, offering service to Hoboken Terminal, and to Penn Station in Midtown Manhattan via the Kearny Connection. The station is also known as Far Hills–Bedminster because of its proximity to the town. During an earlier era, most riders would get off at the Far Hills station for the horse races at the Far Hills Steeplechase Farm.

== See also ==
- List of New Jersey Transit stations
- National Register of Historic Places listings in Somerset County, New Jersey
