= Lyons station =

NJ Transit rail station

Lyons
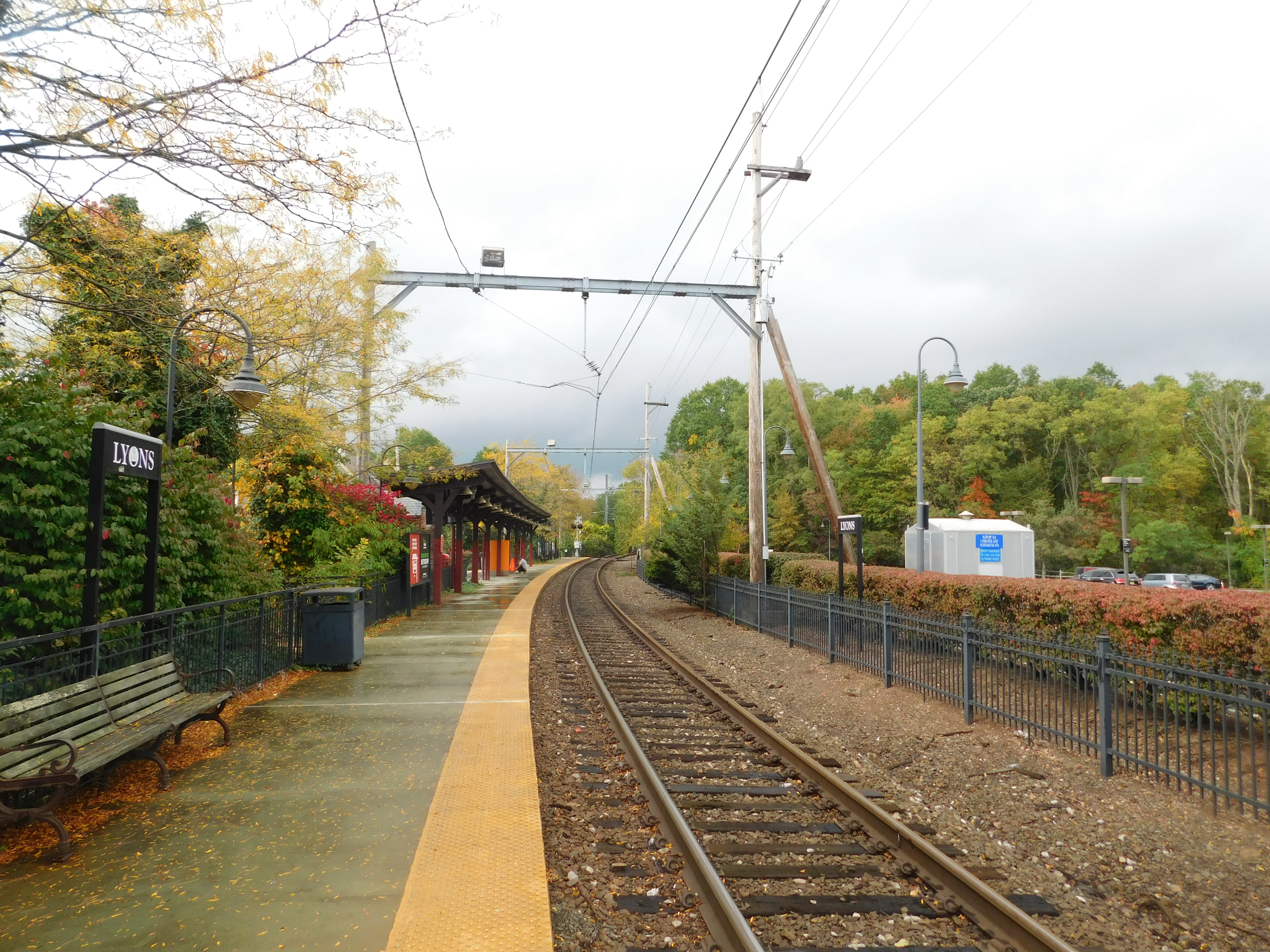
- The station at Lyons in September 2020. The station depot, built by the Delaware, Lackawanna and Western Railroad, is seen behind the canopy.

General information
- Location: 4 Lyons Road, Basking Ridge, New Jersey 07059
- Owner: New Jersey Transit
- Platforms: 1 side platform
- Tracks: 1
- Connections: Lakeland: 78

Construction
- Accessible: yes

Other information
- Station code: 712 (Delaware, Lackawanna and Western)
- Fare zone: 14

History
- Opened: January 29, 1872
- Rebuilt: December 15, 1930–1931
- Electrified: January 6, 1931

Key dates
- October 23, 1918: Station shelter burned

Passengers
- 2025: 223 (average weekday)
- Rank: 98 of 153

Services
Preceding station	NJ Transit	Following station
Basking Ridge toward Gladstone	Gladstone Branch	Millington toward New York or Hoboken
Former services
Preceding station	Delaware, Lackawanna and Western Railroad	Following station
Basking Ridge toward Gladstone	Gladstone Branch	Millington toward Hoboken
- Lyons Station
- U.S. National Register of Historic Places
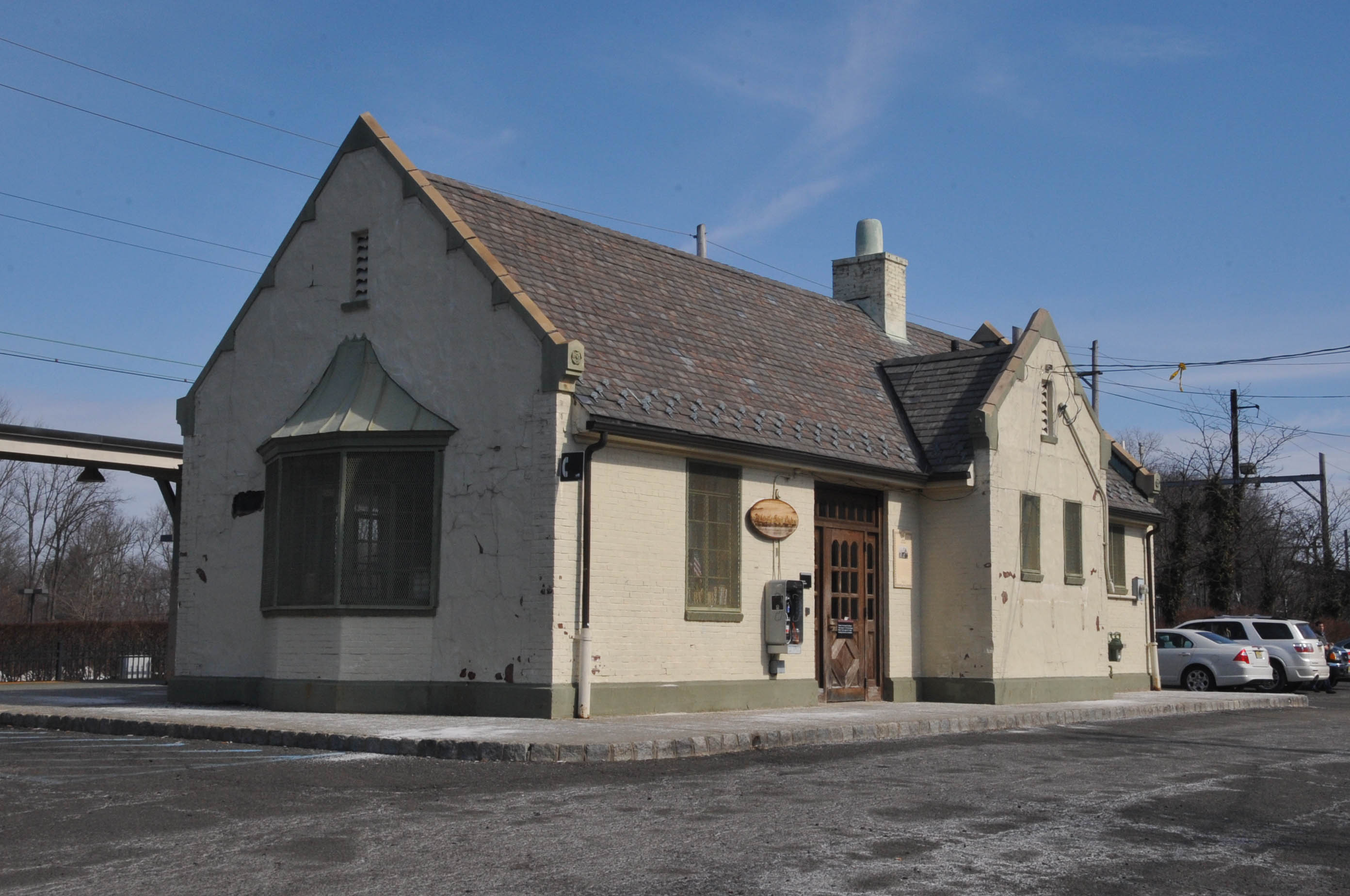
- Coordinates: 40°41′5.2″N 74°32′58.3″W
- Area: 0.2 acres (0.081 ha)
- Built: 1931
- Architect: D.T. Mack
- Architectural style: Tudor Revival, Mission Revival/Spanish Revival
- MPS: Operating Passenger Railroad Stations TR
- NRHP reference No.: 84002805
- Added to NRHP: June 22, 1984
Location

Lyons is a New Jersey Transit station in Basking Ridge, New Jersey along the Gladstone Branch of the Morris & Essex Lines. The station serves south Basking Ridge as well as the Hills and Liberty Corner.

== History ==
Lyons station was originally built in 1931 by Delaware, Lackawanna and Western Railroad to coincide with electrification and to serve the Lyons VA Medical Center, which opened in 1930. It was the last station built by the Delaware, Lackawanna, and Western Railroad in New Jersey and the second-to-last station depot built overall by the DL&W, behind the station at Syracuse, New York in 1941. The single station building, on the north side of the single track, is a Tudor Revival and Mission Revival style structure. Designed by Delaware Lackawanna and Western Railroad architect D.T. Mack or one of his staff, it is of brick and stucco construction and has limestone trim with carved rosette ornamentation at the gable ends. The station depot also features freight doors on the right side. A brass ornamental arch stands on the westernmost part of the platform. The station building was listed in the New Jersey Register of Historic Places on March 17, 1984, and in National Register of Historic Places on June 22, 1984, as part of the Operating Passenger Railroad Stations Thematic Resource.

In 2014, Bernards Township applied for a grant to repoint, and perform structural repairs on the station building. A $103,000 grant to the township came to help fund those improvements. In November 2015, it was announced that Bernards Township was awarded a second grant of $96,580 through the Somerset County Historic Preservation Commission to restore the station depot and canopy. In January 2016, restoration work began on the station canopy. On December 29, 2015, the firm Daniel W. Lincoln of Bernardsville was awarded the $11,350 contract for design/construction services of the canopy at a committee meeting. Restoration work began in January 2016. In late 2017, restoration work began on the station depot, as the cream paint on the outer facade was removed and the facade was restored to display the original brick and stucco underneath. In June 2018, the station depot received a new coating of stucco.

== Station layout ==
The station has one side platform, which is mostly low-level except for a mini-high platform and ramp for disabled passengers on the eastern end. This makes Lyons one of the only stations along the Gladstone Branch that is handicap-accessible. The station building is open on weekdays only from 5:05 AM to 1:05 PM with a break from 9:50 AM to 10:20 AM. Two Ticket Vending Machines (TVM) and bicycle racks are located next to the station building. To the left of the building is a small outdoor waiting area with benches. There is a railroad crossing on either end of the station allowing access to the far parking lot. Bicycle racks are located right outside the station depot. The 95-space parking lot on the platform side is owned by the municipality for permit parking, while the 236-space far parking lot owned by Park America is used for both daily and permit parking.

== See also ==
- List of New Jersey Transit stations
