= North Elizabeth station =

NJ Transit rail station

North Elizabeth
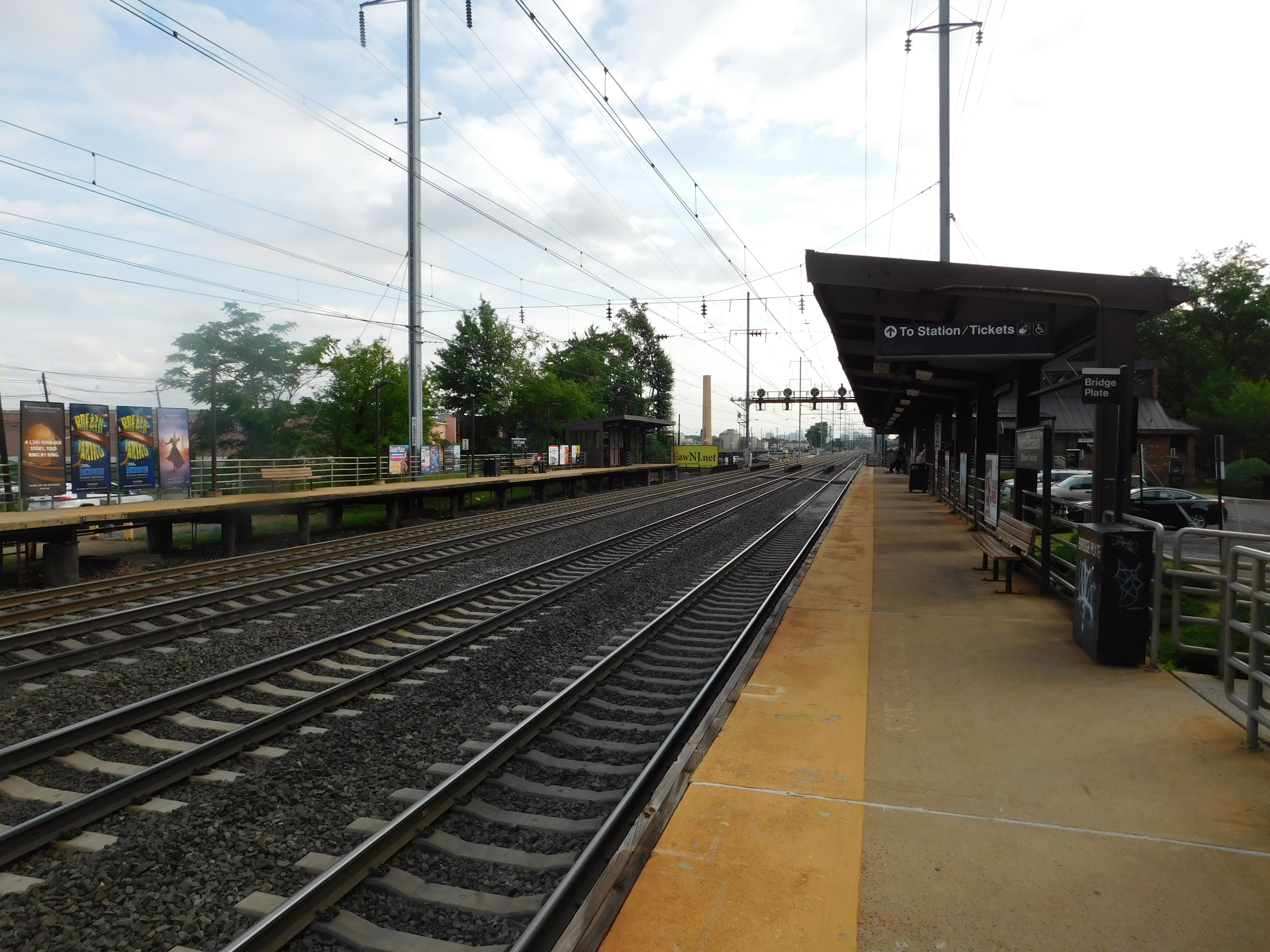
- North Elizabeth station looking north

General information
- Location: 1180 North Avenue; Elizabeth, New Jersey
- Coordinates: 40°40′48″N 74°12′23″W
- Owner: New Jersey Transit
- Line: Amtrak Northeast Corridor
- Platforms: 2 side platforms
- Tracks: 4

Construction
- Cycle facilities: Yes
- Accessible: Yes

Other information
- Fare zone: 5

History
- Rebuilt: –Fall 1986
- Electrified: December 8, 1932

Key dates
- February 18, 1892: Station depot burns

Passengers
- 2025: 730 (average weekday)
- Rank: 39 of 153

Services
Preceding station	NJ Transit	Following station
Elizabeth toward Trenton	Northeast Corridor Line	Newark Airport toward New York
Elizabeth toward Bay Head	North Jersey Coast Line	Newark Airport toward New York
Former services
Preceding station	Pennsylvania Railroad	Following station
Elizabeth toward New Brunswick	New Brunswick Line	Waverly toward New York or Exchange Place
Location

North Elizabeth station is a commuter railroad station in the city of Elizabeth, Union County, New Jersey, United States. Located at the North Avenue bridge crossing in Elizabeth, the station serves trains of NJ Transit's Northeast Corridor and North Jersey Coast Lines. North Elizabeth station features two high-level platforms for handicap accessibility under the Americans with Disabilities Act of 1990.

Service at this station is limited. As of November 8, 2020, there were 14 eastbound trains and 13 westbound trains serving the station on weekends.

== History ==
While the work finished in the fall of 1986, NJ Transit and Elizabeth officials held an official grand opening of rebuilt North Elizabeth station (along with Linden and Edison stations) on February 4, 1987. Jerome Premo, the executive director of NJ Transit announced that the upgrades were important for "providing quality transportation.

== Station layout ==
This station has two side platforms and four tracks. Each platform has a staircase at their northern ends going down to North Avenue, which crosses under the tracks, and another at their southern ends going up Hand Place, which crosses above the tracks. The station house and small parking lot are at the North Avenue end on the New York-bound platform. A larger parking lot is adjacent to the southbound platform.
