= Peapack station =

NJ Transit rail station

Coordinates: 40°42′31.5″N 74°39′30.3″W

Peapack
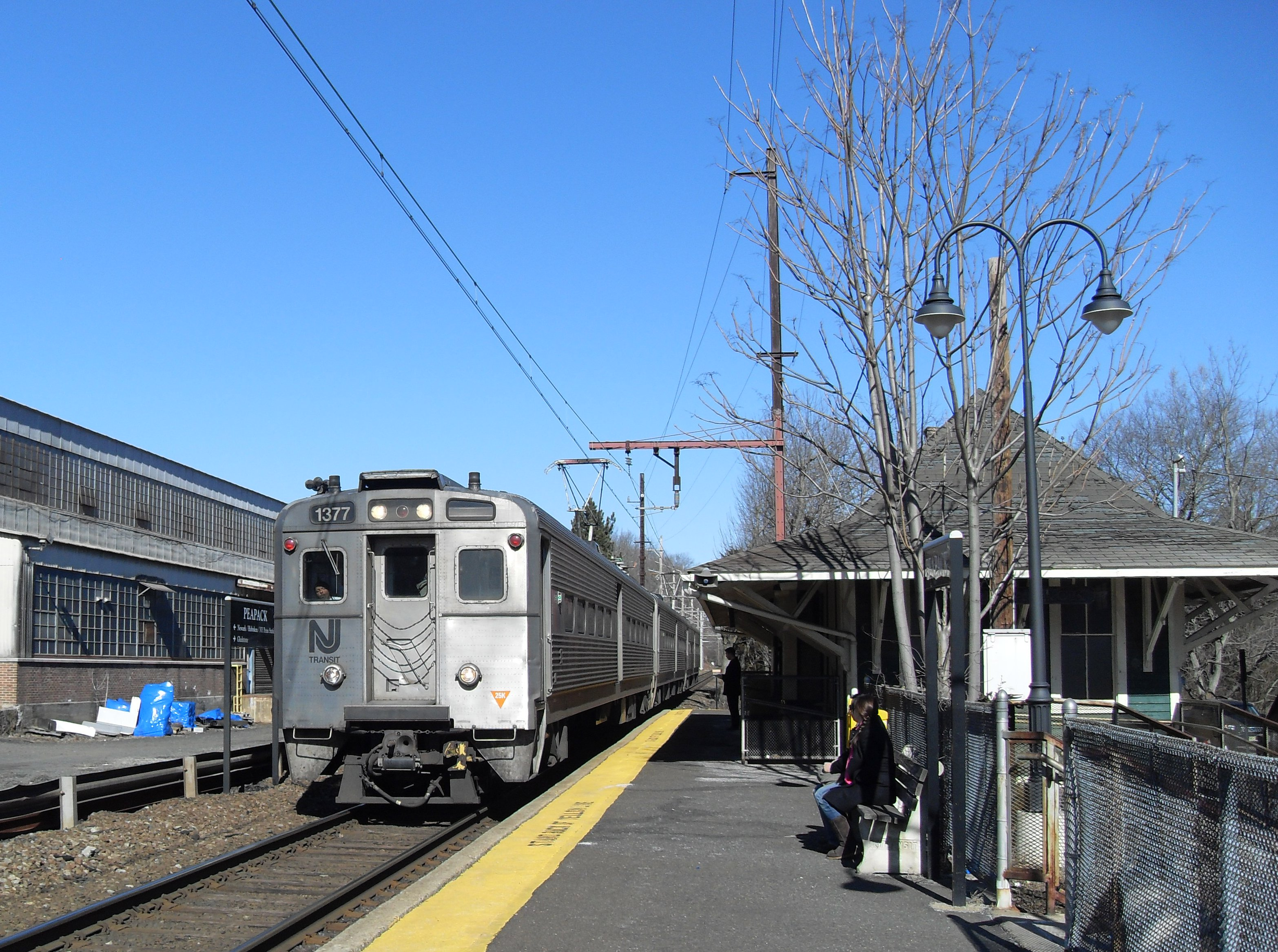

General information
- Location: 10 Holland Avenue (CR 661), Peapack-Gladstone, New Jersey 07977
- Owner: New Jersey Transit
- Platforms: 1 side platform
- Tracks: 1

Other information
- Station code: 721 (Delaware, Lackawanna and Western)
- Fare zone: 18

History
- Opened: October 10, 1890
- Electrified: January 6, 1931

Passengers
- 2025: 26 (average weekday)
- Rank: 149 of 153

Services
Preceding station	NJ Transit	Following station
Gladstone Terminus	Gladstone Branch	Far Hills toward New York or Hoboken
Former services
Preceding station	Delaware, Lackawanna and Western Railroad	Following station
Gladstone Terminus	Gladstone Branch	Far Hills–Bedminster toward Hoboken
Location

Peapack is an active commuter railroad train station in the borough of Peapack–Gladstone, Somerset County, New Jersey. Located on Holland Avenue (County Route 661) in the Peapack section of the municipality, the station serves trains of New Jersey Transit's Gladstone Branch.

Service in Peapack began on October 10, 1890 when trains started operating New Jersey West Line Railroad west from Bernardsville to Gladstone.

== Station layout ==
The station has one track and one low-level asphalt side platform. It is located just off of Holland Avenue in the Peapack section of Peapack-Gladstone, New_Jersey with a gravel parking lot. The parking lot is maintained by NJ Transit. The station is not compliant with the Americans with Disabilities Act of 1990.
