= Basking Ridge station =

NJ Transit rail station

Coordinates: 40°42′41″N 74°33′19″W

Basking Ridge
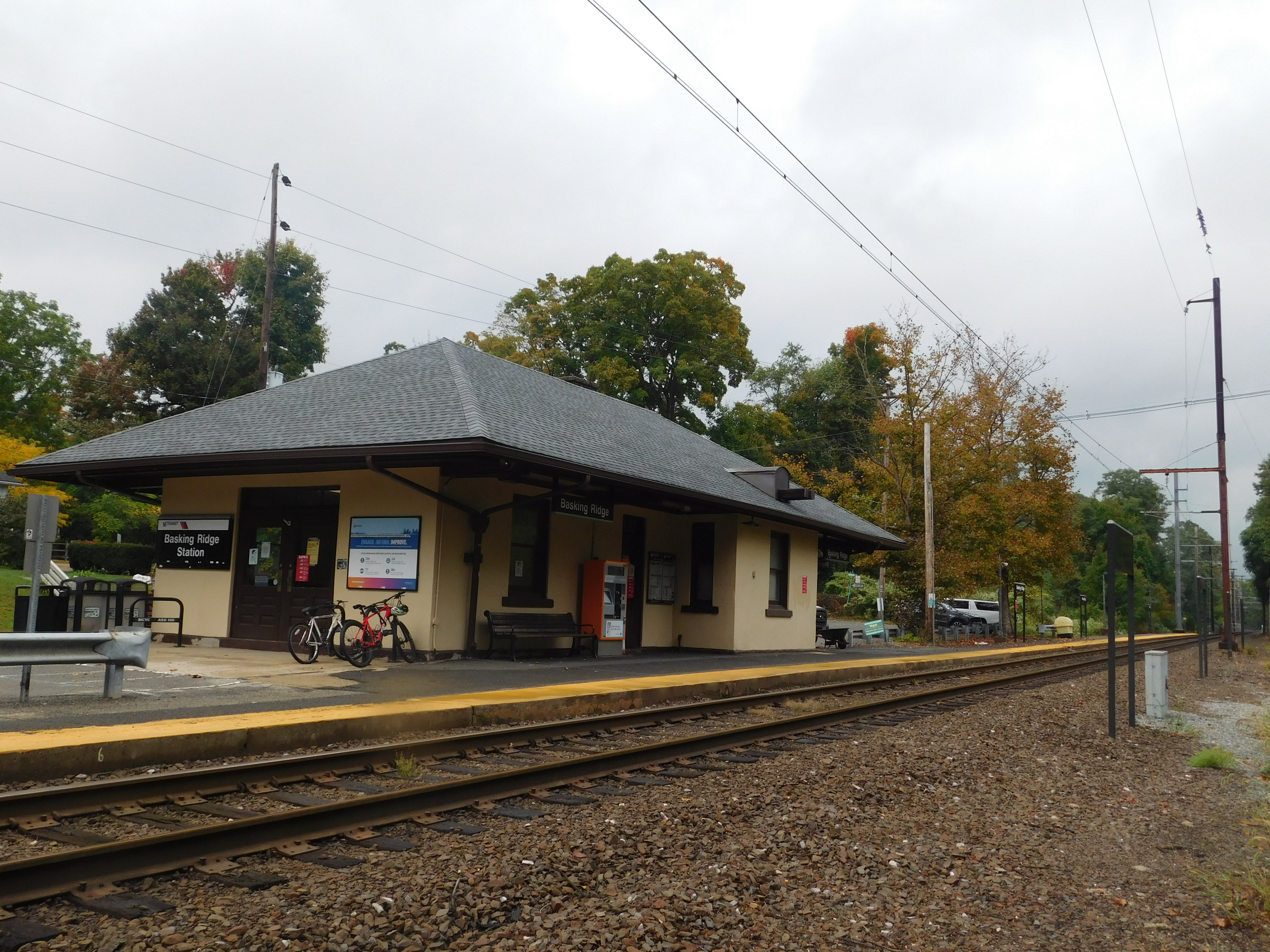
- Basking Ridge station in September 2020. The station's former semaphore signal has been removed from the building's canopy over the platform.

General information
- Location: Ridge Street and Depot Place, Basking Ridge, New Jersey
- Owner: New Jersey Transit
- Platforms: 1 side platform
- Tracks: 1
- Connections: Lakeland Bus Lines: 78

Construction
- Accessible: No

Other information
- Station code: 714 (Delaware, Lackawanna and Western)
- Fare zone: 16

History
- Opened: January 29, 1872
- Rebuilt: 1911
- Electrified: January 6, 1931

Key dates
- April 4, 1911: Station depot burns
- July 1, 1981: Station agency closed

Passengers
- 2025: 59 (average weekday)
- Rank: 135 of 153

Services
| Preceding station | NJ Transit | Following station |
|---|---|---|
| Bernardsville toward Gladstone | Gladstone Branch | Lyons toward New York or Hoboken |
Former services
| Preceding station | Delaware, Lackawanna and Western Railroad | Following station |
|---|---|---|
| Bernardsville toward Gladstone | Gladstone Branch | Lyons toward Hoboken |
Location

Basking Ridge is an NJ Transit station in Bernards Township, New Jersey along the Gladstone Branch of the Morris and Essex Lines.

== History ==
The station opened on January 29, 1872. The station building was constructed in 1912 by the Delaware, Lackawanna and Western Railroad, after the previous station depot had burnt down on April 4, 1911. The station agency closed on July 1, 1981.

== Station layout ==
The station has one track and a single low-level side platform. The station has a station building located on the north side of the track. Permitted parking is available at the station.

== Gallery ==
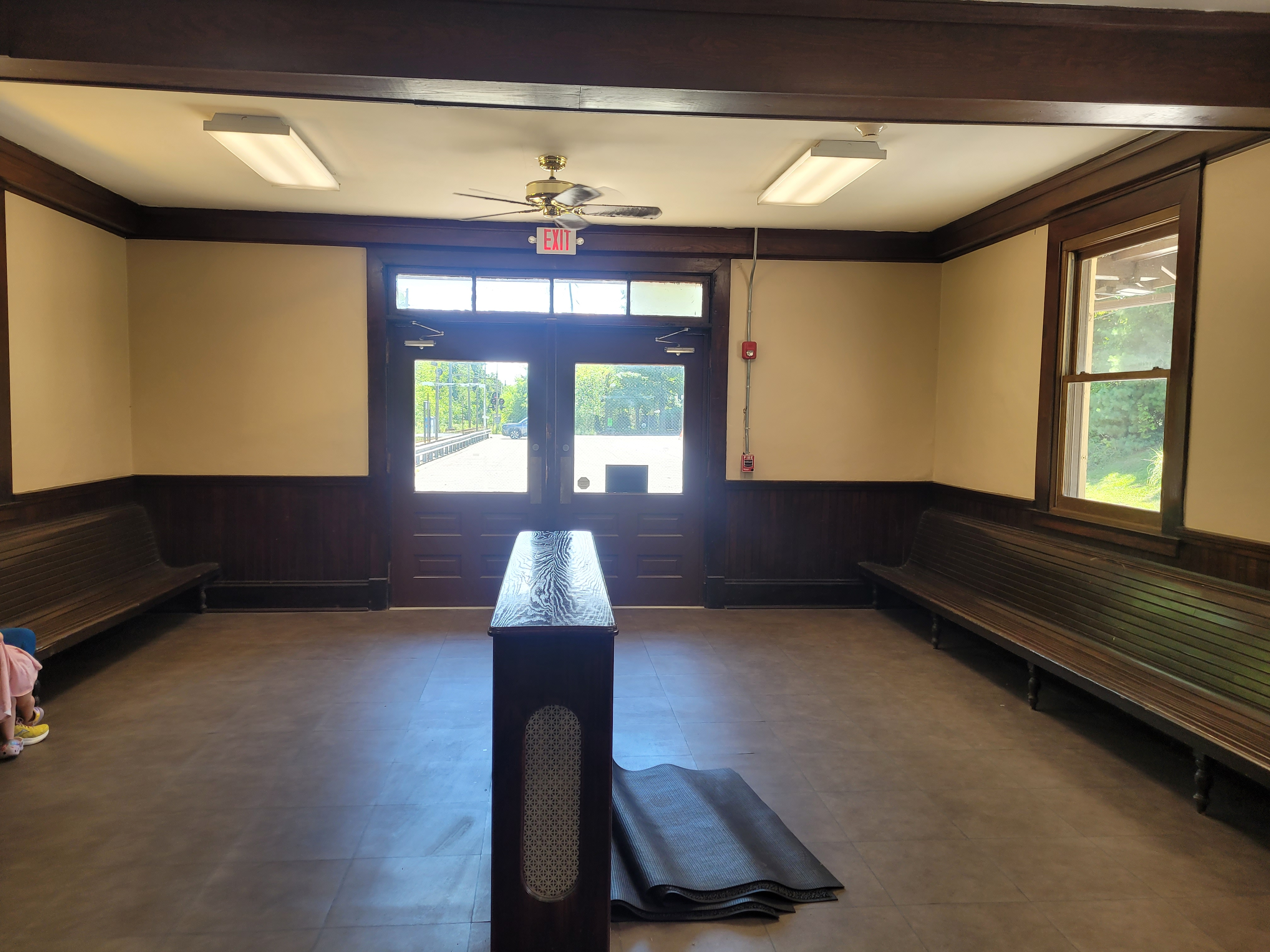
Interior of the station, September 2024

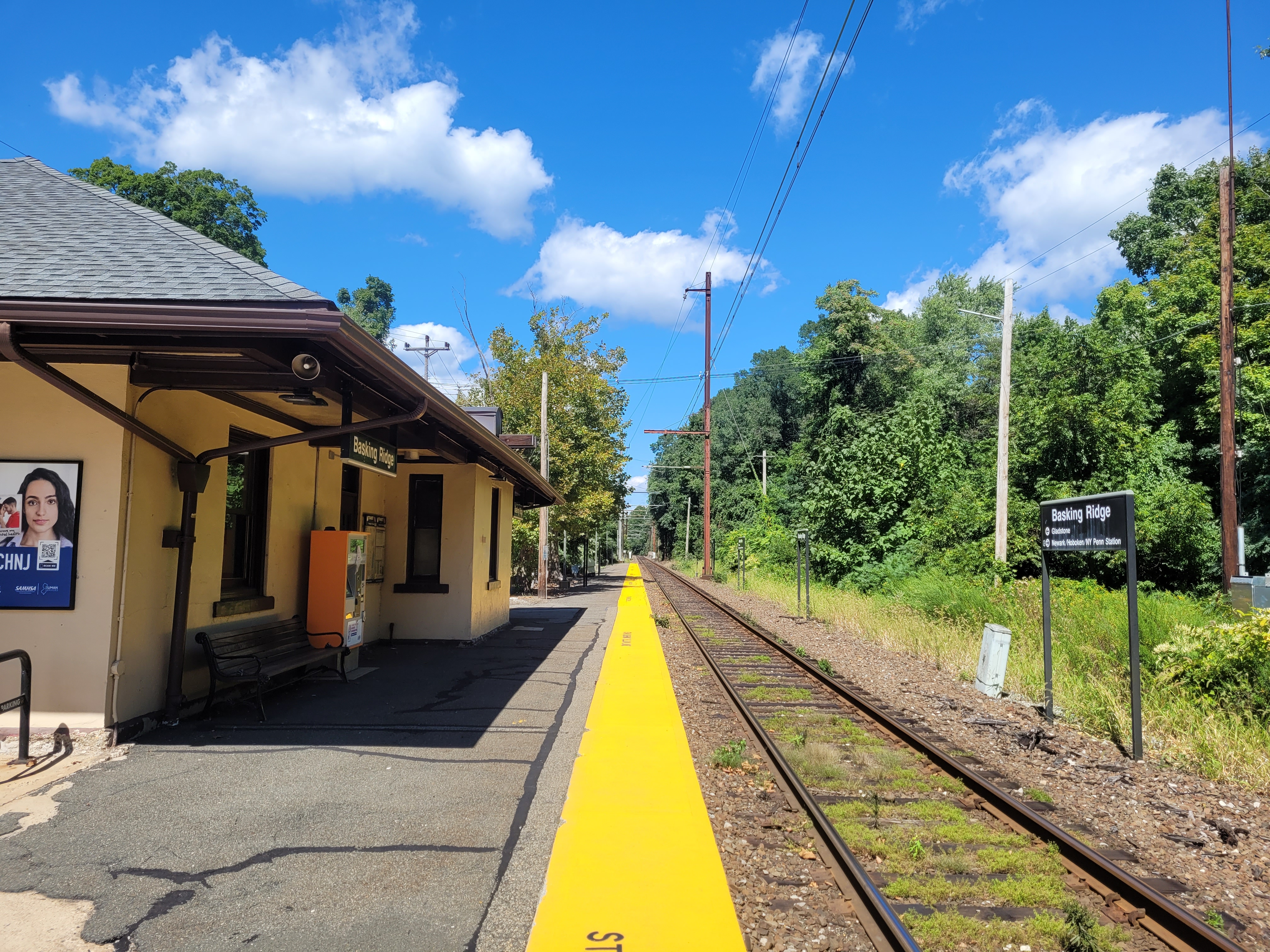
View down the tracks, September 2024

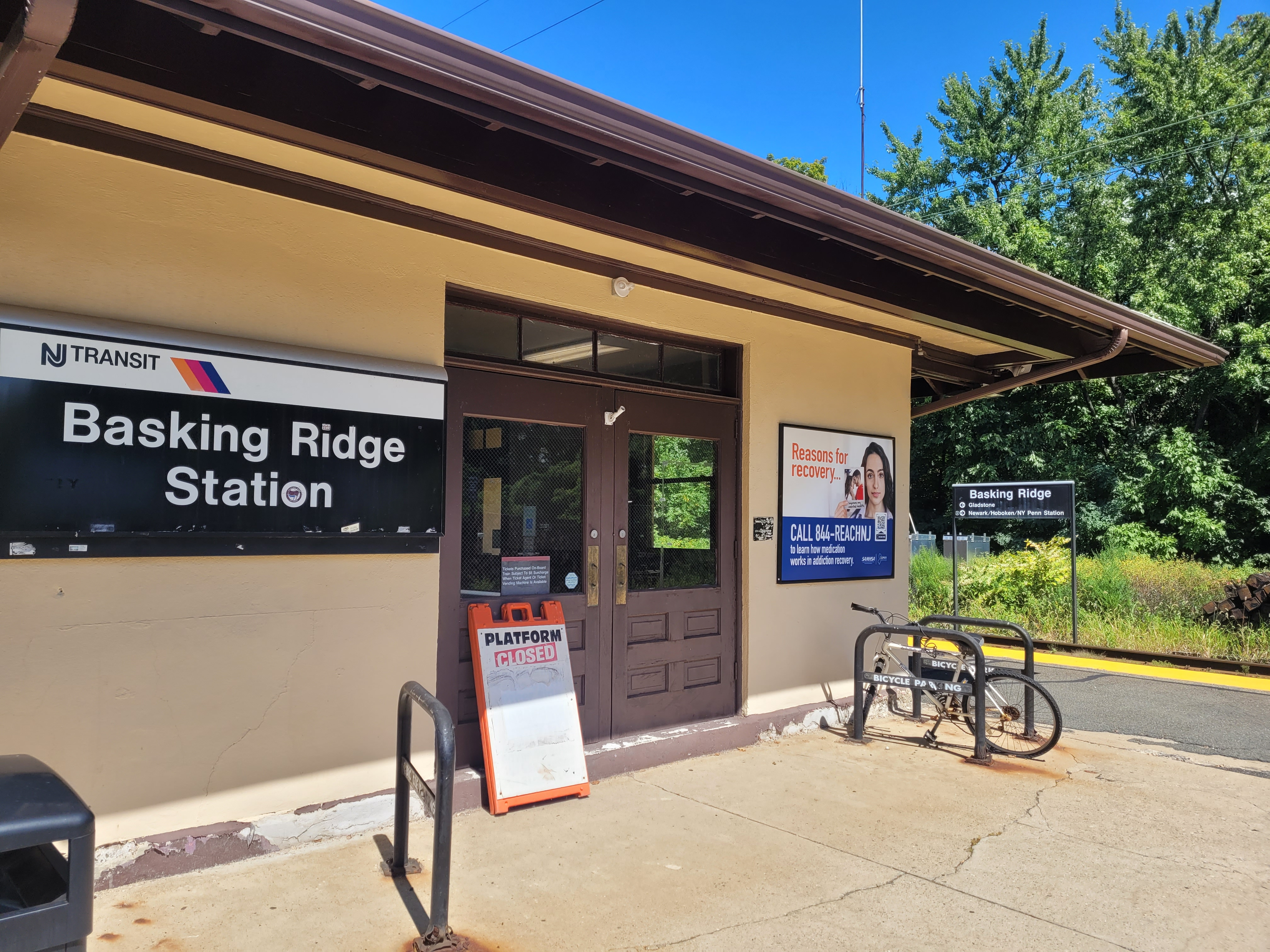
Side of the station, September 2024
