= Elizabeth station (NJ Transit) =

NJ Transit rail station

Elizabeth
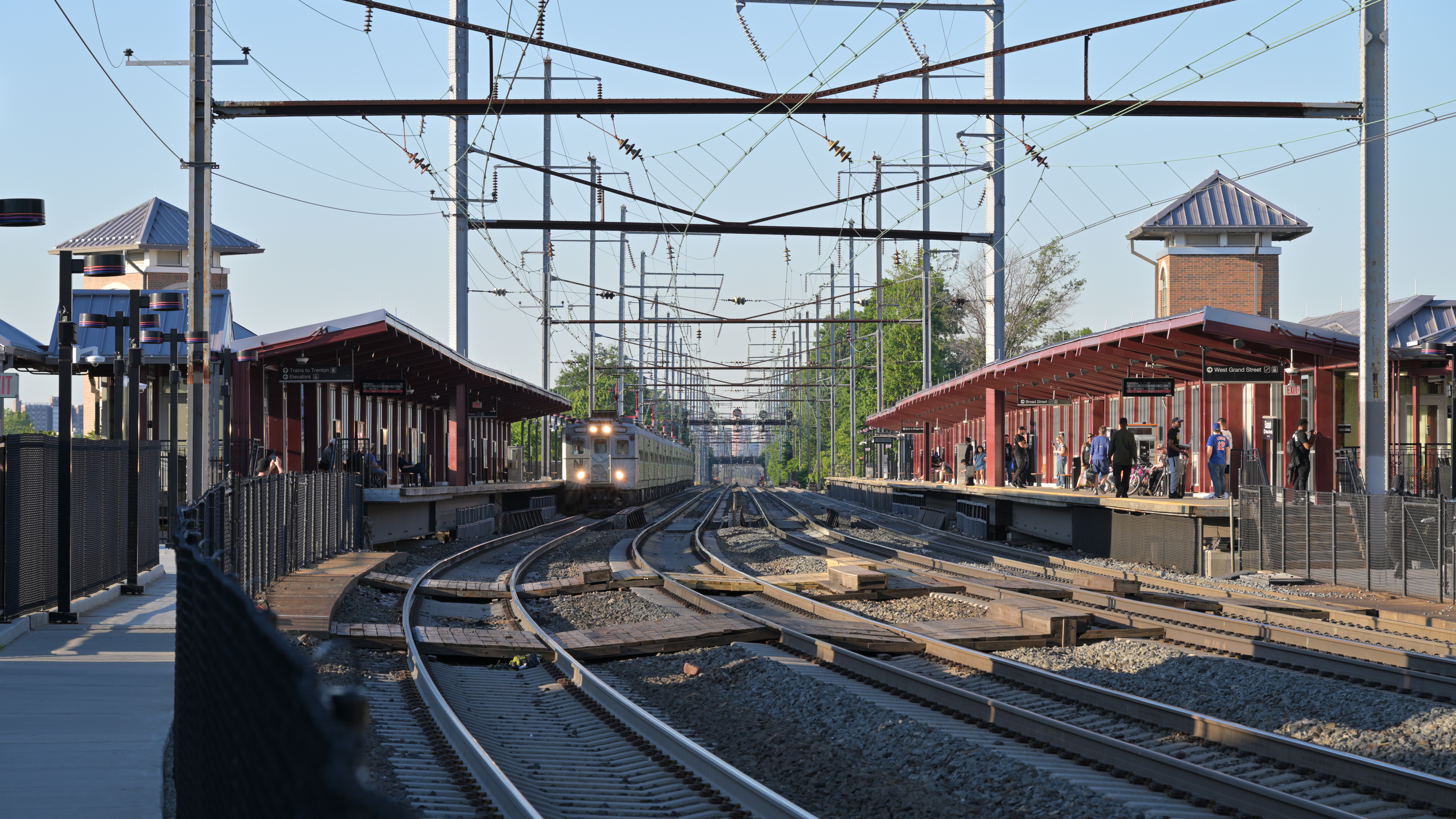
- Elizabeth station in 2026

General information
- Location: 11 West Grand Street; Elizabeth, New Jersey
- Coordinates: 40.6668°N 74.2158°W
- Owner: New Jersey Transit
- Line: Amtrak Northeast Corridor
- Platforms: 2 side platforms
- Tracks: 4
- Connections: NJ Transit Bus: 24, 26, 48, 52, 56, 57, 58, 59, 62, 112

Construction
- Parking: Yes
- Cycle facilities: Racks, lockers
- Accessible: Yes

Other information
- Fare zone: 5

History
- Opened: December 3, 1835 (inaugural train); December 21, 1835 (regular passenger service)
- Rebuilt: September 2019–June 18, 2024
- Electrified: December 8, 1932

Key dates
- May 1971: Station depot caught fire
- October 26, 1975: Amtrak service discontinued

Passengers
- 2025: 3,135 (average weekday)
- Rank: 10 of 153

Services
Preceding station	NJ Transit	Following station
Linden toward Trenton	Northeast Corridor Line	North Elizabeth toward New York
Linden toward Bay Head	North Jersey Coast Line	North Elizabeth toward New York
Former services
Preceding station	Pennsylvania Railroad	Following station
Linden toward Chicago	Main Line	Newark South Street toward New York or Exchange Place
South Elizabeth toward New Brunswick	New Brunswick Line	North Elizabeth toward New York or Exchange Place
Location

Elizabeth (often called Broad Street–Elizabeth to differentiate it from North Elizabeth station) is a commuter railroad station on the Northeast Corridor in the city of Elizabeth, Union County, New Jersey. Located between Broad Street and West Grand Street in the Midtown district of Elizabeth, the station serves trains of NJ Transit's Northeast Corridor Line and North Jersey Coast Line. Amtrak's services bypass the station on the express tracks. Elizabeth station contains two high-level side platforms separated by four tracks. The station also serves as a local intermodal transit hub. The former Central Railroad of New Jersey depot sits in the complex next to the station.

== History ==
Train service in Elizabeth, then a borough, began with the opening of the New Jersey Rail Road and Transportation Company, a predecessor of the Pennsylvania Railroad on December 21, 1835. The station served as a temporary terminus until January 1, 1836 when it was extended to Rahway.

On February 13, 1887, the President of the Pennsylvania Railroad, George Brooke Roberts, announced that the railroad would start installing two new tracks (a third and fourth) near Monmouth Junction. This 16-mile (26 km) of rail project would facilitate another section of four tracks between Jersey City and Trenton, leaving just a section through Elizabeth in New Jersey without four tracks. The third track between Millstone Junction in New Brunswick and Monmouth Junction opened in June 1888.

The grade crossings through Elizabeth had proven to be problematic for the city of Elizabeth and on March 12, 1889, the city Board of Trade passed a resolution to demand the city council work on eliminating the crossings. This would be by appointing a local engineer to talk with the Pennsylvania Railroad and Central Railroad of New Jersey to create the plans for it. The City Council in May 1889 got a request by the Pennsylvania Railroad to eliminate the grade crossing of Railroad Avenue. However, on May 20, the Council rejected that proposal on the condition that the railroad put forward effort to eliminate all grade crossings in the city. By August 5, the City Council had discussed grade crossing elimination through the city with the Pennsylvania Railroad. The Pennsylvania Railroad stated that as soon as a fourth track was built between Elizabeth and Newark, the railroad would build a new station in Elizabeth to complement the city. The city met with the Central Railroad of New Jersey on August 8 to work on eliminating their crossings. The Pennsylvania began construction of its third and fourth track in Elizabeth on August 10.

In 1968, the station became part of Penn Central Railroad. On June 9, 1968, the funeral train of Robert F. Kennedy heading south to Washington, DC passed through the station, where crowds lined the tracks to bid farewell and pay tribute. Prior to its passing, two persons were killed and 5 injured after being struck by a northbound Penn Central train that had originated in Chicago. They were unable to get off the track in time, though the New York-bound train's engineer had slowed to 30 miles per hour (48 km/h) for the normally 55-mile-per-hour (89 km/h) curve, blown his horn continuously, and rung his bell through the curve.

The station depot, built by the Pennsylvania Railroad, caught fire in May 1971 and was replaced by Penn Central. Amtrak serviced Elizabeth station from its inception on May 1, 1971 until October 26, 1975.

The connection to the former Central Railroad of New Jersey station ended with the discontinuance of the Bayonne Scoot by Conrail on August 6, 1978, ending a connection that had existed since January 1, 1839.

In January 2015 it was announced that a new station house, platforms, and stairways would be built, a project estimated to cost $55 million (2015 USD). The design was made in coordination with Amtrak (which owns the NEC but ended Elizabeth stops about 1973) which plans to add a fifth track. Funding was approved in 2018, and includes the creation of a transit plaza between the two stations. As part of the project, the platforms are being extended to accommodate 12-car trains. Construction began in 2019 and was completed by Anselmi & DeCicco, Inc. of Maplewood, NJ.

On September 12, 2023, the eastbound platform and station house fully reopened. All work on Elizabeth station finished by June 2024, resulting in a ribbon cutting ceremony on June 18, 2024. The 1971 structure remained until June 18, 2024, when upgrades by NJ Transit were opened to the public.

== Station layout ==
The station has two high-level side platforms; Amtrak's Northeast Corridor trains do not stop.

== S-curve improvements ==
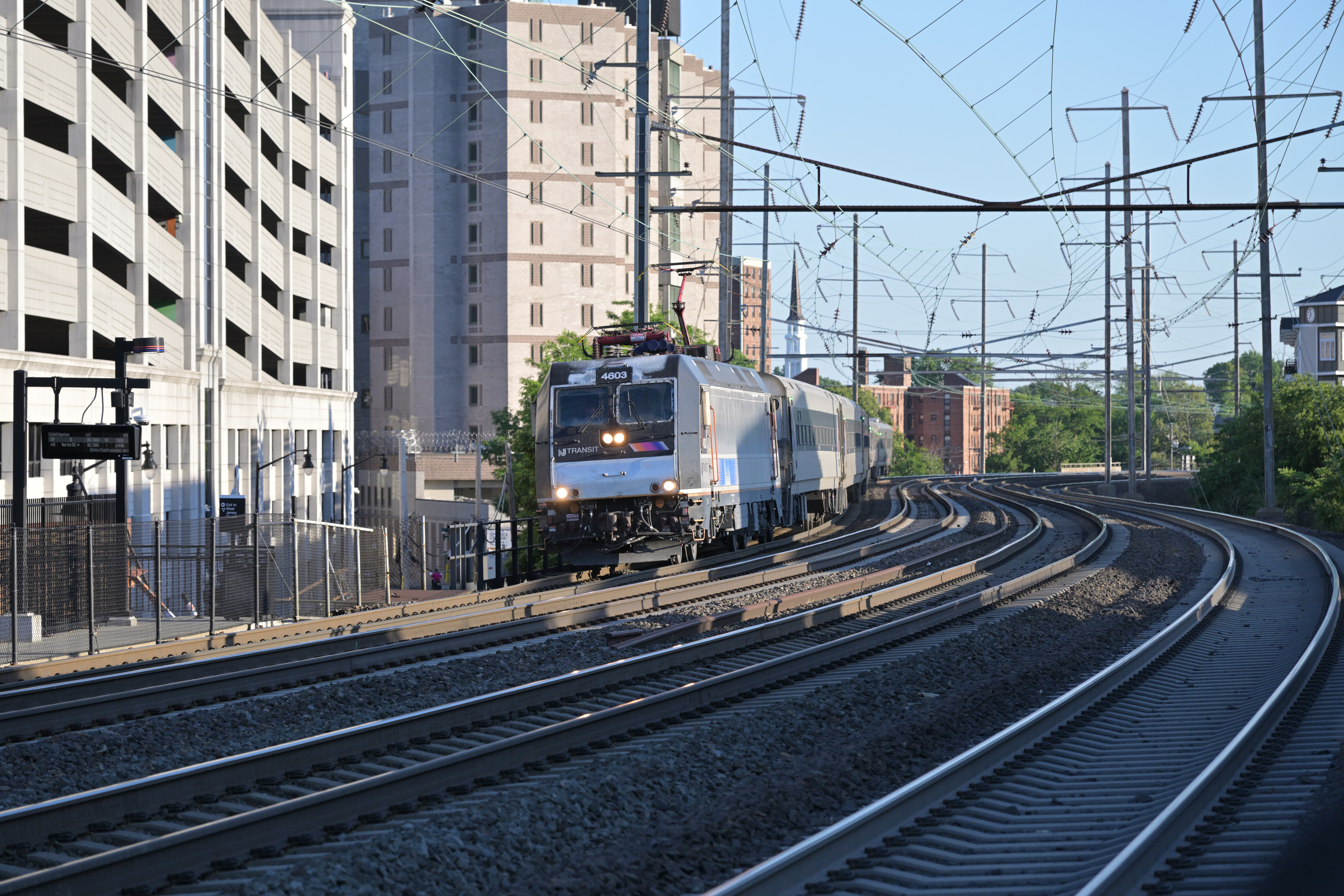
An NJT train on the S-curve south of the station

The Elizabeth S-curve limits speeds imposed by the transition between the two curves in the S-curve. There have been many discussions over possible improvements. Amtrak says the current speed limit is 80 miles per hour (130 km/h) for Acela and 70 miles per hour (110 km/h) for Northeast Regionals. However, in practice trains operate more slowly “due to a restrictive ‘approach limited’ signaling that governs the approach to Elizabeth, requiring trains to make a braking application.”. In technical terms, the issue is due to restrictive ‘approach limited’ signaling (causing all trains to slow down to 55 miles per hour (89 km/h) before speeding back up to the speed limit) and the station needs to be converted to 562 signaling and specified through ACSES transponders to allow travel at the stated speed limit.

If rebuilt, with the track provided with aggressive banking and using modern rolling stock, the speed limit could be raised to 135 miles per hour (217 km/h), pushing the northern end of the high speed section in New Jersey closer to Newark. This is included in the improvements Amtrak has planned for the NEC.

== See also ==
- List of closed Amtrak stations
- List of New Jersey Transit stations
- Mid-Town Historic District (Elizabeth, New Jersey)
