= Bernardsville station =

NJ Transit rail station

Bernardsville
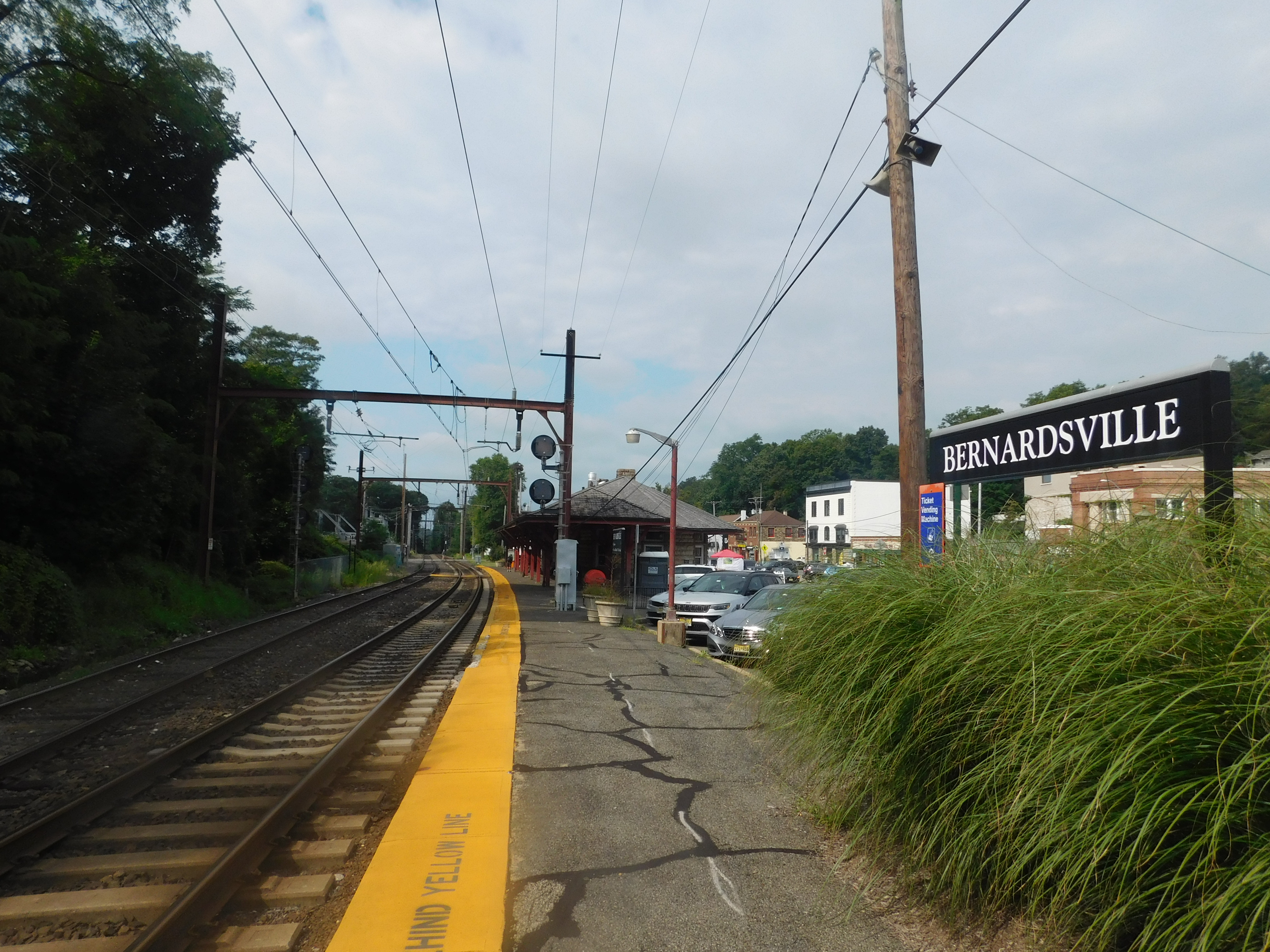
- Bernardsville station in August 2025, facing eastbound

General information
- Location: 202 Railroad Plaza, Bernardsville, New Jersey 07924
- Owner: New Jersey Transit
- Platforms: 1 side platform
- Tracks: 2
- Connections: Lakeland Bus Lines: 78

Construction
- Accessible: No

Other information
- Station code: 715 (Delaware, Lackawanna and Western)
- Fare zone: 16

History
- Opened: January 29, 1872
- Electrified: January 6, 1931

Key dates
- July 1, 1981: Station agency closed

Passengers
- 2025: 104 (average weekday)
- Rank: 117 of 153

Services
| Preceding station | NJ Transit | Following station |
|---|---|---|
| Far Hills toward Gladstone | Gladstone Branch | Basking Ridge toward New York or Hoboken |
Former services
| Preceding station | Delaware, Lackawanna and Western Railroad | Following station |
|---|---|---|
| Mine Brook toward Gladstone | Gladstone Branch | Basking Ridge toward Hoboken |
- Bernardsville Station
- U.S. National Register of Historic Places
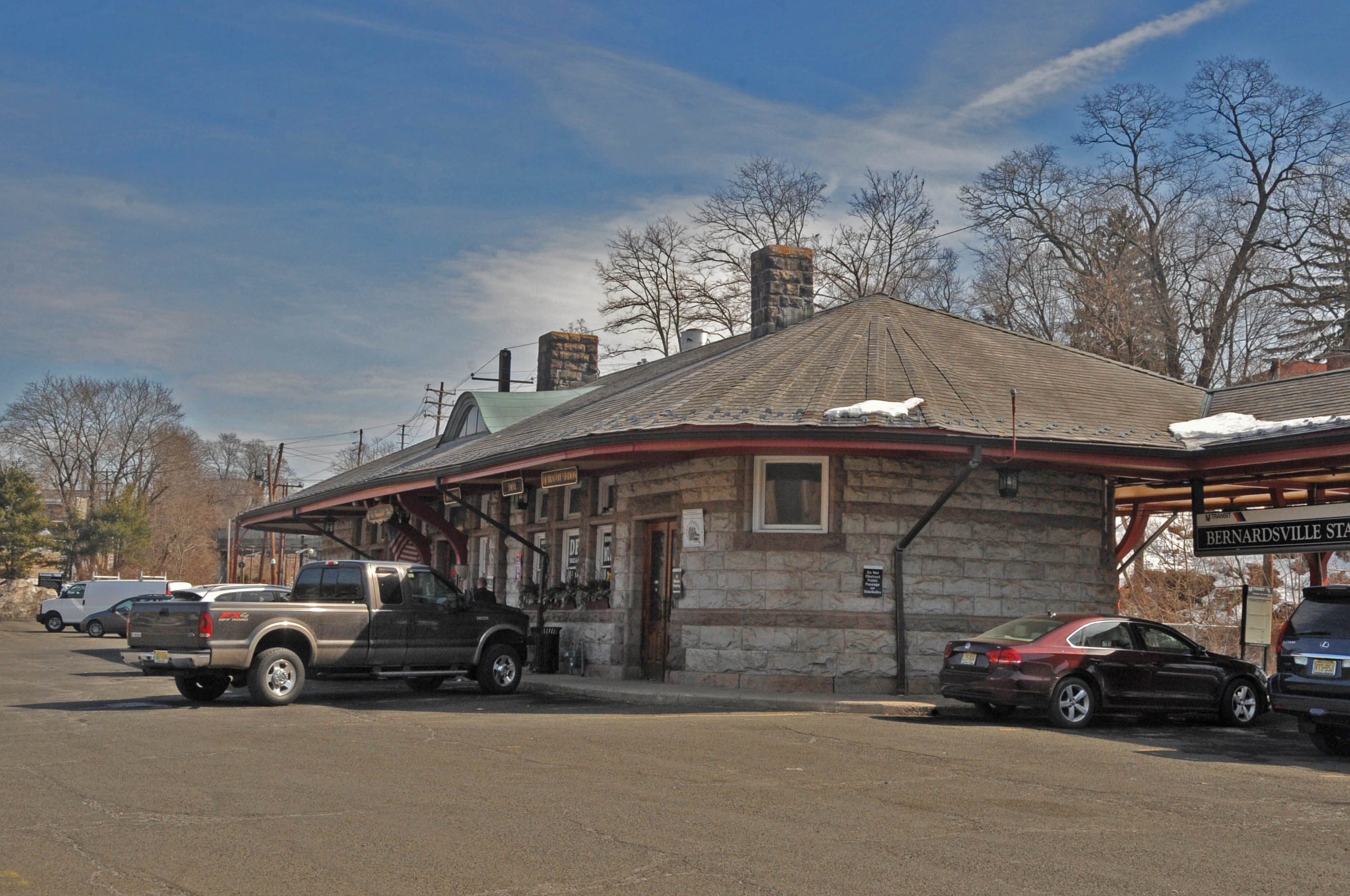
- Location: US 202, Bernardsville, New Jersey
- Coordinates: 40°43′01″N 74°34′16″W
- Built: 1901
- Architect: Bradford L. Gilbert
- Architectural style: Colonial Revival, Other, Romanesque, Richardsonian Romanesque
- MPS: Operating Passenger Railroad Stations TR
- NRHP reference No.: 84002786
- Added to NRHP: June 22, 1984
Location

Bernardsville is a New Jersey Transit station in Bernardsville, Somerset County, New Jersey along the Gladstone Branch of the Morris & Essex Lines, in the United States.

== History ==
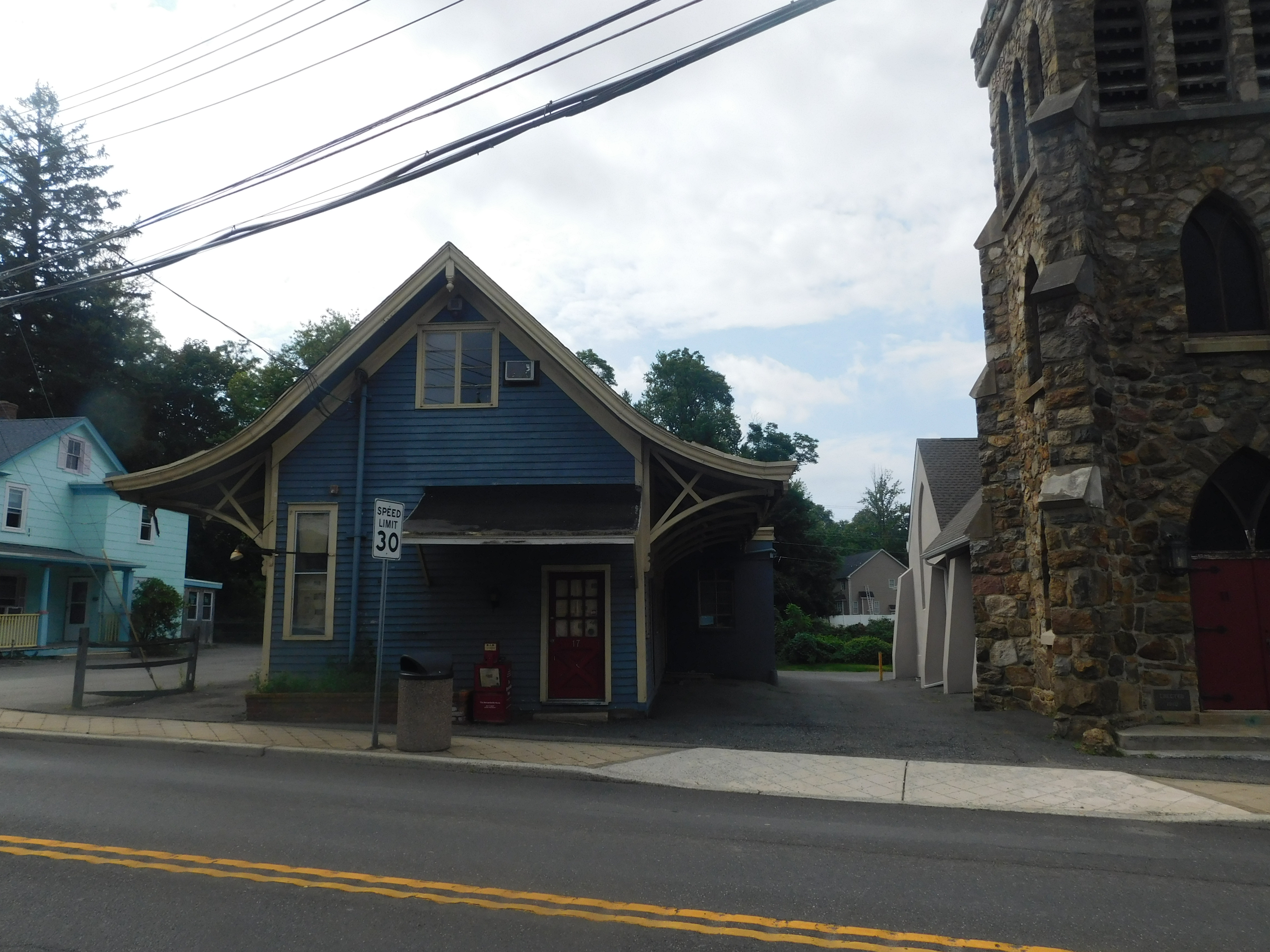
The 1872 station depot, moved away from the tracks, in August 2025

Bernardsville station opened on January 29, 1872, with the first New Jersey West Line Railroad train leaving Bernardsville for Summit station.

== Station layout ==
The station building, located on the north side of the tracks, is of stone-masonry construction. It was designed by architect Bradford Lee Gilbert. There is a convenience store/deli inside the station building with a large high-ceilinged seating area that was formerly a bank branch. A public restroom and ticket vending machine are available. In 1984 the building was added to the New Jersey Register of Historic Places and the National Register of Historic Places as part of the Operating Passenger Railroad Stations Thematic Resource.

Permitted parking is available at a cost of $377 per year. There are a limited number of hourly parking spots, as well as designated spots that allow free short-term parking after 10 a.m. A statue of the late Representative Millicent Fenwick stands near the pedestrian entrance to the station parking lot.

The station's one low-level side platform has a walkway across the main track, allowing passengers to reach the outer track.
