= Linden station (NJ Transit) =

NJ Transit rail station

Linden
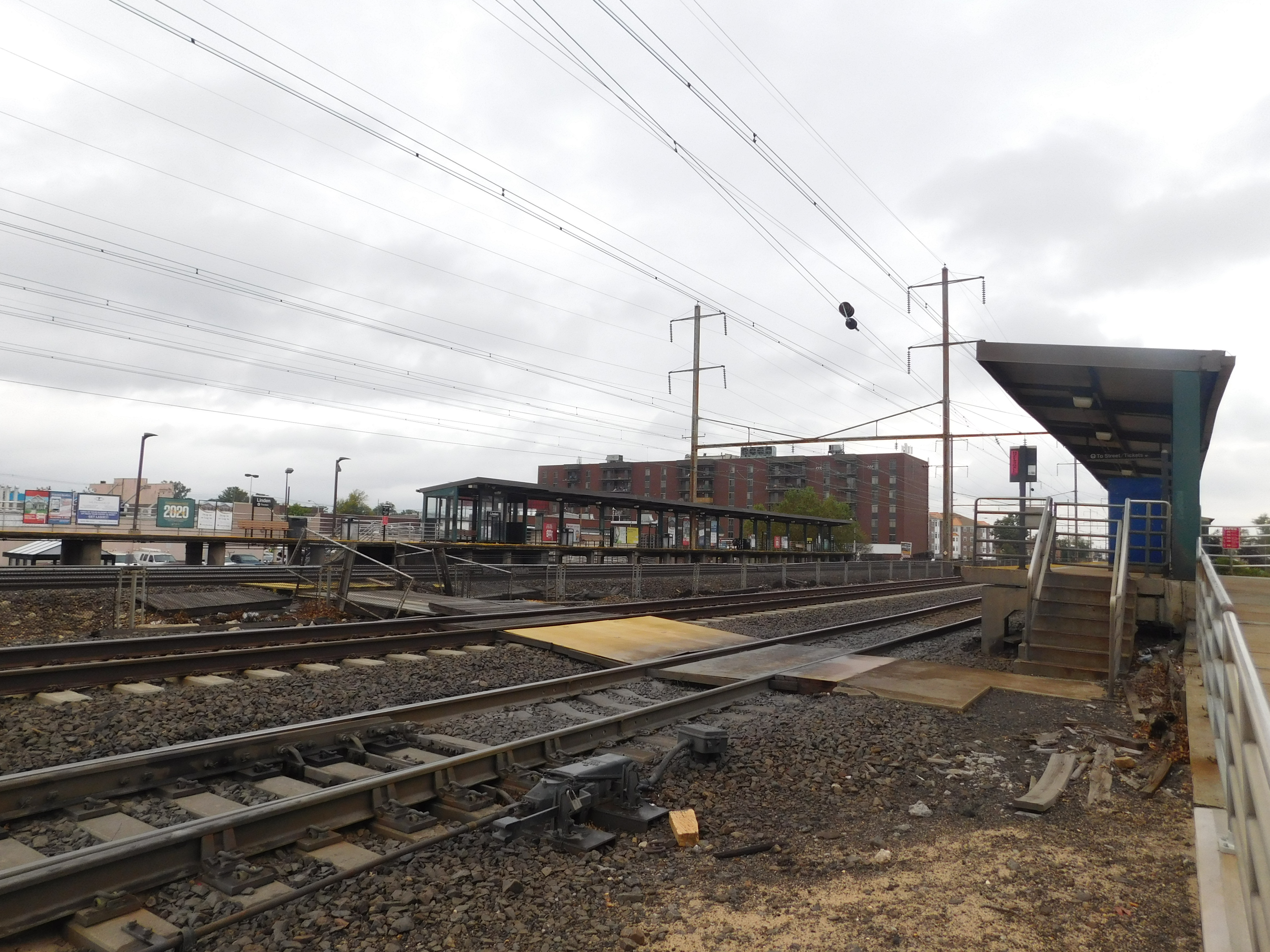
- Linden station in September 2020.

General information
- Location: South Wood Avenue; Linden, New Jersey
- Coordinates: 40.6293°N 74.25218°W
- Owner: New Jersey Transit
- Line: Amtrak Northeast Corridor
- Platforms: 2 side platforms
- Tracks: 6
- Connections: NJ Transit Bus: 56, 57, 94

Construction
- Parking: Yes
- Cycle facilities: Yes
- Accessible: Yes

Other information
- Fare zone: 7

History
- Opened: c. 1843
- Electrified: December 8, 1932
- Former names: Wheat Sheaf

Passengers
- 2025: 1924 (average weekday)
- Rank: 19 of 153

Services
Preceding station	NJ Transit	Following station
Rahway toward Trenton	Northeast Corridor Line	Elizabeth toward New York
Rahway toward Bay Head	North Jersey Coast Line	Elizabeth toward New York
Former services
Preceding station	NJ Transit	Following station
North Rahway (closed 1993) toward Trenton	Northeast Corridor Line	Elizabeth toward New York
North Rahway (closed 1993) toward Bay Head	North Jersey Coast Line	Elizabeth toward New York
Preceding station	Pennsylvania Railroad	Following station
Rahway toward Chicago	Main Line	Elizabeth toward New York or Exchange Place
Scott Avenue toward New Brunswick	New Brunswick Line	South Elizabeth toward New York or Exchange Place
Location

Linden is an active commuter railroad station in the township of Linden, Union County, New Jersey. Located at the overpass of Wood Avenue, the station serves trains on New Jersey Transit's Northeast Corridor Line and North Jersey Coast Line. Amtrak trains that operate on the Northeast Corridor, including the Northeast Regional, Acela Express, and Keystone, all bypass the station on the middle tracks. Linden station contains two high-level side platforms, with the Trenton-bound tracks being longer than the Penn Station-bound platform. The former Pennsylvania Railroad depot sits on the side of South Wood Avenue on the Penn Station side of the tracks.

Railroad service through what is now Linden began on January 1, 1836 with the extension of the New Jersey Railroad from Elizabeth to Rahway. The railroad established a stop near the former Wheatsheaf Inn in Elizabethtown, a tavern that served as a stop during the American Revolution. In 1865, Ferdinand Blancke, a New York City restauranteur, purchased land around Wheat Sheaf station for development, naming the area as Linden.

== Station layout ==
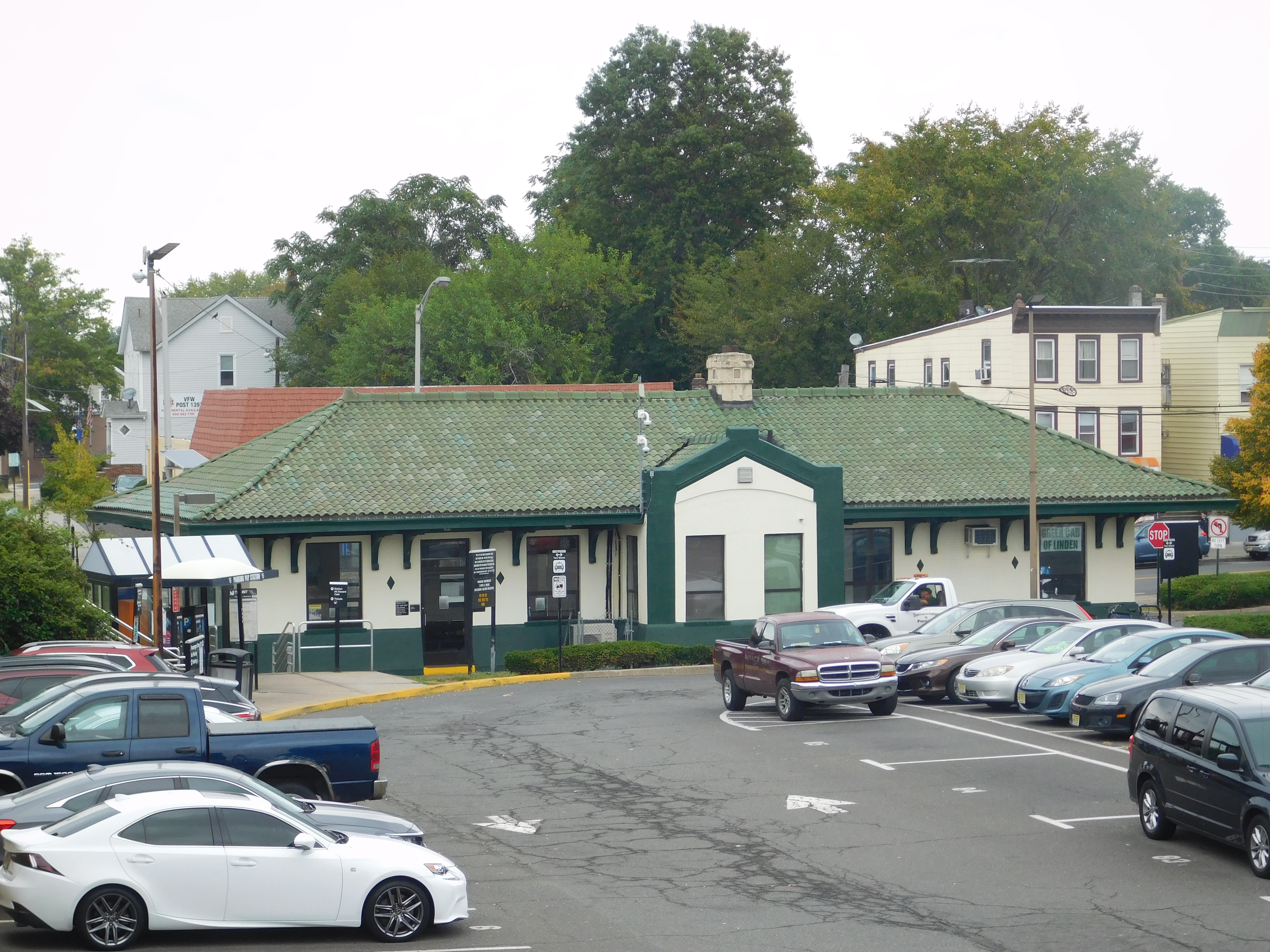
Linden's former Pennsylvania Railroad station in September 2020

The Trenton-bound platform for Track B is nearly twice as long as the New York-bound one for Track A. On its northern end, it has a long staircase up to it from Wood Avenue, which runs under the line, alongside a driveway that leads into the 464-space parking lot along this platform. The staircase has a short landing a gated off wooden low-level platform that stretches through all six tracks. The platform is canopied for its first quarter length with a small, enclosed shelter. There is another staircase and ramp, which ends nearly at the platform's northern end, down to the parking lot here. By the staircase are two shelters, one enclosing parking Muni-Meters and the other two Ticket Vending Machines. Towards the platform's southern end has another staircase to the parking lot near its main entrance from Elizabeth Avenue.

The Wood Avenue overpass has an abandoned staircase between Track A and 1 that lead up to a small low-level platform for Tracks 1 and 2. The tracks are labeled in the underpass with small black numbers and letters. The shorter New York-bound platform is entirely canopied with green supports. It begins on the northern side of the Wood Avenue overpass with the back of its windscreen painted blue and a "Welcome to Linden" message. The historic station house runs along the south side of the street adjacent to this platform. It is a cream-colored building with green trim and a green roof with a now unstaffed waiting room. Inside are wooden benches with arms and the closed ticket window. Behind the station house are two shelters, one covering Ticket Vending Machines and the other parking Muni-Meters, and the only staircase up to the platform. This leads to a 141-space parking lot with entrances from Wood Avenue and Penn Place. At the platform's southern end is a blocked off staircase going down to low-level wooden platforms and long wheelchair ramp that leads down into the parking lot.

Amtrak's Northeast Corridor services bypass the station via the inner tracks.

== Bibliography ==
- Honeyman, Abraham Van Doren (1923). History of Union County, New Jersey 1664-1923 Volume 2. Lewis Historical Publishing Company.
