= Gladstone station (NJ Transit) =

NJ Transit rail station

Gladstone
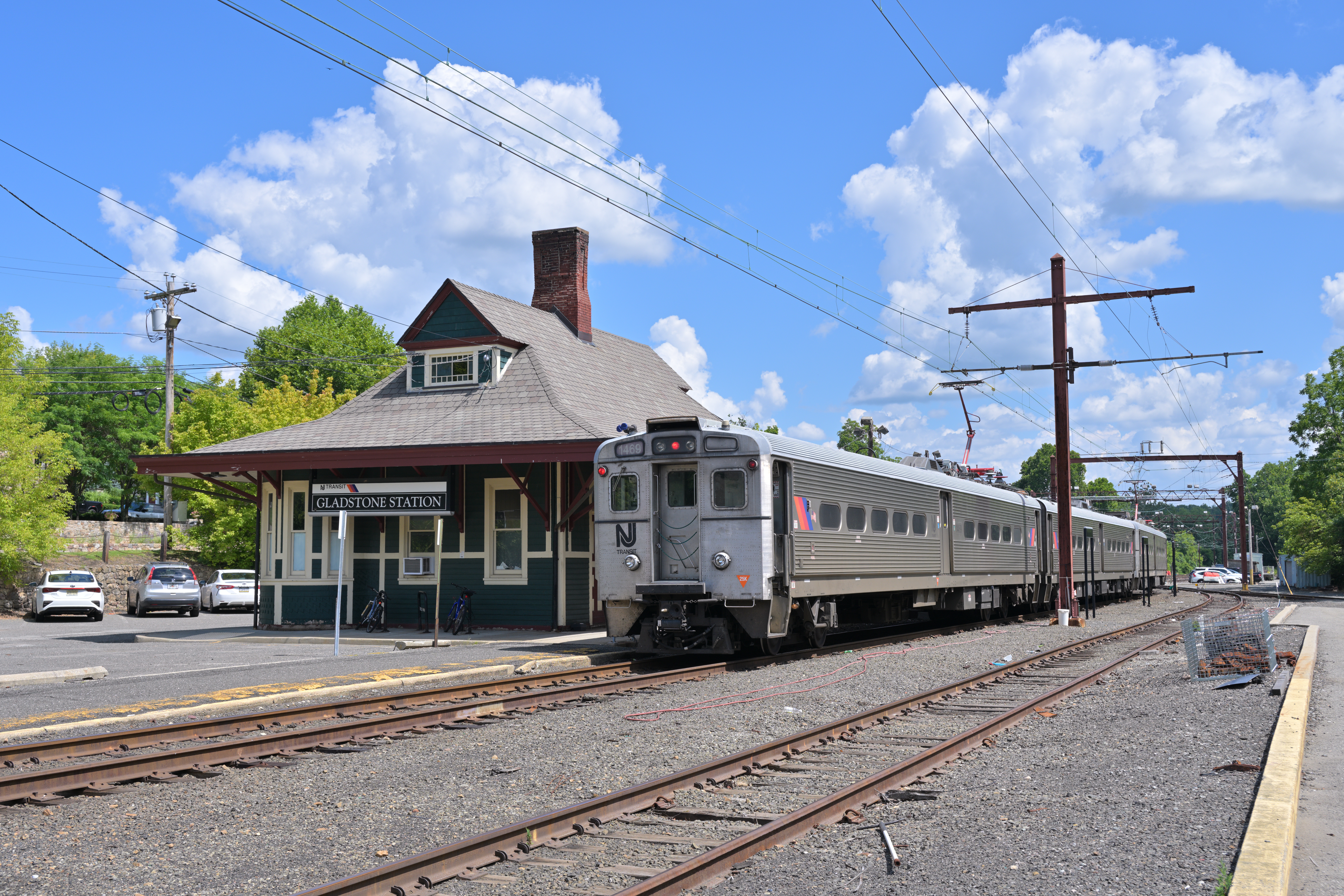

General information
- Location: Main Street (CR 512), Gladstone, Peapack and Gladstone, New Jersey 07934
- Owner: New Jersey Transit
- Platforms: 1 side platform
- Tracks: 3

Construction
- Parking: Yes
- Cycle facilities: Yes
- Accessible: Yes

Other information
- Station code: 722 (Delaware, Lackawanna and Western)
- Fare zone: 18

History
- Opened: October 10, 1890
- Electrified: January 6, 1931

Key dates
- July 1, 1981: Station agency closed

Passengers
- 2025: 57 (average weekday)
- Rank: 137 of 153

Services
Preceding station	NJ Transit	Following station
Terminus	Gladstone Branch	Peapack toward New York or Hoboken
Former services
Preceding station	Delaware, Lackawanna and Western Railroad	Following station
Terminus	Gladstone Branch	Peapack toward Hoboken
- Gladstone Station
- U.S. National Register of Historic Places
- New Jersey Register of Historic Places
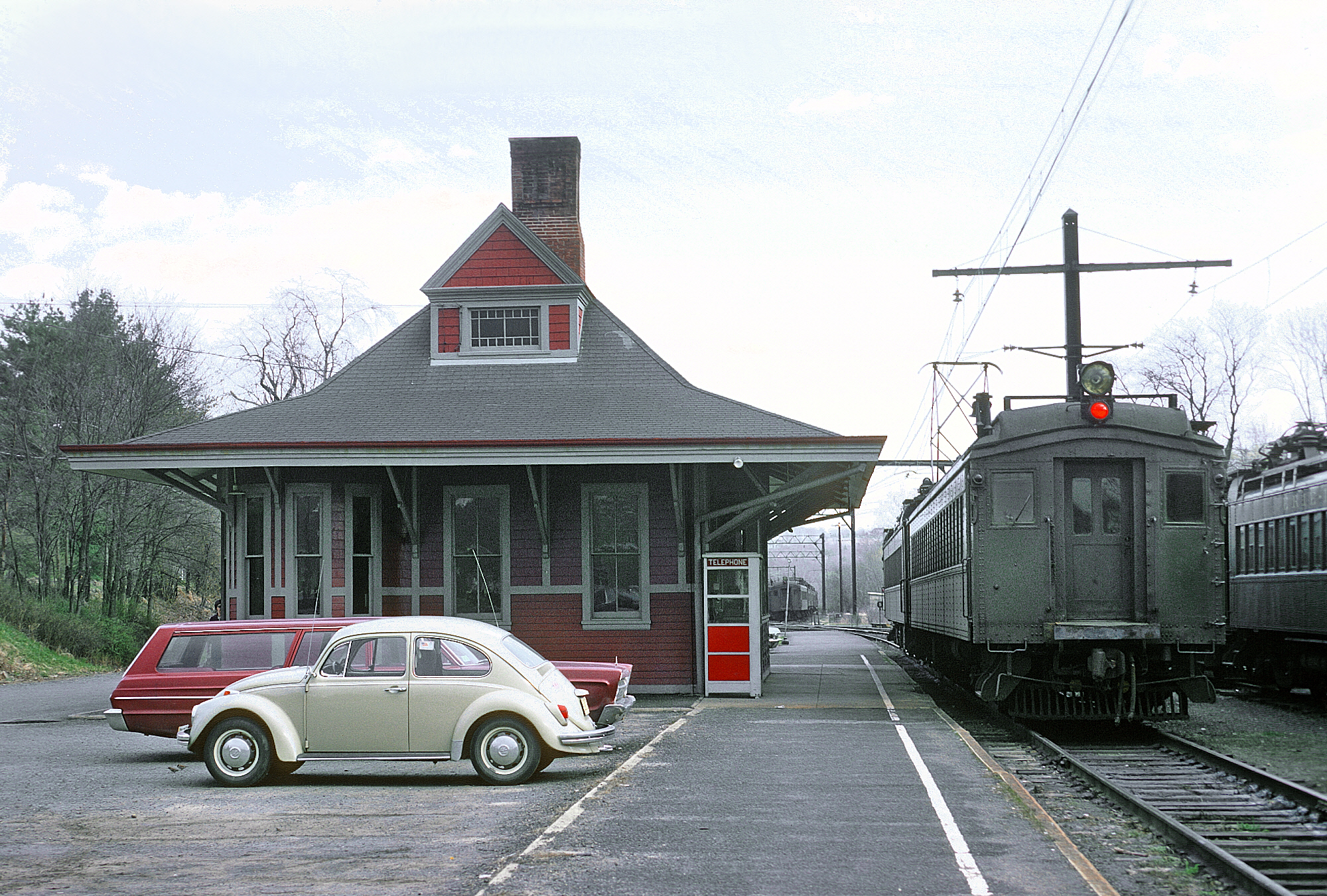
- Gladstone station in April 1970.
- Location: Gladstone, New Jersey
- Coordinates: 40°43′13″N 74°39′59″W
- Area: 1 acre (0.4 ha)
- Built: October 10, 1890
- Architectural style: Queen Anne
- MPS: Operating Passenger Railroad Stations TR
- NRHP reference No.: 84002792
- NJRHP No.: 2577

Significant dates
- Added to NRHP: June 22, 1984
- Designated NJRHP: March 17, 1984
Location

Gladstone is a New Jersey Transit station in Peapack-Gladstone, Somerset County, New Jersey, United States. It is the western terminus of the Gladstone Branch of the Morris and Essex line. A yard is to the east of the station.

The original 1891 wood station and freight station remains in service. The head house has been on the state and federal registers of historic places since 1984, listed as part of the Operating Passenger Railroad Stations Thematic Resource.

== Station layout ==
The station has a 4-car high-level side platform and an Americans With Disabilities Act of 1990 compliant ramp.

== See also ==
- List of New Jersey Transit stations
- National Register of Historic Places listings in Somerset County, New Jersey
