= Newark Drawbridge =

Railroad bridge on the Passaic River between Newark and Harrison, New Jersey, U.S.

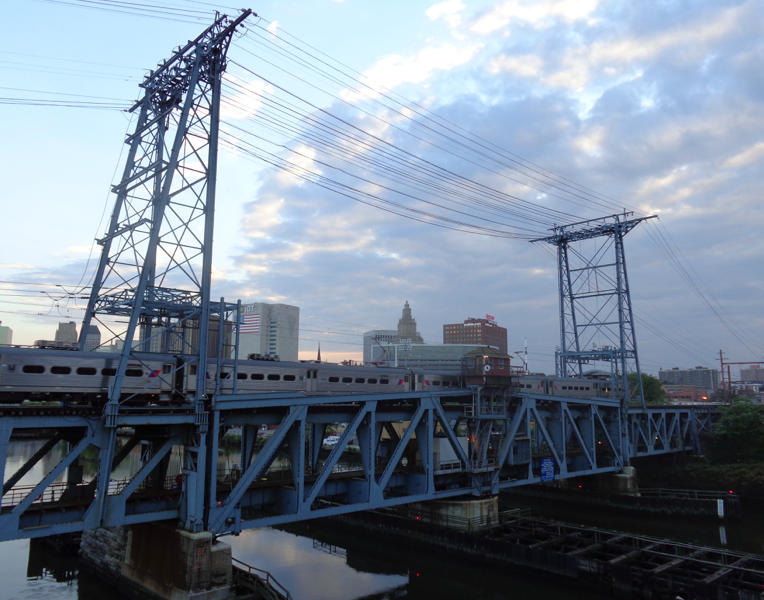
- The bridge in 2014
- Coordinates: 40°44′51″N 74°09′57″W
- Carries: NJ Transit
- Crosses: Passaic River
- Locale: Newark and Harrison; Northeastern New Jersey
- Other name: Morristown Line Bridge
- Owner: New Jersey Transit
- Maintained by: NJT
- ID number: NJT 247

Characteristics
- Design: Swing bridge
- Total length: 870.1 feet (265.2 m)
- Width: 30.2 feet (9.2 m)
- Longest span: 221.1 feet (67.4 m)
- Clearance below: 20 feet (6.1 m) (low tide)

Rail characteristics
- No. of tracks: 2
- Electrified: 25 kV 60 Hz

History
- Opened: 1903

Location
- Interactive map of Newark Drawbridge

The Newark Drawbridge, also known as the Morristown Line Bridge, is a railroad swing bridge on the Passaic River between Newark and Harrison, New Jersey. It is the 11th bridge from the river's mouth at Newark Bay and is 5.85 miles (9.41 km) upstream from it. Opened in 1903, it is owned and operated by New Jersey Transit.

== History ==
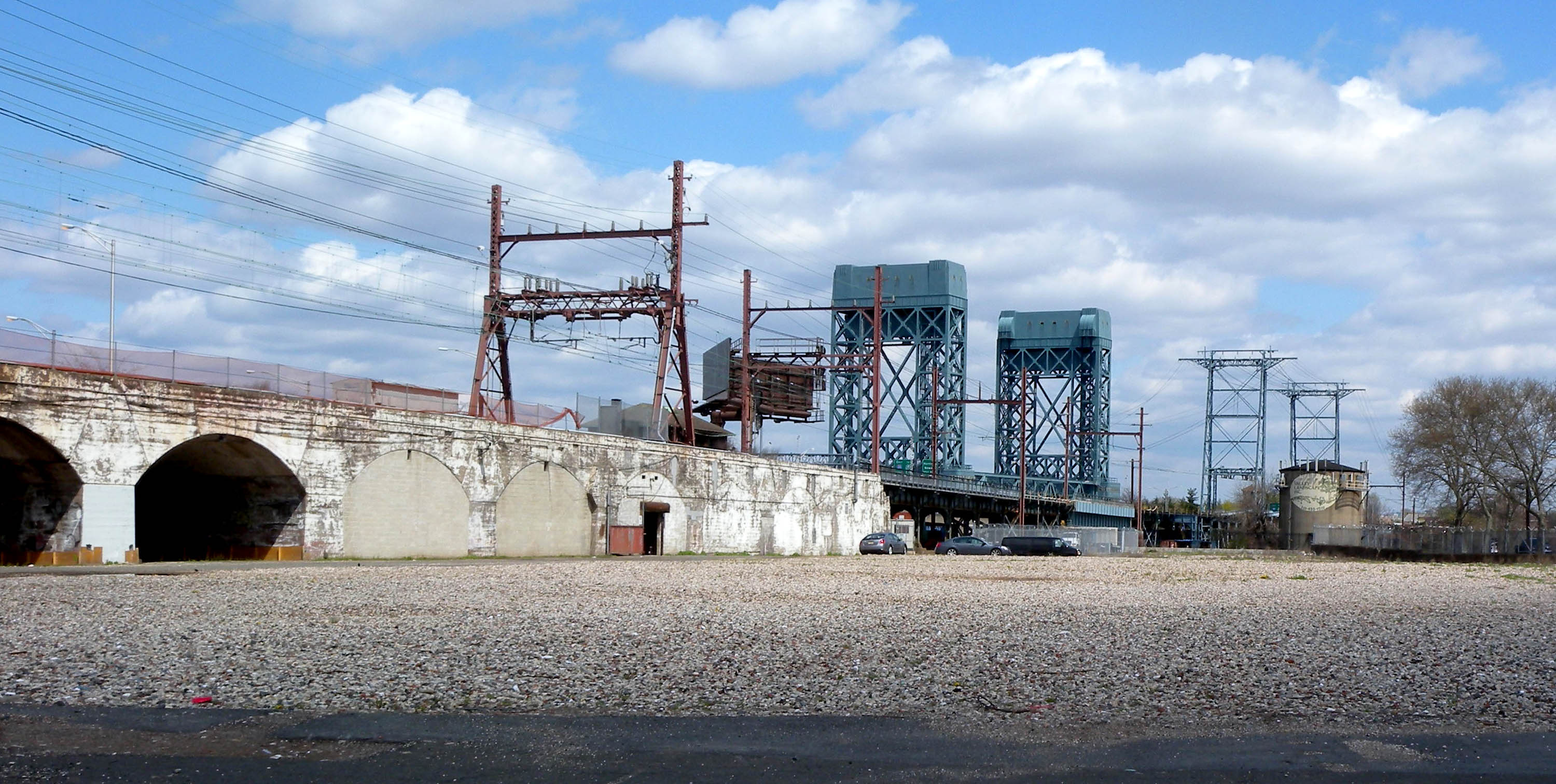
Approach to bridge from Newark Broad Street with Stickel Bridge in the background

Rail service across the river was generally oriented to bringing passengers and freight from the points west over the Hackensack Meadows to Bergen Hill, where tunnels and cuts provided access to terminals on the Hudson River.

In 1836, the Morris and Essex Railroad established a right-of-way from the west at Orange to Newark, from where it used the New Jersey Rail Road at Centre Street to cross the river and travel east to its terminal at Paulus Hook on the waterfront in Jersey City. By 1855 it built its own bridge across the Passaic. By the early 1860s, the railroad had established the alignment across the Kearny Meadows and began using the Long Dock Tunnel to Hoboken.

In the early 1900s railroad elevated the line approaching the river which previously ran at grade along Division Street in Newark and built the current bridge. Completed in an earlier phase, the bridge was later shifted 35 feet (11 m) upstream on the new alignment.

In 1945, the Morris and Essex Railroad officially merged into the Delaware, Lackawanna and Western Railroad. DL&W merged with the Erie Railroad in 1960 to form the Erie Lackawanna Railroad, which was absorbed by Conrail in 1976; New Jersey Transit has operated all passenger service since 1983.

On November 5, 2026, the got stuck in the elevated position after opening to let marine traffic pass. This caused major disruptions for trains heading to Hoboken.

== Operations ==
The lower 17 miles (27 km) of the ninety-mile (140 km) long Passaic River downstream of the Dundee Dam is tidally influenced and navigable, but due to the limited maritime traffic the bridge is infrequently required to open. Since 1998 rules regulating drawbridge operations require a 24-hour notice. The bridge at milepost 7.48 is used exclusively by New Jersey Transit rail operations for the Montclair-Boonton Line and both branches of the Morris and Essex Lines, the Morristown Line and the Gladstone Branch. It is situated just east of Newark Broad Street Station, the first stop after the lines travelling west from Hoboken Terminal and Secaucus Junction converge. In 2004, NJT contracted a study to determine the condition of the bridge and to begin long-term planning for its future replacement. In 2009-2010, the bridge underwent $23 million project for maintenance and repairs, funded by the agency and performed by Skanska.

There are unfunded plans to replace the bridge with a three track bridge as it is a bottleneck due to having only two tracks while the rest of the line has three tracks.

== See also ==
- Lower Hack Lift
- Bergen Tunnels
- Timeline of Jersey City area railroads
- List of crossings of the Lower Passaic River
- List of bridges, tunnels, and cuts in Hudson County, New Jersey
- NJT movable bridges
