= Chatham station (NJ Transit) =

NJ Transit rail station

Chatham
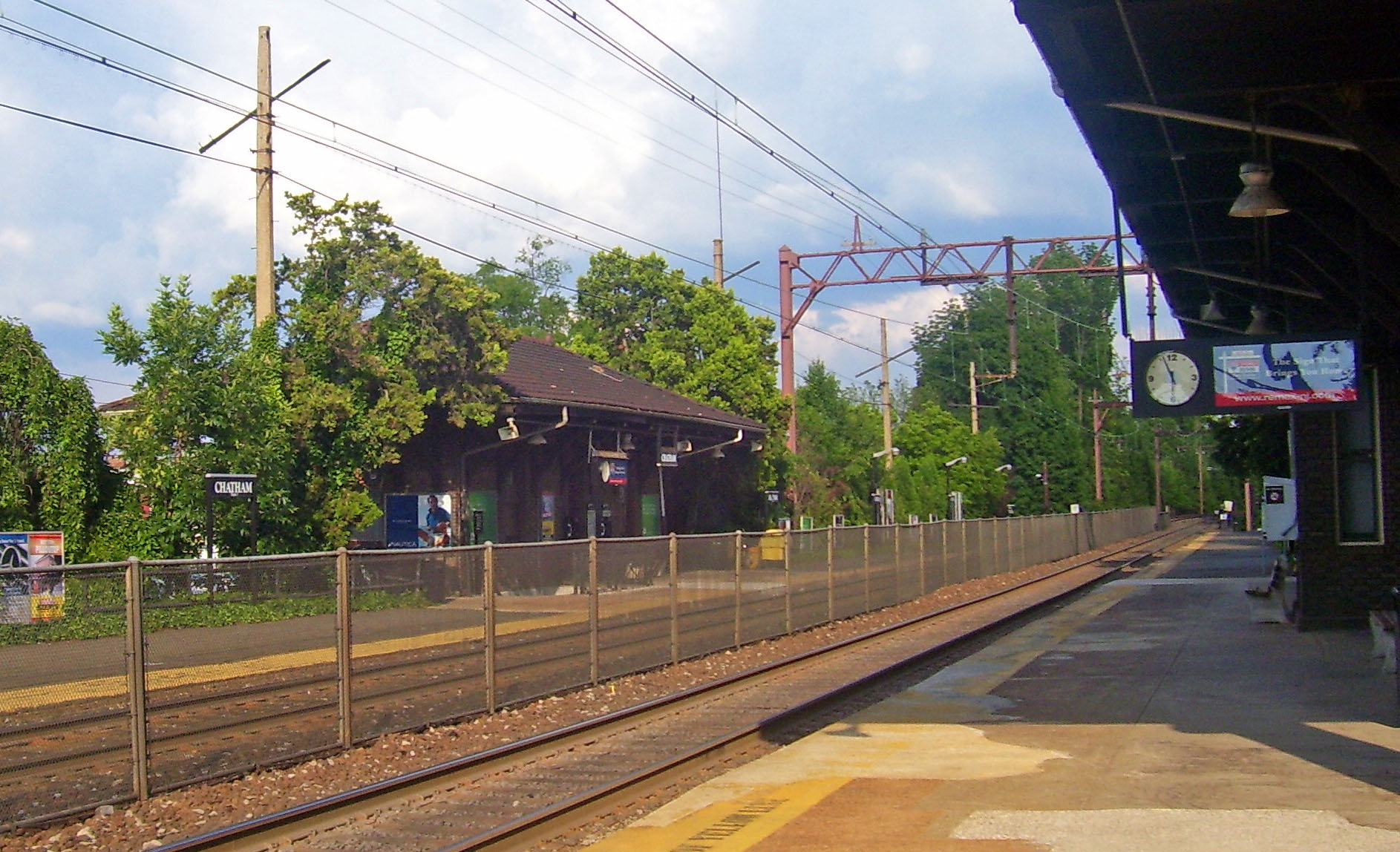
- View east along tracks from south platform

General information
- Location: Railroad Plaza and Fairmount Avenue; Chatham, New Jersey 07928
- Coordinates: 40°44′24.6″N 74°23′6.2″W
- Platforms: 2 side platforms
- Tracks: 2
- Connections: NJT Bus: 873

Construction
- Parking: 420 spaces
- Cycle facilities: yes

Other information
- Station code: 424 (Delaware, Lackawanna and Western)
- Fare zone: 10

History
- Opened: September 17, 1837 (preliminary trip); September 28, 1837 (regular service)
- Rebuilt: Summer 1913–June 19, 1914
- Electrified: December 18, 1930

Key dates
- August 1914: Original station depot razed

Passengers
- 2025: 980 (average weekday)
- Rank: 32 of 153

Services
Preceding station	NJ Transit	Following station
Madison toward Hackettstown	Morristown Line	Summit toward New York or Hoboken
Former services
Preceding station	Delaware, Lackawanna and Western Railroad	Following station
Madison toward Buffalo	Main Line	Summit toward Hoboken
Location

Chatham is a railway station in Chatham, New Jersey. A commuter rail station, Chatham receives rail service from statewide provider NJ Transit on its Morristown Line, a branch of the Morris & Essex Lines. Trains on the Morristown Line go to both Hoboken Terminal and New York Penn Station.

== History ==
Chatham station opened on September 28, 1837 along with other stations on the Morris and Essex Railroad between Orange (at one time the western terminus of the line) and Morristown. During the beginnings of the rail in the area, Chatham was the home of a relatively well-utilised and large rail yard because of the steep grades in the surrounding area. In the early 1900s, the station was mainly used by vacationers from New York City who came to Chatham to experience what was then considered a beautiful town away from the bustling city. A number of hotels on Main Street served this vacation interest.

A new elevated station was built in 1914 with a tunnel connecting the two platforms. The station was located at Fairmount Avenue, one block from Main Street. Distinctive weeping Mulberry trees were planted to enhance the station and the area of its two plazas. The railroad razed the old station in August 1914.

The presence of a train station in Chatham Borough would later prove a vital role in population increases following World War II in adjacent Chatham Township, when rural lands in the township began to be developed for residential use, because of the easy commute to Manhattan.

In 1929, the Delaware, Lackawanna and Western Railroad, the owners of the railway at the time, spent $100 million to electrify the Morris & Essex lines. This meant that Chatham station would be electrified and would be served by electric trains, some of the first in the United States. During summer 2007, operator New Jersey Transit replaced the tracks at Chatham along with those on the rest of the Morristown Line, upgrading them to have more advanced and reliable concrete ties rather than older wooden types. The exterior of the station recently went under renovation. Some of the renovations the station received included a new paint job and a new roof.

== Station layout and service ==
Chatham is located on New Jersey Transit's Morristown Line of the Morris & Essex Lines. The station receives traffic bound for and coming from both of New Jersey Transit's main terminals: Hoboken Terminal and New York Penn Station. Trains bound eastward toward these two nodes arrive in an alternating fashion at Chatham, so that a Hoboken bound train will be followed by a New York bound train. Service is relatively frequent, with morning rush hour trains arriving at intervals of as little as six minutes. During off-peak hours, trains heading toward each node come at hourly gaps, meaning a train arrives at Chatham almost every thirty minutes during non-rush hour times. This amount of service is only comparable to that of the Northeast Corridor Line.

== Bibliography ==
- Douglass, A.M. (1912). The Railroad Trainman, Volume 29. Cleveland, Ohio: Brotherhood of Railroad Trainmen.
- Walker, Herbert T. (1902). "Early History of the Delaware, Lackawanna & Western Railroad and it's Locomotives - Part 2: The Morris and Essex Railroad". Railroad Gazette. 34.
