= Morristown Line =

Commuter rail line in New Jersey

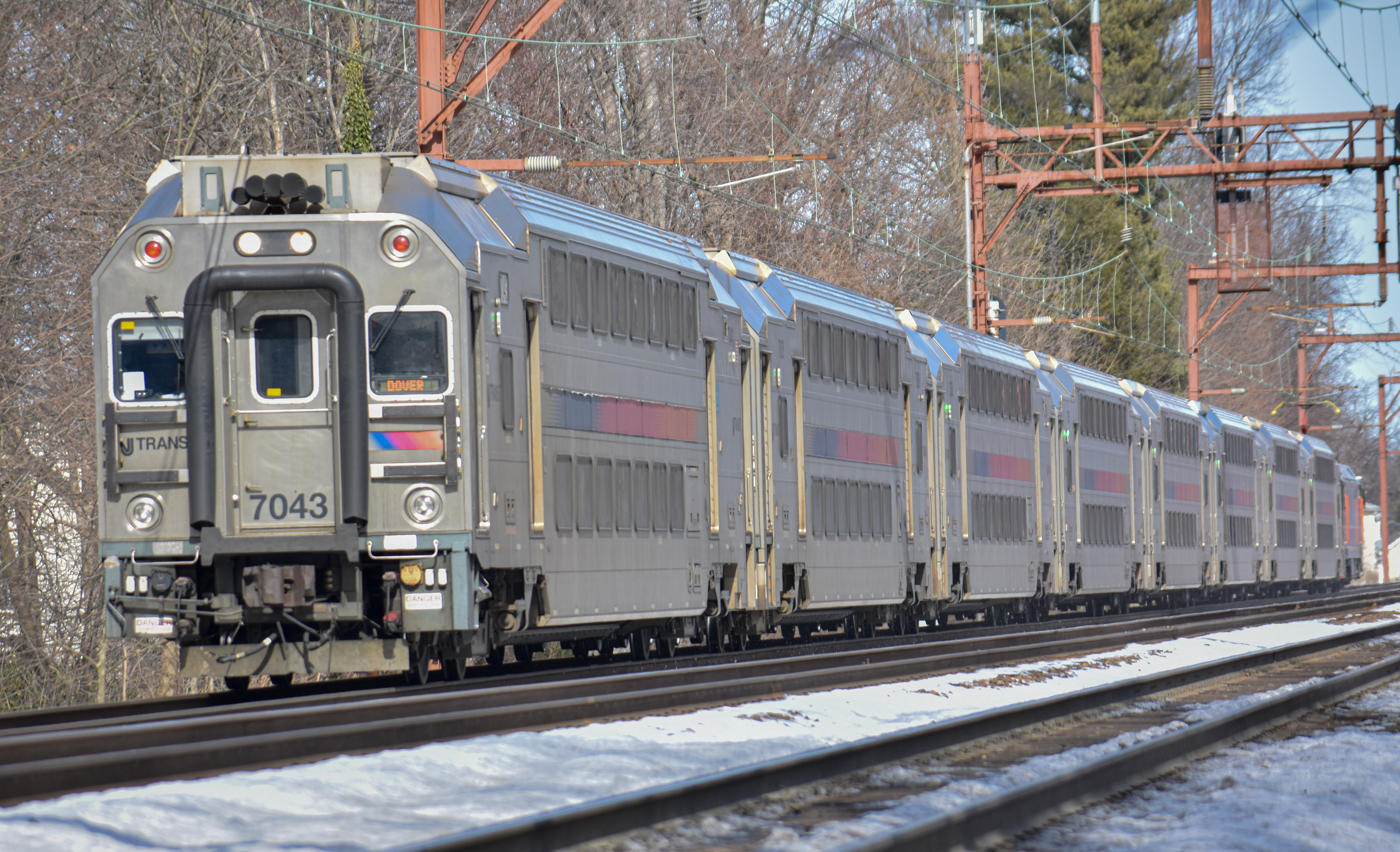
- A Dover-bound Morristown Line train preparing to bypass Mountain Station

Overview
- Owner: Amtrak (New York Penn Station to Kearny Connection); New Jersey Transit (all other trackage)
- Locale: Northern New Jersey
- Termini: Hoboken Terminal or New York Penn Station; Dover Hackettstown (limited service) Mount Olive (limited service)
- Stations: 26

Service
- Type: Commuter rail
- System: New Jersey Transit Rail Operations
- Operator(s): New Jersey Transit
- Rolling stock: ALP-46 GP40PH-2 F40PH PL42AC GP40FH-2 and ALP-45DP locomotives, MultiLevel coaches, Comet II, IV & V coaches, Arrow III multiple units
- Daily ridership: 37,850 (Q1, FY 2025) (Note: Includes ridership from Gladstone Line)

History
- Opened: November 19, 1836 (Newark–Orange); January 1, 1838 (Orange–Morristown); July 4, 1848 (Morristown–Rockaway); July 31, 1848 (Rockaway–Dover); January 16, 1854 (Dover–Hackettstown); June 10, 1996 (New York–Newark via Kearny Connection/Midtown Direct)

Technical
- Line length: 57.4 mi (92.4 km)
- Track gauge: 4 ft 8 1/2 in (1,435 mm) standard gauge
- Electrification: Overhead line, 25 kV 60 Hz AC

The Morristown Line is an NJ Transit commuter rail line connecting Morris and Essex counties to New York City, via New York Penn Station or Hoboken Terminal. It is one of the two routes that make up the Morris & Essex Lines, alongside the Gladstone Branch. Out of 52 inbound and 53 outbound daily weekday trains, 34 inbound and 37 outbound Midtown Direct trains (about 67%) use the Kearny Connection (opened June 10, 1996) to Penn Station, and the rest go to Hoboken. Passengers can transfer at Newark Broad Street or Summit to reach another destination. On rail system maps, the line is colored dark green, and its symbol is a drum, a reference to Morristown's history during the American Revolution.

There is hourly service to/from New York (none going beyond Dover) on weekends. Until August 13, 2006, there was also hourly service to Hoboken. On that date, service between Hoboken and Summit was cut back to once every two hours on weekends. On May 11, 2008, off-peak weekday Hoboken-Dover trains (600 Series) were cut. In addition, weekend Gladstone trains were cut back to Summit, and a shuttle train is operated every two hours between Newark Broad Street and Hoboken Terminal.

== History ==
The majority of the Morristown Line consists of the former Morris and Essex Railroad which was incorporated on January 29, 1835; the first section of the railroad, which ran from Newark to Orange, opened on November 19, 1836. Trains also ran to Jersey City via an agreement with the New Jersey Rail Road. The railroad was later extended to Morristown on January 1, 1838. The line was eventually extended to Phillipsburg in 1866 following extensions to Dover on July 31, 1848, and to Hackettstown in January 1854.

The Hoboken Land and Improvement Company operated a ferry across the Hudson River between Hoboken and New York City. Until early 1859 the NJRR paid the HL&I for the business that instead used the NJRR ferry. Because of this, the HL&I decided to help the M&E by building their new alignment, using the New York and Erie Railroad's Long Dock Tunnel. To use the Erie's tunnel a supplement to their charter was needed; this was passed March 8, 1860 after arguments against the bill from the NJRR. Another legal obstacle was the NJRR's monopoly over bridges, granted to the Passaic and Hackensack Bridge Company, invalidated by the state in 1861. The first excursion train operated on the new alignment on November 14, 1862, but a contract required the M&E to continue using the NJRR until October 13, 1863. The next day, regular service began via the new alignment.

=== DL&W ownership ===
The Delaware, Lackawanna and Western Railroad leased the M&E starting on December 31, 1868. Due to the fact that the DL&W used 6 ft (1,829 mm) broad gauge while the M&E used 4 ft 8 1/2 in (1,435 mm) standard gauge, the line between Washington and Denville had a third rail laid to make it compatible between the railroads. Eventually, the DL&W decided to convert to standard gauge and this was done on May 27, 1876.

Following a frog war with the Erie Railroad and congestion issues in the Long Dock Tunnel, the DL&W decided to construct its own tunnel to Hoboken Terminal. Construction on the North Bergen Tunnel began in 1873 and finished in 1877. This was later joined by the South Bergen Tunnel which began construction in 1906 and was finished in 1910.

The line was electrified between 1930 and 1931 at 3 kV DC. The M&E was eventually merged into the DL&W on July 26, 1945.

=== Later history ===
The DL&W later merged with the Erie Railroad in 1960 to become the Erie-Lackawanna Railroad. Eventually, Conrail took over operations in 1976. NJ Transit officially took over operations in 1983 from Conrail.

Work started on rehabilitating the line and converting the electrification system to 25 kV 60 Hz AC. This was eventually completed in 1984 alongside the retirement of the old MU cars in favor of Arrow III cars.

The Kearny Connection was opened in 1996 allowing one seat rides to New York without the need to transfer to PATH at Hoboken. NJ Transit named the new service Midtown Direct.

The Millburn-Summit segment underwent extensive rehabilitation in the mid-2010s. This included the replacement of the creosote crossties on both tracks with concrete crossties, the replacement of all crossties on the double trestle over Short Hills Avenue, and the replacement of several sections of rail. Work has also progressed on rehabilitating both tracks between Summit and Dover with concrete crossties and new welded rail, and rehabilitation of select road overpasses.

Hurricane Sandy inflicted considerable damage on the Morristown Line on October 29–30, 2012, as fallen trees brought down catenary and signal wires and washed out sections of track, most notably through the New Jersey Meadowlands on both the main line and the Kearny Connection. Midtown Direct service was restored from Dover to New York on November 12, 2012; service to Hoboken and west of Dover resumed on November 19.

== Description ==
The Morristown Line begins at Hoboken Terminal or at New York Penn Station. Trains departing for points west of Dover require diesel locomotives. Immediately after leaving Hoboken, the route passes the coach and diesel yards before entering the 1908 Bergen Tunnels under the New Jersey Palisades just past the East End interlocking. At the west portal of the Bergen Tunnel is West End interlocking, where the Main Line, Bergen County Line and Pascack Valley Line branch off to the north. The Morristown Line then crosses over Lower Hack Lift, a vertical lift bridge built in 1927 over the Hackensack River. The line crosses under Route 7 and then passes NJ Transit's Meadows Maintenance Complex (MMC).

Amtrak's Northeast Corridor and the New Jersey Turnpike cross overhead. The Midtown Direct trains join the Morristown line from New York at Kearny Jct. just past this overpass. The Morristown Line parallels the Amtrak Northeast Corridor and PATH lines and Interstate 280 (I-280) for a short distance here. The Waterfront Connection is just prior to the overpass at Meadows interlocking. It allows selected North Jersey Coast Line and Raritan Valley Line trains to reach Hoboken from the Northeast Corridor Line.

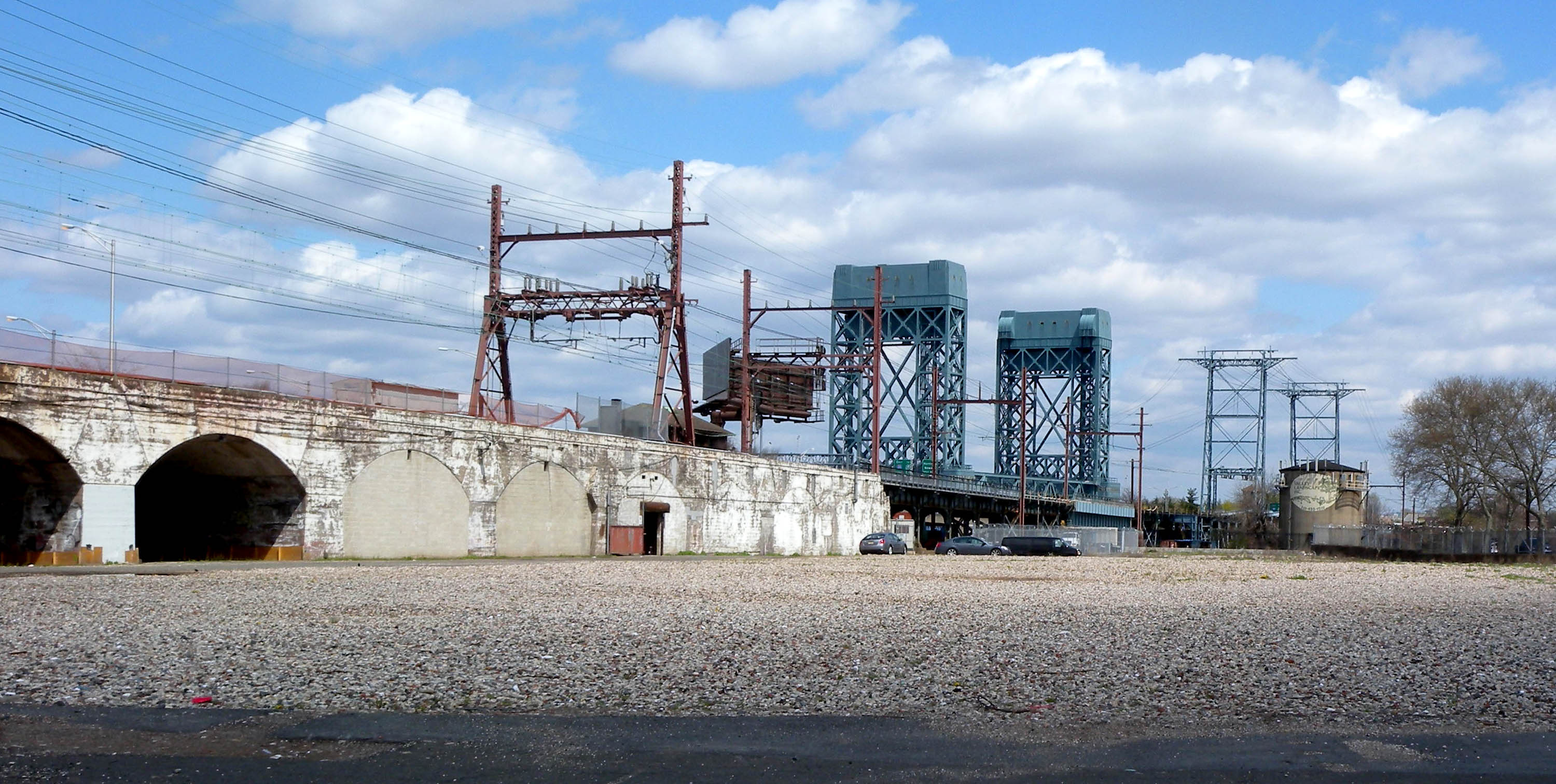
Newark Drawbridge over the Passaic River bridge. The swing bridge is to the right of the vehicular William A. Stickel Memorial Bridge (I-280) lift bridge in background

Passing Passaic River by NJT train, east of Broad Street, in Newark, NJ

The line begins its journey by following I-280 and crosses a two-track swing bridge over the Passaic River. It enters the newly renovated Newark Broad Street station, which features two high platforms serving all three tracks. Within the city limits of Newark, the line runs in a trench, passing beneath numerous streets, I-280, and the Newark City Subway. At the site of the former Roseville Avenue station, now known as the Roseville interlocking, the Montclair–Boonton Line diverges to the right. The section of the track extending westward from the Passaic River to just east of Millburn station is composed of triple tracks, while the remainder of the route to Lake Hopatcong station is a double-track railway.

After passing the abandoned station at Grove Street, now the location of Green interlocking, the line crosses the Garden State Parkway and reaches East Orange, which is situated on a viaduct. Subsequent elevated stations include Brick Church and Orange. The line then curves southward over Interstate 280, stopping at Highland Avenue and Mountain Station. The next station is South Orange, an elevated structure with two platforms and three tracks, near Seton Hall University. Maplewood follows, with a side platform and a center platform serving all westbound and some eastbound trains. Beyond Maplewood, the line narrows to two tracks at Millburn interlocking. Millburn and Short Hills stations each have two side platforms serving two tracks.

Summit, a major node along the line, features two high platforms with the station building located above the tracks and a glass crossover above the platforms. Some weekday local services terminate and originate here. Many private schools are located in Summit, making commuting high school students a major source of traffic for this station. Schedules are timed for most Morristown trains to facilitate a convenient transfer to a Gladstone branch train across the platform.

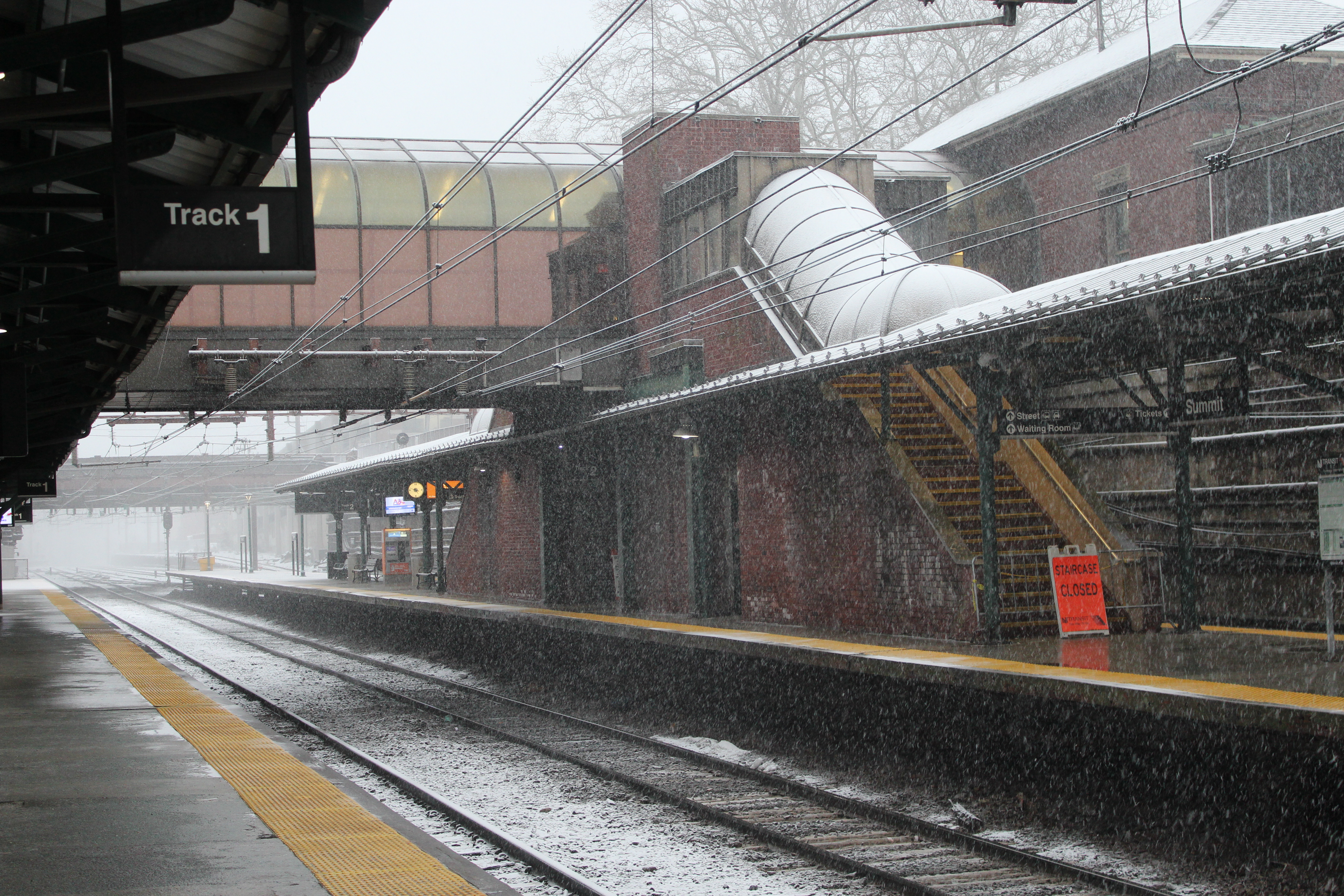
Summit Station track view, a key transfer station between Morristown and Gladstone lines

West of Summit, the Gladstone Branch diverges, and the line crosses the Passaic River for the second time as it enters into Chatham Township. Chatham station is situated on an embankment with two side platforms, while Madison station, on a viaduct, features a recently refurbished 1916 station house on the eastbound side.

The line encounters its first grade crossing at Convent station, located near Saint Elizabeth University. This station has two side platforms, with the main station building on the eastbound side and a brick waiting house on the westbound track. An old freight station is situated on the eastbound side, and two additional grade crossings follow this station.

Upon crossing I-287, the line enters Morristown. The Morristown station has two low side platforms and a large station building that remains open throughout the week. The station is a focal point of a new transit-oriented development, featuring ADA-compliant mini-high platform ramps at both ends. An abandoned freight station is located at the west end. West of the station, the Morristown & Erie Railway's main offices are located, and its main line diverges at this point.

The next station is Morris Plains, featuring a 1915 brick station structure. A local model railroad club occupies the freight house just north of the station. Beyond Morris Plains, the line curves through wooded areas, passing beneath Route 10, and several crossings before reaching Mount Tabor station, a small stop in Denville Township near the community of the same name in Parsippany. This station is served by select weekday and limited weekend services and lacks an eastbound platform.

Denville station lies a short distance from Mount Tabor, where the Morristown Line converges with the Montclair–Boonton Line shortly after this station.

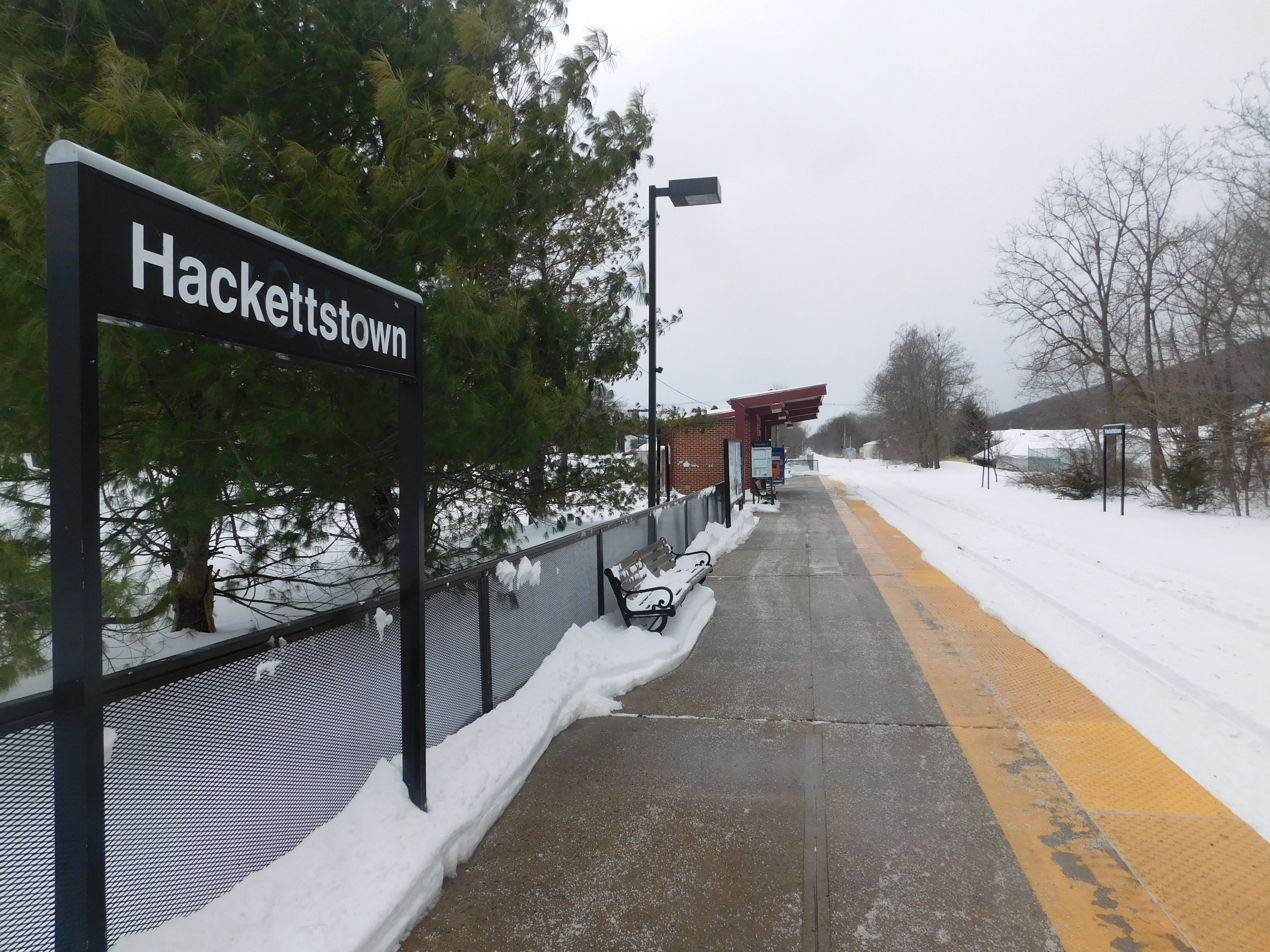
Hackettstown Station, at the end of the line

The line proceeds over Estling Lake and alongside the Rockaway River, entering Dover. Dover station, the terminal stop within the electrified section, features a 1905 station that was recently renovated in the mid-1990s with a single high platform. Due to the cessation of electric traction infrastructure near this location, most NJ Transit services terminate here. As of 2022, all Midtown Direct Morristown Line services are exclusively electric, although future acquisitions of dual-mode locomotives by NJ Transit could alter this service configuration. Most Hoboken services on the Morristown Line are also electric, offering superior efficiency and performance, with only a few diesel-powered Hoboken services extending westward to Hackettstown. The Morristown Line's catenary wires end approximately half a mile west of Dover station near the U.S. Route 46 (US 46) overpass. There are unfunded plans to extend electric service to Lake Hopatcong, as the Dover Yard is at capacity and Wharton's substation has been operational since 1984.

Continuing westward, two tracks extend over the Rockaway River, passing D&R Junction in Wharton, where the Dover-Rockaway Branch of Morris County diverges. Chester Junction, located on the left, provides a connection to the Chester and High Bridge Branch of Morris County. Mount Arlington park-and-ride station follows, with dual high platforms and 285 parking spaces near Exit 30 on Interstate 80 (I-80). After passing beneath I-80, Lake Hopatcong station is next. The Lackawanna Cutoff connects on the right as the train approaches Port Morris Yard, which houses the diesel fleet serving both the Montclair–Boonton and Morristown lines. Netcong station has a brick station building on the low platform and served as the line's endpoint until late 1994. Crossing beneath I-80 again, the line enters the Mount Olive International Trade Center, where a station is positioned at Waterloo Valley Road.

The route traverses Allamuchy Mountain State Park and runs along the Musconetcong River en route to Hackettstown. A freight spur serving the M&M/Mars is located on the right before the line crosses US 46 in downtown. Hackettstown station is located shortly thereafter, featuring a single low platform with a mini-high ADA ramp. The track beyond Hackettstown falls under the ownership of Norfolk Southern Railway and is operated by the Dover & Delaware River Railroad as part of the Washington Secondary extending to Phillipsburg.

Historically, the Morristown Line constituted the main line of the Delaware, Lackawanna & Western Railroad. Until 1970, passenger services extended beyond Lake Hopatcong, reaching the Pocono Mountains, Scranton, Pennsylvania, Binghamton, New York, and Buffalo, New York, via the Lackawanna Cut-Off. Service along the Cut-Off to Andover is anticipated to recommence post-2025, with the completion of the first phase of the Lackawanna Cut-Off Restoration Project. Future plans contemplate extending rail services into northeastern Pennsylvania, potentially reaching as far as Scranton.

== Electrification ==
The Morristown Line east of Dover station is electrified, using 25 kV, 60 Hz AC overhead catenary wire. The line was electrified in 1930 at 3 kV DC, but was re-electrified in 1984 at the contemporary standard of 25 kV, 60 Hz. The connecting Gladstone Branch and Montclair Branch were also re-electrified at this time.

== Stations ==
State	Zone	Location	Station	Miles (km)	Date opened	Date closed	Connections / notes
NY	1	Manhattan	Pennsylvania Station	0.0 (0.0)	1910		Amtrak (long distance): Cardinal, Crescent, Lake Shore Limited, Palmetto, Silver Meteor; Amtrak (intercity): Acela, Adirondack, Carolinian, Empire Service, Ethan Allen Express, Keystone Service, Maple Leaf, Northeast Regional, Pennsylvanian, Vermonter; Long Island Rail Road: Babylon, Belmont Park, City Terminal Zone, Far Rockaway, Hempstead, Long Beach, Montauk, Oyster Bay, Port Jefferson, Port Washington, Ronkonkoma, West Hempstead branches NJ Transit Rail: Gladstone, Montclair–Boonton, Northeast Corridor, Raritan Valley, North Jersey Coast lines New York City Subway: 1, 2, and 3 (at 34th Street – Penn Station (Seventh Avenue)), A, C, and E (at 34th Street – Penn Station (Eighth Avenue)); New York City Bus: M7, M20, M34 SBS, M34A, Q32; Academy Bus: SIM23, SIM24; Flixbus: Eastern Shuttle; Vamoose Bus
NJ	1	Secaucus	Secaucus Junction	3.5 (5.6)	2003		NJ Transit Rail: Bergen County, Gladstone, Main, Meadowlands, Montclair–Boonton, Northeast Corridor, Pascack Valley, Raritan Valley, and North Jersey Coast lines Metro-North Railroad: Port Jervis Line; NJ Transit Bus: 2, 78, 129, 329, 353
NJ	1	Hoboken	Hoboken Terminal	–	1903		NJ Transit Rail: Bergen County, Gladstone, Main, Meadowlands, Montclair–Boonton, Pascack Valley, and Raritan Valley lines Metro-North Railroad: Port Jervis Line; Hudson-Bergen Light Rail: 8th Street-Hoboken, Hoboken-Tonnelle; PATH: HOB-WTC, HOB-33, JSQ-33 (via HOB); NJ Transit Bus: 22, 22X, 23, 68, 85, 87, 89, 126; New York Waterway
NJ	2						
NJ	2	Harrison	Harrison	7.13 (11.5)		September 16, 1984	
NJ	2	Newark	Newark Broad Street	10.4 (16.7)	November 19, 1836		NJ Transit Rail: Montclair–Boonton Line and Gladstone Branch; Newark Light Rail: Broad Street – Newark Penn; NJ Transit Bus: 11, 13, 27, 28, go28, 29, 30, 41, 72, 76, 78, 108
NJ	4	Newark					
NJ	4	Newark	Roseville Avenue	11.6 (18.7)		September 16, 1984	
NJ	4	East Orange					
NJ	4	East Orange	Grove Street	12.2 (19.6)		April 7, 1991	
NJ	4	East Orange	East Orange	12.6 (20.3)	November 19, 1836		NJ Transit Rail: Gladstone Branch; NJ Transit Bus: 21, 71, 73, 79, 94; Community Coach: 77
NJ	4	East Orange	Brick Church	13.2 (21.2)	November 19, 1836		NJ Transit Rail: Gladstone Branch; NJ Transit Bus: 21, 24, 71, 73, 79, 94, 97; Community Coach: 77
NJ	4	Orange	Orange	14.1 (22.7)	November 19, 1836		NJ Transit Rail: Gladstone Branch; NJ Transit Bus: 21, 24, 41, 44, 71, 73, 92; Community Coach: 77; West Orange Community Shuttle
NJ	5	Orange	Highland Avenue	14.8 (23.8)			NJ Transit Rail: Gladstone Branch; NJ Transit Bus: 44, 92
NJ	5	South Orange	Mountain Station	15.7 (25.3)			NJ Transit Rail: Gladstone Branch; NJ Transit Bus: 92
NJ	5	South Orange	South Orange	16.5 (26.6)	September 17, 1837		NJ Transit Rail: Gladstone Branch; NJ Transit Bus: 31, 92, 107; South Orange Community Shuttle; West Orange Community Shuttle
NJ	6	Maplewood	Maplewood	17.8 (28.6)	September 17, 1837		NJ Transit Rail: Gladstone Branch; Maplewood Community Shuttle
NJ	6		Wyoming			November 10, 1907	
NJ	7	Millburn	Millburn	19.4 (32.2)	September 17, 1837		NJ Transit Rail: Gladstone Branch; NJ Transit Bus: 70
NJ	7	Short Hills	Short Hills	20.4 (32.8)	July 1879		NJ Transit Rail: Gladstone Branch; Springfield Community Shuttle
NJ	9	Summit	Summit	22.7 (36.5)	September 17, 1837		NJ Transit Rail: Gladstone Branch; NJ Transit Bus: 70, 986; Lakeland Bus: 78
NJ	10	Chatham	Chatham	26.1 (42.0)	September 17, 1837		NJ Transit Bus: 873
NJ	11	Madison	Madison	28.1 (45.2)	September 17, 1837		NJ Transit Bus: 873
NJ	12	Convent Station	Convent Station	30.3 (48.8)	1867		NJ Transit Bus: 873, 878, 879
NJ	14	Morristown	Morristown	32.5 (52.0)	January 1, 1838		NJ Transit Bus: 871, 872, 873, 874, 880; Community Coach: 77
NJ	16	Morris Plains	Morris Plains	34.6 (55.7)	July 4, 1848		NJ Transit Bus: 872, 880
NJ	16	Mount Tabor	Mount Tabor	38.3 (61.6)			NJ Transit Bus: 880
NJ	16	Denville	Denville	39.3 (63.2)	July 4, 1848		NJ Transit Rail: Montclair–Boonton Line; NJ Transit Bus: 880
NJ	17	Dover	Dover	43.1 (69.4)	July 31, 1848		NJ Transit Rail: Montclair–Boonton Line; NJ Transit Bus: 872, 875, 880 Terminus of electrification, transfer point between trains to New York/Hoboken and Dover
NJ	19						
NJ	19	Wharton	Wharton			January 6, 1958	
NJ	19	Mount Arlington	Mount Arlington (limited service)		January 16, 1854 January 21, 2008	November 8, 1942	NJ Transit Rail: Montclair–Boonton Line; Lakeland Bus: 80 Also known as Howard Boulevard Park and Ride
NJ	19	Roxbury	Lake Hopatcong (limited service)	48.5 (78.1)	1882		NJ Transit Rail: Montclair–Boonton Line; Lakeland Bus: 80
NJ	19	Roxbury	Port Morris			April 24, 1949	Passenger service ended on April 24, 1949, but the site continued to serve as split of the Lackawanna Cut-Off.
NJ	19	Netcong	Netcong (limited service)	51.0 (82.1)	January 16, 1854		NJ Transit Rail: Montclair–Boonton Line Former western terminus, originally Netcong-Stanhope
NJ	19	Mount Olive	Mount Olive (limited service)	52.7 (84.8)	January 16, 1854 October 31, 1994	April 24, 1960	NJ Transit Rail: Montclair–Boonton Line Originally Waterloo
NJ	19	Hackettstown	Hackettstown (limited service)	60.0 (96.6)	January 16, 1854 October 31, 1994	September 30, 1966	NJ Transit Rail: Montclair–Boonton Line

== Bibliography ==
- Douglass, A.M. (1912). The Railroad Trainman, Volume 29. Cleveland, Ohio: Brotherhood of Railroad Trainmen.
- New Jersey Comptroller of the Treasury (1856). Annual Statements of the Railroad and Canal Companies of the State of New Jersey. Trenton, New Jersey: Office of "True American".
- Order of Railway Conductors and Brakemen (1913). The Conductor and Brakeman, Volume 30. Cedar Rapids, Iowa: Order of Railway Conductors and Brakemen.
- Platt, Charles Davis (1922). Dover Dates, 1722-1922: A Bicentennial History of Dover, New Jersey, Published in Connection with Dover's Two Hundredth Anniversary Celebration Under the Direction of the Dover Fire Department, August 9, 10, 11, 1922. Dover, New Jersey: Charles Davis Platt.
- Stern, Robert A.M.; Fishman, David; Tilove, Jacob (2013). Paradise Planned: The Garden Suburb and the Modern City. New York, New York: The Monacelli Press. ISBN 9781580933261.
