= Madison station (NJ Transit) =

NJ Transit rail station

Madison
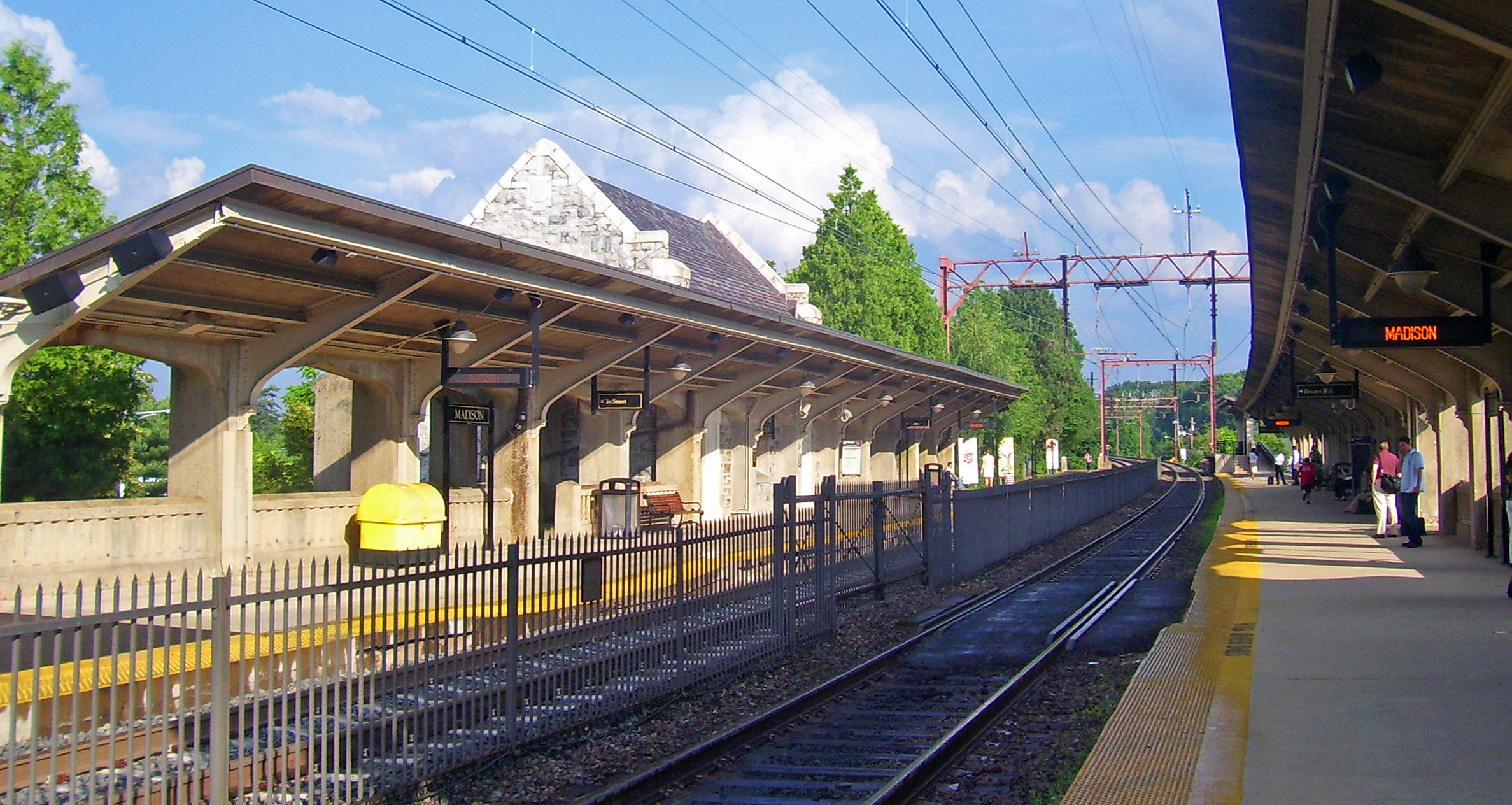
- Madison station in Madison, New Jersey

General information
- Location: 47 Kings Road, Madison, New Jersey, U.S.
- Owner: NJ Transit
- Platforms: 2 side platforms
- Tracks: 2
- Connections: NJ Transit Bus: 873

Construction
- Parking: 413 spaces (10 accessible)
- Accessible: yes

Other information
- Station code: 426 (Delaware, Lackawanna and Western)
- Fare zone: 11

History
- Opened: September 17, 1837 (preliminary trip); September 28, 1837 (regular service)
- Rebuilt: January 1, 1879; January 1915–April 17, 1916
- Electrified: December 18, 1930

Key dates
- April 1915: 1879 depot razed

Passengers
- 2025: 917 (average weekday)
- Rank: 33 of 153

Services
Preceding station	NJ Transit	Following station
Convent Station toward Hackettstown	Morristown Line	Chatham toward New York or Hoboken
Former services
Preceding station	Delaware, Lackawanna and Western Railroad	Following station
Convent toward Buffalo	Main Line	Chatham toward Hoboken
- Madison Station
- U.S. National Register of Historic Places
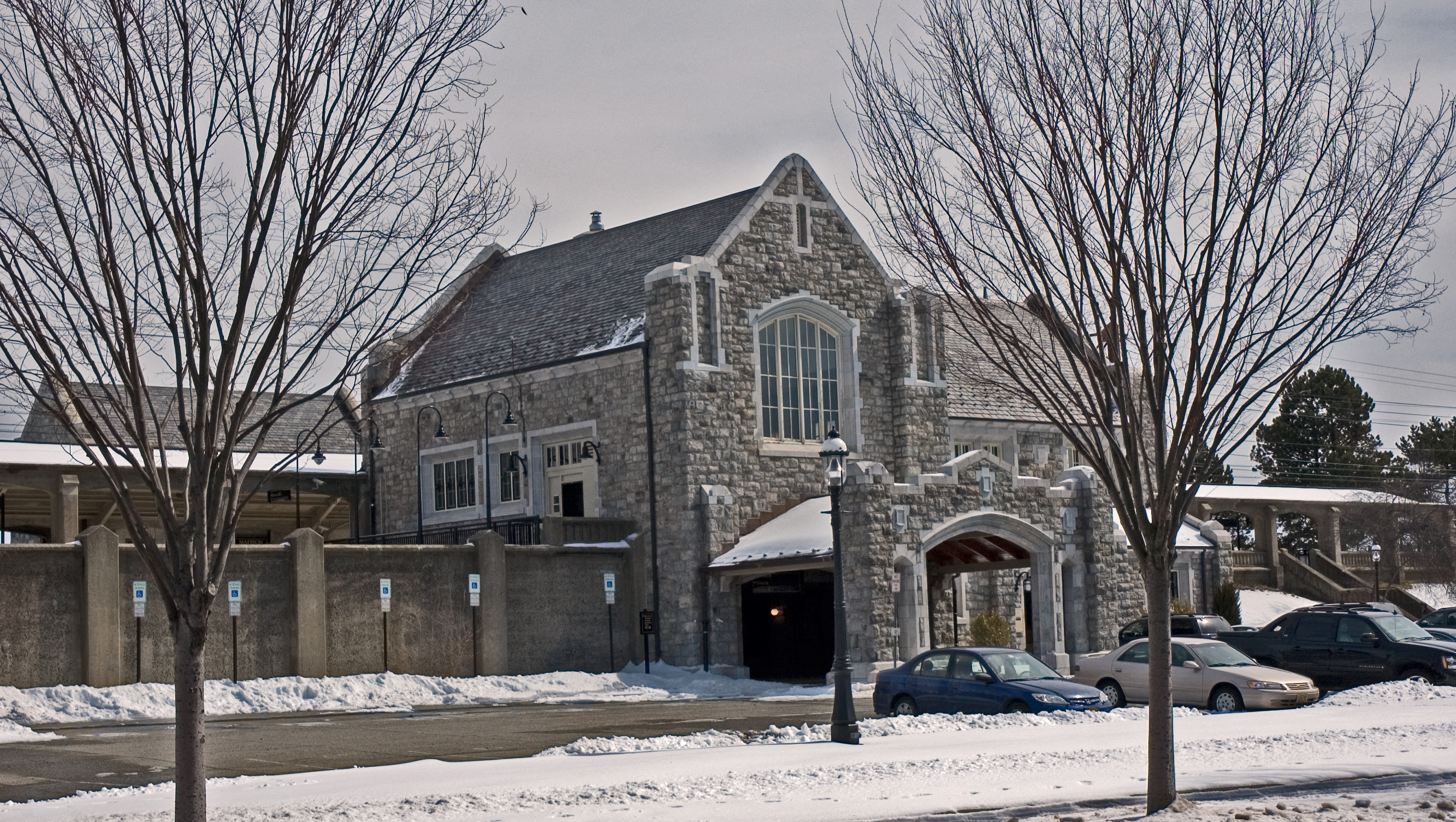
- Madison station's southern side in 2007
- Location: Madison, New Jersey, U.S.
- Coordinates: 40°45′25.3″N 74°24′54.7″W
- Built: 1916
- Architect: Frank J. Nies
- Architectural style: Collegiate Gothic
- NRHP reference No.: 84002764
Location

Madison station is a NJ Transit station in Madison, New Jersey. It is located on the Morristown Line.

In 1984, the station was listed in the New Jersey Register of Historic Places and National Register of Historic Places as part of the Operating Passenger Railroad Stations Thematic Resource.

The station was built in 1916 after the local government passed an ordinance for $159,000 (equivalent to $3,157,000 in 2024) with the cooperation of the Delaware, Lackawanna and Western Railroad in the planning of the depot. Much of the road grading caused by the track elevation was funded by private contributions.

== History ==
=== 19th century ===
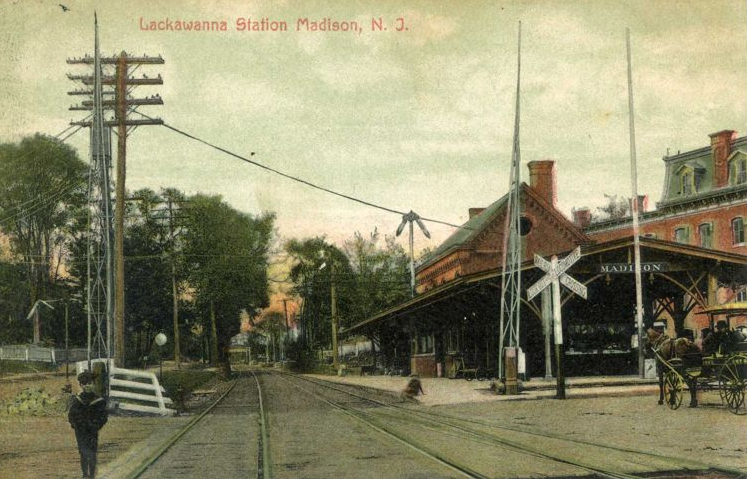
Madison station before the track elevation

The rail line that currently runs through Madison, New Jersey was founded in 1835 with the Morris and Essex Railroad charter, which was approved by the New Jersey State Legislature on January 29. As part of an agreement during the surveying process, the Morris and Essex was required to stop all trains in Madison. The agreement was finalized in January 1836 by the local Presbyterian Church on a hill near present-day Kings Road. The service ran from Newark to nearby Morristown, and Madison was one of only three regular stops along with the stops at Orange station and Millburn station. On September 17, 1837, the first passenger train began at the station. run by horses. The two horse-drawn rail car would serve 30 people for several months, soon replaced by a locomotive known as the "Orange", built by Seth Boyden.

Madison station was initially a local shack that was used for railroad services near a turntable. Despite having a standing station in Madison, passengers were allowed to use a white handkerchief to flag down the train for a stop. The station also served as the temporary terminus of the Morris and Essex, since the line to Morristown was not completed until January 1, 1838.

In September 1843, local Madison residents obtained authorization for the construction of a new station at the site of the present-day intersection of Waverly Place and Kings Road. By 1860, an upgrade was needed once again when Samuel Tuttle, the pastor at Madison Presbyterian Church and Lathrop had the Lackawanna expand facilities at Madison. Upgrading the station required moving it to Madison's municipal hall. The railroad and Madison shared the entire $12,000 (equivalent to $341,000 in 2024) relocation cost.

In 1861, the railroad track through Madison was upgraded from older wooden ties to stronger ones built for better equipment. Construction of a second track in Madison began in 1867. In December 1868, the Delaware, Lackawanna and Western Railroad took control of the Morris and Essex Railroad, which was struggling financially.

=== 1877 fire ===
Madison station depot and several neighboring facilities were damaged in an October 21, 1877 fire, which broke out in the feed room of a local grocery store on Waverly Place. After someone busted open a door to get to the fire, the winds soon engulfed the grocery and other nearby buildings, including the local YMCA and the house of G.W. Squier, a local resident. Another local resident, along with a cigar store, were also claimed in the fire. After the fire consumed Squier's house, the flames moved to the railroad station in under ten minutes. All the tickets and baggage within the depot were saved from the flames. However, the station was a total loss. The debris from the ruined Madison station were removed on October 22. Plans for a new station were being formulated by October 27.

Frustration began to develop in Madison by January 1878 about the lack of construction of a new depot. In the meantime, baggage and ticket services at Madison were being dealt with across the tracks, resulting in people having to cross the tracks, a dangerous proposition. Frustration manifested through February and into March, A pile of stones came to the site of the burned out depot by early March 1878, however locals believed the railroad was not going to begin construction any time soon. However, by March 16, lime had arrived for the preparation of construction of a new depot, which would begin within the next week. A local citizen of prominence contacted Lackawanna, demanding a depot be put up soon or at least a structure for reasonable service. The platform was flagged for construction in November 1878 and completed on January 1, 1879.

=== 20th century ===
The Lackawanna wired the depot for electricity in March 1903.

In August 1913, the Lackawanna Railroad bought up around $250,000 (equivalent to $5,820,000 in 2024) worth of local property between Chatham and Madison. The land, which totaled 1149 acres (60 ha), along with a full house, was purchased through Alexander Eagle's local firm. The Madison Eagle speculated that the buyouts were for the straightening of railroad tracks between Madison and Chatham. The real estate agency noted that the railroad had been quietly purchasing land rather than doing it so publicly. A survey done several years prior noted that one lot, which took up 65 acres (26 ha), would result in several rooms of the owner's house being removed.

In December 1913, George J. Ray, the chief engineer of the Lackawanna Railroad attended a meeting of the Madison borough council. The engineer explained to the borough about how each phase of the track elevation would go. A new railroad station would be built on the southern side of the tracks at the intersection of Green and Maple Avenues. A park would surround part of the station. The new station would have reasonable parkway space and approaches from Waverly Place, Green and Maple Avenues and Prospect Street. The project would include beautification of local lawns near the depot. A tunnel would connect each side of the tracks, which including a waiting room on the northern side of the tracks. The southern side would across include a baggage and express carriageway for travelers.

Under this design, the railroad grade crossings at Union, Samson and Madison Avenues, Kings and Green Village Roads, Prospect and Elm Streets, along with Waverly Place would become underpasses for the road to cross under the tracks. Division Street and Ridgedale Avenue would have their crossings abandoned rather than replaced, and Prospect Street would be widened from the station to Main Street. Prospect Street would have sidewalks 60 feet (18 m) long under the overpass. Kings Road would be closed across the tracks, but the local sidewalks would remain open. Woodland Avenue would be extended by the railroad from Division Avenue to Lafayette Avenue in Chatham. Union Avenue would get a 50-by-34-foot (15 m × 10 m) with two sidewalks. The rest of the roads were to cross the tracks with steel girder bridges.

Ridgedale Avenue's closing was met with opposition by the mayor-elect of Madison, Benyew D. Philhower. Philhower lived near the crossing and felt that if Ridgedale was closed, there would be no crossing between Madison and Elm. Ray disputed that Ridgedale was studied and that less than 300 vehicles used the crossing, which would have been an 11 percent grade going on an overpass and 10 percent in an underpass. This would cause problems with the Ridgedale and Madison junction nearby and add $100,000 to the $1 million cost of the project.

Talks between the borough of Madison and the Lackawanna Railroad broke down late in December 1913. Despite the railroad offering extra concessions on the Madison station depot (concrete ballast floors on all bridges and concreting the Waverly Place and Green Village Road crossings). The railroad would also provide drainage and sewers at Prospect Street and Green Avenue along with some property on Kings Road. President of the Lackawanna Railroad, William Truesdale offered these changes only if the borough accepted them after complaints. However, this was turned down by the borough. The negotiations came to a close.

The new station was under construction by early 1916.

== Station layout and services ==
Madison station is a two-track railroad station along New Jersey Transit's Morristown Line, a part of the Morris and Essex Lines. The station is two-levels with two low-level side platforms that include mini-high-level platforms. There are two ticket vending machines in the walkway tunnel under the platforms. The station also has a part-time ticket office, open only from 5:30 am to 9:00 am on Monday through Friday and closed entirely on weekends. Madison has three parking lots, all on Kings Road and Prospect Street, including 413 parking spaces. Of these, ten are accessible for handicapped persons in compliance with the Americans with Disabilities Act of 1990. Two lots offer daily parking, and all three have permit-only parking run by the borough of Madison. The station also has bicycle racks and lockers. The station is in fare zone 11.

NJ Transit manages a bus connection at Madison station, the 873, which runs six days a week (excluding Sunday) from Parsippany–Troy Hills to Livingston. A private bus connection operated by Boxcar Transit runs weekdays from Madison station to and from Midtown Manhattan.

== See also ==
- List of New Jersey Transit stations
- National Register of Historic Places listings in Morris County, New Jersey

== Bibliography ==
- Order of Railway Conductors and Brakemen (1913). The Conductor and Brakeman, Volume 30. Cedar Rapids, Iowa: Order of Railway Conductors and Brakemen.
- New Jersey State Board of Assessors (1888). Annual Report of the State Board of Assessors of the State of New Jersey,1887 Volumes 4-5. Camden, New Jersey: S. Chew, Printer.
- Taber, Thomas Townsend; Taber, Thomas Townsend III (1980). The Delaware, Lackawanna & Western Railroad in the Twentieth Century. Vol. 1. Muncy, PA: Privately printed. ISBN 0-9603398-2-5.
- Tuttle, Samuel L. (1855). A History of the Presbyterian Church, Madison, N.J.: A Discourse, Delivered on Thanksgiving Day, November 23, 1854. New York, New York: M.W. Dodd. p. 1.
- Walker, Herbert T. (1902). "Early History of the Delaware, Lackawanna & Western Railroad and it's Locomotives - Part 2: The Morris and Essex Railroad". Railroad Gazette. 34.
