= Highland Avenue station (NJ Transit) =

NJ Transit rail station

Highland Avenue
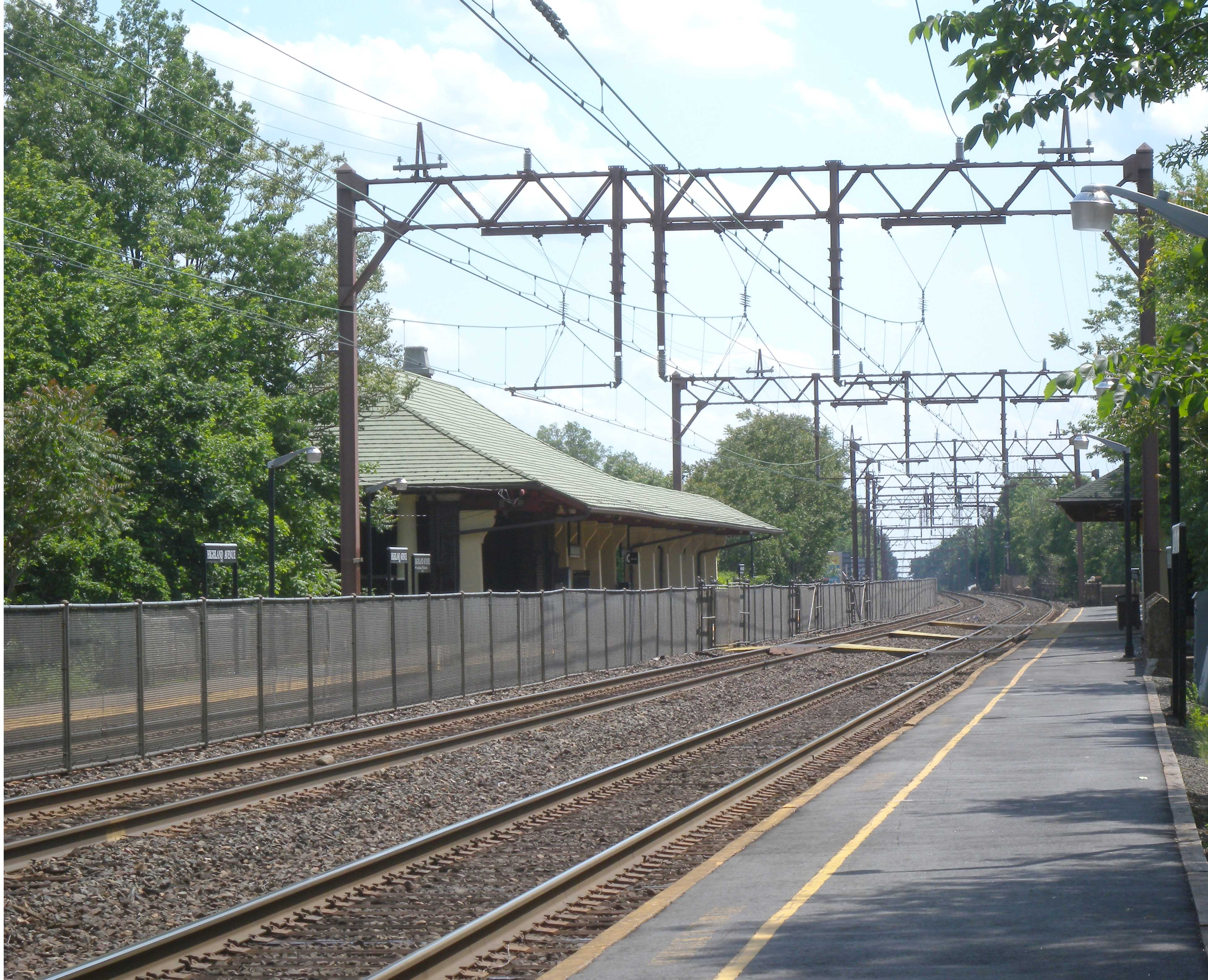
- Highland Avenue Station in 2009

General information
- Location: Scotland Road & Highland Avenue; Orange, New Jersey
- Coordinates: 40°45′56″N 74°14′42″W
- Owner: New Jersey Transit
- Platforms: 2 side platforms
- Tracks: 3
- Connections: NJT Bus: 44, 92

Other information
- Fare zone: 5

History
- Rebuilt: 1905, 1916–1918
- Electrified: September 22, 1930
- Former names: Orange Valley (1858–1890)

Passengers
- 2025: 228 (average weekday)
- Rank: 95 of 153

Services
Preceding station	NJ Transit	Following station
Mountain Station toward Gladstone	Gladstone Branch weekdays	Orange toward New York or Hoboken
Mountain Station toward Hackettstown	Morristown Line	Orange toward New York or Hoboken
Former services
Preceding station	Delaware, Lackawanna and Western Railroad	Following station
Mountain Station toward Buffalo	Main Line	Orange toward Hoboken
Location

Highland Avenue is an active commuter railroad station in Orange, New Jersey. One of two in the city, along with the eponymous Orange station, Highland Avenue is serviced by trains of New Jersey Transit's Morris and Essex Lines: the Morristown Line and Gladstone Branch. Trains through the station run between New York Penn Station and Hoboken Terminal to the east and Hackettstown and Gladstone. The station contains two low-level side platforms for the three tracks that run through the station.

The station opened as Orange Valley as a stop on the Morris and Essex Railroad, using that name until 1890.

== Station layout ==
The station has two low-level side platforms serving the outer tracks. The north platform has a walkway over the Track 3 to access Track 1, though trains on Track 1 do not typically stop at this station and is instead used as an express track.
