= Brick Church station =

NJ Transit rail station

Brick Church
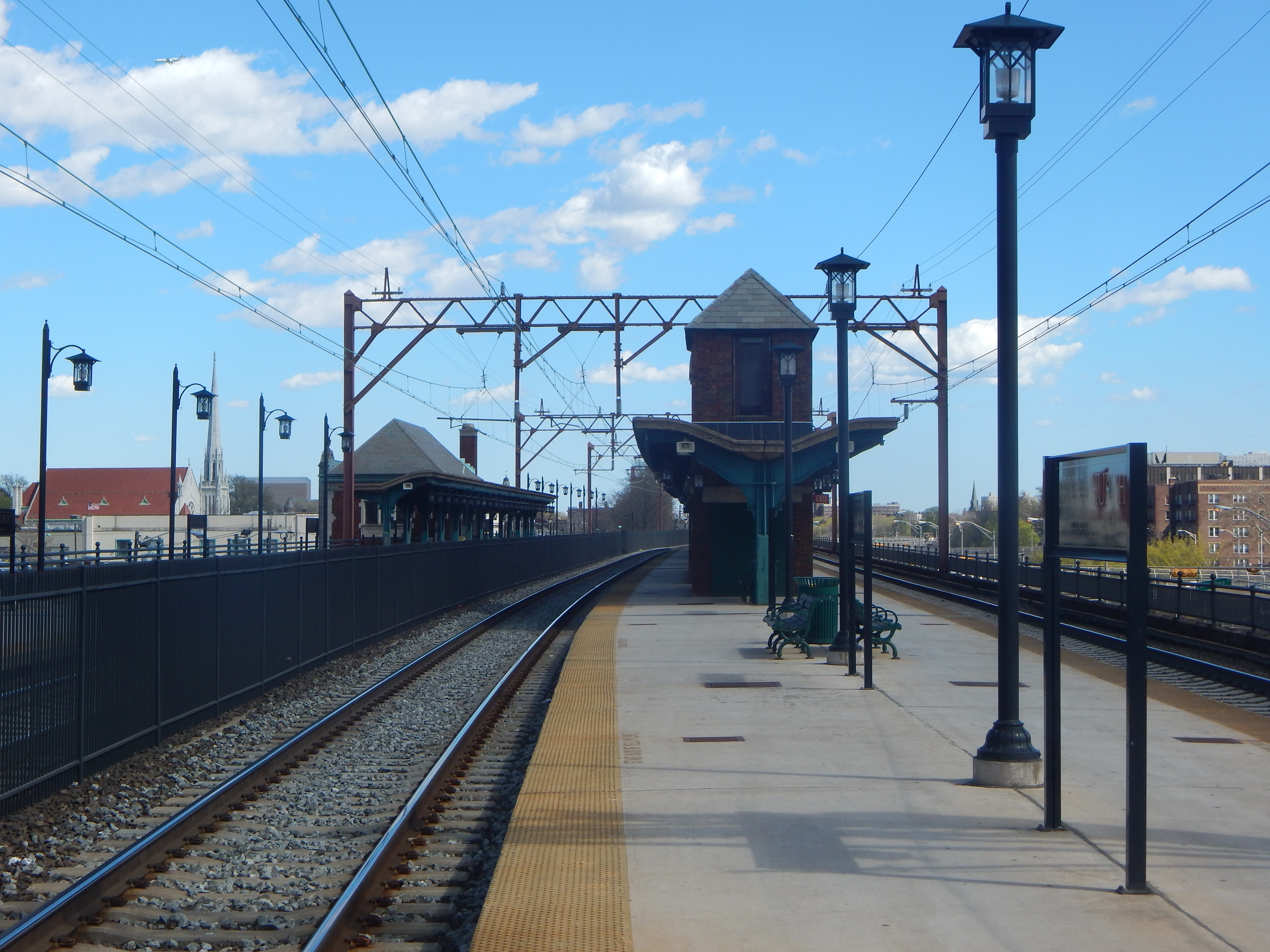
- Looking east toward downtown East Orange

General information
- Platforms: 1 side platform and 1 island platform
- Tracks: 3
- Connections: NJ Transit Bus: 21, 24, 71, 73, 79, 94, 97; Community Coach: 77

Other information
- Fare zone: 4

History
- Opened: November 19, 1836
- Rebuilt: December 1880; April 21, 1921–December 18, 1922
- Electrified: September 22, 1930

Passengers
- 2025: 2,008 (average weekday)
- Rank: 17 of 153

Services
Preceding station	NJ Transit	Following station
Orange toward Gladstone	Gladstone Branch weekdays	East Orange toward New York or Hoboken
Orange toward Hackettstown	Morristown Line	East Orange toward New York or Hoboken
Former services
Preceding station	Delaware, Lackawanna and Western Railroad	Following station
Orange toward Buffalo	Main Line	East Orange toward Hoboken
- Brick Church Station
- U.S. National Register of Historic Places
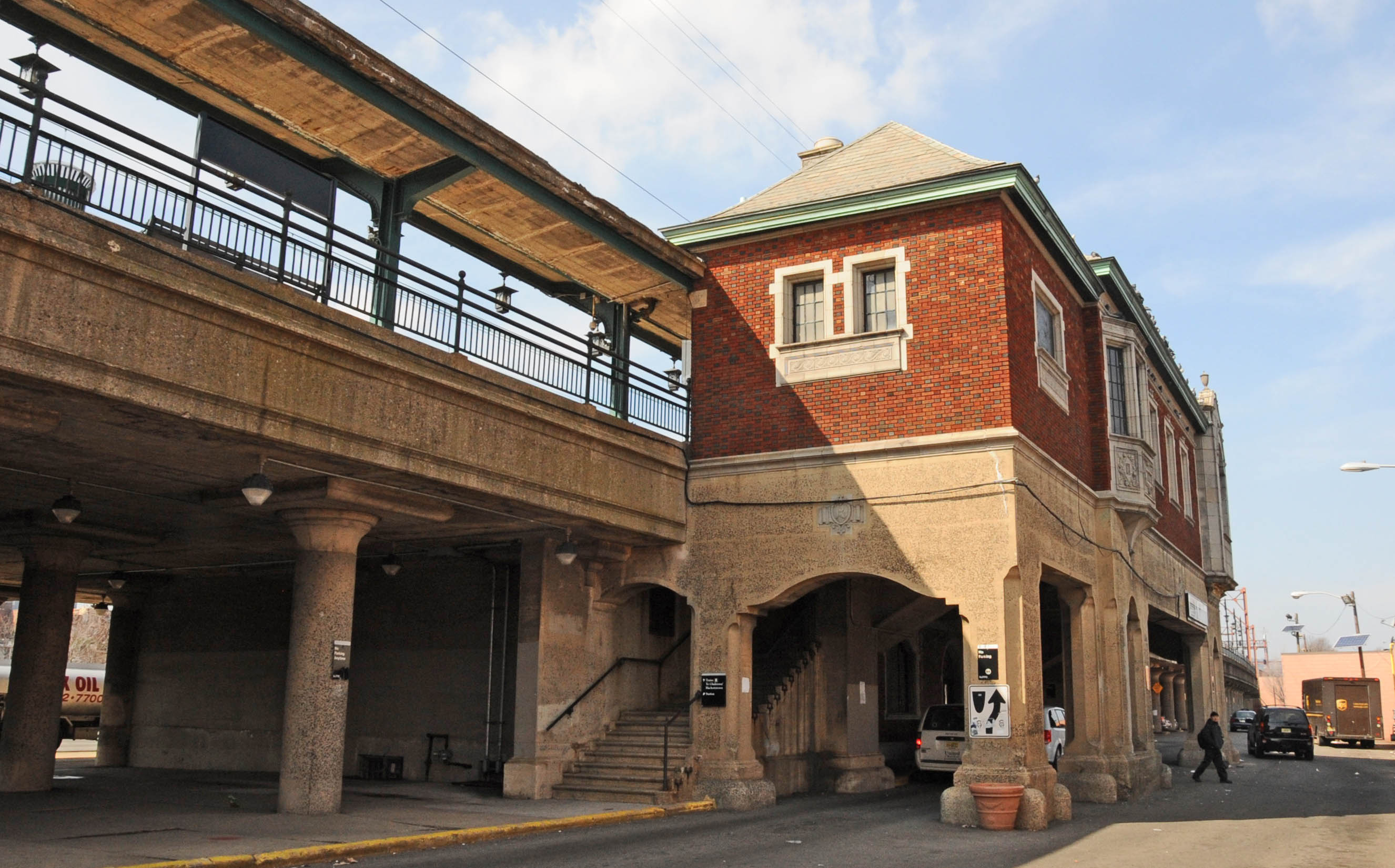
- Location: Brick Church Plaza, East Orange, New Jersey
- Coordinates: 40°45′56″N 74°13′10″W
- Area: 2 acres (0.8 ha)
- Built: 1921
- Architects: Nies, F.J.
- Architectural style: Tudor Revival, Jacobethan Revival
- MPS: Operating Passenger Railroad Stations TR
- NRHP reference No.: 84002636
- Added to NRHP: June 22, 1984
Location

Brick Church is an active commuter railroad station in the city of East Orange, Essex County, New Jersey. The station, one of two in East Orange, is located a block away from the former site of the Brick Presbyterian Church (later, Temple for Unified Christians Brick Church), for which the neighborhood takes its name, designed with brick romanesque architecture. The other station, located 0.6 miles (0.97 km) to the east, is the namesake East Orange stop. Trains from the station head east on New Jersey Transit's Morristown Line and Gladstone Branch to New York Penn Station and Hoboken Terminal while westbound trains service stops out to Gladstone and Hackettstown. Like its sister station, Brick Church contains three tracks and two platforms (a side platform and an island platform). However, it is not accessible for the handicapped.

Railroad service through East Orange began with the opening of the Morris and Essex Railroad on November 19, 1836 to Orange. The railroad stopped at the residence of local attorney Matthias Ogden Halsted each day for him to commute. He soon provided a station for commuters to use as well as himself, and hired a family to operate it, without charging the railroad. Locals helped fund and build a new depot in 1880. The current station opened on December 18, 1922 when the railroad tracks through the city were elevated by the Delaware, Lackawanna and Western Railroad. The brick headhouse at Brick Church station were added to the New Jersey and National Registers of Historic Places in 1984 as part of the Operating Passenger Railroad Stations Thematic Resource.

== History ==
The line that currently runs through East Orange began in 1835 with the charter of the Morris and Essex Railroad, being approved by the New Jersey State Legislature on January 29. Service through the city of East Orange began on November 19, 1836 from Newark to The Oranges. With the construction of the railroad, Matthias Ogden Halsted (1792–1866), a local property developer took advantage of the one train a day that went to Newark. The railroad dropped Halsted off at his house and picked him up at his house rather making a trip to a station. Halsted offered at no cost to build a proper station at the site of the Brick Church station, and did so for the railroad.

In May 2024, the Federal Transit Administration awarded NJT $83 million to reconstruct the station for accessibility.

== Station layout ==
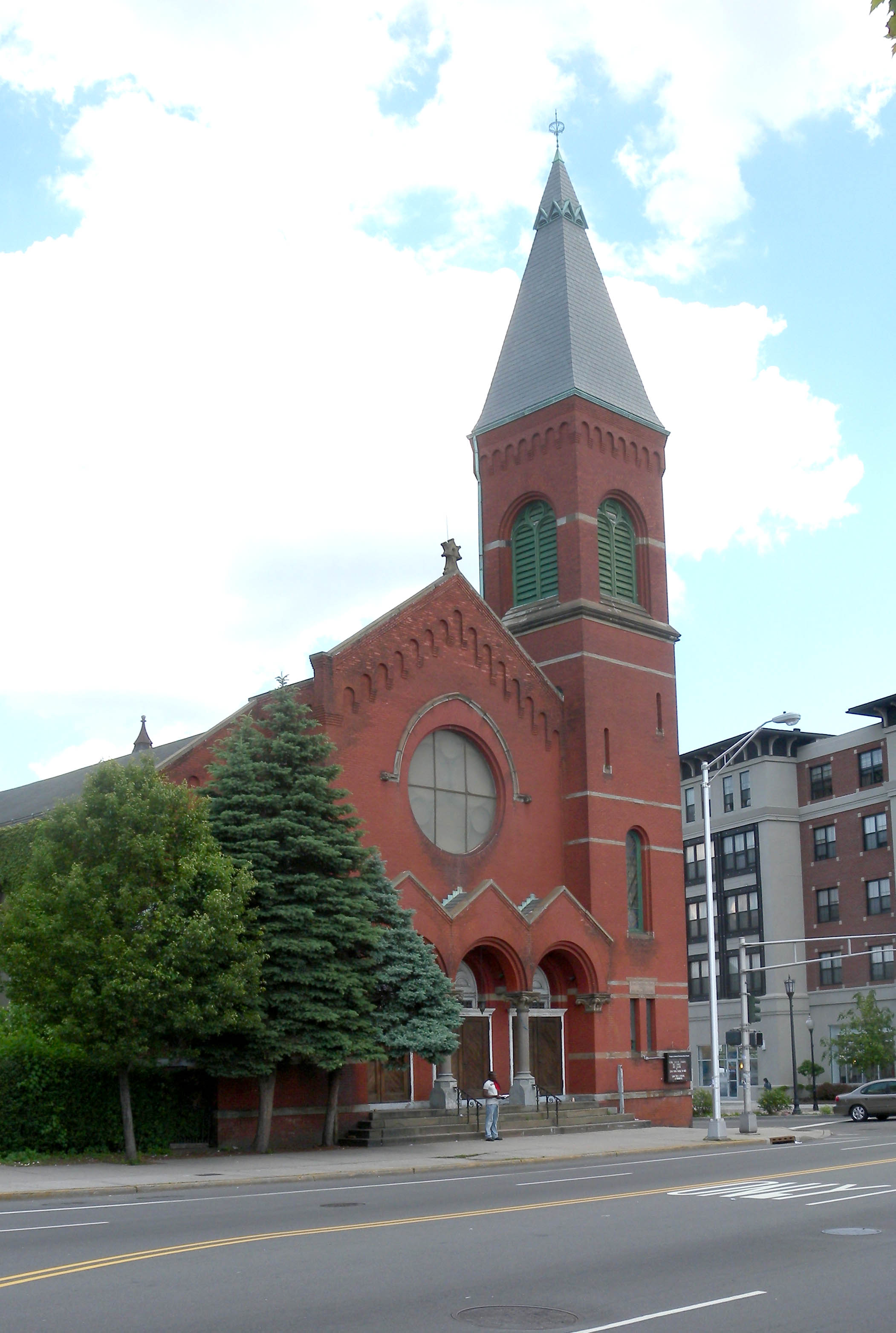
The eponymous church, which was demolished in 2023.

The station has two low-level platforms serving all three tracks.

== See also ==
- List of New Jersey Transit stations
- National Register of Historic Places listings in Essex County, New Jersey

== Bibliography ==
- Douglass, A.M. (1912). The Railroad Trainman, Volume 29. Cleveland, Ohio: Brotherhood of Railroad Trainmen.
- New Jersey State Board of Assessors (1888). Annual Report of the State Board of Assessors of the State of New Jersey, Volumes 4-5. Camden, New Jersey: S. Chew, Printer.
- Taber, Thomas Townsend; Taber, Thomas Townsend III (1980). The Delaware, Lackawanna & Western Railroad in the Twentieth Century. Vol. 1. Muncy, PA: Privately printed. ISBN 0-9603398-2-5.
- Whittemore, Henry (1896). The Founders and Builders of the Oranges. Newark, New Jersey: L.J. Hardham.
