= Convent Station (NJ Transit) =

Rail station in New Jersey, US

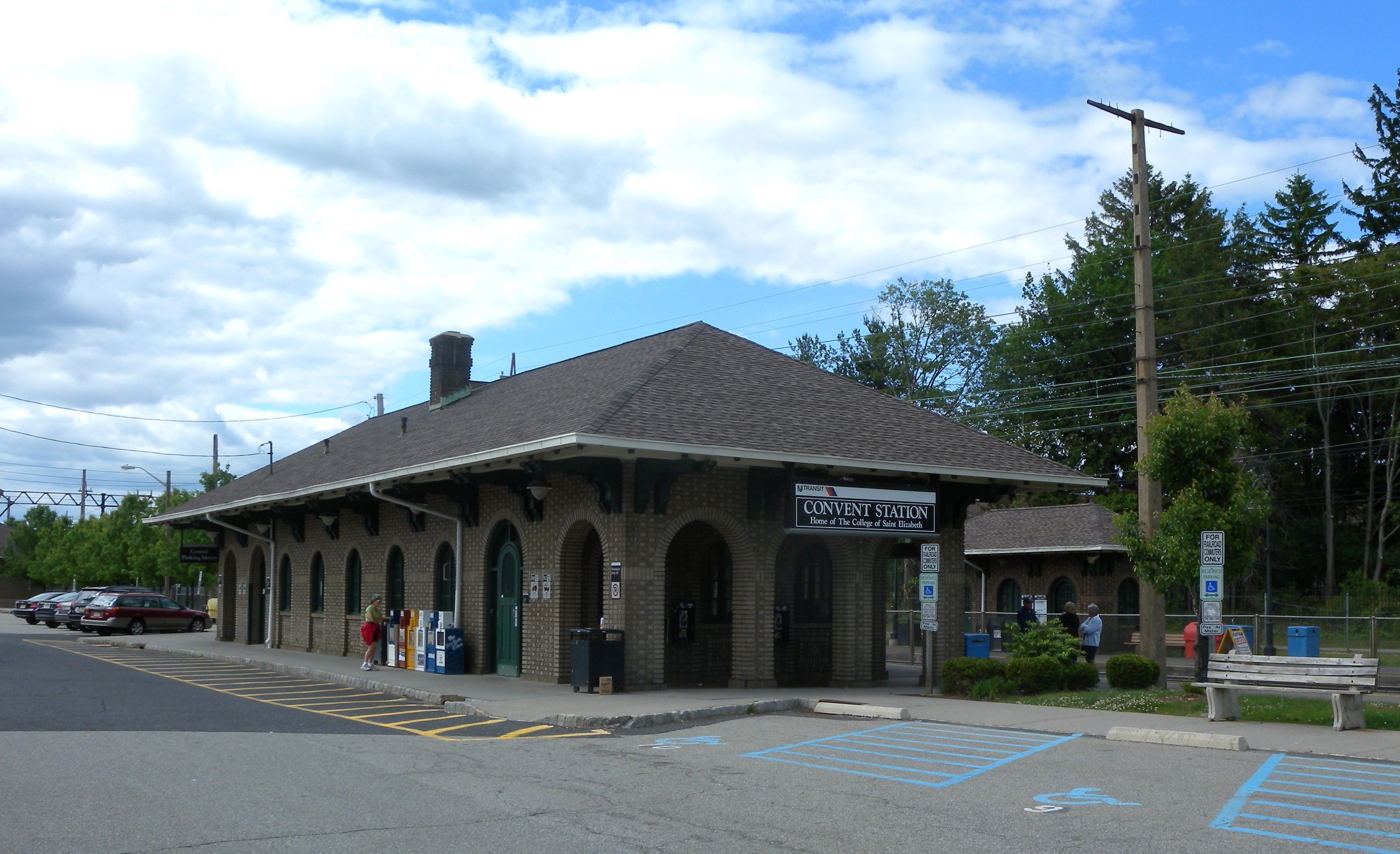
- Convent Station stationhouse

General information
- Location: Convent Road at Old Turnpike Road; Morris Township, New Jersey
- Coordinates: 40°46′44″N 74°26′36″W
- Owner: New Jersey Transit
- Platforms: 2 side platforms
- Tracks: 2
- Connections: NJ Transit Bus: 873, 878

Construction
- Parking: 580 spaces, 9 accessible spaces
- Cycle facilities: Yes
- Accessible: No

Other information
- Station code: 428 (Delaware, Lackawanna and Western)
- Fare zone: 12

History
- Opened: 1867
- Rebuilt: 1913–1914
- Electrified: December 18, 1930

Passengers
- 2025: 583 (average weekday)

Services
Preceding station	NJ Transit	Following station
Morristown toward Hackettstown	Morristown Line	Madison toward New York or Hoboken
Former services
Preceding station	Delaware, Lackawanna and Western Railroad	Following station
Morristown toward Buffalo	Main Line	Madison toward Hoboken
Location

Convent Station is a NJ Transit rail station on the Morristown Line. It is located on the grounds of Saint Elizabeth University in Convent Station, New Jersey.

The station first opened in 1867. A small wooden structure was built in 1876 and called Convent Station. The existing station house, built in 1913–1914, has two side platforms, with the station house on the eastbound platform. A ticket office and waiting room is open weekdays. On the westbound track a brick waiting house stands. A former freight station is on the eastbound side. The main driveway into the college is located at a level crossing at the east end of the platform.

Nearby are several office complexes, including the headquarters of Honeywell to the north and Pfizer at Giralda Farms to the east. The Traction Line Recreation Trail, formerly a line of the Morris County Traction Company, runs along the northeastern side of the line.

== Station layout ==
The station has two tracks, each with a low-level side platform.

== See also ==
- List of NJ Transit railroad stations
- Operating Passenger Railroad Stations Thematic Resource (New Jersey)
