= Orange station (NJ Transit) =

NJ Transit rail station

Orange
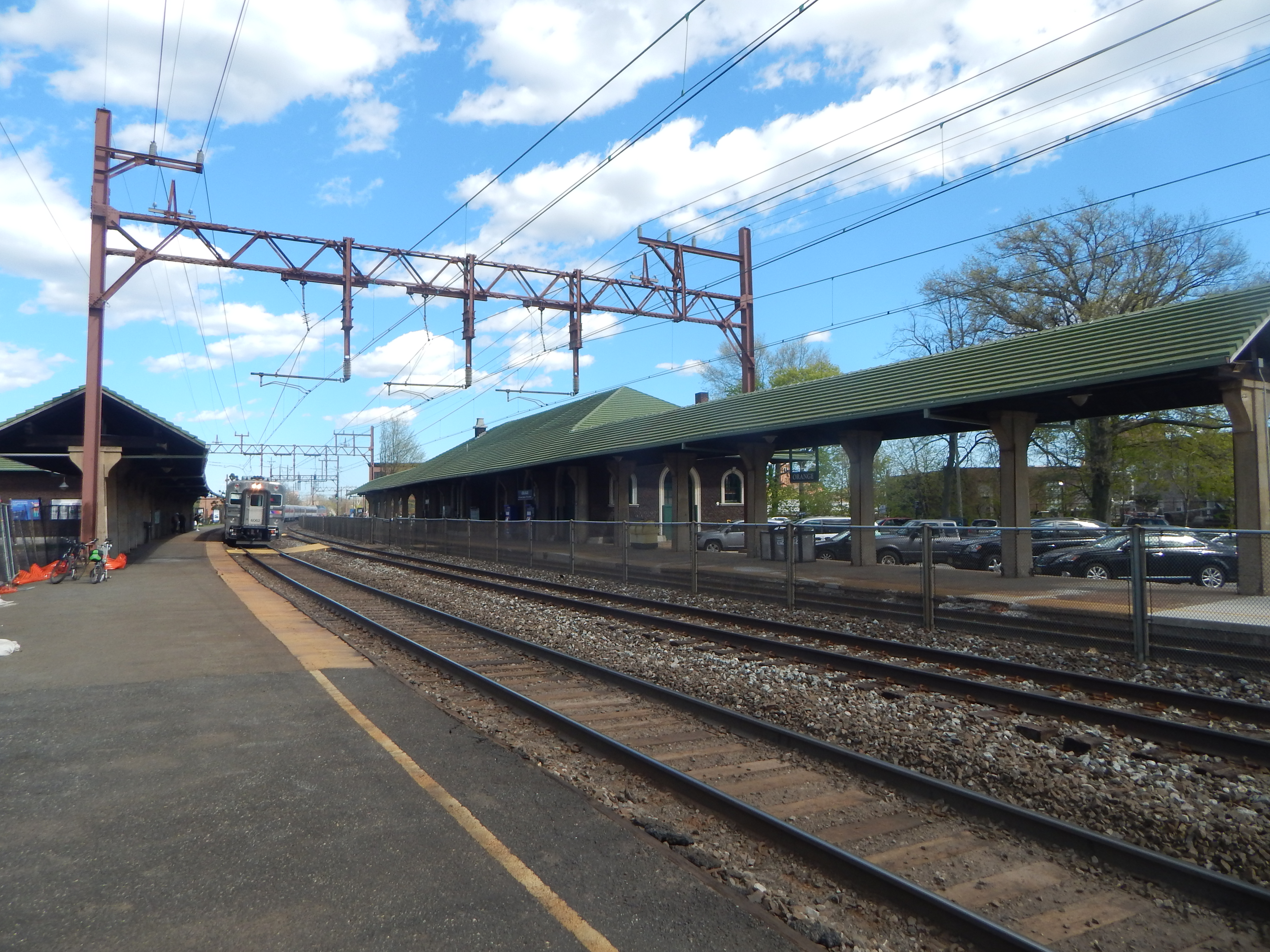
- Dover-bound train approaches, in April 2015

General information
- Location: 52 Lincoln Avenue, Orange, New Jersey
- Owner: New Jersey Transit
- Platforms: 2 side platforms
- Tracks: 3
- Connections: NJT Bus: 21, 24, 41, 44, 71, 73, 79, and 92; Community Coach: 77

Construction
- Cycle facilities: Yes

Other information
- Fare zone: 4

History
- Opened: November 19, 1836
- Electrified: September 22, 1930

Passengers
- 2025: 1,440 (average weekday)
- Rank: 21 of 153

Services
Preceding station	NJ Transit	Following station
Highland Avenue toward Gladstone	Gladstone Branch weekdays	Brick Church toward New York or Hoboken
Highland Avenue toward Hackettstown	Morristown Line	Brick Church toward New York or Hoboken
Former services
Preceding station	Delaware, Lackawanna and Western Railroad	Following station
Highland Avenue toward Buffalo	Main Line	Brick Church toward Hoboken
- Orange Station
- U.S. National Register of Historic Places
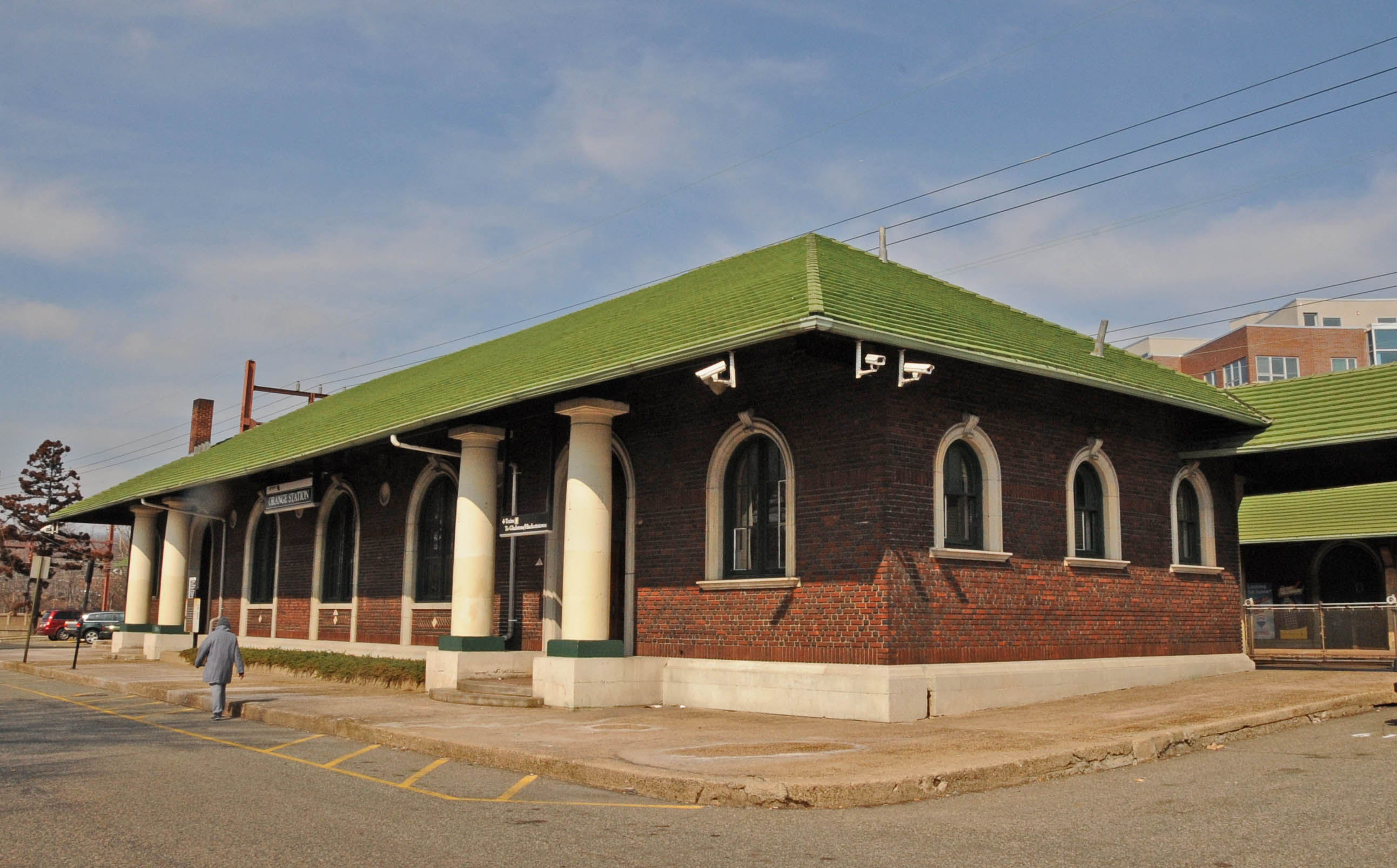
- The station depot at Orange.
- Location: 73 Lincoln Avenue, Orange, New Jersey
- Coordinates: 40°46′18″N 74°14′2″W
- Area: 4.5 acres (1.8 ha)
- Built: 1918
- Architects: Nies, F. J.
- Architectural style: Renaissance
- MPS: Operating Passenger Railroad Stations TR
- NRHP reference No.: 84002665
- Added to NRHP: June 22, 1984
Location

Orange is an active commuter railroad train station in the city of Orange, Essex County, New Jersey. One of two stops in the city (along with Highland Avenue), it is served by New Jersey Transit's Morris and Essex Lines: the Morristown Line to Hackettstown and the Gladstone Branch to Gladstone for trains from New York Penn Station and Hoboken Terminal. Orange station contains two low-level side platforms and three tracks.

Orange station opened on November 19, 1836, with the opening of the Morris and Essex Railroad from Newark to Orange. The station served as the western terminus of the line until September 28, 1837, when the railroad started operations west to Madison station. The current station depots and overhangs were built in 1918 with the elevation of tracks through the city by the Delaware, Lackawanna and Western Railroad. The station depot at Orange station were added to the New Jersey and National Registers of Historic Places in 1984 as part of the Operating Passenger Railroad Stations Thematic Resource.

== History ==
The brick station and nearby freight terminal were built in 1918. The station building has been listed in the state and federal registers of historic places since 1984 and is part of the Operating Passenger Railroad Stations Thematic Resource.

== Station layout ==
Both platforms have walkways over their respective track allowing passengers to access Track 1, though trains on Track 1 do not typically stop at this station.

== See also ==
- List of New Jersey Transit stations
- National Register of Historic Places listings in Essex County, New Jersey

== Bibliography ==
- Douglass, A.M. (1912). The Railroad Trainman, Volume 29. Cleveland, Ohio: Brotherhood of Railroad Trainmen.
- Walker, Herbert T. (1902). "Early History of the Delaware, Lackawanna & Western Railroad and it's Locomotives - Part 2: The Morris and Essex Railroad". Railroad Gazette. 34.
