= Chester Branch (Delaware, Lackawanna and Western Railroad) =

Rail line in New Jersey, United States

The Chester Branch is a rail line formerly extending from Chester Junction, near Dover, New Jersey, about ten miles southwest to the vicinity of Chester, New Jersey. Originally built to connect the iron industry at Chester with the Morris and Essex Railroad, it was always operated by the latter and became, with the rest of the Morris and Essex, a branch of the Delaware, Lackawanna and Western Railroad.

== Origins and construction ==
The Chester Branch originated as the Chester Railroad, chartered on April 2, 1867, to build from the Morris and Essex Railroad at Dover or a point west of there to a point in Chester Township or Washington Township. Most of the nine incorporators were businessmen operating in the vicinity of Chester, the site of extensive iron mining. Daniel Budd was elected president of the new company, and continued in office until his death in June 1873. The railroad was authorized to issue $150,000 of capital stock, but this amount exceeded the resources of local investors. Ultimately, about two-thirds of the stock was paid for by the Morris and Essex. This infusion of funds allowed construction to start; additional provision for fundraising was made by the legislature in March 1868 allowing the Chester Railroad to issue bonds to the amount of $10,000 per mile.

The Morris and Essex leased the Chester Railroad on May 15, 1868; to protect local interests, the lease included a clause that required the consent of minority shareholders to alter or annul it. Construction from Chester Junction to the terminus was complete by the end of 1868. The Chester station was about a mile downhill from the village of Chester, near the banks of the Black River, occasioning some inconvenience to the townspeople. There is some evidence to suggest that Budd had plans to extend the railroad north through Scudder's Gap to Flanders, in Washington Township. He had an interest in the Flanders and German Valley Railroad, which had charter rights to extend to the Central Railroad of New Jersey near Hampton. However, no construction was ever done on this line.

== Operation ==
The first train ran over the line on January 2, 1869. In addition to passenger service, the railroad was soon shipping significant quantities of coal, lime, and iron ore. In 1869 or 1870, the Ferromonte Railroad opened, connecting to the Chester Branch at Vannatta Junction, near Kenvil, running east to several large ore mines.

The Chester iron industry declined after the 1880s. The Chester Branch continued to operate largely as a rural branch line into the Great Depression. Passenger service was discontinued effective January 1, 1933. Freight shipments on the branch were minimal, and it was abandoned south of Righter Road in Succasunna effective December 7, 1933. The rails were removed in the summer of 1934. The line from Chester Junction to Succasunna is still in operation as an industrial spur.

== Notes and references ==
=== Works cited ===
- Lowenthal, Larry (1981). Iron Mine Railroads of Northern New Jersey. Dover, New Jersey: The Tri-State Railway Historical Society.
