= Mountain Station =

NJ Transit rail station

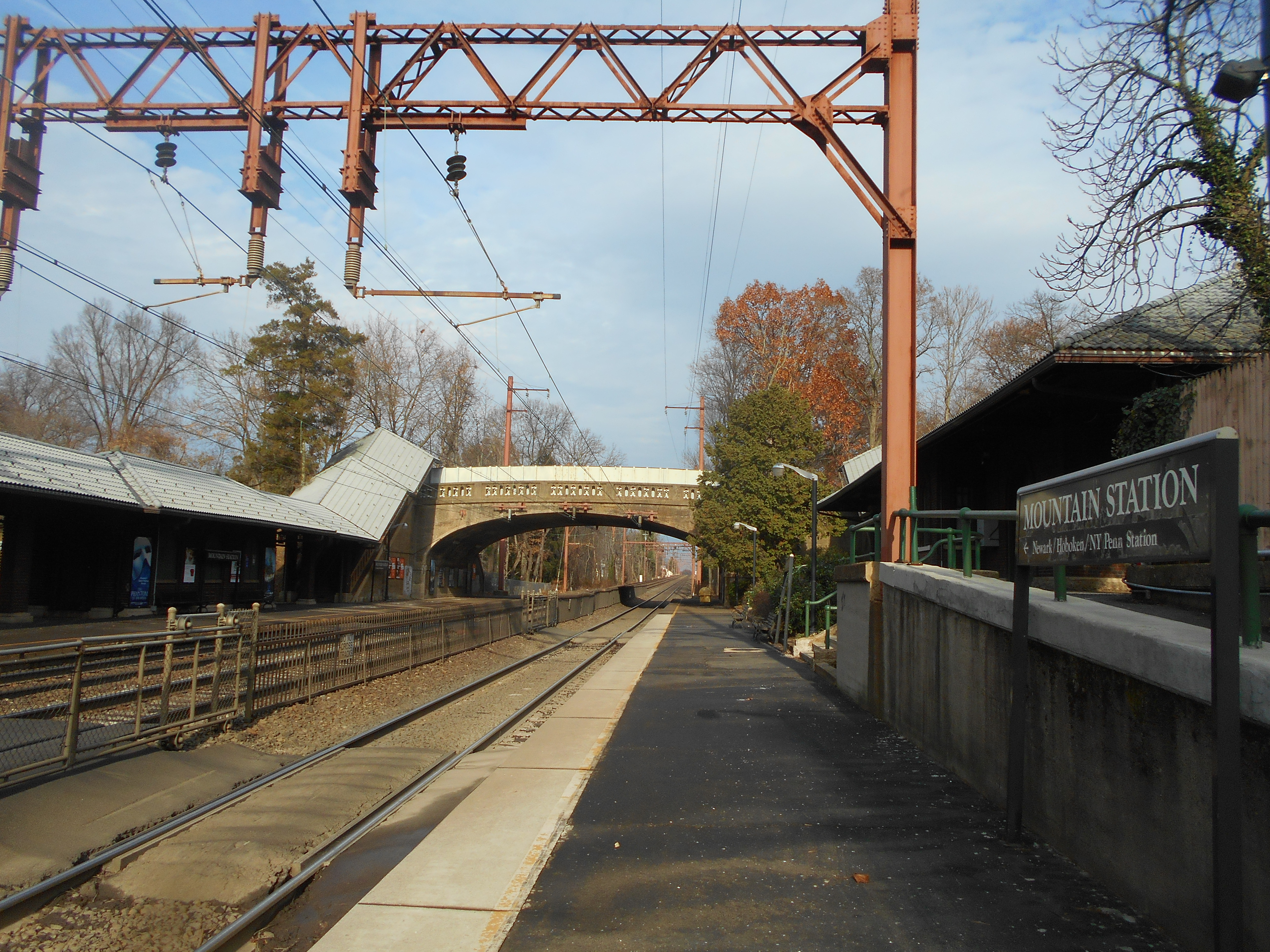
- Mountain Station facing eastbound from the New York City-bound platform in December 2014

General information
- Owner: New Jersey Transit
- Platforms: 2 side platforms
- Tracks: 3
- Connections: NJT Bus: 92 (one block east on Scotland Road)

Other information
- Fare zone: 5

History
- Rebuilt: 1870s, 1914–1915
- Electrified: September 22, 1930
- Former names: Montrose

Passengers
- 2025: 227 (average weekday)
- Rank: 96 of 153

Services
Preceding station	NJ Transit	Following station
South Orange toward Gladstone	Gladstone Branch weekdays	Highland Avenue toward New York or Hoboken
South Orange toward Hackettstown	Morristown Line	Highland Avenue toward New York or Hoboken
Former services
Preceding station	Delaware, Lackawanna and Western Railroad	Following station
South Orange toward Buffalo	Main Line	Highland Avenue toward Hoboken
- Mountain Station
- U.S. National Register of Historic Places
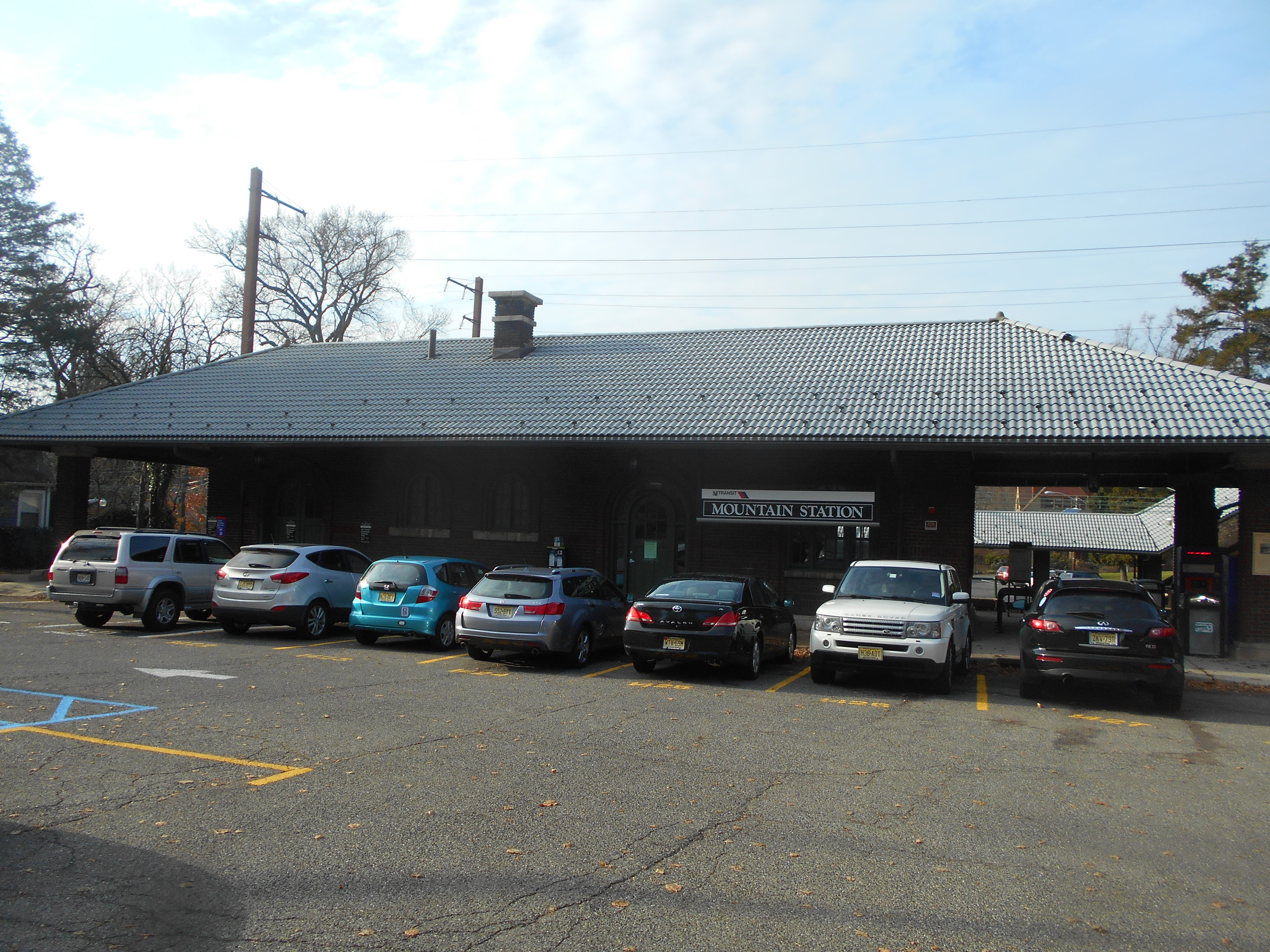
- The eastbound station depot at Mountain station, seen in December 2014 from Vose Avenue.
- Location: 449 Vose Avenue, South Orange, New Jersey
- Coordinates: 40°45′17″N 74°15′13″W
- Area: 2.5 acres (1.0 ha)
- Built: 1915
- Architects: Nies, Frank J.
- Architectural style: Renaissance
- MPS: Operating Passenger Railroad Stations TR
- NRHP reference No.: 84002656
- Added to NRHP: September 29, 1984
Location

Mountain Station is a New Jersey Transit station in South Orange, Essex County, New Jersey, United States, along the Morris and Essex (formerly Erie Lackawanna Morristown Line). The station, built in 1915, was designed by Frank J. Nies. It has been listed in the New Jersey Register of Historic Places and National Register of Historic Places since 1984 and is part of the Operating Passenger Railroad Stations Thematic Resource.

== Station layout and service ==
The station is somewhat unusual in that when the Lackawanna Railroad rebuilt the Morristown Line during the 1910s and 1920s, to eliminate grade crossings between Newark and Millburn, Mountain Station was the only location at which the elevation of the railroad's roadbed was not changed. As a result, the grade crossing of Montrose Avenue at the eastbound end of the station was eliminated and the roadway was raised onto a bridge. At the westbound end of the station, the Mountain House Road crossing was eliminated entirely and a pedestrian walkway was built. The walkway was removed during the late 1970s as part of the re-electrification project for the line, however, access to Montrose Avenue is still available due to stairs on the platform.

At present, as in the past, most trains that stop here proceed onto, or have originated in, Hoboken. Most Midtown Direct trains into New York City bypass Mountain Station, but a large number do stop at the main station in South Orange, which is less than a mile to the south (timetable west). Midtown Direct trains can be accessed from Mountain Station by transferring at an intermediate station. In addition, the 92 NJT Bus is available on Scotland Road, which goes to either South Orange station or towards Branch Brook Park Light Rail station.

== See also ==
- List of New Jersey Transit stations
- Operating Passenger Railroad Stations Thematic Resource (New Jersey)
- National Register of Historic Places listings in Essex County, New Jersey
