= Morris & Essex Lines =

Rail lines in New Jersey

The Morris & Essex Lines are a group of former Delaware, Lackawanna and Western Railroad (DL&W) railroad lines in New Jersey now owned and operated by NJ Transit. The lines include service offered on the Morristown Line and the Gladstone Branch. Prior to 2002, the former Montclair Branch, now part of the Montclair–Boonton Line, was included as well. The name refers to the Morris and Essex Railroad, which originally constructed the lines before being leased by the DL&W in 1868, and later outright acquired in 1945.

The lines were electrified by the DL&W at 3000 V DC in 1930/31, and by August 1984 had been converted to 25 kV 60 Hz by NJ Transit.

Service is available directly to Hoboken Terminal or via the Kearny Connection to Secaucus Junction and Penn Station in Midtown Manhattan. Passengers can transfer at Newark Broad Street or Summit to reach the other destination if necessary.
