= Morris and Essex Railroad =

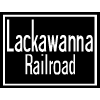

Overview
- Headquarters: Hoboken, New Jersey
- Locale: New Jersey
- Dates of operation: 1836–1945 (officially merged into the DL&W)

The Morris and Essex Railroad was a railroad across northern New Jersey, later part of the main line of the Delaware, Lackawanna and Western Railroad.

== History ==
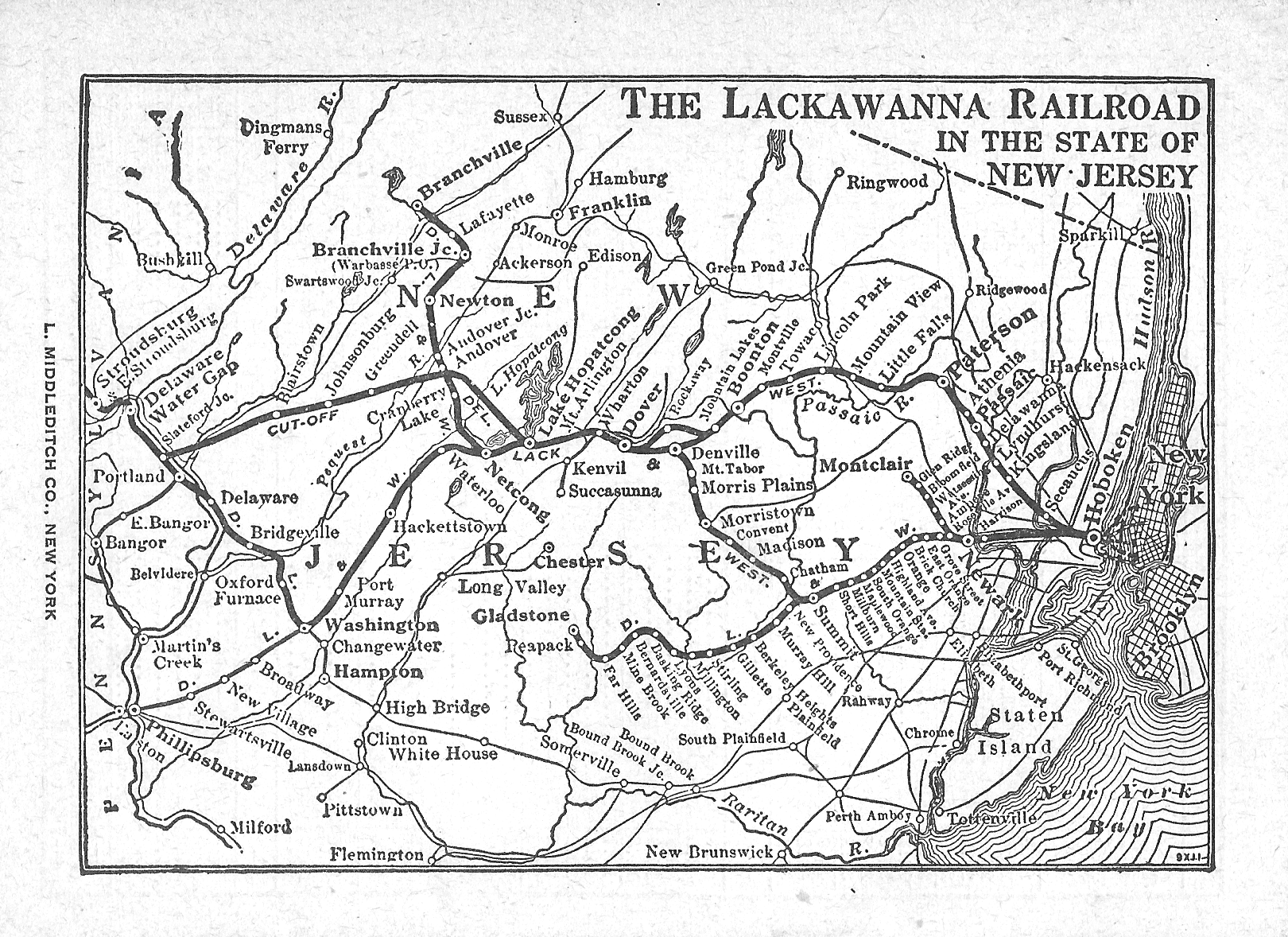
State of New Jersey system map for the DL&W suburban service, including the M&E Lines

The M&E was incorporated January 29, 1835, to build a line from Newark in Essex County west to and beyond Morristown in Morris County. The first section, from Newark west to Orange, opened on November 19, 1836. Under an agreement signed on October 21, the New Jersey Rail Road provided connecting service from Newark east to Jersey City via the Bergen Hill Cut. The original connection between the two lines was in downtown Newark; the M&E turned south on Broad Street to meet a branch of the NJRR at Market Street. Service to Paulus Hook in what is today Jersey City commenced on October 14, 1836 and passengers could transfer to the Jersey City Ferry and cross to lower Manhattan at the nearby ferry slips.

On January 1, 1838, the M&E extended their route to Morristown. On October 29 of that year, an agreement was signed to move the NJRR connection to the foot of Centre Street (via the northeast side of Park Place, to the NJRR alignment along the Passaic River), and the track on Broad Street was removed. Through car service began August 1, 1843, with horse power used along the streets, between Broad Street station and the foot of Centre Street.

Continuations opened west to Dover on July 31, 1848, Hackettstown in January 1854, and the full distance to Phillipsburg in 1866.

A new alignment, including a bridge over the Passaic River, was built by the NJRR and opened on August 5, 1854, ending at East Newark Junction with the NJRR main line in Harrison. This eliminated the street running in downtown Newark; those tracks were removed the next year after a lawsuit was filed by Newark.

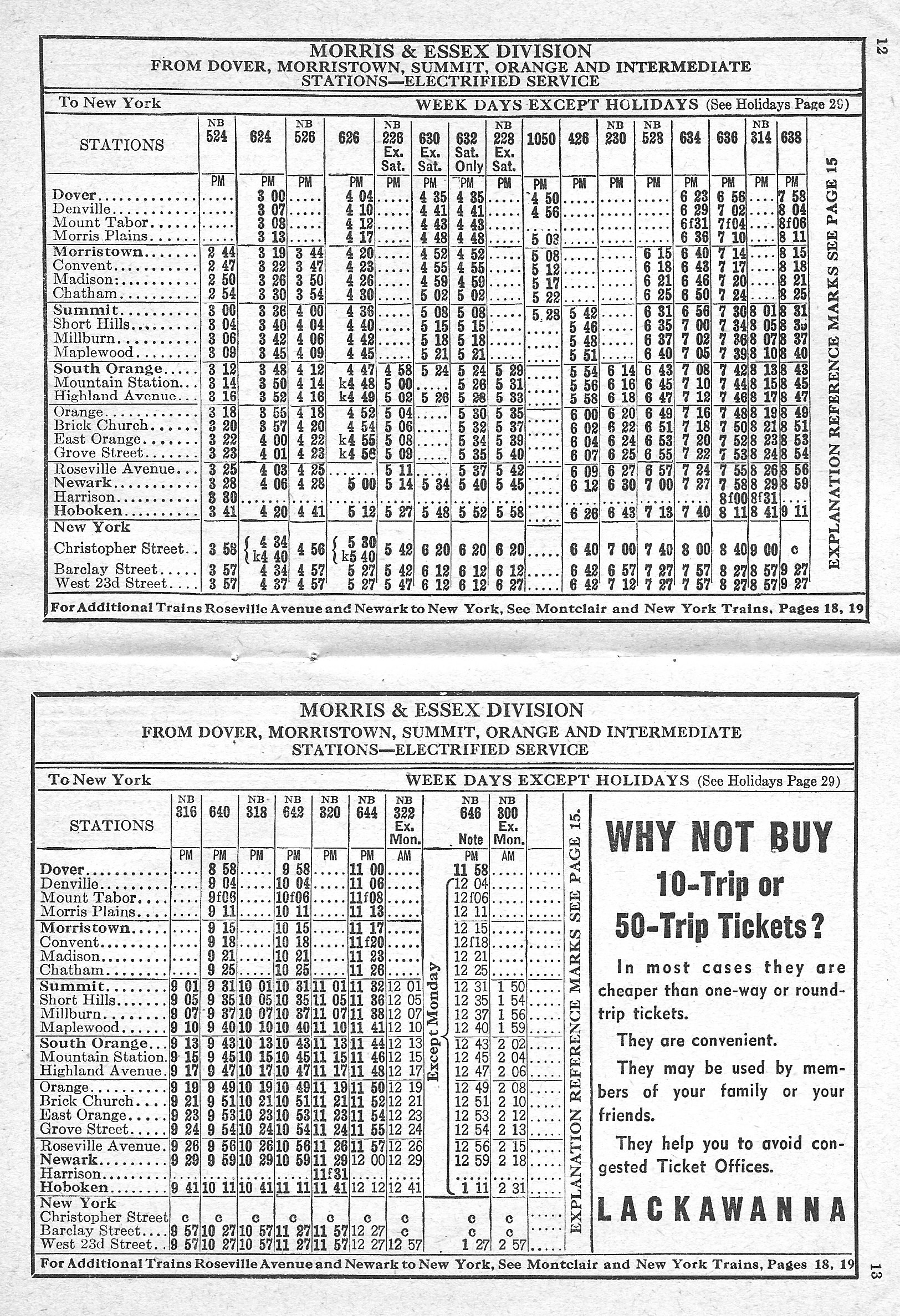
Delaware, Lackawanna and Western Railroad, suburban timetable (Form 10A), effective October 28, 1945, showing evening weekday reverse-peak electric service to Hoboken Terminal. and an advertisement for multi-ride tickets. This corresponds to today's NJ Transit Morris & Essex Lines.

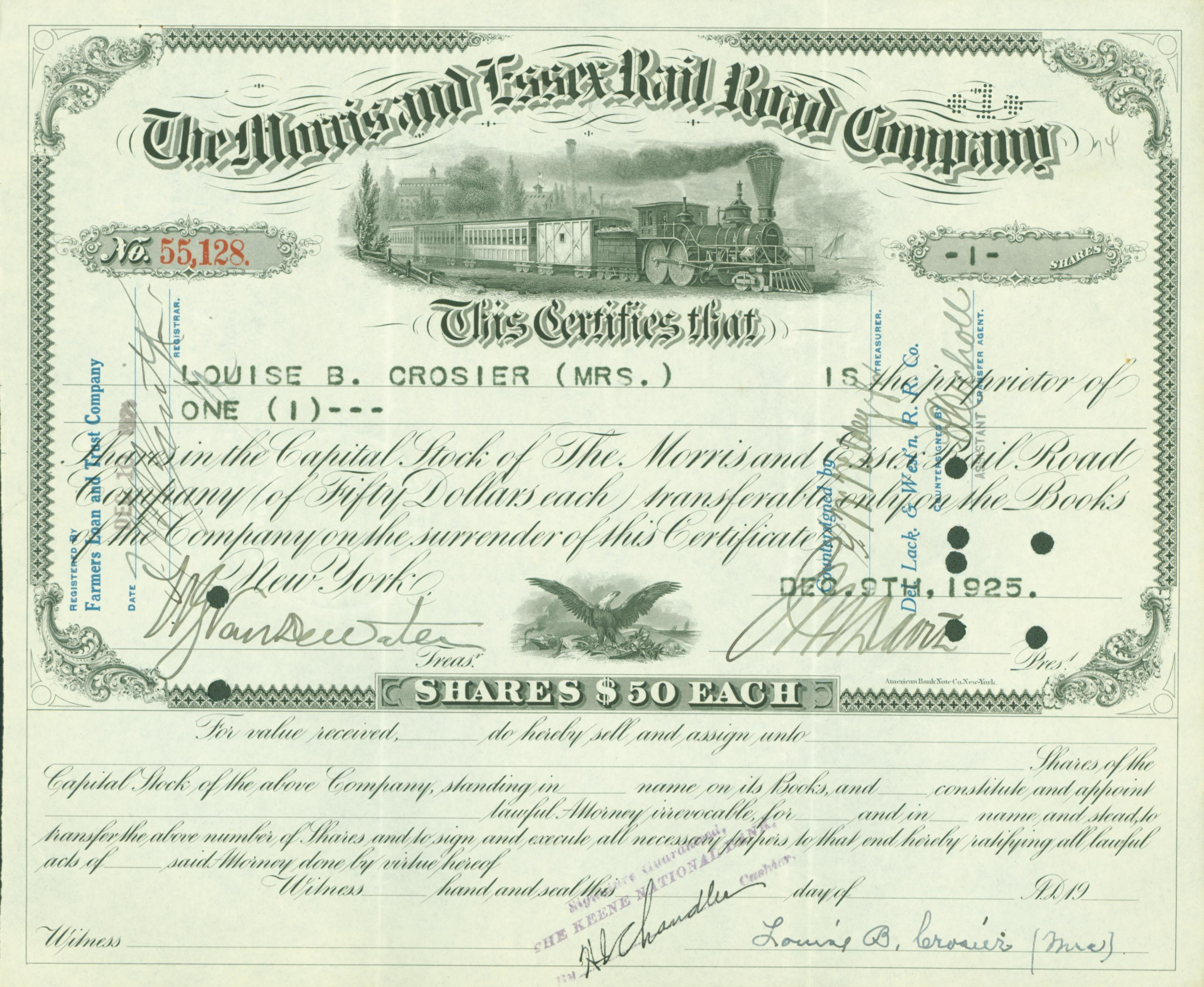
Share of the Morris and Essex Rail Road Company, issued 9. December 1925

On March 6, 1857, a supplement to the M&E charter was passed, authorizing it to buy the new alignment (until then owned by the NJRR as their East Newark Branch) and build a new line to Jersey City, as long as it passed under Bergen Hill in a tunnel. With this authority, the M&E became important as a possible competitor to the NJRR, and began negotiations with the Camden and Amboy Railroad. The New Brunswick, Millburn and Orange Railroad was proposed as a connection between the two, allowing for a C&A route to Jersey City without using the NJRR.

The Hoboken Land and Improvement Company operated a ferry across the Hudson River between Hoboken and New York City. Until early 1859 the NJRR paid the HL&I for the business that instead used the NJRR ferry. Because of this, the HL&I decided to help the M&E by building their new alignment, using the New York and Erie Railroad's Long Dock Tunnel. To use the Erie's tunnel a supplement to their charter was needed; this was passed March 8, 1860 after arguments against the bill from the NJRR. Another legal obstacle was the NJRR's monopoly over bridges, granted to the Passaic and Hackensack Bridge Company, invalidated by the state in 1861. The first excursion train operated on the new alignment on November 14, 1862, but a contract required the M&E to continue using the NJRR until October 13, 1863. The next day, regular service began via the new alignment.

On November 1, 1865, the Atlantic and Great Western Railway leased the M&E as part of its planned route to the west. However, the A&GW went bankrupt in 1867 and the lease was cancelled. The Delaware, Lackawanna and Western Railroad leased the M&E on December 10, 1868, connecting to their Warren Railroad at Washington.

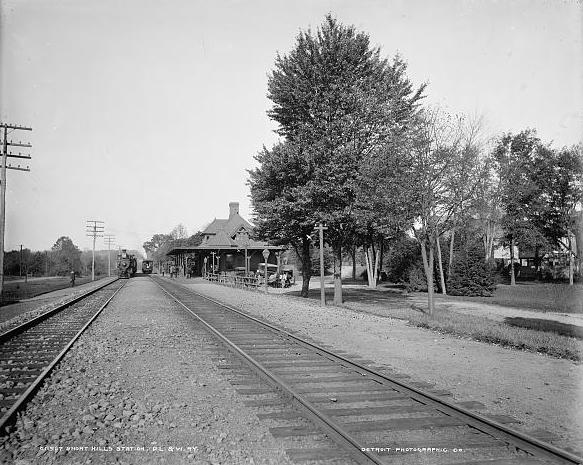
Short Hills Station, Delaware, Lackawanna and Western Railroad ca. 1895

In 1868 the Morris & Essex leased the Newark and Bloomfield Railroad, which connected Roseville Avenue to Bloomfield and Montclair, then West Bloomfield.

In 1876, the new tunnel under Bergen Hill opened, after hostilities including a frog war in late 1870 and early 1871, caused by the M&E's attempts to modify the connection between their Boonton Branch, a newer freight bypass, and the Erie tunnel.

The DL&W built the New Jersey Cut-Off, a long low-grade bypass in northwestern New Jersey, opened in 1911 from the M&E at Port Morris west to Slateford Junction just inside Pennsylvania.

On July 26, 1945, the M&E was formally merged into the DL&W. However it remained the Morris and Essex Division, and even today New Jersey Transit calls it the Morris and Essex Lines. In 1960 the DL&W merged with the Erie Railroad to form the Erie-Lackawanna Railroad, becoming part of Conrail in 1976.

== Stations ==
1. New York (Foot of Barclay Street)
2. New York (Foot of Christopher Street) (ferry)
3. Hoboken (MP 1.25) (ferry)
4. West End (MP 3.25)
5. Seaboard (MP 5)
6. Kearny Junction (MP7.0)
7. Harrison (MP 9)
8. Newark (MP 10) – Junction Newark and Bloomfield Railway
9. Roseville Avenue, Newark (MP 11.0)
10. East Orange (MP 12)
11. Brick Church (MP 13)
12. Orange (MP 13)
13. Highland Avenue, Orange (MP 14)
14. Mountain Station, South Orange (MP 15)
15. South Orange (MP 16)
16. Maplewood (MP 17)
17. Millburn (MP 19)
18. Short Hills (MP 20)
19. Summit (MP 22)
20. Chatham (MP 26)
21. Madison (MP 28)
22. Convent (MP 30)
23. Morristown (MP 32) – Junction with Morristown & Erie Railway
24. Morris Plains (MP 34)
25. Mount Tabor (MP 38)
26. Denville (MP 38) – Junction with Boonton Branch
27. Rockaway (MP 40)
28. Dover (MP 43)
29. Wharton (MP 44)
30. Chester Junction (MP 45) – Junction with Chester Railroad
31. Lake Junction (MP 45) – Junction with Central Railroad of New Jersey
32. Mount Arlington (MP 47)
33. Drakesville (MP 48)
34. Lake Hopatcong (MP 49)
35. Port Morris Junction (MP 50)
36. Port Morris (MP 51)
37. Sussex Branch Junction (MP 53)
38. Netcong/Stanhope (MP 53)
39. Waterloo (MP 56) – Junction with Sussex Railroad of New Jersey
40. Hacketttstown (MP 62)
41. Port Murray (MP 67)
42. Washington (MP 71) – Junction with Delaware, Lackawanna and Western Railroad
43. Broadway (MP 76)
44. Stewartsville (MP 80)
45. Phillipsburg Union Station (MP 85)
46. Easton (MP 85), – Junction with Lehigh Valley Railroad, Central Railroad of New Jersey, and the Lehigh and Susquehanna Railroad

== Branches ==
Boonton

The Boonton Branch was first built as a short branch from the main line at Denville east to Boonton. It was later extended much further east toward Paterson and then south to return to the main line at the west end of Bergen Hill; this opened on September 17, 1870. A realignment was later built at the west end, bypassing Denville and some curves, for a shortcut of both the branch and the main line. In 1903 the Kingsland Tunnel opened as part of a short realignment at Kingsland. The Harrison Cut-off was built in the 1920s as a connection from the Boonton Branch at Kingsland south to the main line in Kearny.

Paterson

The Morris and Essex Extension Railroad was chartered in 1889 and opened later that year, connecting the Boonton Branch to Paterson.

Montclair

The Newark and Bloomfield Railroad was chartered in 1852 and opened in 1855 as a short branch from the main line at Roseville Avenue/Bloomfield Junction northwest to Montclair via Bloomfield. It was built by the M&E and mostly owned by them. The M&E leased it on April 1, 1868.

Gladstone

The Gladstone Branch was the only completed part of the New Jersey West Line Railroad, a failed plan to build a new line across the state. The actually-constructed portion went from Summit on the M&E west to Bernardsville, and it was soon renamed the Passaic and Delaware Railroad. The DL&W leased it on November 1, 1882 as a branch of the M&E. The Passaic and Delaware Extension Railroad was chartered in 1890 and opened later that year, extending the line to Gladstone.

Morris Plains

Chester

The Chester Railroad was incorporated in 1867 and opened in 1872, running from the M&E west of Dover southwest to Chester.

Hopatcong

The short Hopatcong Railroad was a branch from the M&E at Hopatcong north to Roxbury. The DL&W bought it in 1892.

Sussex

The Sussex Railroad stretched north from the M&E at Waterloo (later Stanhope) to Newton and beyond. The DL&W leased it in 1924.
