= Warren Township, New Jersey =

Township in Somerset County, New Jersey, US

- Township
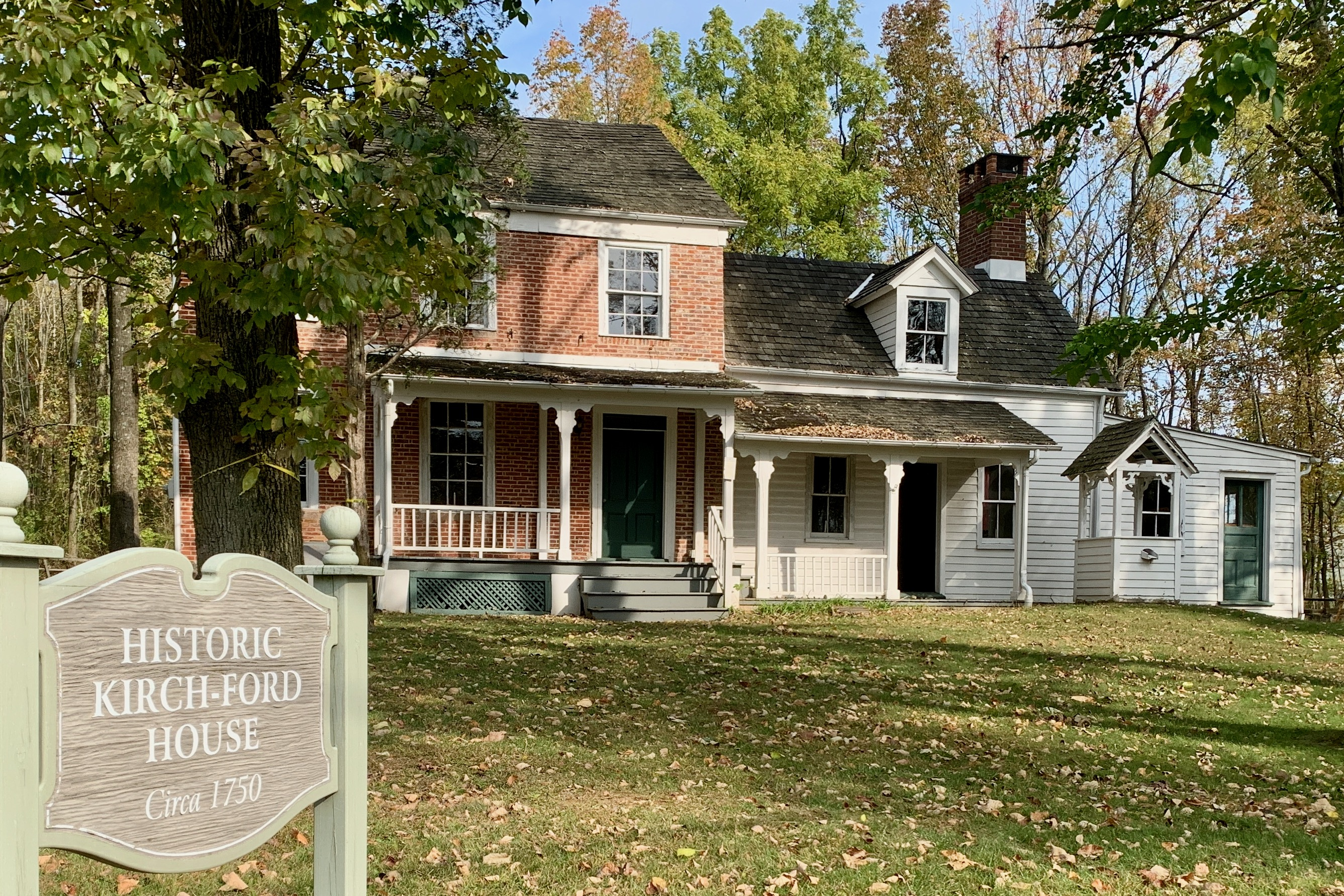
- Kirch–Ford House

- Seal

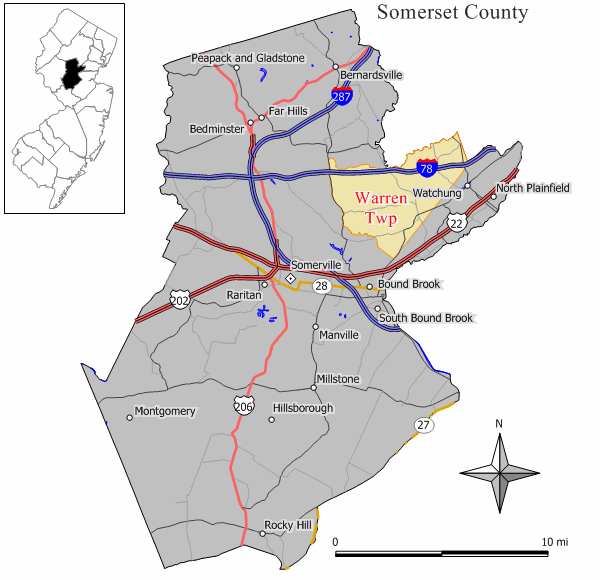
- Location of Warren Township in Somerset County highlighted in yellow (right). Inset map: Location of Somerset County in New Jersey highlighted in black (left).

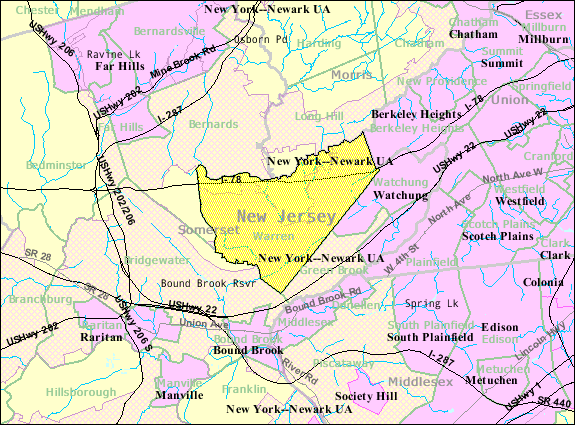
- Census Bureau map of Warren Township, New Jersey
- Interactive map of Warren Township, New Jersey
- Location in Somerset County Location in New Jersey Location in the United States
- Coordinates: 40.634588°N 74.519044°W
- Country: United States
- State: New Jersey
- County: Somerset
- Incorporated: March 5, 1806
- Named for: Joseph Warren

Government
  - Type: Township
  - Body: Township Committee
  - Mayor: Shaun Fine (R, term as mayor ends December 31, 2026)
  - Administrator: Mark M. Krane
  - Municipal clerk: Donna Hands

Area
  - Total: 19.64 sq mi (50.86 km^{2})
  - Land: 19.57 sq mi (50.68 km^{2})
  - Water: 0.069 sq mi (0.18 km^{2}) 0.36%
  - Rank: 144th of 565 in state 8th of 21 in county
- Elevation: 509 ft (155 m)

Population (2020)
  - Total: 15,923
  - Estimate (2023): 16,155
  - Rank: 165th of 565 in state 7th of 21 in county
  - Density: 813.8/sq mi (314.2/km^{2})
  - Rank: 405th of 565 in state 13th of 21 in county
- Time zone: UTC−05:00 (Eastern (EST))
  - Summer (DST): UTC−04:00 (Eastern (EDT))
- ZIP Code: 07059
- Area codes: 732 and 908
- FIPS code: 3403576940
- GNIS feature ID: 0882173
- Website: www.warrennj.org

Warren Township is a township in Somerset County, in the U.S. state of New Jersey. The township is a bedroom suburb of New York City in the much larger New York metropolitan area, located within the Raritan Valley region. As of the 2020 United States census, the township's population was 15,923, an increase of 612 (+4.0%) from the 2010 census count of 15,311, which in turn reflected an increase of 1,052 (+7.4%) from the 14,259 counted in the 2000 census. Warren is situated in northeastern Somerset County bordering both Morris (along the Passaic River) and Union counties.

The township has been one of the state's highest-income communities. Based on data from the American Community Survey for 2013–2017, Warren Township residents had a median household income of $154,647, ranked 12th in the state among municipalities with more than 10,000 residents, more than double the statewide median of $76,475.

In 2012, Forbes.com listed Warren as 334th in its listing of "America's Most Expensive ZIP Codes", with a median home price of $842,750.

== History ==
Warren was originally inhabited by the Lenape Native Americans and was colonized in the 1720s by European farmers. As early as 1900, it became a destination for wealthy residents looking to escape nearby New York City. Warren was incorporated as a township by an act of the New Jersey Legislature on March 5, 1806, from portions of Bernards Township and Bridgewater Township. The south-eastern half of the original township (which was close to a railroad and contained most of the population) was separated off as North Plainfield Township (since renamed to Green Brook Township) on April 2, 1872.

Warren was named for Revolutionary War patriot, General Joseph Warren, who was killed at the Battle of Bunker Hill. The township celebrated its 200th anniversary in 2006.

The Historical Sites Committee was formed in 1971 and members are appointed by the governing body to administer municipally owned historic landmarks. The historical landmarks they have protected are the Mount Bethel Baptist Meetinghouse, the Baker–Duderstadt Farm, the Kirch–Ford House, and two small family cemeteries. The Meetinghouse, Baker-Duderstadt Farm, and the Kirch–Ford House are listed on the National Register of Historic Places.

== Geography ==
According to the United States Census Bureau, the township had a total area of 19.64 square miles (50.86 km^{2}), including 19.57 square miles (50.68 km^{2}) of land and 0.07 square miles (0.18 km^{2}) of water (0.36%).

Unincorporated communities, localities and place names located partially or completely within the township include Coontown, Dock Watch Hollow, Gallia, Mount Bethel, Round Top, Smalleytown, Springdale, Union Village, and Warrenville.

The township borders Bernards Township to the north and west, Bridgewater Township to the southwest, Green Brook Township to the southeast, and Watchung to the east; all of which lie within Somerset County. Northeastern borders are the communities of Long Hill in Morris County and Berkeley Heights in Union County.

The east–west Second Watchung Mountain ridge bisects Warren, with the northern half of the township sloping northward to the Passaic River and Dead River, and the southern half spanning the Washington Valley, between the First and Second Watchung Mountain ridges, through which runs the East Branch of the Middle Brook. At the border with Bridgewater Township, the Second Watchung Mountain features a prominent cliff face at the now-abandoned Dock Watch Quarry.

As of 2026, the township is a member of Local Leaders for Responsible Planning in order to address the township's Mount Laurel doctrine-based housing obligations.

== Demographics ==
Historical population
Census	Pop.	Note	%±
1810	1,354		—
1820	1,452		7.2%
1830	1,561		7.5%
1840	1,601		2.6%
1850	2,148		34.2%
1860	2,338		8.8%
1870	2,705		15.7%
1880	1,204	*	−55.5%
1890	1,045		−13.2%
1900	1,008		−3.5%
1910	1,035		2.7%
1920	1,083		4.6%
1930	1,399		29.2%
1940	2,139		52.9%
1950	3,316		55.0%
1960	5,386		62.4%
1970	8,592		59.5%
1980	9,805		14.1%
1990	10,830		10.5%
2000	14,259		31.7%
2010	15,311		7.4%
2020	15,923		4.0%
2023 (est.)	16,155		1.5%
Population sources: 1800–1920 1840 1850–1870; 1850 1870 1880–1890; 1890–1910 1910–1930; 1940–2000 2000; 2010 2020 * = Lost territory in previous decade.

=== 2020 census ===
Warren Township, Somerset County, New Jersey – Racial and ethnic composition Note: the US Census treats Hispanic/Latino as an ethnic category. This table excludes Latinos from the racial categories and assigns them to a separate category. Hispanics/Latinos may be of any race.
Race / Ethnicity (NH = Non-Hispanic)	Pop 2000	Pop 2010	Pop 2020	% 2000	% 2010	% 2020
White alone (NH)	11,918	11,704	10,569	83.58%	76.44%	66.38%
Black or African American alone (NH)	169	225	277	1.19%	1.47%	1.74%
Native American or Alaska Native alone (NH)	1	6	6	0.01%	0.04%	0.04%
Asian alone (NH)	1,520	2,304	3,249	10.66%	15.05%	20.40%
Native Hawaiian or Pacific Islander alone (NH)	5	3	4	0.04%	0.02%	0.03%
Other race alone (NH)	22	24	95	0.15%	0.16%	0.60%
Mixed race or Multiracial (NH)	169	225	567	1.19%	1.47%	3.56%
Hispanic or Latino (any race)	455	820	1,156	3.19%	5.36%	7.26%
Total	14,259	15,311	15,923	100.00%	100.00%	100.00%

=== 2010 census ===
The 2010 United States census counted 15,311 people, 5,059 households, and 4,285 families in the township. The population density was 782.5 per square mile (302.1/km^{2}). There were 5,258 housing units at an average density of 268.7 per square mile (103.7/km^{2}). The racial makeup was 80.94% (12,392) White, 1.52% (233) Black or African American, 0.05% (7) Native American, 15.07% (2,307) Asian, 0.10% (15) Pacific Islander, 0.64% (98) from other races, and 1.69% (259) from two or more races. Hispanic or Latino of any race were 5.36% (820) of the population.

Of the 5,059 households, 42.7% had children under the age of 18; 75.8% were married couples living together; 6.6% had a female householder with no husband present and 15.3% were non-families. Of all households, 12.7% were made up of individuals and 6.4% had someone living alone who was 65 years of age or older. The average household size was 3.01 and the average family size was 3.30.

27.8% of the population were under the age of 18, 5.9% from 18 to 24, 18.5% from 25 to 44, 34.4% from 45 to 64, and 13.4% who were 65 years of age or older. The median age was 43.8 years. For every 100 females, the population had 95.5 males. For every 100 females ages 18 and older there were 94.1 males.

The Census Bureau's 2006–2010 American Community Survey showed that (in 2010 inflation-adjusted dollars) median household income was $135,143 (with a margin of error of +/− $23,156) and the median family income was $162,083 (+/− $17,221). Males had a median income of $115,875 (+/− $15,861) versus $68,450 (+/− $13,300) for females. The per capita income for the township was $71,469 (+/− $6,664). About 0.8% of families and 0.9% of the population were below the poverty line, including 0.8% of those under age 18 and none of those age 65 or over.

=== 2000 census ===
As of the 2000 United States census there were 14,259 people, 4,629 households, and 3,939 families residing in the township. The population density was 725.0 inhabitants per square mile (279.9/km^{2}). There were 4,718 housing units at an average density of 239.9 per square mile (92.6/km^{2}). The racial makeup of the township was 86.28% White, 1.26% African American, 0.04% Native American, 10.67% Asian, 0.06% Pacific Islander, 0.41% from other races, and 1.28% from two or more races. Hispanic or Latino of any race were 3.19% of the population.

There were 4,629 households, out of which 45.3% had children under the age of 18 living with them, 78.3% were married couples living together, 4.8% had a female householder with no husband present, and 14.9% were non-families. 12.2% of all households were made up of individuals, and 5.0% had someone living alone who was 65 years of age or older. The average household size was 3.05 and the average family size was 3.33.

In the township the population was spread out, with 29.7% under the age of 18, 4.6% from 18 to 24, 27.5% from 25 to 44, 27.0% from 45 to 64, and 11.2% who were 65 years of age or older. The median age was 39 years. For every 100 females, there were 99.1 males. For every 100 females age 18 and over, there were 95.6 males.

The median income for a household in the township was $103,677, and the median income for a family was $121,264. Males had a median income of $80,231 versus $46,356 for females. The per capita income for the township was $49,475. About 0.7% of families and 2.1% of the population were below the poverty line, including 1.4% of those under age 18 and 1.5% of those age 65 or over.

== Economy ==
The insurance company Chubb is based in Warren.

== Arts and culture ==
Until 2017, the Serbian Orthodox Eparchy of Eastern America was headquartered in Warren Township.

== Parks and recreation ==
Wagner Farm Arboretum, which consists of 92.6 acres (37.5 ha) was the former Wagner Dairy Farm acquired by the township in 2001.

== Government ==
=== Local government ===
Warren Township is governed under the Township form of New Jersey municipal government, one of 141 municipalities (of the 564) statewide that use this form, the second-most commonly used form of government in the state. The Township Committee is comprised of five members, who are elected directly by the voters at-large in partisan elections to serve three-year terms of office on a staggered basis, with either one or two seats coming up for election each year as part of the November general election in a three-year cycle. At an annual reorganization meeting held in the first week of January, the Township Committee selects one of its members to serve as Mayor. Township Committee meetings are held at the municipal building on Thursdays.

As of 2026, Township Committee members are Mayor Shaun Fine (R, term on committee and as mayor ends December 31, 2026), Deputy Mayor Vanessa Kian (R, term on committee and as deputy mayor ends 2026), Lance Blick (R, 2027), Daniel Croson (R, 2027) and Daniel McCarey (R, 2028).

Former Township Committee member Frank Salvato, who was re-elected in 2008, served until his death in 2011 at the age of 98, having been first elected to the Committee in the 1938 and served as mayor in 1939, the township's youngest.

In 1975, the Township Committee created the position of Township Administrator, who is appointed to serve a one-year term beginning in July of each year. The Township Administrator is Mark M. Krane, who has served in that post since 1986.

=== Federal, state and county representation ===
Warren Township is located in the 7th Congressional District and is part of New Jersey's 21st state legislative district.

For the 119th United States Congress, New Jersey's 7th congressional district is represented by Thomas Kean Jr. (R, Westfield). New Jersey is represented in the United States Senate by Democrats Cory Booker (Newark, term ends 2027) and Andy Kim (Moorestown, term ends 2031).

For the 2026–2027 session, the 21st legislative district of the New Jersey Legislature is represented in the State Senate by Jon Bramnick (R, Westfield) and in the General Assembly by Vincent Kearney (D, Garwood) and Andrew Macurdy (D, Summit).

Somerset County is governed by a five-member Board of County Commissioners, whose members are elected at-large to three-year terms of office on a staggered basis, with one or two seats coming up for election each year. At an annual reorganization meeting held in the first week of January, the board selects a Director and deputy director from among its members. As of 2025, Somerset County's County Commissioners are Director Shanel Robinson (D, Franklin Township, term as commissioner ends 2027; term as director ends 2026), Deputy Director Paul Drake (D, Hillsborough Township, term as commissioner and as deputy director ends 2026), Melonie Marano (D, Green Brook Township, 2028), Elizabeth Graner (D, Bernards Township, 2026; elected to serve an unexpired term) and Sara Sooy (D, Bedminster Township, 2027).

Constitutional officers, elected on a countywide basis are Clerk Steve Peter (D, Somerville, 2027), Sheriff Darrin Russo (D, Franklin Township, 2028) and Surrogate Bernice "Tina" Jalloh (D, Franklin Township, 2030).

=== Politics ===
As of March 23, 2011, there were a total of 10,466 registered voters in Warren Township, of which 1,875 (17.9% vs. 26.0% countywide) were registered as Democrats, 3,484 (33.3% vs. 25.7%) were registered as Republicans and 5,102 (48.7% vs. 48.2%) were registered as Unaffiliated. There were 5 voters registered as Libertarians or Greens. Among the township's 2010 Census population, 68.4% (vs. 60.4% in Somerset County) were registered to vote, including 94.7% of those ages 18 and over (vs. 80.4% countywide).

United States presidential election results for Warren Township
Year	Republican		Democratic		Third party(ies)	
Year	No.	%	No.	%	No.	%
2024	5,052	51.64%	4,591	46.92%	141	1.44%
2020	4,991	48.44%	5,171	50.19%	141	1.37%
2016	4,483	53.09%	3,656	43.30%	305	3.61%
2012	4,605	62.99%	2,636	36.06%	70	0.96%
2008	4,813	58.98%	3,259	39.94%	88	1.08%
2004	4,761	60.93%	2,988	38.24%	65	0.83%
2000	3,619	59.34%	2,291	37.56%	189	3.10%

In the 2016 presidential election, Republican Donald Trump received 53.1% of the vote (4,483 cast), ahead of Democrat Hillary Clinton with 43.3% (3,656 votes), and other candidates received 3.6% (305 votes). A total of 8,444 ballots were cast. In the 2012 presidential election, Republican Mitt Romney received 63.0% of the vote (4,605 cast), ahead of Democrat Barack Obama with 36.1% (2,636 votes), and other candidates with 1.0% (70 votes), among the 7,351 ballots cast by the township's 11,286 registered voters (40 ballots were spoiled), for a turnout of 65.1%. In the 2008 presidential election, Republican John McCain received 4,813 votes (58.5% vs. 46.1% countywide), ahead of Democrat Barack Obama with 3,259 votes (39.6% vs. 52.1%) and other candidates with 88 votes (1.1% vs. 1.1%), among the 8,222 ballots cast by the township's 10,367 registered voters, for a turnout of 79.3% (vs. 78.7% in Somerset County). In the 2004 presidential election, Republican George W. Bush received 4,761 votes (60.5% vs. 51.5% countywide), ahead of Democrat John Kerry with 2,988 votes (38.0% vs. 47.2%) and other candidates with 65 votes (0.8% vs. 0.9%), among the 7,866 ballots cast by the township's 9,375 registered voters, for a turnout of 83.9% (vs. 81.7% in the whole county).

Gubernatorial election results for Warren Township
Year	Republican		Democratic		Third party(ies)	
Year	No.	%	No.	%	No.	%
2025	4,055	52.90%	3,571	46.59%	39	0.51%
2021	3,868	60.65%	2,476	38.82%	34	0.53%
2017	2,825	60.90%	1,728	37.25%	86	1.85%
2013	3,421	77.84%	899	20.46%	75	1.71%
2009	3,782	67.54%	1,355	24.20%	463	8.27%
2005	3,038	61.65%	1,763	35.78%	127	2.58%

In the 2013 gubernatorial election, Republican Chris Christie received 77.8% of the vote (3,421 cast), ahead of Democrat Barbara Buono with 20.5% (899 votes), and other candidates with 1.7% (75 votes), among the 4,444 ballots cast by the township's 11,430 registered voters (49 ballots were spoiled), for a turnout of 38.9%. In the 2009 gubernatorial election, Republican Chris Christie received 3,782 votes (67.2% vs. 55.8% countywide), ahead of Democrat Jon Corzine with 1,355 votes (24.1% vs. 34.1%), Independent Chris Daggett with 433 votes (7.7% vs. 8.7%) and other candidates with 30 votes (0.5% vs. 0.7%), among the 5,632 ballots cast by the township's 10,420 registered voters, yielding a 54.0% turnout (vs. 52.5% in the county).

United States Senate election results for Warren Township1
Year	Republican		Democratic		Third party(ies)	
Year	No.	%	No.	%	No.	%
2024	4,999	52.44%	4,361	45.75%	172	1.80%
2018	4,102	57.56%	2,847	39.95%	177	2.48%
2012	4,186	60.59%	2,584	37.40%	139	2.01%
2006	2,973	59.27%	1,919	38.26%	124	2.47%

United States Senate election results for Warren Township2
Year	Republican		Democratic		Third party(ies)	
Year	No.	%	No.	%	No.	%
2020	5,322	52.20%	4,768	46.77%	105	1.03%
2014	2,399	63.63%	1,300	34.48%	71	1.88%
2013	1,931	63.73%	1,078	35.58%	21	0.69%
2008	4,671	62.78%	2,571	34.56%	198	2.66%

== Education ==
The Warren Township Schools serve public school students in pre-kindergarten through eighth grade. As of the 2020–21 school year, the district, comprised of five schools, had an enrollment of 1,525 students and 188.3 classroom teachers (on an FTE basis), for a student–teacher ratio of 8.1:1. Schools in the district (with 2020–21 enrollment data from the National Center for Education Statistics.) are Central School with 293 students in grades K-5, Mt. Horeb School with 202 students in grades PreK-5, Angelo L. Tomaso School with 248 students in grades K-5, Woodland School with 229 students in grades K-5 and Warren Middle School with 544 students in grades 6-8.

Students in public school for ninth through twelfth grades attend Watchung Hills Regional High School, which serves students from Warren as well as the neighboring communities of Watchung, Green Brook (in Somerset County) and Long Hill Township (in Morris County). As of the 2020–21 school year, the high school had an enrollment of 1,909 students and 157.6 classroom teachers (on an FTE basis), for a student–teacher ratio of 12.1:1. The district's board of education is comprised of nine members, who are elected directly by the voters to serve three-year terms of office on a staggered basis, with three seats up for each year. Of the nine elected seats, four are allocated to Warren Township.

== Transportation ==
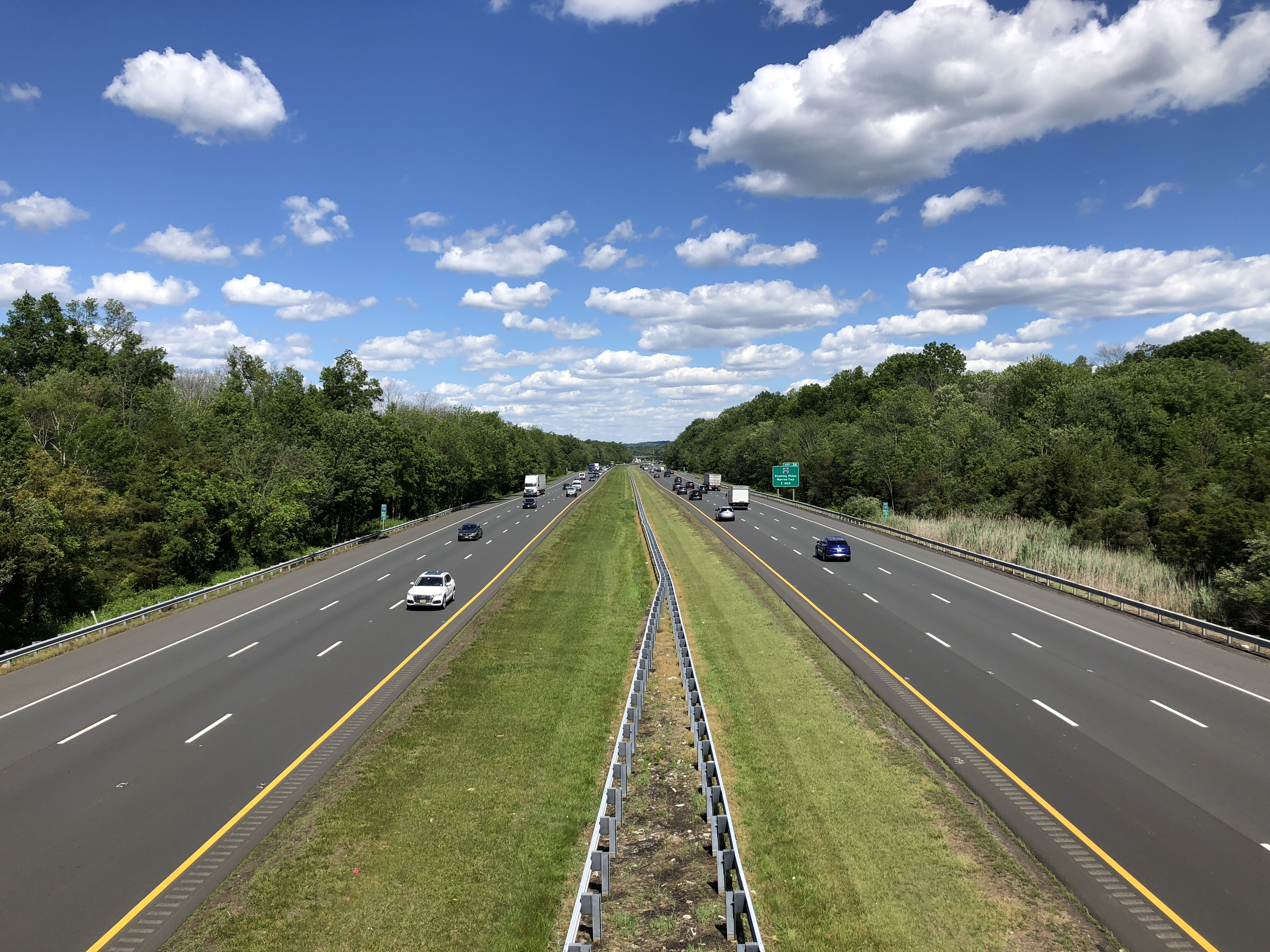
Interstate 78 in Warren Township

As of May 2010, the township had a total of 126.65 miles (203.82 km) of roadways, of which 101.34 miles (163.09 km) were maintained by the municipality, 18.64 miles (30.00 km) by Somerset County and 6.67 miles (10.73 km) by the New Jersey Department of Transportation.

Interstate 78 is the most prominent highway serving Warren Township, running east-west for 6.7 miles (10.8 km) across the northern portion of the township. Other significant roads which pass through the township include County Route 525, County Route 527 and County Route 531.

Lakeland Bus Lines provides Route 78 rush-hour service on weekdays from a park and ride at the Warren Corporate Center to the Port Authority Bus Terminal in Midtown Manhattan.

Nearby NJ Transit rail service for Warren residents with access to New York Penn Station and Hoboken Terminal is available at the nearby Berkeley Heights, Gillette and Stirling stations.

== Notable people ==
People who were born in, residents of, or otherwise closely associated with Warren Township include:

- Michael Arrom, musician and keyboardist for Steve Vai
- Scott Braun, studio host and reporter for MLB Network and NHL Network
- Ken Brenn Jr. (1952–2019), modified racing driver who won more than 100 feature events at venues in the Mid-Atlantic states
- Joe Cerisano, singer, songwriter and record producer
- Austen Crehore (1893–1962), World War I pilot in the Armée de l'Air and the recipient of the Legion of Honor and Croix de Guerre with two palms
- Monica Crowley (born 1968), conservative radio and TV talk show personality
- Donald DiFrancesco (born 1944), former N.J. Senate president and Acting Governor
- Daniel Edelman (born 2003), professional soccer player who plays as a midfielder
- Matthew Fallon (born 2002), swimmer who competed in the 2024 Summer Olympics
- Mike Ferguson (born 1970), former U.S. Congressman
- James L. Flanagan (1925–2015), electrical engineer
- Bob Franks (1951–2010), former N.J. legislative leader and U.S. Congressman
- Emma Fursch-Madi (1847–1894), French operatic soprano
- Gloria Gaynor (born 1943), singer, known for "I Will Survive"
- Andrew Horowitz (born 1983), known for his role in the band Tally Hall as the green-tied keyboardist
- Chris Kratt (born 1969), host of Kratts' Creatures and Zoboomafoo as well as Be the Creature, which runs on the National Geographic Channel
- Martin Kratt (born 1965), brother of Chris, and also an educational nature show host
- James Morris (born 1947), opera singer
- Amber Skye Noyes (born 1987), actress and singer, known for her portrayal of Tori Windsor in The CW series Beauty & the Beast and Celine Fox in the ABC thriller Quantico
- Calvin Pace (born 1980), outside linebacker for the New York Jets
- David Palmer, vocalist and songwriter, best known as a former member of Steely Dan and as the lyricist of the Carole King number two hit, "Jazzman"
- Casey Phair (born 2007), Korean-American footballer, youngest player ever to appear in a FIFA Women's World Cup
- Larry Ray (born 1959), criminal convicted of sex trafficking, extortion, forced labor, and other offenses, sentenced to 60 years in prison
- Allison Reed (born 1994), ice dancer who competes with Vasili Rogov for Israel
- Cathy Reed (born 1987), American-born Japanese ice dancer, who has competed with her brother Chris as her partner
- Chris Reed (born 1989), American-born Japanese ice dancer, who has competed with his sister Cathy as his partner
- Adam Riess (born 1969), Nobel Prize winner in Physics, 2011
- Dan Schulman (born 1958), President and CEO of PayPal, Chairman of Symantec
- Meena Seshamani (born 1977/78), politician and surgeon who has served as the Maryland Secretary of Health since 2025
- Rich Seubert (born 1978), Super Bowl champion with the New York Giants who coached the Watchung Hills Regional High School football team
- Ravi Shankar (1920–2012), musician and composer best known for his work on the sitar
- Steven H. Temares (born 1958), former CEO of Bed Bath & Beyond
- Nancy Van de Vate (1930–2023), composer, violist and pianist
- Jeffrey Vanderbeek (born 1958), former owner of the New Jersey Devils
- Lily Yip (born 1963), Olympic table tennis player and coach

== Points of interest ==
- Mount Bethel Baptist Meetinghouse
- Kirch–Ford House
- Torino's (traditionally: the King George Inn), c. 1820 The building was knocked down in 2019.
- Springdale United Methodist Church, c. 1840
- Mount Horeb United Methodist Church, 1867
- Hofheimer Mausoleum (sometimes colloquially referred to as the "Tomb of the 12 Nuns")
