= Gillette station =

NJ Transit rail station

Coordinates: 40°40′41.75″N 74°28′05″W

Gillette
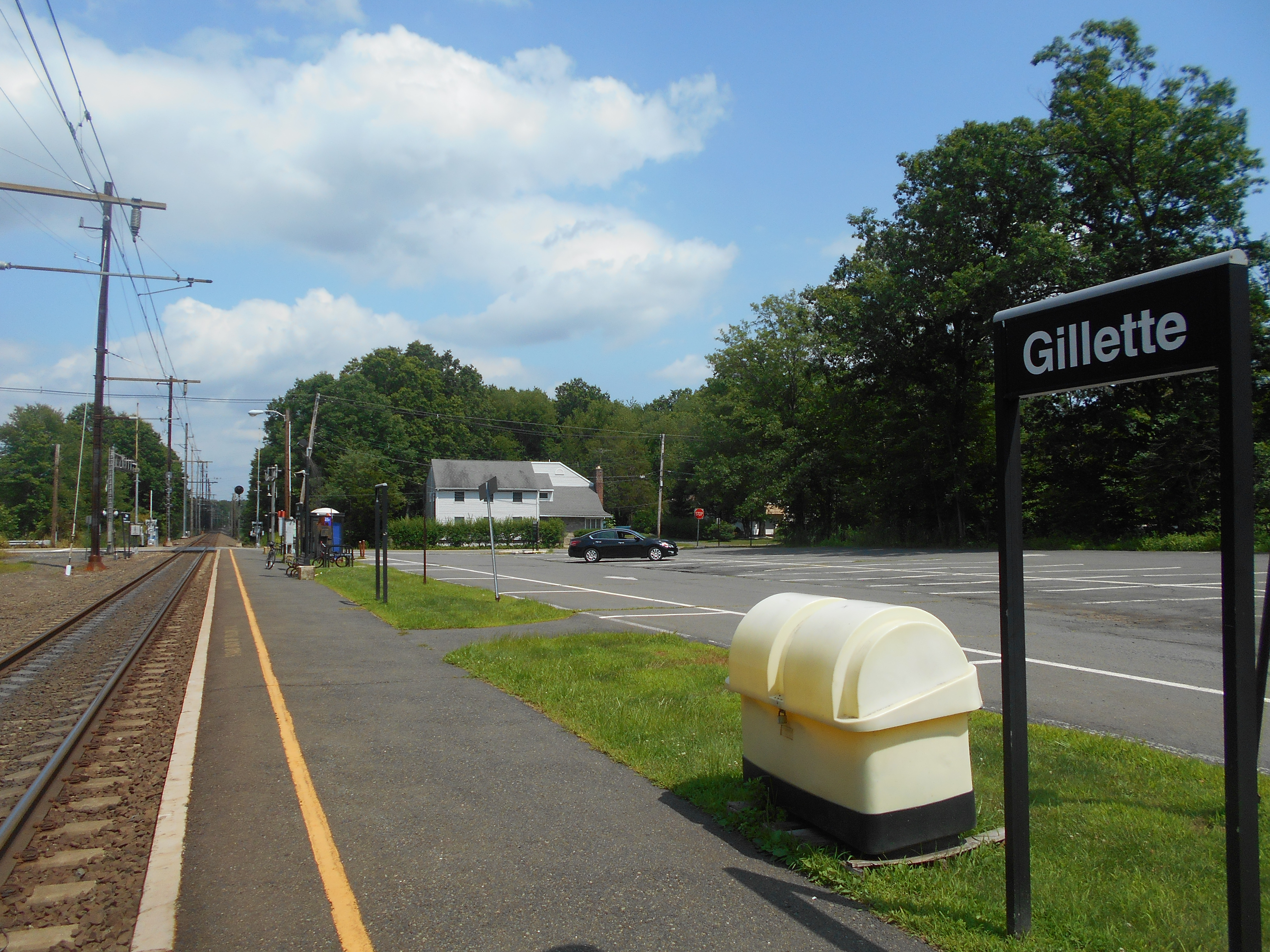
- Gillette station facing towards Berkeley Heights in July 2014.

General information
- Location: Mountain Avenue, Long Hill Township, New Jersey 07933
- Owner: NJ Transit
- Platforms: 1 side platform
- Tracks: 1

Other information
- Station code: 707 (Delaware, Lackawanna and Western)
- Fare zone: 12

History
- Opened: January 29, 1872
- Electrified: January 6, 1931

Passengers
- 2025: 78 (average weekday)
- Rank: 127 of 153

Services
Preceding station	NJ Transit	Following station
Stirling toward Gladstone	Gladstone Branch	Berkeley Heights toward New York or Hoboken
Former services
Preceding station	Delaware, Lackawanna and Western Railroad	Following station
Stirling toward Gladstone	Gladstone Branch	Berkeley Heights toward Hoboken
Location

Gillette is a station on the Gladstone Branch of the Morris & Essex Lines of NJ Transit in Long Hill Township, New Jersey. It is located at the intersection of Mountain Avenue and Jersey Avenue in the Gillette portion of Long Hill Township.

== History ==
George Howell was an engineer who surveyed the area for the New Jersey West Line Railroad. The station is named after the local unincorporated area. According to local story, the area of Gillette was named after Rachel Gillette Cornish. Mr. Howell was married to Rachel Melissa Cornish, the daughter of Rachel Gillette. Since the Gladstone Branch was opened, the station has never consisted more than a shelter for passengers on the side of the tracks, unlike nearby Stirling, which once boasted a large station depot built in 1872.

== Station layout ==
Gillette station contains one track and one low-level side platform on the inbound side of the track. The platform has a covered bench shelter, several newsstands, a pay telephone, and numerous benches. This station has a ticket vending machine. Bike racks are present next to the shelter. The station has an 82-space lot owned by New Jersey Transit, but contracted out to the township. Of the 82 spaces, 2 are handicap-accessible, although the station is not handicapped-accessible.

== See also ==
- Millington station - The third station in Long Hill Township.
