= Stirling railway station =

Stirling railway station may refer to:

- Stirling station (NJ Transit), in New Jersey, United States
- Stirling railway station (Scotland) in Stirling, Scotland
- Stirling railway station, Perth in Perth, Western Australia
