= Mount Bethel Baptist Meetinghouse =

Historic church in New Jersey, United States

- U.S. National Register of Historic Places
- New Jersey Register of Historic Places
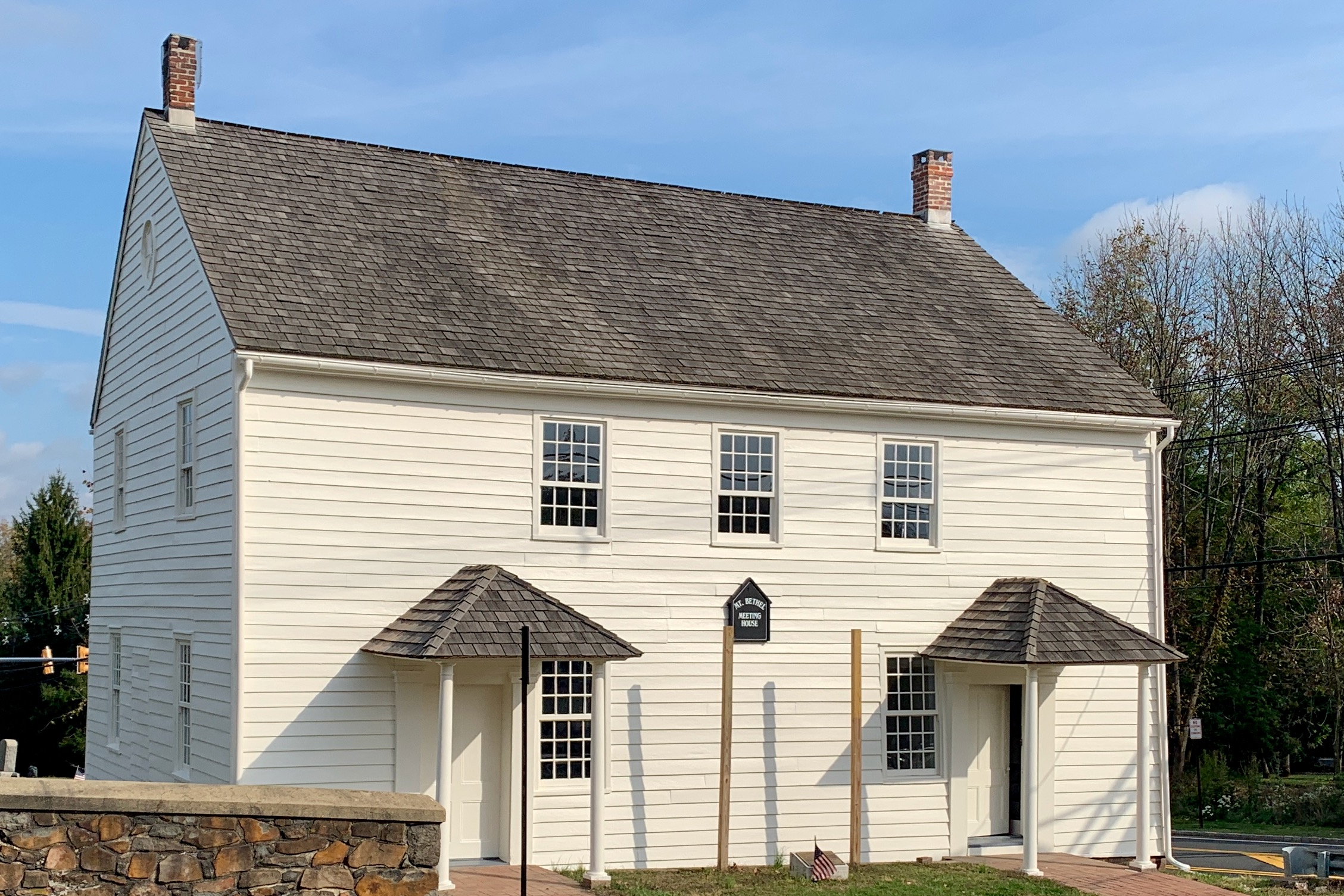
- Mount Bethel Baptist Meetinghouse in 2020

- Location within Somerset County, New Jersey Location within New Jersey Location within the United States
- Location: Warren Township, New Jersey
- Coordinates: 40°38′16.7″N 74°30′51.2″W
- Built: 1786
- NRHP reference No.: 76001187
- NJRHP No.: 2588

Significant dates
- Added to NRHP: June 3, 1976
- Designated NJRHP: December 22, 1975

The Mount Bethel Baptist Meetinghouse is a historic church located at the intersection of County Route 651 (King George Road, Mount Bethel Road) and Mountainview Road in the village of Mount Bethel in Warren Township, Somerset County, New Jersey, United States. Built in 1786, it was added to the National Register of Historic Places on June 3, 1976, for its significance in architecture and religion.

== History and description ==
The meetinghouse, a plain two and one-half story frame building, was built in 1786. Previously thought to have been built in 1761, disassembled in 1785, and moved to this location, the meetinghouse is now thought to have been built using some of the structure from an earlier building. It was built by the Mount Bethel Baptist congregation, which had been established in 1767 from the Scotch Plains Baptist Church. This congregation was the first in Somerset County. In 1960, it dedicated a new church building and abandoned this one.

== See also ==
- National Register of Historic Places listings in Somerset County, New Jersey
- List of the oldest buildings in New Jersey
