= Baker–Duderstadt Farm =

Historic house in New Jersey, United States

- U.S. National Register of Historic Places
- New Jersey Register of Historic Places
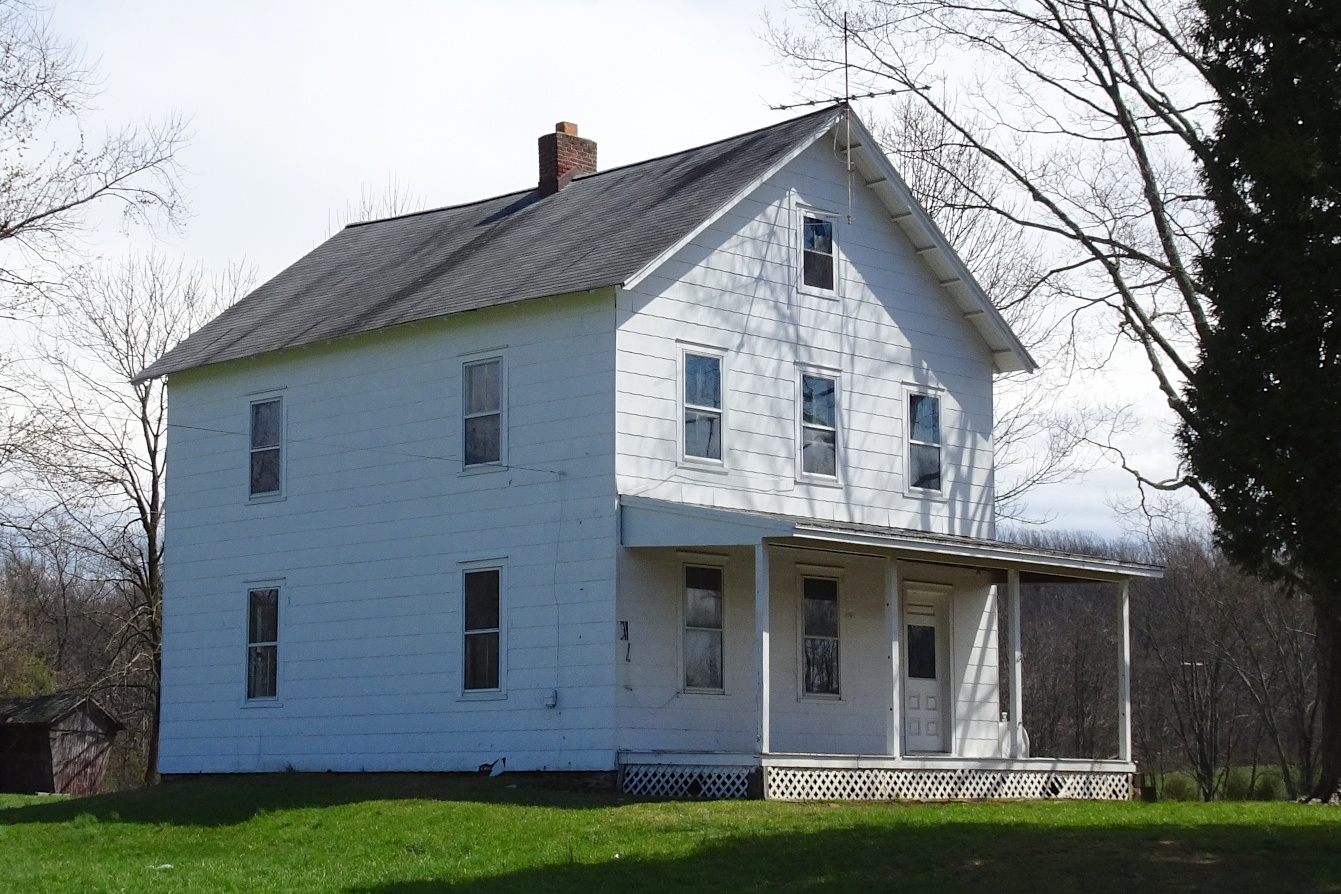
- Baker–Duderstadt farmhouse in 2016

- Location within Somerset County, New Jersey Location within New Jersey Location within the United States
- Location: 30 DuBois Road, Warren Township
- Coordinates: 40°38′03″N 74°29′50″W
- Area: 24 acres (9.7 ha)
- Architectural style: German: Half-timbered
- NRHP reference No.: 08001109
- NJRHP No.: 4262

Significant dates
- Added to NRHP: November 26, 2008
- Designated NJRHP: September 17, 2008

The Baker–Duderstadt Farm is a historic farmstead located at 30 DuBois Road in Warren Township of Somerset County, New Jersey. The 24-acre (9.7 ha) farm, along with five contributing buildings, was added to the National Register of Historic Places on November 26, 2008, for its significance in architecture and ethnic heritage.

== History ==
In the 1840s, John Baker, a German immigrant, purchased farmland here. According to family history, his son, George, built the Half-Timbered Barn between 1847 and 1849. In 1865, George sold the farm to his sister, Sophia, who was married to Charles Zimmer. They deeded the farm to their daughter, Kate, one part in 1884 and another in 1886. Kate was married to Hugo Duderstadt. Their son, George S. Duderstadt, born in 1879, later owned the farm and was active in the community. The Duderstadt family sold the farm to the county in 1998.

== Contributing properties ==
The Baker–Duderstadt Farmhouse, built in the early 20th century, is a two and one-half story building. The Half-Timbered Barn was built mid 19th century. It was constructed with a German, half-timbered style. The building is now protected with exterior plywood. It has a Jerkinhead roof. The nearby Large Barn is also contributing.

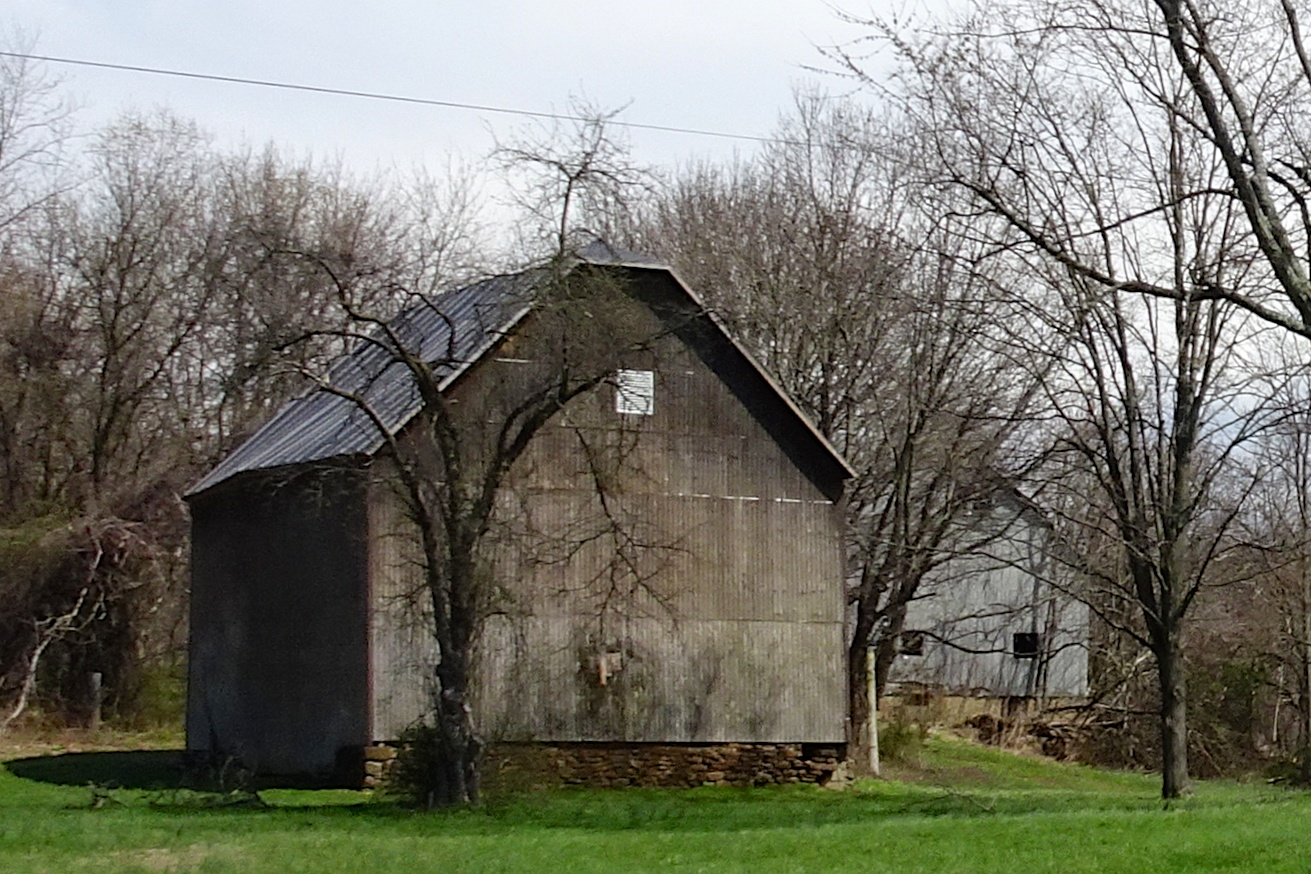
Half-Timbered Barn, foreground; Large Barn, background
