= Dock Watch Quarry =

Defunct rock quarry in New Jersey

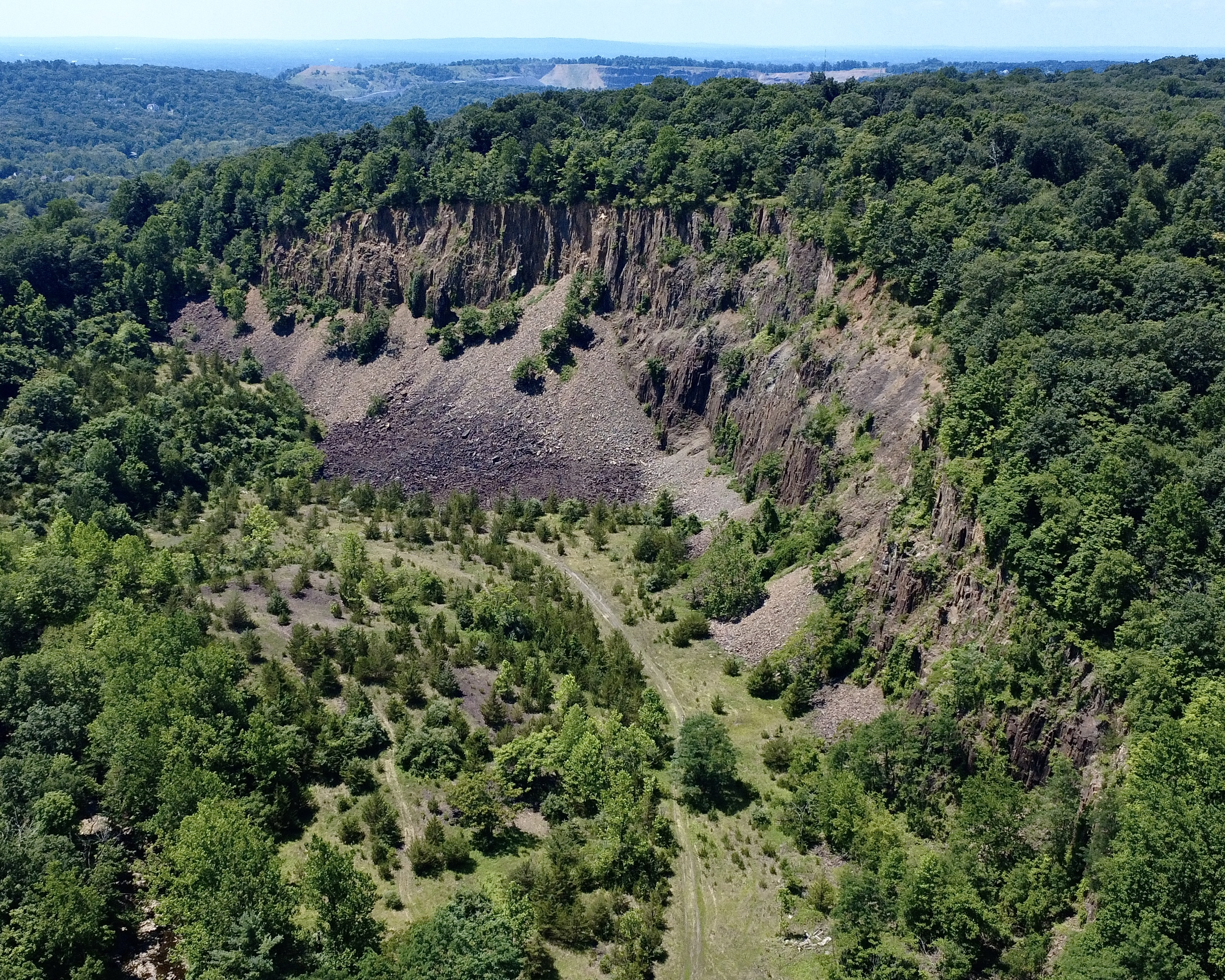
- Aerial view of the former Dock Watch Quarry (2025)

- Location in Somerset County, NJ
- Location: Warren & Bridgewater Townships, New Jersey; 40.60472°N 74.53639°W
- Products: Crushed traprock (Preakness Basalt)
- Active: 1930 – early 1980s
- Company: Dock Watch Hollow Quarry Pit, Inc. (defunct)

Dock Watch Quarry is an abandoned trap rock quarry located on Dock Watch Hollow Road in Warren Township, New Jersey. The site was excavated from the Preakness Basalt formation of the Second Watchung Mountain, and was active from 1930 until the early 1980s. Controversies surrounding the quarry's operations led to landmark legal decisions concerning nonconforming land use in New Jersey. Today, the site is preserved as an open space, and is recognizable by a basalt cliff face 280 feet (85 m) in height.

== Geology ==
The Watchung Mountains were formed approximately 200 million years ago during the late Triassic and early Jurassic periods. During the rifting of the supercontinent Pangaea, successive lava flows erupted into the Newark Basin, alternating with deposits of sedimentary rock. Over eons, the erosion of the softer sedimentary rock left the hard, resistant basalt layers as ridges.

The specific rock extracted at Dock Watch was Preakness Basalt, a fine-grained, dark-colored igneous rock specific to the Second Watchung Mountain and known commercially as trap rock. This material, composed primarily of plagioclase and augite, was highly valued as an aggregate for construction and road building due to its hardness and durability.

== Operation ==
=== Establishment and early operation ===
Prior to quarrying, Dock Watch Hollow was a sparse rural hamlet with small farms and mills dating to the 18th century. Harry E. Von Osten acquired a 20.47-acre (8.28 ha) tract straddling Warren and Bridgewater Townships in 1926, and began small-scale quarrying in 1930 following a geological survey that identified valuable trap rock deposits. Because operations predated township zoning ordinances enacted in 1952, the quarry gained a protected nonconforming use status once new land-use laws came into effect.

=== Commercial expansion ===
In 1950, Von Osten leased the full mineral rights to Roger Dealaman and Edward Mundock for large-scale commercial extraction. By 1956, Dock Watch Quarry Pit, Inc. was incorporated by Von Osten, Mundock, and John W. Mondak. Under this structure, the quarry reached peak production during the 1960s and early 1970s.

To extract the trap rock, workers would drill into the basalt face of the mountain, place explosive charges, and blast away large sections of rock. The dislodged material, a mix of hard traprock and softer shale, was then crushed into various sizes. A scalping screen sorted the crushed stone, which was then moved by a system of conveyor belts to storage piles before being loaded into trucks for delivery to customers.

== Legal battles ==
=== Moore v. Bridgewater Township (1961) ===
After new zoning laws in both Bridgewater and Warren townships forbade quarrying in 1952, regulators sought to prevent the quarry from expanding operations beyond the area being actively worked when the ordinances were passed. The quarry operators argued that their nonconforming use status covered the entire 20.47-acre (8.28 ha) parcel, not just the area then in operation. The New Jersey Appellate Division ruled in favor of the quarry, allowing full use of the property for mineral extraction.

=== Boundary adjustment (1971) ===
Prior to Moore, both Bridgewater and Warren townships initially denied that the quarry was located in their respective boundaries, attempting to avoid the responsibility and legal costs of regulating the site. In Moore, the court determined that 14.41 acres (5.83 ha) of the quarry lay in Bridgewater and 6.06 acres (2.45 ha) in Warren. This meant the quarry was subject to two different sets of ordinances and two different municipal governments, making effective and consistent regulation nearly impossible.

At the request of both townships, the New Jersey Legislature enacted special legislation on June 30, 1971, redrawing the municipal boundary to place the entire quarry within Warren Township. The quarry's operators would later allege that this change was part of a concerted effort to drive the quarry out of business by subjecting it to the harsher of the two townships' land-use regulations and putting it at a competitive disadvantage with the Houdaille Quarry, which was located in Bridgewater.

=== Dock Watch Hollow Quarry Pit, Inc. v. Township of Warren (1976–77) ===
Warren Township’s 1969 quarry ordinance imposed restrictions on extraction below road grade, buffer zones, blasting times, and reclamation requirements. These measures were motivated in large part by complaints of noise and pollution from the growing suburban community near the quarry. The quarry's owners argued these measures, particularly a ban on quarrying below road grade, would put much of the stone on the property out of reach, violating the protections of its nonconforming use status.

The Appellate Division delivered a mixed ruling, which was affirmed by the New Jersey Supreme Court: it upheld regulations on blasting below road grade, buffer areas, reclamation bonds, and landscape screening as legitimate exercises of police power, while invalidating municipal control over blasting times (preempted by state law) and bans on legal holidays. The decision became a landmark in New Jersey land-use law, empowering municipalities to impose significant regulations on legacy industrial sites to protect community interests.

== Closure and subsequent use ==
The quarry's operations ceased in the early 1980s. The upheld prohibition on quarrying below road grade was a major economic blow, rendering approximately half of the remaining stone reserves inaccessible, which had an estimated value of $26 million in 1976 dollars. In 2008, Somerset County purchased the abandoned 23-acre site for $822,000 using open-space funds, intending to develop a public recreation area. As of 2025, the site remains undeveloped and closed to the public.

=== Cell tower controversy ===
In 2011–12, proposals by Verizon and T-Mobile to install a 130-foot (40 m) cellular tower on the quarry floor ignited community opposition. A citizens’ coalition successfully argued the tower would mar scenic views and depress property values, leading the Warren Township Zoning Board to unanimously reject the application.
