= Kirch–Ford House =

Historic house in New Jersey, United States

- U.S. National Register of Historic Places
- New Jersey Register of Historic Places
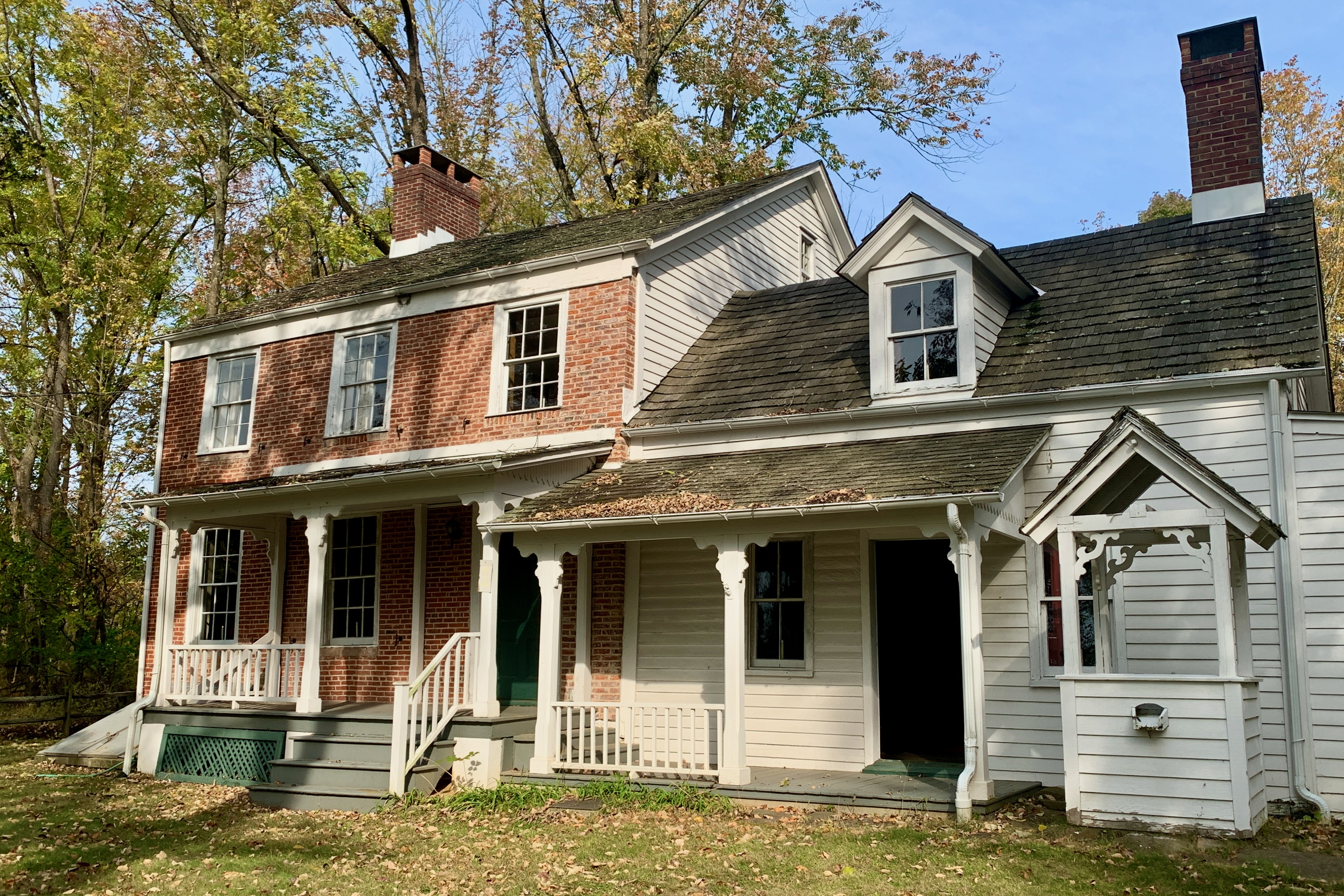
- Kirch–Ford House in 2020

- Location within Somerset County, New Jersey Location within New Jersey Location within the United States
- Location: 1 Reinman Road, Warren Township, New Jersey
- Coordinates: 40°38′03″N 74°30′11″W
- Architectural style: Federal
- NRHP reference No.: 88002033
- NJRHP No.: 2585

Significant dates
- Added to NRHP: October 20, 1988
- Designated NJRHP: September 15, 1988

The Kirch–Ford House, also known as the Kirch–Ford–Terrill House, is a historic farmhouse located at the corner Reinman Road and Mount Bethel Road in Warren Township in Somerset County, New Jersey. The house was added to the National Register of Historic Places on October 20, 1988, for its significance in architecture and exploration/settlement. It is now a historic house museum owned by the township.

== History and description ==
The oldest part of the house was likely built by Thomas Terrill Sr. between 1766 and 1774. Several additions were later made to the house, including a two and one-half story section built c. 1795. After Terrill's death, his widow Tryphena married William Ford. In 1830, the house was owned by Thomas Terrill Jr., who was the first Clerk of Warren Township. In 1857, the house was owned by John Kirch and it remained in the Kirch Family until 1978. In 1980, it was purchased by the township.

== See also ==
- National Register of Historic Places listings in Somerset County, New Jersey
