= Wagner Farm Arboretum =

Arboretum in Warren Township, New Jersey, United States

Coordinates: 40.6505°N 74.5058°W

- Interactive map of Wagner Farm Arboretum
- Website: Official website

Wagner Farm Arboretum is located at 197 Mountain Avenue, Warren Township in Somerset County, New Jersey. The arboretum spans 92.6 acres of open land where children and adults can participate in recreational events, classes, and volunteering experiences.

The arboretum began in 2001, when Warren Township purchased the Wagner Farm property. In 2002 the town's advisory committee suggested that the site be made into an arboretum, and a nonprofit organization to this end was formed in 2004.

In the Spring of 2007, Wagner Farm Arboretum collaborated with The Gardeners of Watchung Hills to open the Community Garden. It was also during this year that the Giving Garden Project (GGP) started and as of 2017 has distributed over 100,000 pounds of produce to the needy. The GGP partners with the Wagner Farm Arboretum “Growing To Give” educational program and the local elementary schools to help students plant seeds, learn about the environment and understand the social aspects of giving back to a community. The Children plant seeds in flats and tend them for several weeks in their classrooms. Then in the Spring, they plant the seedlings in the Giving Garden plots.

The Children's Garden broke ground in the fall of 2008 and has become a wonderful place for children and adults to explore and relax.

In 2014, Wagner Farm Arboretum celebrated its 10th year as a non-profit organization. Over the years since its incorporation, through the leadership of the members of the Board of Trustees, and with the tireless efforts of many volunteers and committee members, the Arboretum has made an impact to the community and environment one step at a time, one seedling at a time, and one helping hand at a time.

== Mission statement ==
To enrich, educate and inspire the community by increasing environmental awareness and recreational opportunities.

== See also ==
- List of botanical gardens in the United States
