= Berkeley Heights station =

NJ Transit rail station

Coordinates: 40°40′56.75″N 74°26′33.75″W

Berkeley Heights
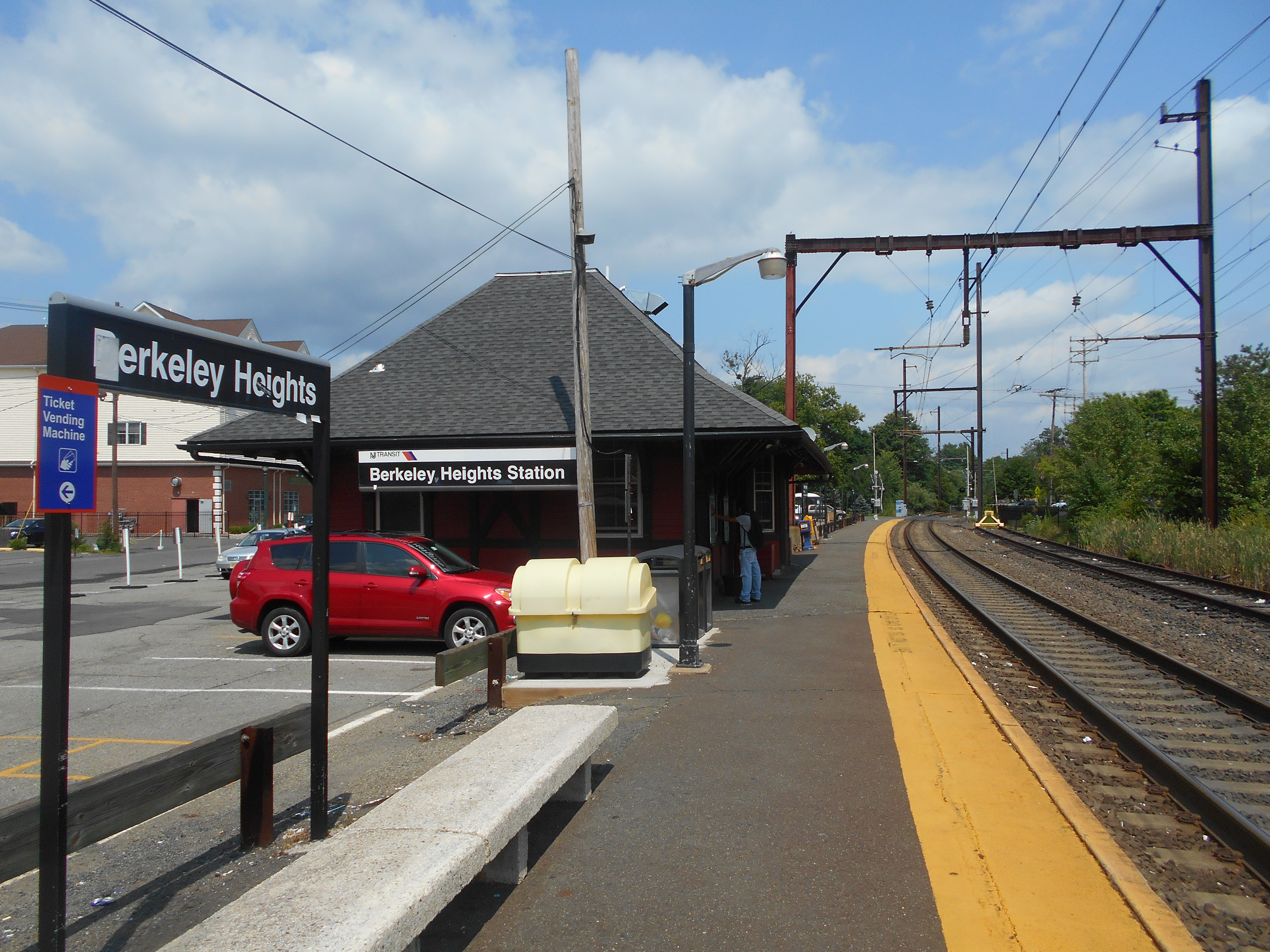
- The Berkeley Heights station facing towards the Lackawanna Railroad station depot.

General information
- Location: 161 Sherman Avenue, Berkeley Heights, New Jersey
- Platforms: 1 side platform
- Tracks: 2
- Connections: Lakeland Bus Lines: 78

Construction
- Accessible: No

Other information
- Station code: 706 (Delaware, Lackawanna and Western)
- Fare zone: 11

History
- Opened: January 29, 1872
- Rebuilt: 1899
- Electrified: January 6, 1931

Key dates
- 1960: Station agency closed

Passengers
- 2025: 309 (average weekday)
- Rank: 83 of 153

Services
Preceding station	NJ Transit	Following station
Gillette toward Gladstone	Gladstone Branch	Murray Hill toward New York or Hoboken
Former services
Preceding station	Delaware, Lackawanna and Western Railroad	Following station
Gillette toward Gladstone	Gladstone Branch	Murray Hill toward Hoboken
Location

Berkeley Heights is an active commuter railroad train station in the Township of Berkeley Heights, Union County, New Jersey. Operated by New Jersey Transit, the station services trains on the Gladstone Branch between Hoboken and Gladstone on weekdays.

== History ==
Berkeley Heights station opened on January 29, 1872, with the opening of the New Jersey West Line Railroad from Summit to Bernardsville. The Delaware, Lackawanna and Western Railroad built the current station depot in 1899. The station retained agent services until 1960.

== Station layout ==
The station has one low-level side platform, two tracks, and a standing station depot. The station is not compliant with the Americans with Disabilities Act of 1990.
