= Stirling station (NJ Transit) =

NJ Transit rail station

Coordinates: 40°40′29″N 74°29′36″W

Stirling
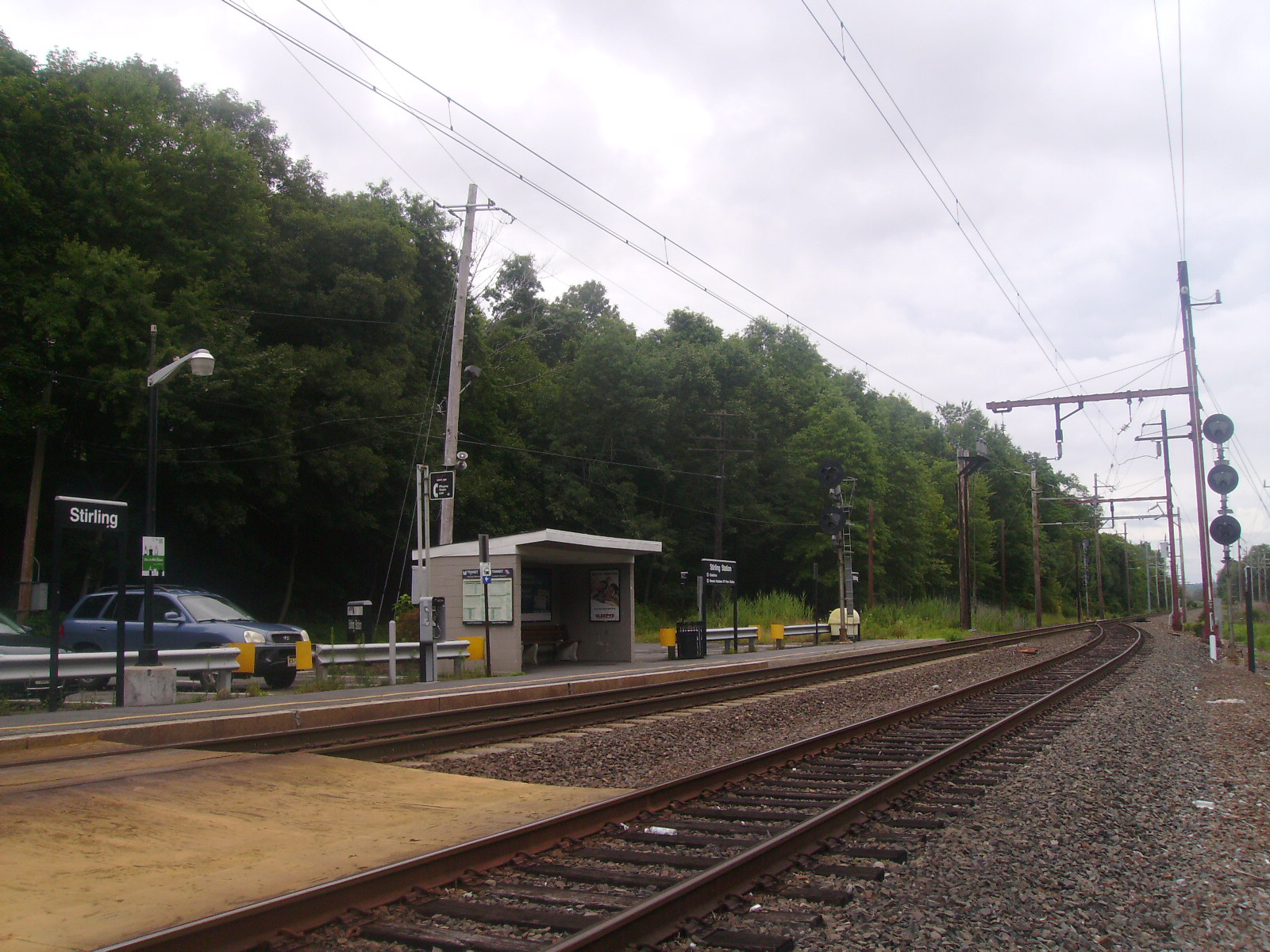
- Stirling station facing the lone station platform facing towards Gillette.

General information
- Location: 213 Central Avenue, Long Hill Township, New Jersey
- Owner: NJ Transit
- Platforms: 1 side platform
- Tracks: 2

Other information
- Station code: 708 (Delaware, Lackawanna and Western)
- Fare zone: 14

History
- Opened: January 29, 1872
- Rebuilt: 1877; August 1974
- Electrified: January 6, 1931

Key dates
- 1965: Station agency eliminated
- August 14, 1972: Station depot razed

Passengers
- 2025: 54 (average weekday)
- Rank: 140 of 153

Services
Preceding station	NJ Transit	Following station
Millington toward Gladstone	Gladstone Branch	Gillette toward New York or Hoboken
Former services
Preceding station	Delaware, Lackawanna and Western Railroad	Following station
Millington toward Gladstone	Gladstone Branch	Gillette toward Hoboken
Location

Stirling station is an active commuter railroad station in the Stirling neighborhood of Long Hill Township, Morris County, New Jersey. Located east of the grade crossing at Central Avenue, Stirling station serves trains of NJ Transit's Gladstone Branch, which operates between Gladstone and Hoboken on weekdays. The station consists of a single low-level side platform with a cinderblock shelter. With the station sitting on a rail siding, a wooden board exists to reach the main track for eastbound trains.

Stirling station opened on January 29, 1872 with the opening of the New Jersey West Line Railroad between Summit and Bernardsville. After the railroad abandoned use of the structure in 1965, the station depot at Stirling fell into a state of disrepair, resulting in several failed attempts to get the structure razed. After a failed deal to purchase the structure and offer it to another organization, the Erie Lackawanna Railroad demolished the depot on August 14, 1972 unannounced to local officials. After over a year of having no replacement structure, the New Jersey Department of Transportation agreed to construct a new shelter, which opened in August 1974.

== History ==
=== Opening and construction (1872–1877) ===
Stirling station was designed by architect Herbert Gray Torrey in 1877, with a 24-by-50-foot (7.3 m × 15.2 m) wooden frame design for the total of $1,375. The station also had a freight house and a greenhouse nearby. Torrey paid for the construction of the depot himself due to the railroad being short of finances.

=== Station demolition and replacement (1968–1974) ===
The Passaic Valley Chamber of Commerce proposed a study in January 1968 that would discuss what to do with the stations at Stirling, Gillette and Millington in the future. Locals felt that the railroad had done little in terms of upkeep at the Passaic Township stations, with members of the Boy Scouts looking at cleaning Millington station and the Jaycees painting and rehabilitating the depot at Gillette. The study eviscerated the conditions at Stirling station, which was in decrepit shape since the Erie Lackawanna abandoned the depot and the parking lot was a mess. The railroad felt that the railroad should be the ones required to do work the upkeep work on the three stations rather than local nonprofit groups. The Chamber of Commerce reiterated their efforts at the Passaic Township Committee in April 1968, releasing a four-page letter to the administration about what should happen at each of the township train stations. Their recommendation would be that the station depot at Stirling should be removed the property for being an "eyesore". They added their note that parking at all three stations should be upgraded, with 18 percent of the municipality's residents using the railroad for various purposes.

At a conference meeting in Passaic Township on April 15, the township noted that they had no money available for rehabilitation of the three stations. One of the local committeemen noted that he had talked with a colleague with Morris County who recommended that the municipality should look at alternatives to demolishing Stirling station. He added that the Erie Lackawanna Railroad might be able to offer $2,000 for repair work at the depot along with the township, with nonprofit organizations contributing another $1,000 towards rehabilitation. The committee stated that they would talk with the railroad, but that the cost to demolish the depot would be $250 with $1,700 for a new station shelter to replace the old structure. Passaic Township officials also convened with a local builder who stated the costs for rehabilitation would be worth more than demolition and replacement, but they did not specify how much it would cost.

In response to the township's requests to work on the station, the railroad told the municipality in October 1968 that the Erie Lackawanna Railroad planned to demolish the depot at Stirling. However, with the station serving as the headquarters of a section gang, the demolition would be held off until the railroad could relocate all the equipment and the people stationed to it. Railroad officials did not look favorably towards the Chamber of Commerce and their recommendation of volunteer help in help of erection of a new shelter for passengers to beautify the structure.

With the station depot still standing by July 1969, the Chamber of Commerce reached out to the New Jersey Department of Transportation (NJDOT) about stopping the railroad from removing the station and replacing it with a metal shelter. Despite interest by the township in demolishing the dilapidated structure, some people felt that the new metal structure was also a problem. The Chamber of Commerce wrote a letter stating that the railroad receiving a state subsidy was required to provide fair service to its customers and that if they could provide a proper facility for residents of Stirling. The local Jaycees group threw their support behind the Chamber of Commerce, creating a committee to help with their advice and sending another letter to NJDOT. The only response received from NJDOT was that an assistant had been assigned to the Stirling station situation.

The railroad stated that because of limited finances, the best they could offer is a used metal shed station, similar to the one at Gillette. Rudolph Denzler, the local expert of railroads in Stirling, noted that the station was in need of serious work. He noted that the roof at Stirling station leaked, the windows were broken and the station was in need of new coats of paint. Denzler added that the station was leaning on its west end and that the tiers and pilings would have to be replaced to keep the structure from failing completely. Another local builder said the costs for rehabilitation were no less than $4,000 based on a quick inspection made in 1968. He also asked three other builders to throw in their estimates, but only one other one did, saying it would be $5,500–$6,000 depending what was necessary and unexpected costs. Denzler added that if the railroad wanted to cooperate, they could look at opening a small store in part of a rehabilitated structure and have the rest of the structure used for commuters, but local officials seemed doubtful, saying it just did not have the money for it.

While the station depot's future was in doubt, locals began working on a new project at Stirling station, rehabilitating the park next to it. The neglected park, once having a pool and fountain, began restoration work under the direction of the newly-formed Passaic Township Conversation Commission in March 1970. The dead brush was to be cleared in favor of new soil for the park to be finish in time for Earth Day on April 22, 1970. Groups from Millington and Stirling, along with Passaic Township, got involved in the project, offering that the park, which had no name, would receive a name from a local school student. James Qualls, a third-grader at Millington Elementary School, won the contest with the new park named Turtle Rock Park. Katherine Jeffrey, an artist from Cokesbury, contributing a new sign that would be hung at the park entrance.

With status quo on the station depot by September 1970, the railroad suggested that the municipality burn the station down themselves in a letter to the Township Committee. The Erie Lackawanna stated that they could not start any work on demolition until at least mid-October 1970, and that the township should do it themselves if they wanted to speed up the structure's demolition. Firefighters in Passaic Township did not support the suggestion that the building should be demolished in a controlled blaze, stating that it would be detrimental to persons or properties in the area. Mayor Leon Israel Jr. added that the township would just rather wait until October and let the railroad do the demolition work themselves.

The Long Hill Women's Club joined the crusade to demolish the railroad station at Stirling in November 1971. The club members stated that they wanted the depot to be demolished and replaced with a new shelter that they were willing to help design and look up to their standards. By December 1971, word spread of the group's interest in the project and rumors swelled that the station would soon be demolished.

The momentum from the Long Hill Women's Club, which included letter and phone campaigns, came to a halt in late January 1972 when the Mayor of Passaic Township, Frank W. Gibson, offered to purchase the Stirling station and the freight station at Millington from the Erie Lackawanna for $1. Township officials offered that a section of the Millington freight station would be moved to Stirling Lake, where it would become a shelter. Another section would be sent to the municipal garage to use for storage. The station depot at Stirling would just be demolished. The township stated that they had no estimate on costs to demolish and move the stations, but it would be dealt with by municipal employees rather than an outside contractor. Thomas T. Taber, the chairman of the Morris County Board of Transportation, suggested that the depot, considered one of the originals of the New Jersey West Line Railroad, would have been replaced by a new station that would have combined both Stirling and Millington to offer better parking for commuters. By June 1972, no progress had been made on the offer, and a representative from the Long Hill Women's Club asked if other groups were putting pressure on the municipality to halt demolition.

On August 14, 1972, a bulldozer arrived at Stirling station to begin demolition of the station. Mayor Gibson, the Passaic Township Police Department and Township Clerk-Administrator Fred Rossi were never informed of the planned demolition. Erie Lackawanna Railroad officials confirmed that demolition was occurring that day to the press. Locals and the press watched as the depot came down, and a group of theater workers performed a publicity stunt during the demolition that the railroad workers agreed to. Before lunch, half of the depot was demolished and the crew then tied cables to the exterior of the depot, which allowed the bulldozer to pull the walls down. The roof was all that remained, attached to a center beam of the structure. They tied the cable to the center beam, but the cable snapped. The roof though fell soon after, ending the demolition process.

In the aftermath of the demolition, the railroad confirmed that they would be demolishing the Millington freight station that same week. The Township Committee stated that they were considering purchase of the Millington freight station and had declined to accept the Stirling station. They added that the Stirling station was offered to other civic organizations to repurpose the wooden structure or move it elsewhere, but that no one showed interest. Conflicting reports stated that the municipality offered Stirling station to the Smithville Inn near Atlantic City. The railroad's division engineer, Al Grzeski stated that they offered a contract in February 1972, but it had never been returned, so they went ahead with demolition. Grzeski stated that they had no plans to replace the station with any structure whatsoever once the debris had been cleared and that they would move on to the Millington freight depot once the process at Stirling was completed.

Wood from the former Stirling station was rescued by Robert Kaeser of Millington, who built a new coffee table for the Passaic Township Youth Center.

With no new shelter in place by January 1974, the Chamber of Commerce began offering to help discuss construction of one. Since the demolition of the station in August 1972, the platform remained opened and uncovered with no protection for riders. They reached out to Morris County's Freeholders in beginning a project and stated that a letter would be the best way to get the project moving. The letter worked and Morris County Board of Public Transportation Manager of Operations Frank Reilly announced in March 1974 that a new "see-through" metal station shelter would be built within six to ten weeks of the announcement by NJDOT. The new shelter was in place by August 1974, but instead of the "see-through" metal structure, they changed it to a cinderblock design because of concerns about vandalism at similar structures.

=== Proposed renovations (2021–present) ===
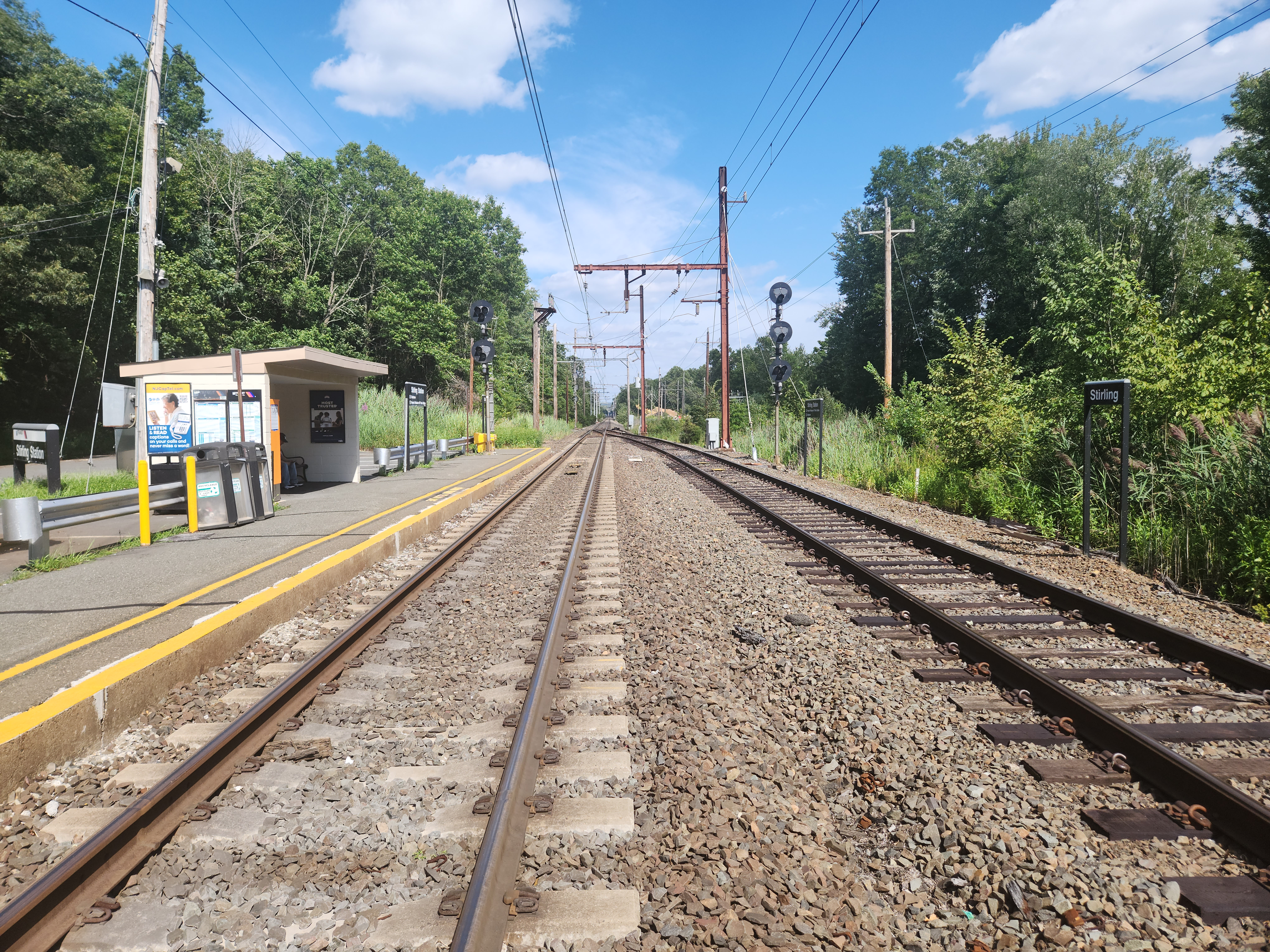
Stirling station in August 2023

Victor Verlezza, a local official in Long Hill Township, stated that he had interest in revitalizing the Stirling area as part of his election campaign. On November 9, 2021, Verlezza held a tour of the Stirling station with State Senator-elect Jon Bramnick, Assemblywoman Nancy Muñoz and Assemblywoman-elect Michele Matsikoudis to interest them in his revitalization campaign. Verlezza saw the stations at Summit and Westfield as models for what he wanted at Stirling. He felt upgrading the train station would be a step in achieving the goal. He added that the 1974 station shelter had been suffering from neglect and the growth of vegetation. The three politicians stated that they would talk to NJ Transit to see if they had money to upgrade Stirling station and if not, talk to other politicians about acquiring some money.

Verlezza and Deputy Mayor Guy Pierschia had a meeting with NJ Transit officials in April 2022 to offer proposals to the agency for an upgraded station at Stirling. Verlezza himself visited the Towaco station in Montville to look at it as a station and community to use as a model for Stirling. He added that the railroad would fund the project and that the municipality wanted significant upgrades, not just small incremental ones. He added that any renovations would likely cost $20 million just to have the station become compliant with the Americans with Disabilities Act. He added that the municipality was planning to add street lights on Main Avenue from Valley Road (County Route 512) to the Stirling station, extending from their current end at Railroad Avenue. Verlezza noted that he was looking for a clock to put at the station to help get people's attention at the station.

In December 2023, Verlezza noted that some funding for renovations to Stirling station was expected in the state budget for 2024. These upgrades would involve what would be allowed without requiring Americans with Disabilities Act-required designs. The original plan was to demolish the 1974 station shelter and build a new one but that would be held and upgrades would work around the structure. Bramnick stated that his staff was working on getting funding to be put in the budget for Stirling. He added that they were looking at upgrading Turtle Rock Park as part of the work in making Stirling a more appealing destination. By February 2024, the station shelter had become the home of a bee nest, the sidewalk was cracking with the growth of weeds and the guardrails were rusting. Verlezza asked for Bramnick to get $200,000 for the station upgrades. Verlezza stated that he and Township Administrator Randy Bahr would offer the costs of renovations and what they would entail.

== Station layout ==
The only physical facility at this station is a cinder-block-walled, shingle-roofed bench shelter facing the track. The low-level side platform connects to the bypass track via a walkway over the station track, allowing passengers to access trains on both tracks.
