= Millington station =

NJ Transit rail station

Millington
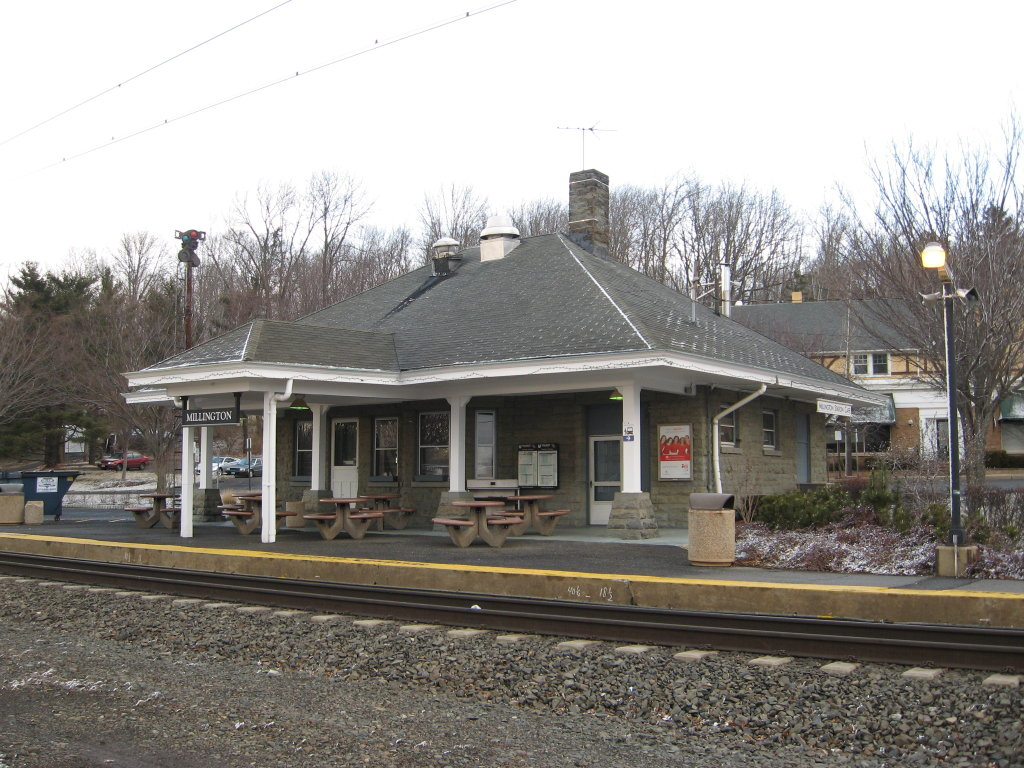
- The station at Millington, seen from across the tracks.

General information
- Location: 1931 Long Hill Road, Long Hill Township, New Jersey 07946
- Platforms: 1 low-level side platform
- Tracks: 1

Construction
- Parking: 114 spaces on Old Mill Road

Other information
- Station code: 710 (Delaware, Lackawanna and Western)
- Fare zone: 14

History
- Opened: January 29, 1872
- Rebuilt: 1901
- Electrified: January 6, 1931

Key dates
- July 1, 1981: Station agency closed

Passengers
- 2025: 74 (average weekday)
- Rank: 129 of 153

Services
Preceding station	NJ Transit	Following station
Lyons toward Gladstone	Gladstone Branch	Stirling toward New York or Hoboken
Former services
Preceding station	Delaware, Lackawanna and Western Railroad	Following station
Lyons toward Gladstone	Gladstone Branch	Stirling toward Hoboken
- Millington Station
- U.S. National Register of Historic Places
- New Jersey Register of Historic Places
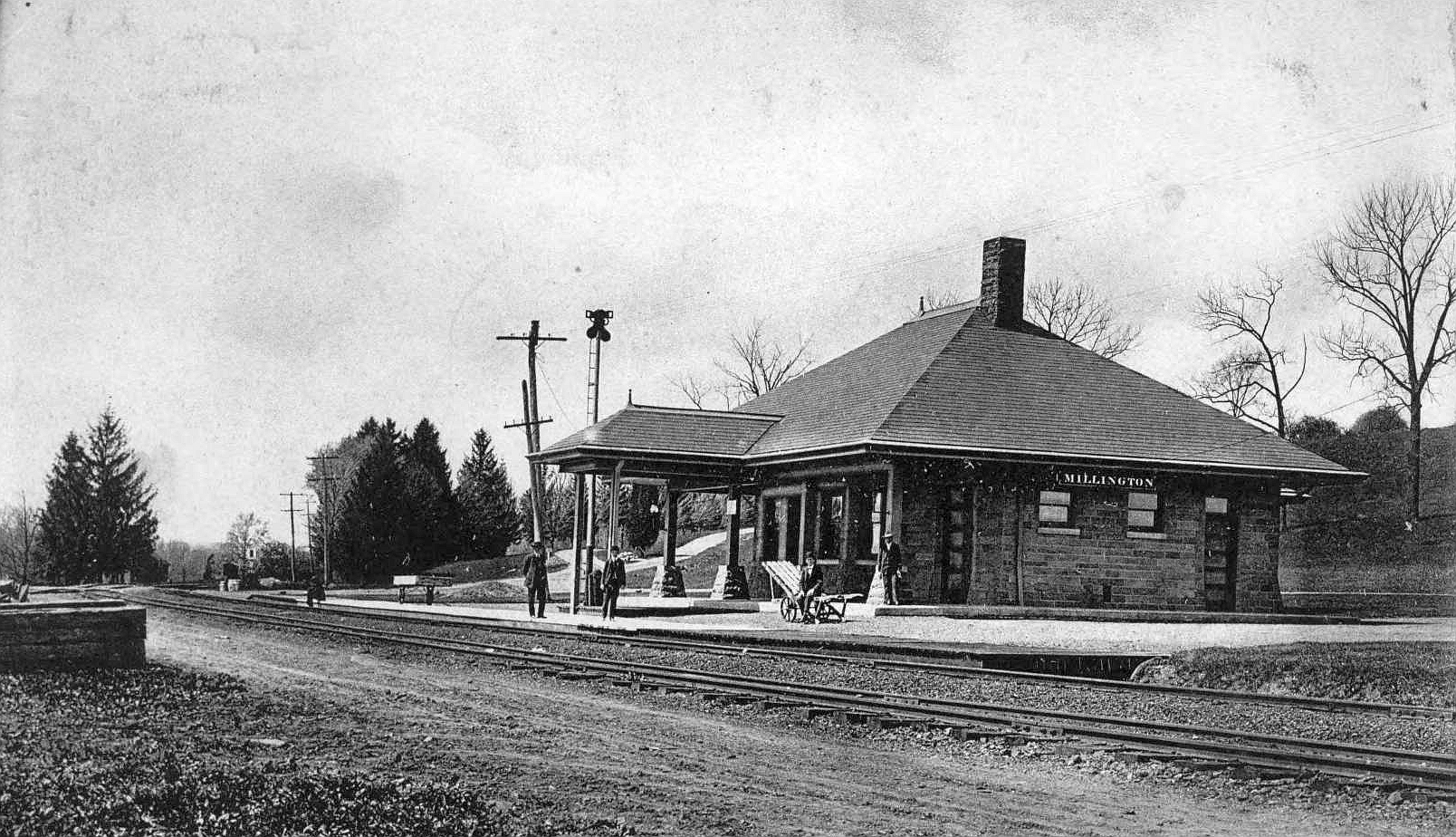
- Millington station in 1907
- Coordinates: 40°40′25″N 74°31′24.5″W
- NRHP reference No.: 84002767
- NJRHP No.: 2138

Significant dates
- Added to NRHP: June 22, 1984
- Designated NJRHP: March 17, 1984
Location

Millington is a NJ Transit station in the Millington section of Long Hill Township in Morris County, New Jersey, United States, located at the intersection of Oaks Road and Division Avenue. It is served by the Gladstone Branch of the Morris and Essex Lines, and is one of three stops in Long Hill Township.

== History ==
This station opened on January 29, 1872. The station building of stone-masonry construction was built in 1901 by the Delaware, Lackawanna and Western Railroad and houses the Millington Station Cafe. In 1984, it was listed in the New Jersey Register of Historic Places and National Register of Historic Places as part of the Operating Passenger Railroad Stations Thematic Resource.

== Station facilities and layout ==
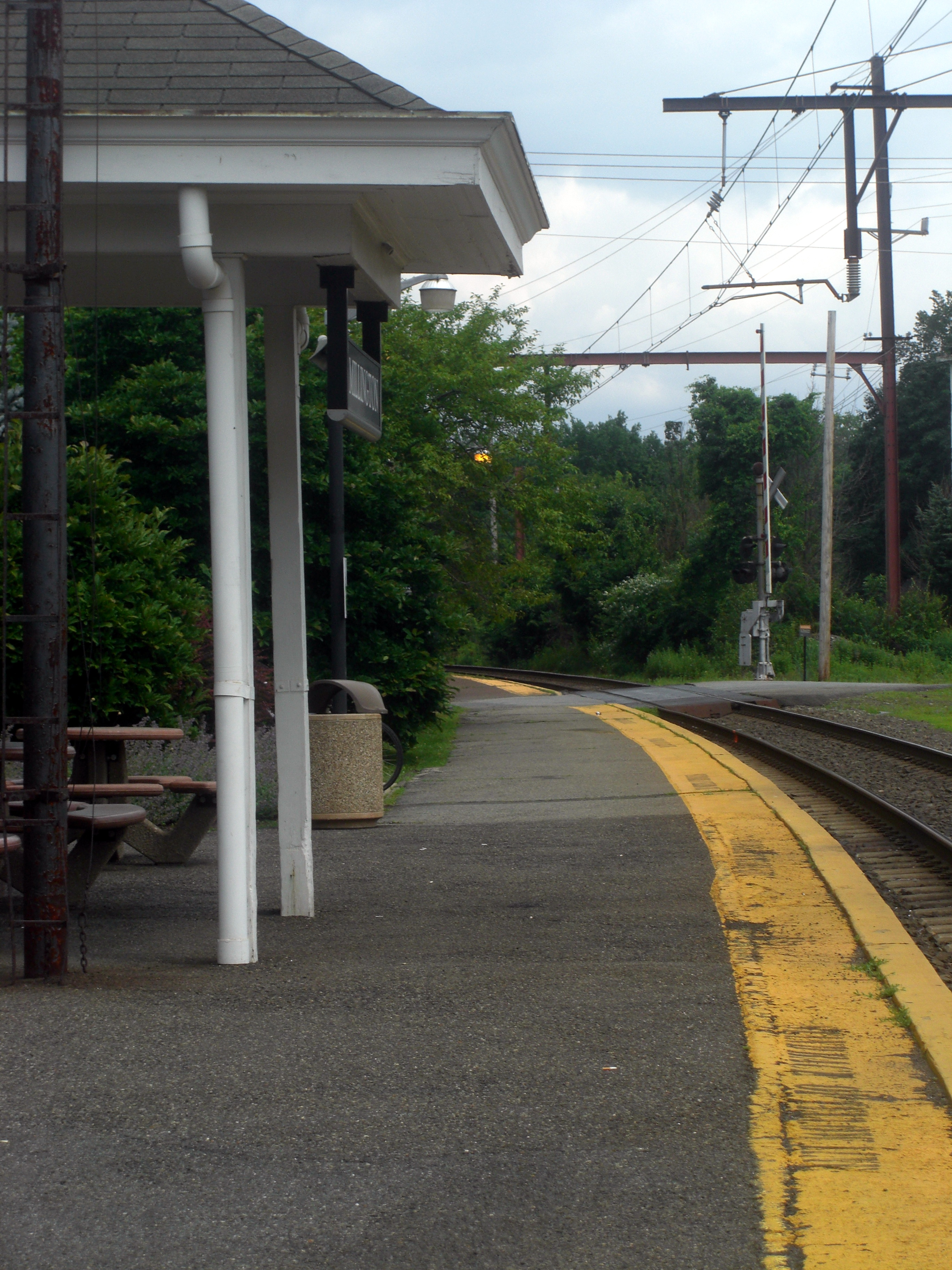
The station platform at Millington

The station has one low-level asphalt side platform that is not accessible under the Americans with Disabilities Act of 1990. No buses serve the station, which does not have a station shelter except for the canopy. A 114-space parking lot owned by Long Hill Township is located south of the station. The spaces require a parking permit or daily parking pass. The Township of Long Hill utilizes ParkMobile, a phone app, for daily Train Station Parking. Parking permits or day passes are only required on weekdays, as parking is free on weekends. The station also has a single ticket machine and bicycle racks.

== See also ==
- List of New Jersey Transit stations
- National Register of Historic Places listings in Morris County, New Jersey
