= New Jersey West Line Railroad =

Railroad organisation

Line of the New Jersey West Line Railroad (unfinished section in grey)

The New Jersey West Line Railroad was a proposed railroad running east and west across Northern New Jersey, of which the only part constructed was what is now the Gladstone Branch of New Jersey Transit between Summit and Bernardsville. Some other remains of it can be found in Summit, Millburn, and Union Township.

== The proposed railroad ==
The earliest charter was granted by the New Jersey Legislature in March 1865 for the Passaic Valley and Peapack Railroad, which was to run from "some point in the county of Union or the county of Essex" via Springfield Township (Union), New Providence, and Basking Ridge to Peapack. The planned route would run between the Morris and Essex Railroad (M&E) in the north and the Central Railroad of New Jersey in the south.

The charter was amended in 1867 to continue the road west to the Delaware River at any point between Holland and Frenchtown. In 1868, a further amendment allowed the company to vary the route up to three miles from the planned route. In 1869, the railroad was authorized to build a bridge to Pennsylvania near Milford, although there was no existing railroad on the Pennsylvania side near Milford. It was speculated that the Passaic Valley and Peapack were being manipulated as part of some larger plan, but money for the road had been raised by the common procedure of selling bonds to investors in the towns along the line, so ostensibly it was under local control.

The company's name was changed in February 1870 to the New Jersey West Line Railroad. By this date, the route of the first segment had been decided. From Bernardsville to Summit it followed the present-day Gladstone Branch. It then crossed to the north of the Morris and Essex Railroad to pass through the northwestern part of Summit, and crossed the M&E again east of Millburn. From there it would run through Union and enter Newark from the south.

Construction began in 1870. The bondholders entered disagreements with management in June 1870, slowing progress. In the later part of 1871 the bondholders welcomed in Asa Packer and others involved with the Lehigh Valley Railroad, a Pennsylvania coal carrier that wanted to secure its own route from Easton, Pennsylvania to Tidewater. As part of the plan Packer began buying shorefront land in Perth Amboy for a coal port that he said would be reached by a branch line.

A test train was run between Summit and Bernardsville in December 1871 and newspapers reported that a switch would be laid to allow NJWL trains to run to the M&E station in Summit. Passenger service on this segment, now part of the Gladstone Branch, began on January 29, 1872, and freight service began the next month.

In February 1872 the company under Asa Packer's control obtained authorization to continue east into Hudson County to the Hudson River, and to build a branch west to Phillipsburg (opposite Easton). However, later the same year the Lehigh Valley Railroad obtained a charter for the Easton and Amboy Railroad which was immediately put under construction, opening in 1875. Its route south of the Central of New Jersey was considered superior due to its easier grades and curves. In June 1872, the contentious bondholders of the NJWL voted Packer out.

The future of the NJWL now appeared to be that of a rural branch line dependent on the Morris and Essex connection at Summit as its only connection to the national rail network. However, the partially built line to Newark was not yet abandoned. Advertising for a residential development called Wyoming, between Millburn and Maplewood in September 1872 mentioned not only the Morris and Essex station but also a station on the New Jersey West Line, "now rapidly completing". It is thought that the Panic in September 1873 killed any last hopes of completion of the line.

== Unfinished section in Summit, Millburn, and Union ==
Unused New Jersey West Line grade in Millburn

Although only the section between Bernardsville and Summit was opened by the New Jersey West Line, right-of-way was acquired from Summit to Newark and construction was started. To varying degrees this part was graded, bridge abutments were built, wooden trestles were installed, and portions of track may have been laid. Work stopped by 1873, but the property was not sold off until 1901. Later development has obscured much of the right of way. A 1907 DL&W survey of the right of way from Newark to West Summit (now Murray Hill) is maintained on the U.S. National Park Service website.

In Summit, the crossing of the Morris and Essex was at a point south of Kent Place Boulevard and west of High Street. At this time, the Morris and Essex ran north of its present alignment, so the crossing is on the north side of the present railway just east of the point where the Gladstone Branch diverges. Crossing Kent Place Boulevard, the New Jersey West Line alignment ran through what is now school grounds (the current location of Summit High School), across Morris Avenue, and behind the houses on the south side of Bedford Road, where it is a public easement and marked on Summit's tax map as "FORMER NJ WESTLINE R.R." https://www.cityofsummit.org/176/Maps, Sheet 12.

East of Woodland Avenue, Llewellyn Road follows the right of way, and east of Bellevue Avenue, a 1929 map shows another small street called Lyric Lane also on the right of way. East of Summit Avenue, an embankment is easy visible south of Hillcrest Ave close to the way to Fernwood Road, and there is a small brick arch spanning a small stream south of the intersection of Hillcrest and Woodmere Drive. The line took a turn southeast just before reaching the Morris and Essex Turnpike, through the deep cut through which Woodfern Road runs, and entered Millburn just north of Hobart Gap Road. To some extent all this route in Summit follows property lines.

In Millburn, the New Jersey West Line routing through Short Hills is almost totally obscured. Short Hills was developed starting in 1874, right after the New Jersey West Line failed, so its street plan bears almost no relation to the path of the railroad. The route, however, is shown on a map prepared for the Lehigh Valley Railroad in the 1920s. The New Jersey West Line would have crossed south of the junction of Hobart Gap Road and White Oak Ridge Road, and a cut is visible on both sides of West Road north of Hobart Gap Road. An embankment extends from the north side of Hobart Avenue from near the intersection of Lakeview Avenue to the intersection of Coniston Road and Hemlock Road; the house on the property is angled to follow the grade. It then would have gone north to run along the south side of Western Drive, which was named for the New Jersey West Line with a station location around Taylor Place or Highland Avenue. It followed the tree line north of Christ Church east of Highland Avenue, and there is a cut visible east of Montview Avenue south of its intersection with Barberry Lane. Another cut begins east of the end of York Terrace and extends to the west side of Old Short Hills Road about midway between Nottingham Road and Hillside Avenue. Early maps naturally show the New Jersey West Line property, but the chances of it being built diminished quickly as the 1870s went on.

Some remains can be found east of Glen Avenue. First the curving southern end of Woodcrest Avenue follows the New Jersey West Line alignment, and this curve continues to a dry-stone wall that can be seen on the west side of Brookside Drive (park in the dirt space on the east side of the road to view it). From here a timber trestle was constructed across the valley that was known as the Ghost Bridge (shown here ) since no track was ever laid on it. East of the river, the graded right of way can still be seen inside the South Mountain Reservation. It starts as an embankment and continues into a wide cut, passing the site of an old quarry, continuing past the present-day parking lot opposite Lackawanna Place, and continuing straight to Glen Avenue, and onward as a property line to the Morris and Essex tracks. The part from the quarry to the Morris and Essex had track laid for some decades into the early 20th century as a freight siding serving the quarry, so it is well preserved.

The remaining part in Millburn south of the Morris and Essex is totally obscured by later construction, but across the border in Union are two interesting remains. First a street named West Line Avenue runs from the river to Valley Street, and then on the other side of Valley Street a pair of streets called East Side Avenue and West Side Avenue flank the right of way for the short distance down to Springfield Avenue. The neighborhood around these latter two streets is formed entirely of narrow streets and small lots. Its relation to the New Jersey West Line is not known.

East of Springfield Avenue the right of way is impossible to discern today. It ran southeast following generally Vauxhall Road and crossed the river into Hillside near Brookside Avenue, Union, where there were traces of a bridge abutment. It then turned northeast, crossing modern U.S. Route 22 near Liberty Avenue and entering Newark just west of Elizabeth Avenue. The proposed route in Newark is obscure.

== Completed section: Gladstone Branch ==
The operating segment of the New Jersey West Line did not have enough income to pay its costs, as it served small farms and an undeveloped region, and the company fell into receivership in 1878. The property was foreclosed on and sold on August 3, 1878 an official of the Delaware, Lackawanna and Western Railroad, its only connection, for $51,580. The new company was called the Passaic and Delaware Railroad. For many years, the Gladstone Branch was known to railroad employees as the "P and D", but it was run by the DL&W from 1878 onward as a branch of the Morris and Essex. The DL&W formally leased the line on November 1, 1882.

The DL&W obtained a charter in 1890 for the Passaic and Delaware Extension Railroad, intended to continue the branch to Gladstone. The extension was built in only six months, opening in October. The extension includes a truly short tunnel west of Far Hills. Despite the grand company title, the DL&W never tried to extend the line farther west to the Delaware River.

(This was the second railroad to reach Peapack and Gladstone, the Rockaway Valley Railroad having opened in April the same year built its line north from White House on the CNJ. It is indicative of the railroad fever of the 1890s that such a small village would be the object of two railroads, and that a wealthy carrier like the DL&W would react so quickly to the plans of a small and financially shaky "competitor". The RV was abandoned in 1913.)

The Gladstone Branch was converted to electric passenger operation in January 1931, but freights continued to run on steam until dieselization in March, 1953. Passenger trains ran to the terminal at Hoboken. The usual off-peak service for about six decades in the mid-20th Century consisted of a pair of Gladstone cars that were cut in and out of mainline Morris and Essex trains at Summit. The line was amazingly rural in nature, consisting of a single main track with passing sidings and hand-thrown switches worked by train crews. After New Jersey Transit took over operations in 1983 some of the sidings were removed, severely limiting reverse-peak services, and the practice of cutting cars in and out of trains ended, requiring passengers to change trains, usually at Summit. Beginning in June 1996, some peak trains were operated directly to and from Penn Station, as part of the Midtown Direct service. Any expansion of current service levels is problematic due to lack of storage space at Gladstone.

== Sources ==
- Taber, Thomas Townsend (1977). The Delaware, Lackawanna & Western Railroad in the Nineteenth Century. Muncy, Pennsylvania: Privately printed. OCLC 9846964.
- Taber, Thomas Townsend; Taber, Thomas Townsend III (1980). The Delaware, Lackawanna & Western Railroad in the Twentieth Century. Vol. 1. Muncy, PA: Privately printed. ISBN 0-9603398-2-5.
- Taber, Thomas Townsend; Taber, Thomas Townsend III (1981). The Delaware, Lackawanna & Western Railroad in the Twentieth Century. Vol. 2. Muncy, PA: Privately printed. ISBN 0-9603398-3-3.
- Maps and atlases in the public libraries of Summit and Millburn.
- New York Times, June 20, 1870; November 29, 1871; June 6, 1872; September 30, 1872.
