= Elizabeth station (Central Railroad of New Jersey) =

American railroad station

ELIZABETH
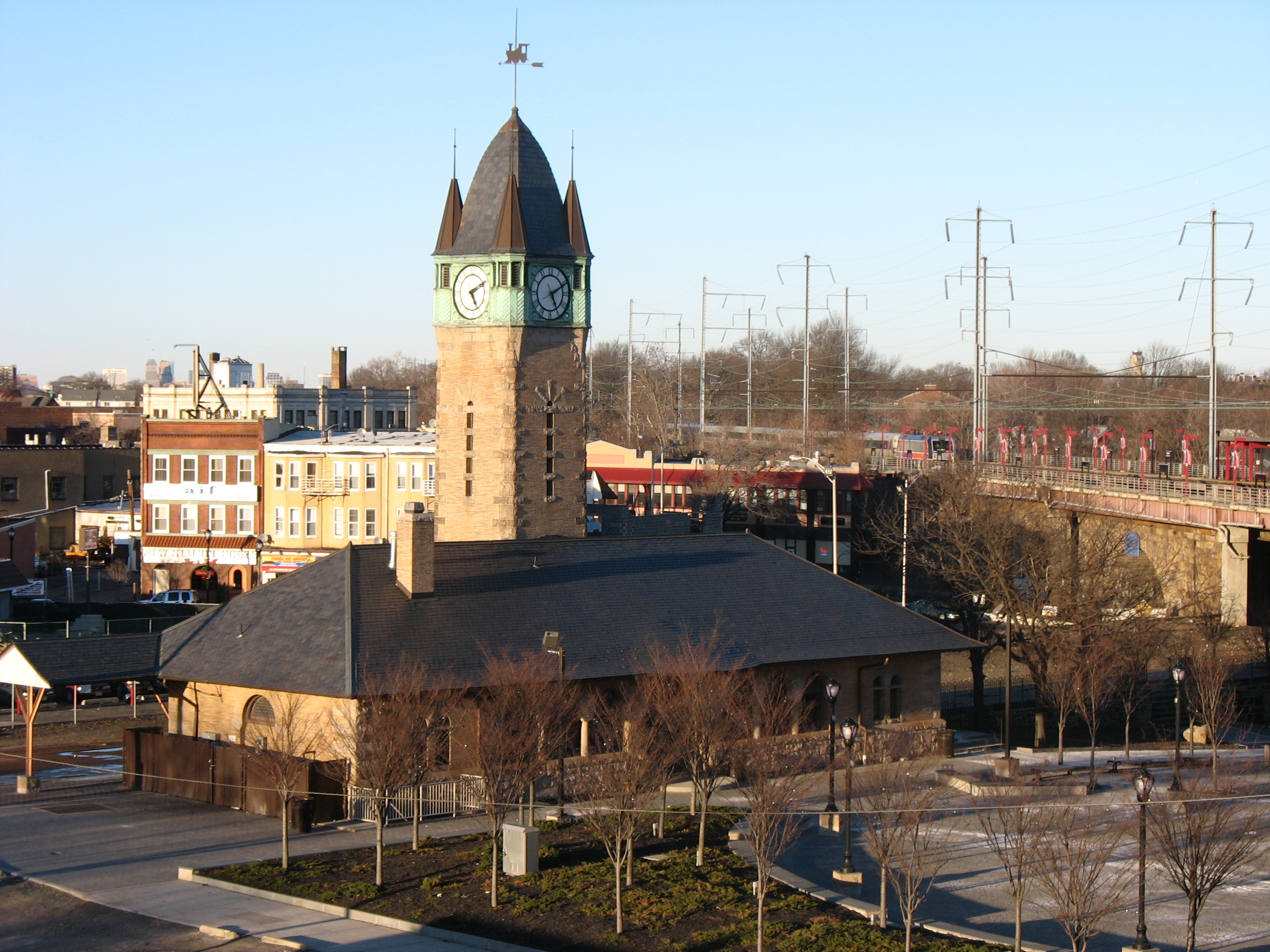
- The former Central Railroad of New Jersey station, with the current Elizabeth station in the background.

General information
- Location: 14 Julian Place, Elizabeth, New Jersey 07028
- Coordinates: 40.667149°N 74.216448°W
- Platforms: 2
- Tracks: 4

History
- Opened: January 1, 1839
- Closed: August 6, 1978

Former services
Preceding station	Conrail	Following station
Elmora Avenue toward Cranford	Cranford–Bayonne Shuttle	Elizabethport toward East 33rd Street
Preceding station	Central Railroad of New Jersey	Following station
Roselle–Roselle Park toward Scranton	Main Line	Jersey City Terminus
Roselle–Roselle Park toward Scranton	Main Line	Elizabethport toward Jersey City
Roselle–Roselle Park toward Somerville	Somerville – Jersey City Local	West 8th Street toward Jersey City
Elmora toward Somerville	Somerville – Jersey City Local	Elizabethport toward Jersey City
Preceding station	Baltimore and Ohio Railroad	Following station
Plainfield toward Chicago	Main Line	Jersey City Terminus
Plainfield toward Philadelphia: Chestnut St. or Reading Terminal	Philadelphia – Jersey City Local	Jersey City Terminus
- Elizabeth Station
- U.S. National Register of Historic Places
- Interactive map of Elizabeth Station
- Location: Morris Ave., and Broad St., Elizabeth, New Jersey
- Coordinates: 40°40′1.7″N 74°12′59.2″W
- Area: 1.3 acres (0.53 ha)
- Built: 1893
- Architect: Bruce Price
- Architectural style: Roanesque, Victorian Romanesque
- MPS: Operating Passenger Railroad Stations TR
- NRHP reference No.: 84002825
- Added to NRHP: September 29, 1984
Location

Elizabeth is a disused train station in Elizabeth, New Jersey. It was built by the Central Railroad of New Jersey (CNJ) in 1893. It is adjacent to NJ Transit's Elizabeth station on the Northeast Corridor. That station was built and owned by the Pennsylvania Railroad; in the era of private operation passengers could transfer between the two. The CNJ right-of-way in Elizabeth is unused, and passenger trains which served the former CNJ mainline (NJT's Raritan Valley Line service) bypass Elizabeth via the Aldene Connection on their way to Newark Penn Station. The station has been renovated and used as commercial space.

== Major named trains ==
The station was on CNJ's main line and was also utilized by B&O and Reading Railway trains which terminated at CNJ's Jersey City terminal, where ferry service to New York was available.

- Baltimore and Ohio (routes west beyond Washington, DC):
  - Capitol Limited, Cincinnatian, Columbian, Metropolitan Special, National Limited and others
- Central Railroad of New Jersey & Reading Railway (route to Bethlehem, Allentown, Reading and Harrisburg):
  - Harrisburg Special and Queen of the Valley
- Reading Railway (route to West Trenton and Philadelphia):
  - Crusader and Wall Street

== Status ==
The CNJ station suffered from a freight train wreck on November 4, 1972, when a boxcar derailed and pulled several other cars into the canopy. Although the buildings and freight cars were damaged, there were no injuries. The station has been listed in the New Jersey Register of Historic Places and National Register of Historic Places since 1984 and is part of the Operating Passenger Railroad Stations Thematic Resource.

There are plans to redesign the public space and create a transit plaza between the CNJ and NJT stations. Funding was approved in 2018.

The proposed Union County Light Rail, which would have connected midtown Elizabeth with Newark Airport, would have had its western terminus at this station. The station for this line would have been referred to as Midtown to distinguish from the other stations in Elizabeth on this line. The plan has been replaced by the Union go bus expressway, a proposed bus rapid transit system between Garwood and the airport.
