= Garwood station =

NJ Transit rail station

Garwood
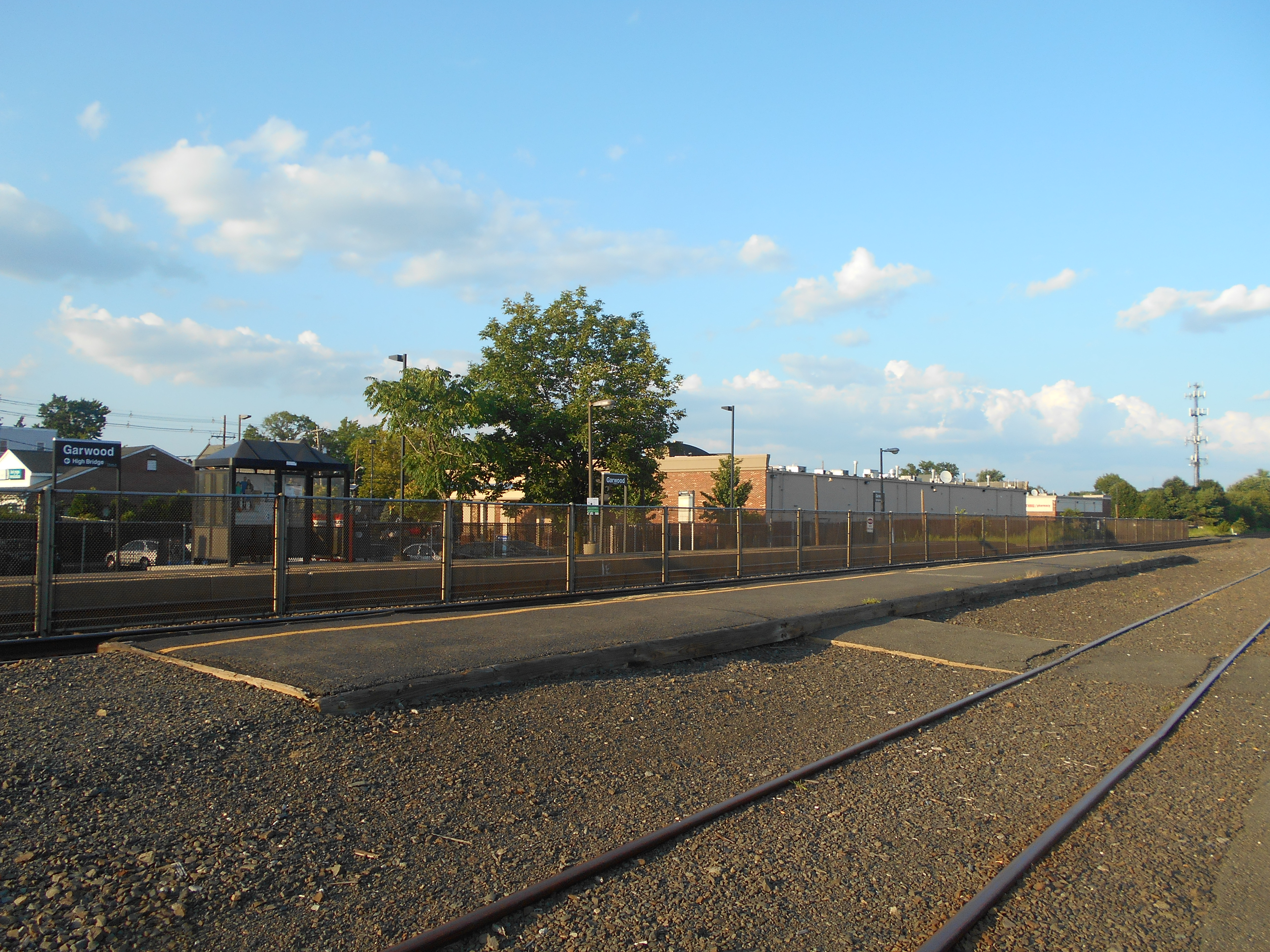
- Garwood station platforms in August 2014.

General information
- Location: Center Street between North and South Avenues, Garwood, New Jersey
- Coordinates: 40.6526°N 74.3249°W
- Line: Raritan Valley Line
- Distance: 17.3 miles (27.8 km) from Jersey City
- Platforms: 2 low-level side platforms
- Tracks: 2
- Connections: NJ Transit Bus: 59, 113

Construction
- Parking: No public parking for commuters
- Cycle facilities: Yes
- Accessible: No

Other information
- Fare zone: 8

History
- Opened: August 1892
- Former names: Garwood–Aeolian (1901–)

Key dates
- June 30, 1976: Station depot burned

Passengers
- 2025: 151 (average weekday)
- Rank: 106 of 153

Services
Preceding station	NJ Transit	Following station
Westfield toward High Bridge	Raritan Valley Line	Cranford toward Newark Penn or New York
Former services
Preceding station	Central Railroad of New Jersey	Following station
Westfield toward Somerville	Somerville – Jersey City Local	Cranford toward Jersey City
Location

Garwood station is an active commuter railroad station in the eponymous borough of Garwood, Union County, New Jersey. Located east of the Center Street overpass, the station serves trains of NJ Transit's Raritan Valley Line between High Bridge station and Newark Penn Station. Some trains continue east to New York Penn Station. Garwood station consists of two low-level side platforms, resulting in it being inaccesible for those with disabilities. The station also contains plexiglass shelters on each platforms.

Garwood station opened with the construction of the namesake Garwood in 1892, a new community between Westfield and Cranford, which would be for the construction of multiple factories on both sides of the aforementioned townships. The new community would have streets and a new train station built by the Central Railroad of New Jersey to serve 600 new employees. Garwood station opened on an operating basis in August 1892, but the depot was incomplete until late October. In 1901, as a part of an agreement with the Aeolian Organ Company, the railroad renamed the stop as Garwood–Aeolian, a decision that would prove controversial locally. The station depot burned in a suspected arson on the morning of June 30, 1976.

== History ==
Construction began in March 1892 on the construction of a new company town on land owned by Westfield and Cranford Townships. This new community would be based on the construction of two new factories: a new steel wheel works in Westfield and the Hall Automatic Signal Works in Cranford, 1,000 feet (300 m) east of a new railroad station built on the Central Railroad of New Jersey main line. The two companies would employ about 600 people to serve them. Stakes were placed to denote the construction locations of the new community and the location of the new railroad station.

With construction progressing in August 1892, clearings were created for the construction of the American Steel Wheel Company. The company, based in Plainfield, was operated by the Mayor of Plainfield, J.C. Paul. The new property would be 300 acres (120 ha) and named Garwood, in honor of the treasurer of American Steel Wheel. The new buildings would cost $100,000 (1892 USD) to build. The Hall buildings would cost another $80,000 to build, with construction done Pond Machine of Plainfield. The expectation was that the new buildings would be open within 90 days. The railroad station at Garwood became operational in August 1892, with a ticket agent and station operator prepared to take over the station depot. The foundation for the Hall Automatic Signal Company was in place and work on the American Steel Wheel Company building was about to start. At this point, other manufacturers were interested in building in Garwood, taking advantage of the available land. 2,000 lots for building new houses were in place for prospective buyers. 25 acres (10 ha) were withheld for a third manufacturer that had plans to build a new business.

Completion of the new station depot came in October 1892. By December, construction on the Hall building had finished the frame of the factory, while the American Steel Wheel building was almost up to a full frame. 56 houses were under construction on the open lots available by the Garwood Land Improvement Land Company. Streets were also graded and engineers began shaping other structures.

=== Aeolian controversy (1901) ===
In 1901, the construction of the Aeolian Organ Company opened a brand new factory in Garwood, joining the American Steel Wheel, Hall Automatic Signal and C. and C. Electric Light Company, who were already in operation. When they proposed a new factory, the railroad agreed to let the area be named "Aeolian" on the Westfield side of the community. This would also include renaming of the railroad station. However, the other manufacturing concerns were not consulted and opposed the renaming of the area as Aeolian, feeling it was unfair that the Aeolian Organ Company was getting free advertising compared to the other companies. This was also a concern of local citizens as well. The C. and C. Electric Company felt that the renaming of the station to "Aeolian" would affect their bottom line, noting their promotion of their work in Garwood.

On January 19, 1901, the railroad held up their end of the deal and removed signage for Garwood, replacing it with a sign for "Aeolian". With the station name changed, officials at the electric company threatened to move their factory out of Garwood. By January 25, a sign for Garwood had been added to the depot next to the "Aeolian" name. This change attracted attention from locals. However, the staff on the railroad trains regularly called the station Garwood to the passengers. The fighting over the name continued into March 1901 as the station retained both names. The signs on the Westfield side of Garwood station stated the name of "Garwood" while the signs at the Cranford side noted "Aeolian". The Central Railroad of New Jersey felt that it was easier to let each party involved in the fighting decide what they chose to call the station, but kept to the original agreement with the Aeolian Organ Company.

In February 1901, the railroad evicted the post office from the station depot at Garwood by March 1. With the eviction of the post office and the ongoing fight over the station name, a post office was built in Garwood and moved into the Aeolian section. The decision of having multiple names on the station also resulted in the new Central Railroad station at Roselle becoming Roselle on the south side of the tracks and Roselle Park on the north side of the tracks. This would also come up with the decision making over the Lincoln station in Middlesex County in 1913.

The construction of the Aeolian Organ Company drove construction of more houses in Garwood, with 50 new residences going up by May 1901. The company also announced that they would build a clubhouse for their employees. 20 more residences and an extension on the building were under construction by October 1901.

A new freight station opened at Garwood station in July 1901, replacing services at Westfield station, which had been doing the work since 1892.

=== Growth (1903–1912) ===
The growth of the community was based on the railroad. Garwood became a separate municipality on March 19, 1903, officially becoming a borough. There was also demand for residential properties in Garwood. Residents of New York City bought $28,000 (1909 USD) of property in Garwood to build homes with access to New York City. The railroad operated a special train on August 8, 1909 that brought over 600 property owners from Communipaw Terminal in Jersey City to Garwood station to visit. They offered a second train on August 15. By 1912, the population of Garwood had reached 1,125 and was the home of six separate factories, including Aeolian, Hall, Anchor Post Iron Works, National Boiler, The Votey Organ Company and Bell Electric Motor, which combined, employed over 2,035 people. Even in 1912, land was still available next to the railroad to help facilitate construction of more factories and the Central Railroad was willing to build sidings or branch lines to connect to prospective industries.

=== Conrail and NJ Transit (1976–present) ===
On the morning of June 30, 1976, the station depot at Garwood caught fire. Police officers saw the fire at 3:05 a.m. and called for fire trucks. However, when the police department arrived at the station, the 18-by-36-foot (5.5 m × 11.0 m) wooden frame station was already a complete loss. No train service operated by Conrail was affected by the destruction of the station depot, but no plans were immediately available for what to do with the station after the fire. Garwood police stated that they believed the fire was a case of arson.

By 1981, the conditions at Garwood station had deteriorated. Numerous windows at the station had been smashed, the concrete structures were falling apart and lights at the station were improving. NJ Transit, who now operated the station, noted that the organization had $43,800 for lighting and general improvements that would occur in the summer of 1981 as part of greater improvements on the newly-named Raritan Valley Line. Construction on the improvements of the Raritan Valley Line began in March 1982 with work at Somerville station. As part of the work a new pair of low-level side platforms were to be constructed at Garwood station, along with five other stations in Union and Somerset Counties. At Garwood, stairs would be repaired and a concrete retaining wall would be installed. The electrical work at the stations would be done as part of an $87,150 contract with Calasanti Electric Service, a firm from East Hanover. The general construction work would be of the Della Pello Construction Company of Union Township.

The lack of train stops at Garwood station by NJ Transit began to come to a head in July 2005. At that time, NJ Transit offered 13 westbound trains at Garwood station, along with seven eastbound trains on weekdays, with a total of 61 passengers used the station on average. That number was small in comparison to Cranford and Westfield, which had 992 and 1,963, respectively. Tom Mezzo, a member of the Union County Transportation Advisory Board, began to ask NJ Transit to agree to add stops at Garwood. Mezzo stated that the reason ridership at Garwood station was low was because of the lack of service. Aside of the 13 weekday trains, there was no weekend or holiday service at Garwood station. The mayor of Garwood, Dennis McCarthy, supported the idea of adding trains, but had not yet asked NJ Transit to do so. James Daley, the director of the Union County Economic Development Department, also supported the addition of stops at Garwood. Mezzo noted that there was a new strip mall on North Avenue and growth in migration to Garwood in recent years. However, data only reflected a three percent growth in population and a growth of an average of three building permits per year. Two new developments opened near Garwood station within two years of Mezzo's requests, with Millennium Homes opening The Lofts at Garwood and The Pointe at Garwood in September and October 2007.

In 2010, with the creation of the go bus system by NJ Transit, they created a proposal to open a new bus rapid transit line between Garwood and downtown Elizabeth. Garwood station would serve as the western terminus, where connection would be available to Raritan Valley Line trains, along with the station at Cranford. East of Aldene, the bus rapid transit line would run eastward along the abandoned Central Railroad of New Jersey main line and parallel Route 28 to the Elizabeth station of the Northeast Corridor Line and east to Jersey Gardens. There, a branch to Newark Liberty International Airport would also be available.

Despite the improvement in development near Garwood station, NJ Transit did not improve service beyond adding two new westbound trains and two new eastbound trains. On January 12, 2015, the agency debuted nighttime runs from New York Penn Station to High Bridge in Hunterdon County, offering a one-seat ride rather than having to transfer at Newark. The new one-seat trains made all stops in Union County except for Garwood, resulting in anger from Mayor Charles Lombardo. Lombardo wrote a letter to the agency asking NJ Transit to consider getting stops in Garwood, but added that the community would need to acquire more development to get the agency to up the station stops.

On November 8, 2020, NJ Transit changed the schedules and added weekend service to five stations that formerly had less or no service. This included Garwood station, in which all weekend trains would now stop at Garwood with the exception of the last eastbound and westbound trains to and from Raritan station.

== Station layout ==
The station has two low-level side platforms serving two tracks. The inbound platform is 200 feet (61 m) long and can accommodate two cars, while the outbound platform is 121 feet (37 m) long and accommodates one car.

== Bibliography ==
- New Jersey State Legislature (1912). Documents of the One Hundred and Thirty-Sixth Legislature of the State of New Jersey and the Sixty-Eighth Under the New Constitution Vol. VI. Documents 42 to 59 Inclusive. Trenton, New Jersey: State Gazette Publishing Company.
