= Connection line =

The term connection line refers to a rail line whose principal purpose is to connect other lines. Specifically it may refer, amongst others, to:

- The Chrystie Street Connection, a New York Subway line on the Lower East Side of Manhattan, New York
- The Lehigh Line Connection, a rail line that connects Amtrak's Northeast Corridor with the Conrail Lehigh Line near Newark, New Jersey
- The Montclair Connection, a rail line on the NJ Transit Rail Operations system in New Jersey
- The North–South connection, a rail line through the centre of Brussels, Belgium, is not a connection line properly speaking, but a main railway line in its own right
- The Stockholm Connection Line, a rail line that connects the north and south of Stockholm, Sweden
- The Wairarapa Connection, an interurban commuter rail line in New Zealand
- The 60th Street Tunnel Connection, a line of the New York Subway connecting the 60th Street Tunnel with the IND Queens Boulevard Line in Queens, New York
