= Newark–Elizabeth Rail Link =

Proposed light rail line in New Jersey

Newark-Elizabeth Rail Link

Technical
- Line length: 8.8 mi (14.2 km)
- Track gauge: 1,435 mm (4 ft 8 1/2 in)
Route map
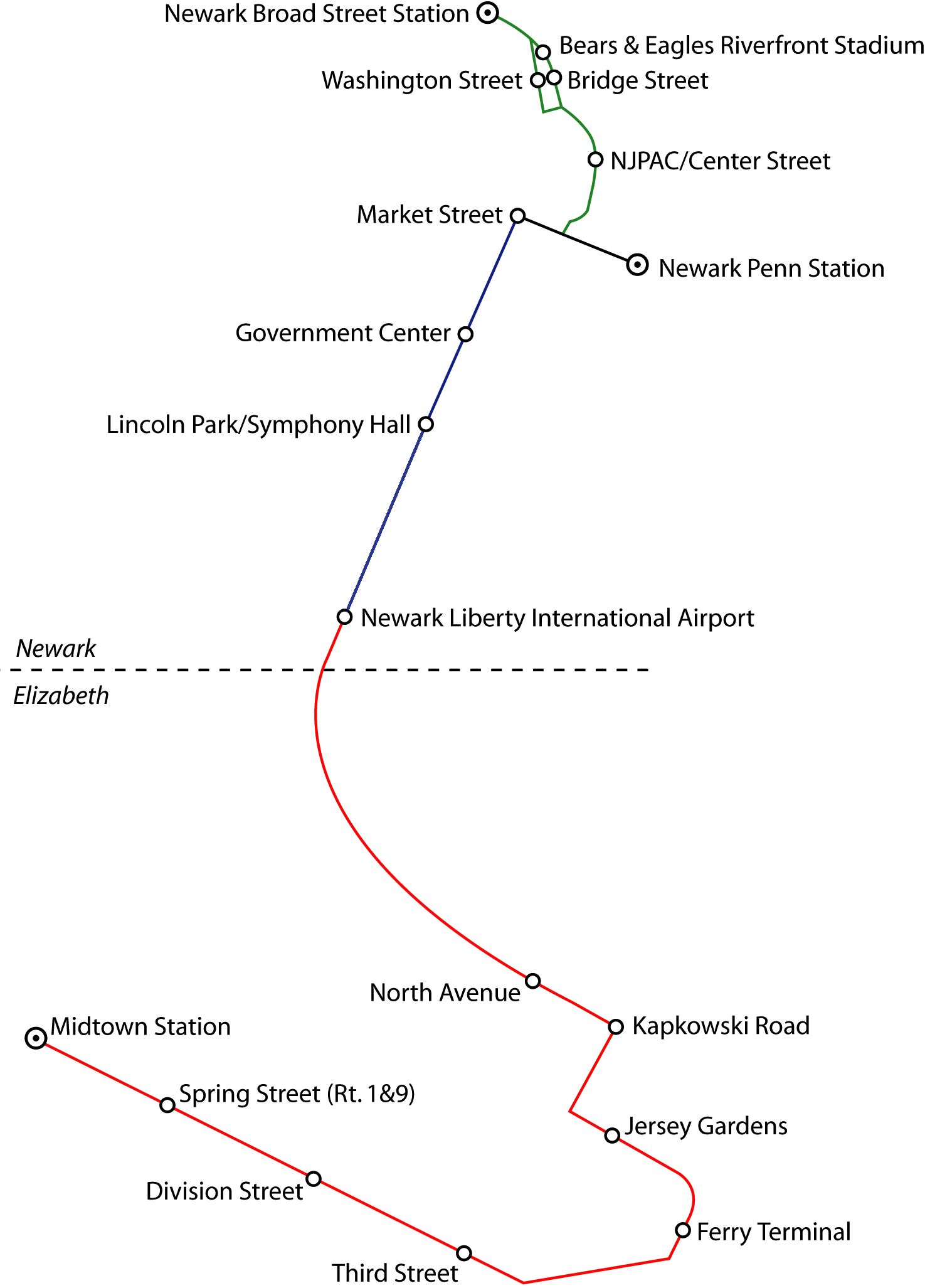
Concept map of Newark-Elizabeth Rail Link, based on preliminary NJ Transit reports. The green line is the completed MOS-1, the blue line is MOS-2, and the red line is Union County Light Rail.

The Newark–Elizabeth Rail Link (NERL) was a proposed 8.8-mile (14.2 km)-long light rail line in New Jersey. If built, it would be operated by New Jersey Transit and would connect the downtown areas of Newark and Elizabeth with Newark Liberty International Airport. The construction of the project was being planned in stages, or "minimum operable segments" (MOS).

The first minimum operable segment (MOS-1) opened to the public on July 17, 2006, as the Newark Light Rail's Broad Street Extension, connecting Broad Street Station and Penn Station in Newark.

The second segment (MOS-2) would have connected Penn Station with the airport, while the third segment became known as the Union County Light Rail.

The Union County Light Rail would have had eight or nine stations in Elizabeth, one at Newark Airport and possible future stations in other towns. The line connecting Midtown (Broad Street) Station and Newark Airport would have been 5.8 miles (9.3 km) long, and been built on former Conrail lines (originally the main line of the Central Railroad of New Jersey), now under ownership of the New Jersey Department of Transportation (NJDOT) traversing Elizabeth from east to west. Further extension along the right-of-way westward to Cranford or points further west on the Raritan Valley Line was also forwarded by citizen groups.

In 2006, NJ Transit removed Union County Light Rail from its list of candidate projects in its Capital Improvement Program, effectively ending the project.

New Jersey Transit cited the project in its 2016 Capital Improvement Program without any specific allocation.

== Station listing ==
=== MOS-2 ===
- Newark Penn Station
- Market Street (at Mulberry Street)
- Government Center (Mulberry Street)
- Lincoln Park/Symphony Hall (Camp Street)
- Newark Liberty International Airport (connecting with the airport via AirTrain Newark)

=== Union County Light Rail ===
- AirTrain Newark at parking lot P2
- North Avenue
- Kapkowski Road
- Jersey Gardens
- Ferry Terminal (ferry to New York City)
- Singer Station (possible station)
- Third Street/Elizabethport
- Division Street
- Spring Street (U.S. Route 1/9)
- Midtown Station - connections with the Northeast Corridor Line

=== Proposed extension stations ===
- Elmora
- Lorraine
- Roselle
- Cranford Station

The first three were former CNJ station locations.

== Liberty Corridor Bus Rapid Transit Service ==
The planned Liberty Corridor Bus Rapid Transit Service which include the Greater Newark go bus and the Union go bus expressway, will provide service along much of the route of the NERL.

The Union go bus expressway is a proposed bus rapid transit system between Garwood and the airport via Midtown Elizabeth which includes routing elements of the light rail plan.
