= Fanwood station =

NJ Transit rail station

Fanwood
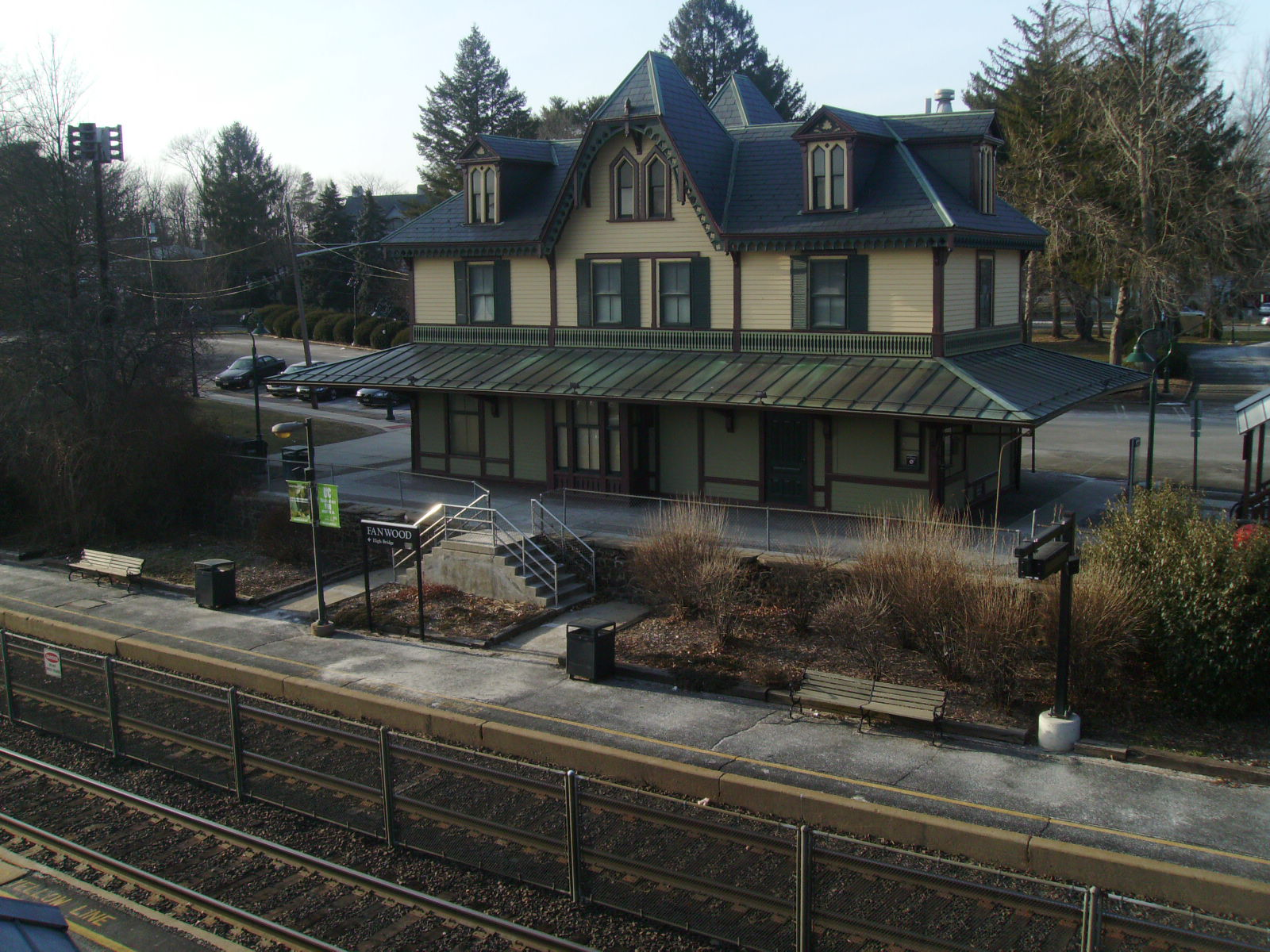
- The Fanwood station as viewed from the pedestrian overpass on a winter afternoon.

General information
- Location: South Avenue (NJ 28) and South Martine Avenue, Fanwood, New Jersey
- Owner: New Jersey Transit
- Line: Raritan Valley Line
- Distance: 20.6 miles (33.2 km) from Jersey City
- Platforms: 2 side platforms
- Tracks: 2
- Connections: NJ Transit Bus: 113

Construction
- Parking: Yes, paid and permit parking
- Cycle facilities: Yes
- Accessible: No

Other information
- Fare zone: 9

History
- Opened: January 1, 1839
- Rebuilt: 1868
- Former names: Scotch Plains; Fanwood Park

Passengers
- 2025: 615 (average weekday)
- Rank: 47 of 153

Services
Preceding station	NJ Transit	Following station
Netherwood toward High Bridge	Raritan Valley Line	Westfield toward Newark Penn or New York
Former services
Preceding station	Central Railroad of New Jersey	Following station
Netherwood toward Somerville	Somerville – Jersey City Local	Westfield toward Jersey City
- Central Railroad of New Jersey
- U.S. National Register of Historic Places
- U.S. Historic district – Contributing property
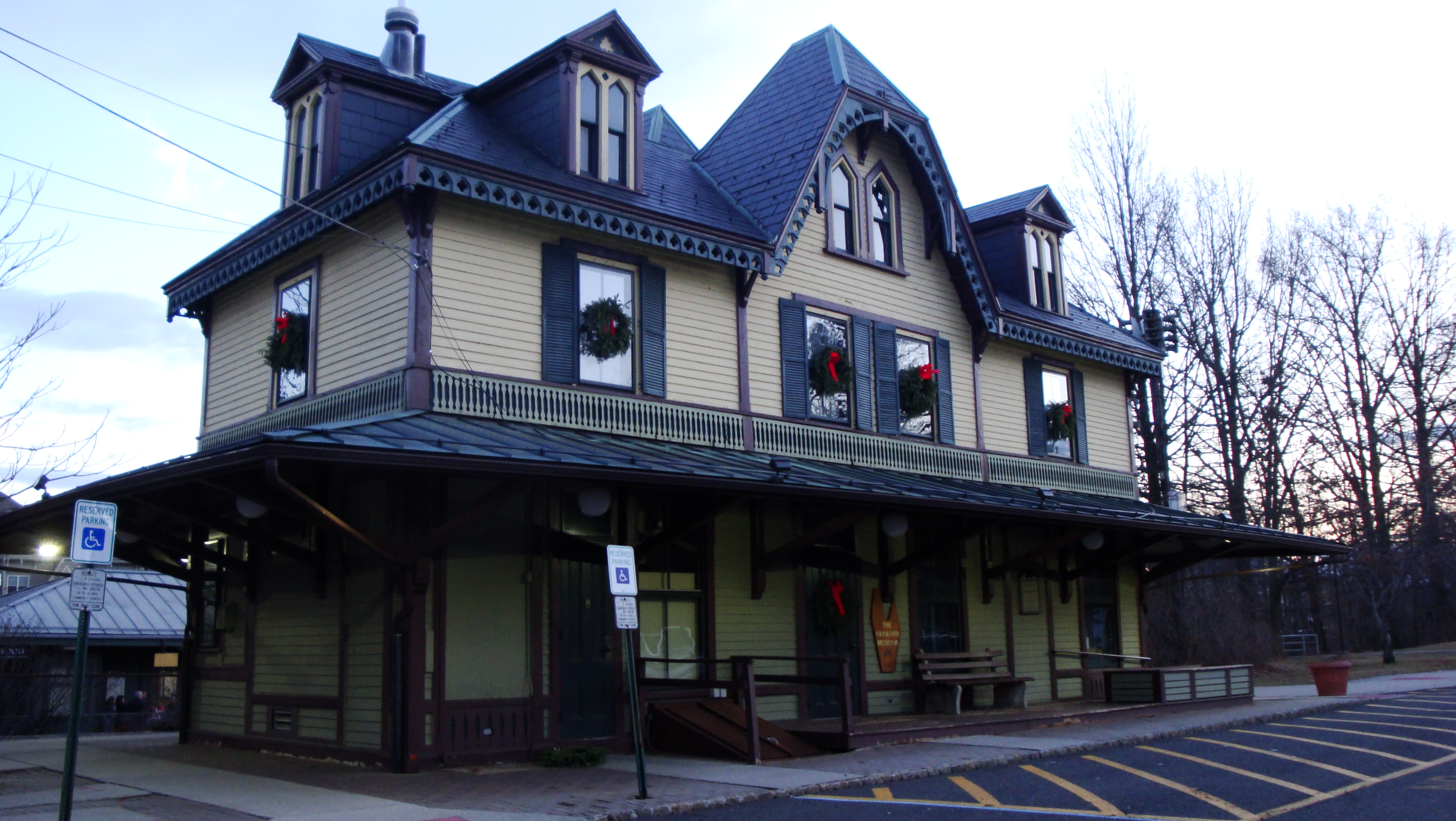
- Fanwood's former CNJ depot in January 2020.
- Interactive map of Central Railroad of New Jersey
- Location: 238 North Avenue, Fanwood, New Jersey
- Coordinates: 40°38′28″N 74°23′6″W
- Built: 1874
- Architect: Central Railroad of New Jersey
- Architectural style: Late-Victorian
- Part of: Fanwood Park Historic District (ID04000516)
- NRHP reference No.: 80002521

Significant dates
- Added to NRHP: July 17, 1980
- Designated CP: May 27, 2004
Location

Fanwood is a New Jersey Transit railroad station on the Raritan Valley Line, in Fanwood, Union County, New Jersey, United States. The building on the north side of the tracks (westbound platform) is a Victorian building and, like the north building at Westfield, is used by a non-profit organization. The address is Fanwood Station, 238 North Avenue, Fanwood, Union County, New Jersey. The ticket office is in the station building on the south side of the tracks (eastbound platform). The station was added to the National Register of Historic Places on July 17, 1980.

== History ==
The original station was built a quarter mile to the north and called Scotch Plains station. That station was put in service in 1837 by the Elizabethtown and Somerville Railroad which had completed the line from Elizabethport to Plainfield by that time. Modern-day Midway Avenue occupies the route of the old line. The original line had to skirt the hill at Fanwood because wood-burning locomotives of the time could not climb the steep grade. With the advent of more powerful coal-burning locomotives that were able to climb the Fanwood hill, the Central Railroad of New Jersey (which had taken over the line) began to acquire land in 1867 to relocate the line to its current location. The company's charter from the state required the railroad to acquire all the land between the old line and the new line. The land acquired was fan-shaped. The station name was changed from Scotch Plains to Fanwood. Besides a new station, the land was developed by the railroad into suburban housing lots laid out on a network of curved streets and called Fanwood Park. The Central New Jersey Land Improvement Company, a subsidiary of the railroad, built and sold houses in Fanwood Park for the next forty years.

The Fanwood Station Complex consists of the main station building (1874), the shelter (1897) and the overpass (1946). The station main building was built in 1874 in the popular Victorian Carpenter Gothic style. The station was part of a new line from Westfield to Plainfield and named Fanwood after Miss Fanny Wood, the daughter of a railroad official. Similar portmanteau names are present in the town of Elberon, named after local property magnate L. B. Brown. The lands surrounding the station became known as Fanwood Park, and the Borough of Fanwood was created in 1895. Several stations were erected in this style. These include Matawan on the North Jersey Coast line (though it lost its gingerbread trim) and Red Bank (restored), and the now demolished/replaced/completely remodeled stations Branchport, Bound Brook, Perth Amboy, Sewaren and Asbury Park.

The shelter was built 1897 for the Central Railroad of New Jersey (New Jersey Central) to the designs of an unknown architect in a similar style to the main building. It was designed as a baggage facility and passenger waiting area for the Southside (non-main building) of the tracks. and converted into a temporary commuter sheeted in 1965 when the station was sold to the Borough of Fanwood and converted for community use. The overpass, which bridged two sides of the tracks, was erected in 1946.

The station was added to the National Register of Historic Places on July 17, 1980. It was added as a contributing property to the Fanwood Park Historic District on May 27, 2004.

== Station layout ==
The station has two low-level side platforms serving two tracks. The inbound platform is 383 feet (117 m) long while the outbound platform is 381 feet (116 m) long; both can accommodate four cars.

== See also ==
- Operating Passenger Railroad Stations Thematic Resource
- List of New Jersey Transit stations
- National Register of Historic Places listings in Union County, New Jersey
