= Bus rapid transit in New Jersey =

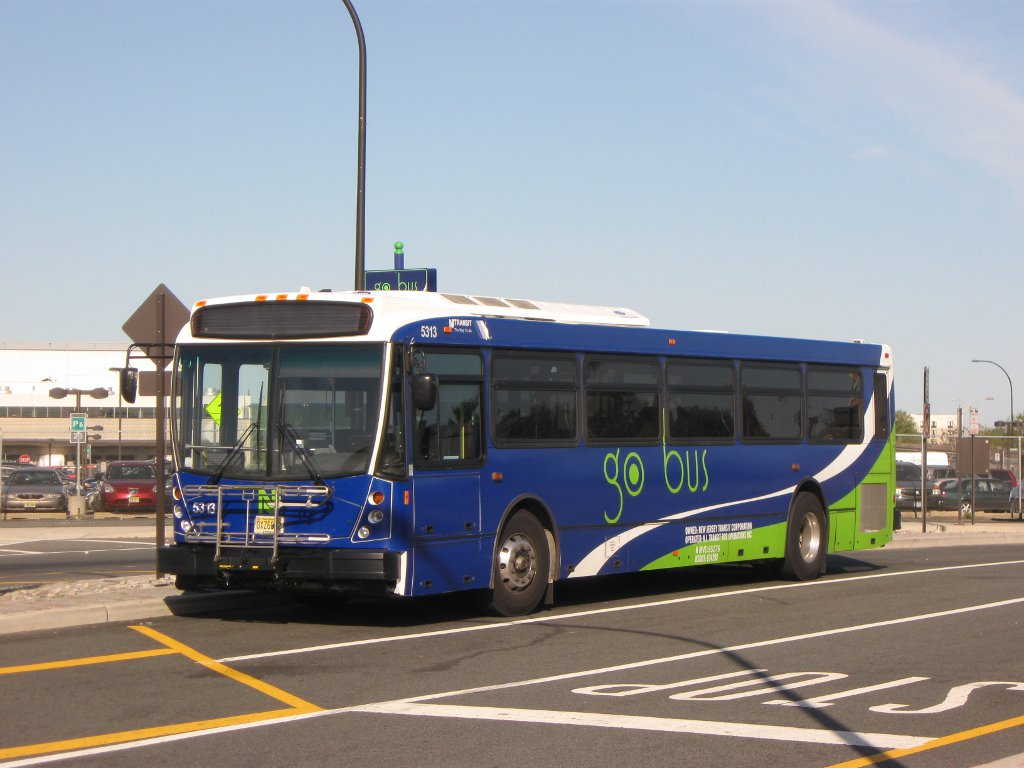
Buses in the Newark BRT system are wrapped with go bus

Bus rapid transit (BRT) in New Jersey comprises limited-stop bus service, exclusive bus lanes (XBL) and bus bypass shoulders (BBS). Under the banner Next Generation Bus NJ Transit (NJT), the New Jersey Department of Transportation (NJDOT), and the metropolitan planning organizations of New Jersey (MPO) which recommend and authorize transportation projects are undertaking the creation of several additional BRT systems in the state.

In 2011, NJT announced that it would equip its entire bus fleet with devices for real-time locating, thus creating the basis for "next bus" scheduling information at bus shelters. The introduction and expanded use of bus rapid transit in the Garden State is part of the worldwide phenomenon to bring mass transit to heavily trafficked corridors in both high and medium density areas as a cost-saving, and sometimes more flexible, alternative to rail transportation, thus reducing automobile dependency and traffic congestion.

== Existing systems ==
=== Greater Newark go bus ===
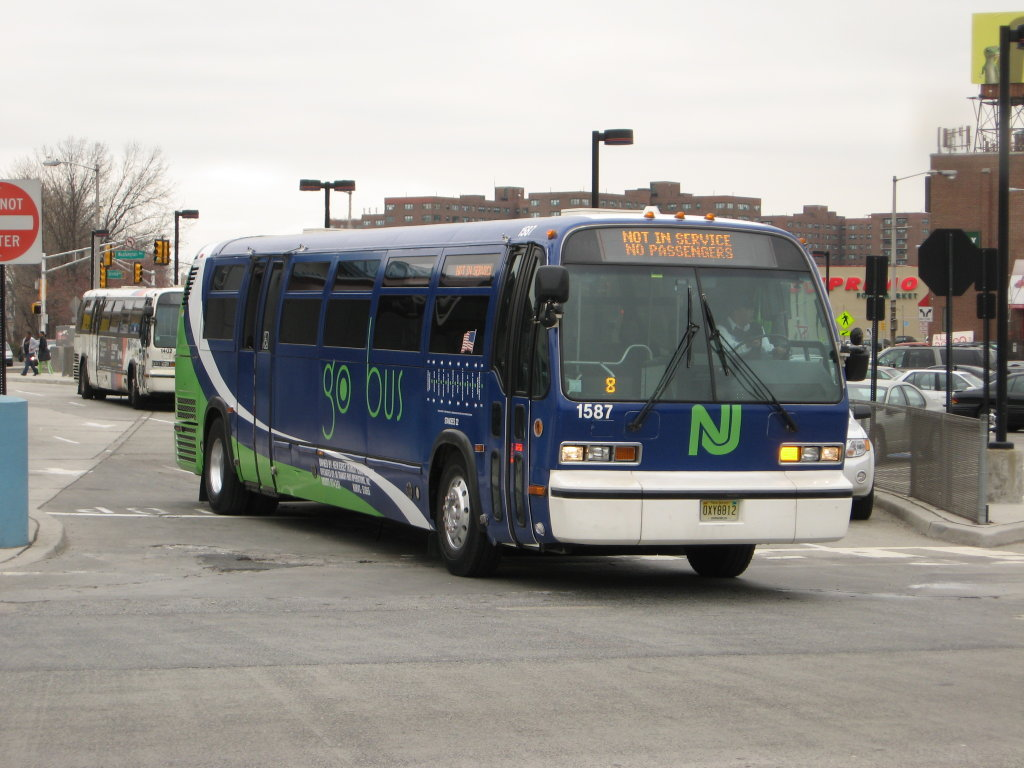
go bus

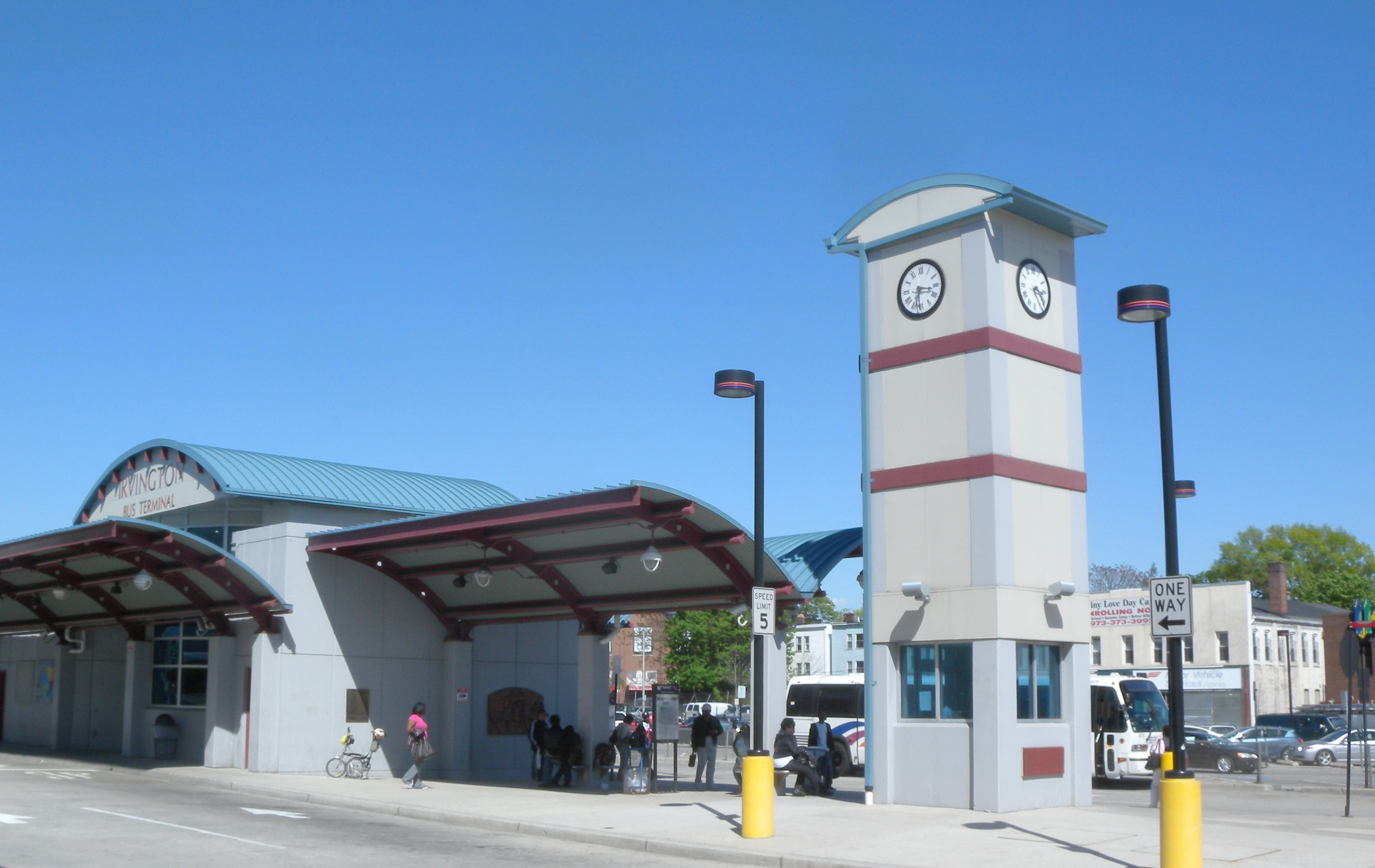
go bus 25 runs between Irvington Bus Terminal, NJT's second busiest, and Penn Station Newark

NJ Transit began service on its first BRT line, go bus 25, in September 2008. During peak periods, the line makes limited stops at eleven points between Newark Penn Station and the Irvington Bus Terminal, running for most of its length along Springfield Avenue, a minor thoroughfare. Emission free battery electric buses will be introduced to the line in 2026.

The go bus 28 is a full-time service between Newark Liberty International Airport's North Area Transit Center, its three terminals, the city's central business district, Branch Brook Park, the Roseville neighborhood, and Bloomfield. Connections to the Montclair-Boonton Line and Newark Light Rail (NLR) are possible on the line's northern segment. There are proposals to extend the service westward to Montclair State University.

Route	Terminals			Via
go bus 25	Newark Penn Station	↔	Irvington Bus Terminal	Four Corners, Essex County Courthouse, Springfield Avenue
go bus 28	Newark Airport	↔	Newark Broad Street Station	McCarter Highway, Lincoln Park,Government Center, Four Corners, Military Park
go bus 28	Newark Airport	↔	Bloomfield Station	Branch Brook Park, Bloomfield Ave (NLR), Roseville, Grove St (NLR)

=== Route 9 BBS ===
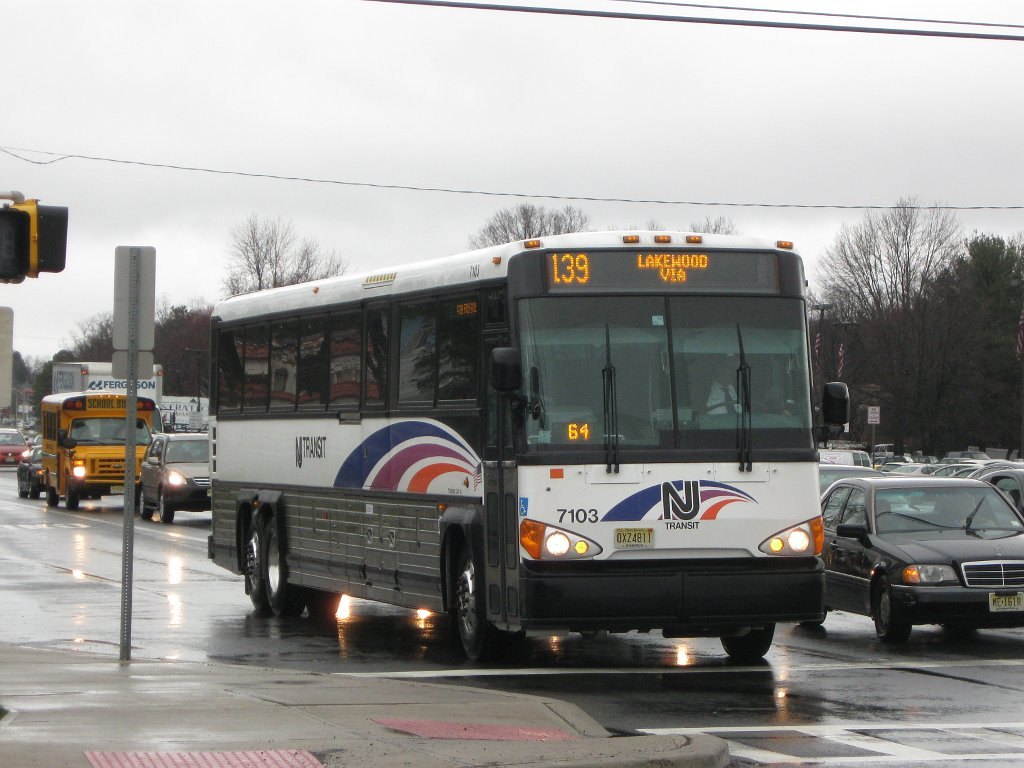
NJT 139 in Old Bridge

Route 9 is among the busiest bus corridors in the state. Compressed natural gas buses were introduced in 2015.

Shoulder lanes, or bus bypass shoulders (BBS), along Route 9 in are a part of the express bus system in Monmouth and Middlesex counties. The highway is used by NJT's routes 63, 64, 67 to Hudson County, the 130, 132, 136, 139 to PABT, and Academy Bus to Lower Manhattan.

In 2006, NJDOT reconstructed two stretches of shoulders and made improvements in signals and sidewalks for exclusive bus use during peak hours. The bus lanes, which run for approximately 3 miles (4.83 km) from just south of Sayreville in Old Bridge, are the first component of a planned 20-mile (32.19 km) BBS corridor in Monmouth and northern Ocean counties.

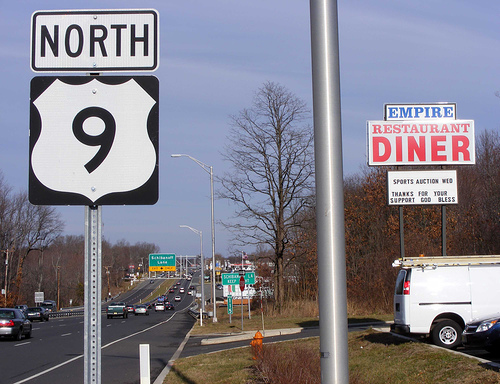
U.S. Route 9 in Freehold through which the third section of BBS will pass

The southern terminus of the extended BBS corridor would be in Lakewood, which along with adjacent Toms River saw major population growth between 2000 and 2010 and are now among the largest municipalities in the state by population. As of 2011, a $588 million project for expansion of the 7.2-mile (11.59 km) segment of Route 9 in the towns was in a "design concept" phase with funding earmarked for 2016-2017 construction. Concurrently, studies are being conducted to explore the possibility of providing rail service to the region. Known as the MOM (Monmouth-Ocean-Middlesex) project various alignments are being considered as to where the line would join either the Northeast Corridor Line or the North Jersey Coast Line.

An extensive analysis by consulting and planning firm Stantec released in 2010 includes recommendations regarding design, construction, and implementation of the BBS extension. The 2nd phase of the project would start at the project's southern end near the Lakewood Bus Terminal near Route 88. The third phase and final phase would connect the northern and southern segments passing through Freehold Township and proximate towns, where work would include some widening and deepening of the roadbed to handle bus traffic.

In 2022, NJ Transit received a federal grant to study how transit-oriented development could influence & encourage a more comprehensive BRT system along a 21-mile segment of Route 9 from Old Bridge Park and Ride to Aldrich Park and Ride in Howell Township. As of 2025, there were 80 bus stops along that segment of Route 9. Old Bridge Township is considering seeking a TOD transit village designation for part of the road.

=== Secaucus to Meadowlands Transitway ===
In 2021 NJ Transit authorized studies for alternative BRT options between Secaucus Junction and the Meadowlands Sports Complex to supplement the Meadowlands Rail Line, including a bus transitway. It is planned to go into service for the 2026 FIFA World Cup. The transitway was initially planned to utilize the eastern and western spurs of the New Jersey Turnpike with bus-only connector ramps near New Jersey Route 7. Future plans include a busway partially along the former Boonton Line right of way, which is also slated to become a new state park, the Essex–Hudson Greenway.

On October 10, 2024, NJ Transit approved construction of the Transitway. The majority of the road and intersection infrastructure for the initial phase is already in place. Plans to build a bus terminal adjacent to MetLife Stadium at Route 120 were scrapped in later development phases. The route follows County Road, Seaview Drive, Meadowlands Parkway, and the Hackensack River crossings on NJ Route 3. Work on the route commenced in September 2025. Hard-Shoulder Running (HSR) lanes along Route 120 will be implemented. Lidar traffic enforcement will be used to monitor traffic along the route. The Meadowlands Adaptive Signal System for Traffic Reduction, also known as MASSTR, covers the entire Meadowlands.

In 2025, NJ Transit announced the allocation $22 million to complete design and engineering work for Phase 2 from Secaucus to Jersey City via the Bergen Arches.

== Studies and proposals ==
=== Princeton Transitway ===
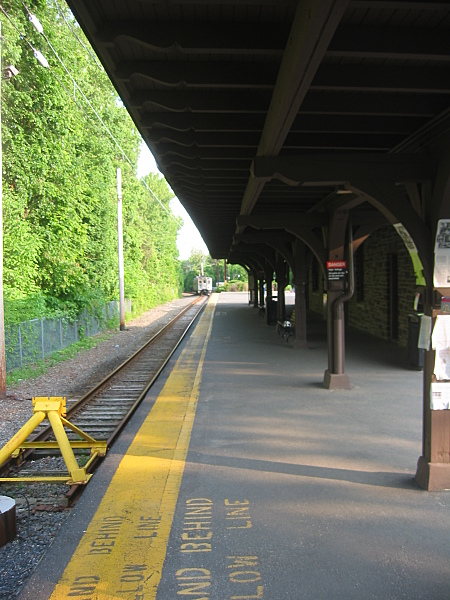
The transitway would parallel the ROW at the former Princeton Station

The Princeton Transitway would parallel the right-of-way (ROW) of the Princeton Branch, which runs for just under 3 miles (4.83 km) and is served by a shuttle called the Dinky between Princeton Junction station and Princeton Station, located on the Princeton University campus. A greenway providing pedestrian and bicycle paths, as well as exclusive bus lane would be incorporated into the plan.

=== Greater New Brunswick BRT ===
In 2008, NJ Transit and the North Jersey Transportation Planning Authority (NJTPA) initially studied the possibility of BRT in the Greater New Brunswick area. Identified, and the subject of further study, is a potential corridor along Livingston Avenue and Route 27 between Metuchen station and North Brunswick passing through Downtown New Brunswick at the New Brunswick station. Local bus service (NJ Transit bus routes 800–880 serve the region) would be transformed through the phased implementation of BRT components.

=== South Jersey BRT ===
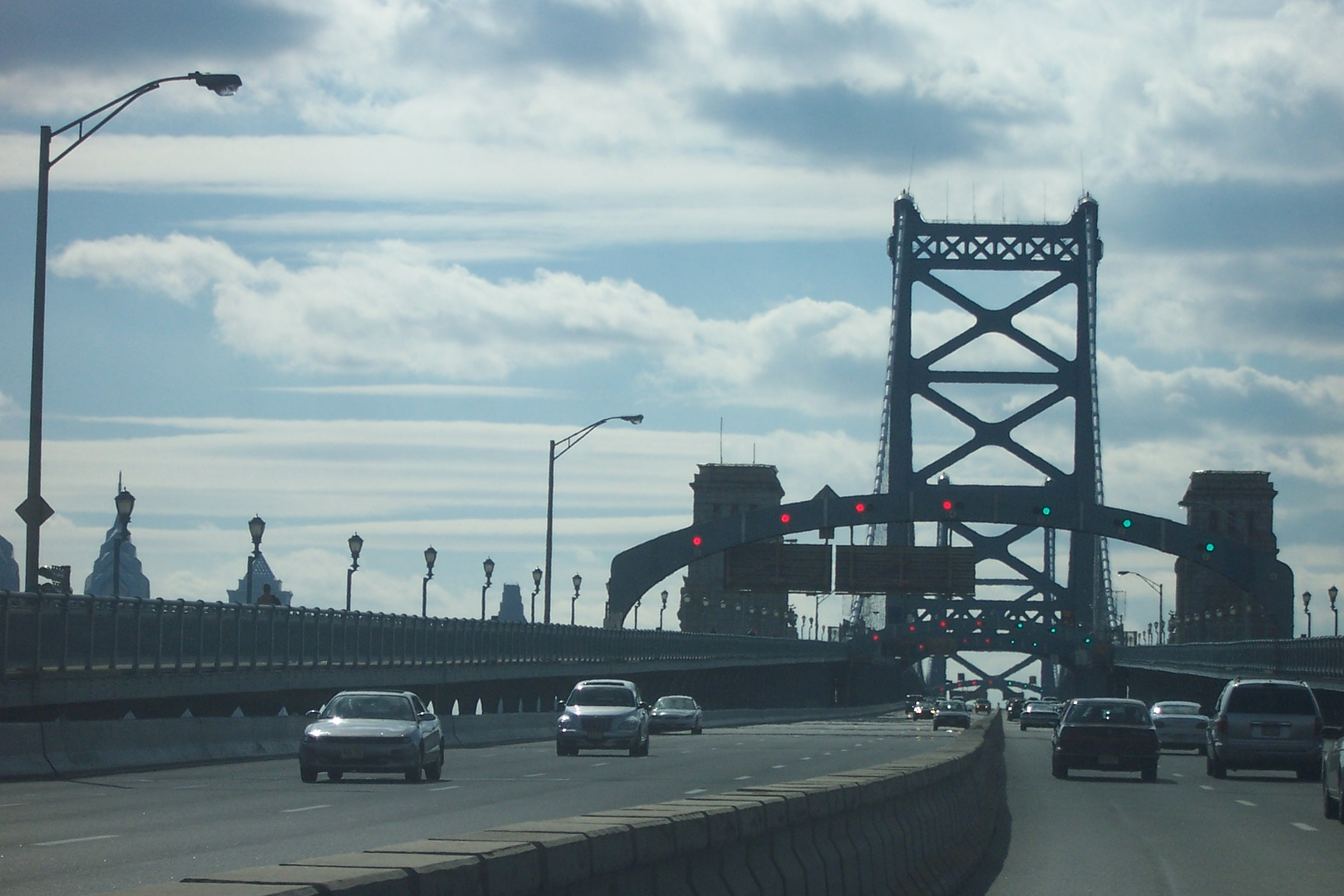
The Benjamin Franklin Bridge is equipped with "zipper" barrier and the overhead gantry lights allowing for reversible lanes.

A BRT system in the Philadelphia metropolitan area is part of a broader plan to expand a regional multimodal transportation network in adjacent Camden and Gloucester counties to Downtown Camden and across the Delaware River to the city of Philadelphia. Other elements of network would include additions and adjustments to the PATCO Speedline and Atlantic City Line and construction of the Glassboro–Camden Line, an 18-mile (28.97 km) extension or connection to the light rail River LINE. The region is served by NJT buses 400–499.

The BRT component would be developed along the heavily traveled corridor comprising I-676, Route 42, and Route 55 The southern end of the system would be a newly constructed park and ride in Deptford on Route 55 and an expanded one in Winslow with peak hour buses running at 10–15 minute intervals. Traveling northwest the two lines would converge to pass through downtown Camden, where transfers would be possible for other components of the network, including at the Walter Rand Transportation Center. They would then continue over the Benjamin Franklin Bridge, equipped with reversible or contra-flow lanes to a point near Philadelphia City Hall. In July 2012, NJT received $2.6 million in federal funding to advance the project.

=== Bayonne–Journal Square BRT ===
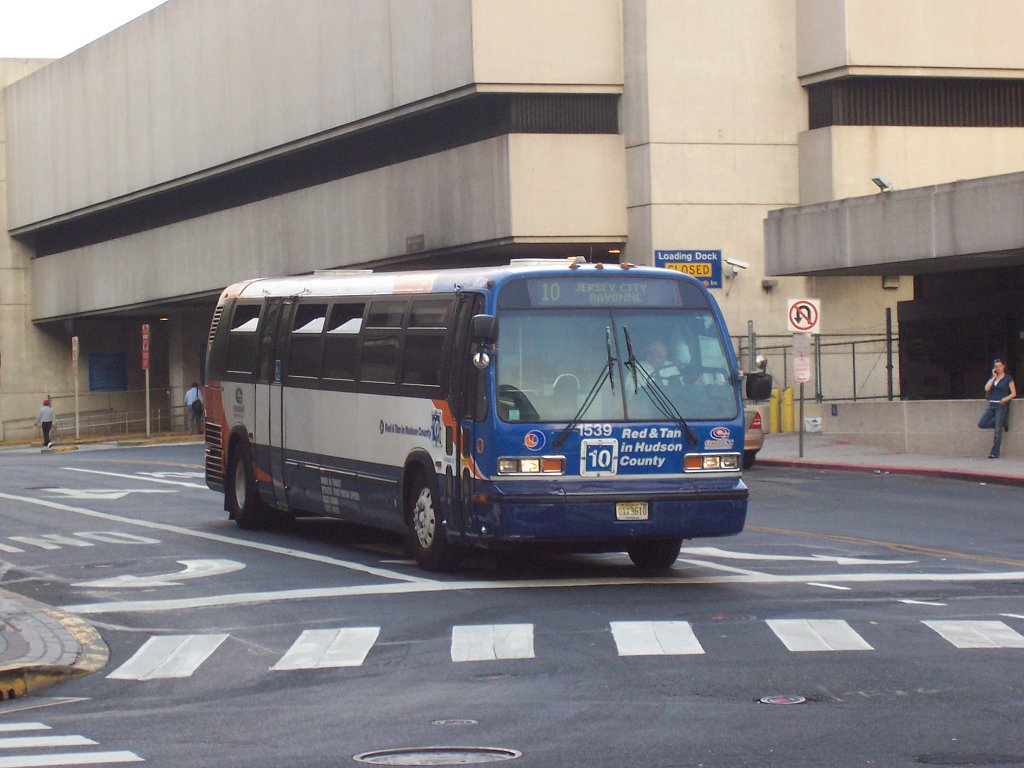
Changing public transportation use patterns, due in part to increased travel by light rail and jitney, led to several studies to evaluate bus circulation in Hudson County, such as on the number 10 bus, seen here leaving the Journal Square Transportation Center

The opening of the Hudson Bergen Light Rail (HBLR) in 2000 and the increased use of jitneys, locally known as dollar vans, have greatly affected travel patterns in Hudson County, leading to decreased bus ridership on traditional transit corridors. After studies conducted examine existing systems and to address the changes in public transportation it was determined that BRT systems would be appropriate for certain parts of the densely populated urban core of northeastern New Jersey.

The Bayonne / Greenville / Journal Square Bus Rapid Transit Study, funded by NJTPA and the Hudson County Board of Chosen Freeholders and conducted by Parsons Brinckerhoff, does not propose a dedicated bus ROW for the BRT, but similar to Newark's go bus or New York's Select Bus Service, using city streets. It will examine the optimal location of boarding kiosks with scheduling amenities, appropriate vehicles, and branding and explore possible corridors on Broadway, Avenue C, Garfield Avenue, and Ocean Avenue and connections to the Staten Island-bound S89 bus at the HBLR 34th Street Station. As of March 2013, preliminary studies identified Kennedy Boulevard, which runs the length of the county, as the best potential corridor perhaps in hybrid route with Bergen Avenue and MLK Drive.

In anticipation of a general increase of activity at Port Jersey and new development on West Side and Bayfront in Jersey City studies are being conducted to transform routes 440 and 1/9 into a multi-use urban boulevard that includes possible grade separations, meridians, and traffic circle, thus creating a viable BRT corridor. As envisioned, the BRT corridor would run from Droyer's Point and reach Journal Square via Sip Avenue.

=== Union go bus expressway ===
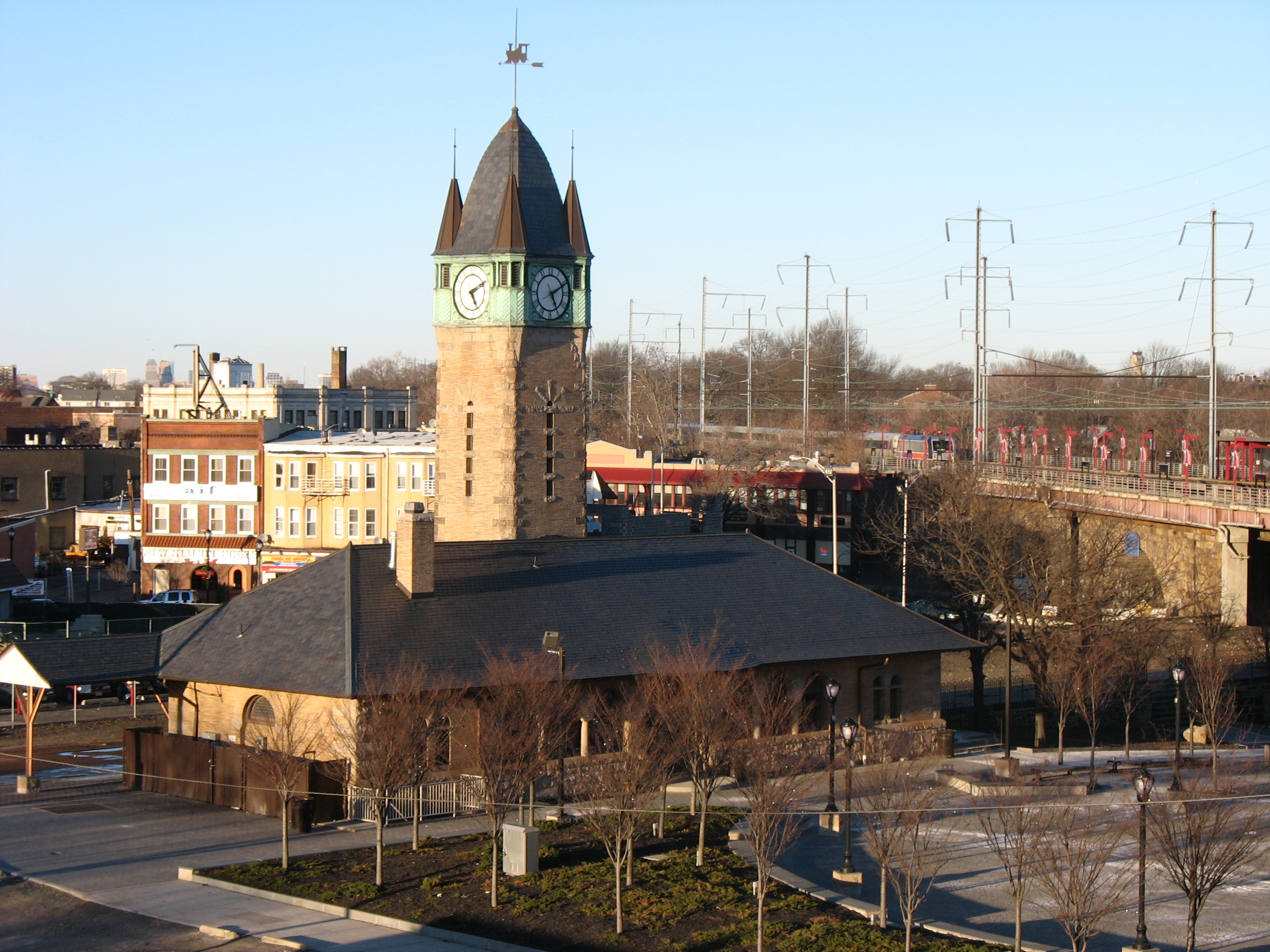
The former Central Railroad of New Jersey station house in Elizabeth. The current NJ Transit station on the Northeast Corridor is visible elevated on the right. They have been the focal point of a multi-modal integration and transit-oriented development study.

The proposed Union County go bus system is part of the planned Liberty Corridor Bus Rapid Transit Service network centered around Newark Liberty International Airport. The hub of the Union network would be the unused former Central Railroad of New Jersey (CNJ) station in Elizabeth which is adjacent to NJT's Elizabeth station that is served by the Northeast Corridor Line and the North Jersey Coast Line. Proposals call for reconstruction and better integration of the two stations as Midtown Station. The district has been identified as one of the state's major potential transit-oriented development (TOD) centers.

The northern end of the system would travel through Midtown and the parking areas, terminals, and cargo shipping facilities at Newark Airport, partially following the Union County Light Rail route plan that was scrapped in 2006). A spur on this portion would travel to Jersey Gardens, a regional shopping mall.

In a southwesterly direction the system would utilize an abandoned portion of the Central Railroad of New Jersey mainline right-of-way between Midtown Station and the Aldene Connection, where the current Raritan Valley Line ). A parallel greenway providing pedestrian and bicycle paths, would be incorporated into the plan. Once joining the RVL the busway would allow for transfers at Cranford Station and Garwood Station, where it would end. The go bus expressway would generally parallel New Jersey Route 28.

=== Bergen BRT ===
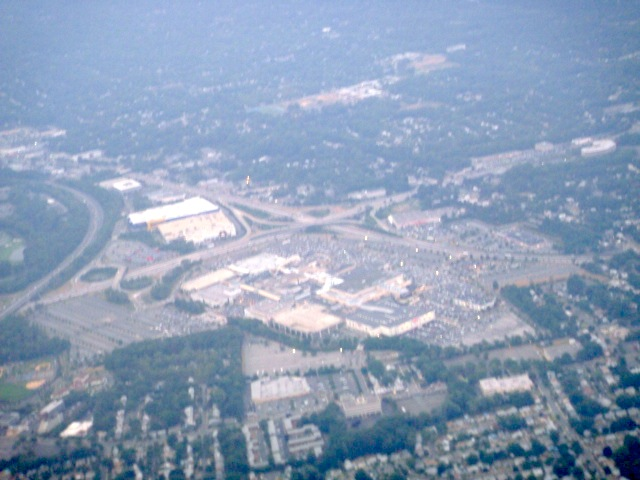
Intersection of Route 17 and Route 4: The malls of Paramus are major activity generators. 2013 study recommends nine BRT routes, many which pass through area.

While served in part by rail, adjacent Bergen and Passaic counties nonetheless rely heavily on bus service for public transportation. Efforts to expand rail service with the Northern Branch Corridor Project have been proposed and stalled. The Passaic–Bergen–Hudson Transit Project is study to improve cross-county (east-west) connectivity using light rail DMUs or buses.

Various studies have been conducted and proposals have been made to create a comprehensive bus network, including the development of BRT routes concentrated in the vicinity of NJ Route 17, a frequently congested commercial and commuter corridor between the Meadowlands Sports Complex and the New York State line, running on a southeast–northwest diagonal between NJT's Main/Bergen and Pascack Valley rail lines. Of particular focus is the Hackensack–Paramus area, where there is a concentration of "activity generators"—shopping malls, colleges, hospitals, and government offices—both north and south of Route 4, an important east–west corridor. The intersection of Routes 4 and 17 is one of the busiest in the world. Largely "built-out", Bergen and Passaic are seeing a trend toward transit oriented development conducive to BRT.

In the 2006 report Route 17 Bergen Rapid Transit Study, STV Group proposed two BRT lines would have originated/terminated at Secaucus Junction, a major NJT rail interchange station between New York Penn Station and Newark Penn Station. At the time Access to the Region's Core (ARC), an extensive rail infrastructure project which included new Hudson River tunnel was in its planning stages with the presumption it would be built. ARC was canceled in 2010. The Blue Route would have travelled from the northern part of the county and then run express from Hackensack along Interstate 80 and the New Jersey Turnpike. The Orange Route would have travelled from Paramus through the southern part of the county.

In 2010, Parsons Brinkerhoff's Vision Bergen: Blueprint For Our Future Networking Transportation To Make It Work Route 17 identified a number of trunk and branch BRT routes for the county, and recommended the Blue Route as the best alternative for a pilot project. It is estimated that implementing the route would cost $45 million.

In October 2011, NJT said that there is no funding available for implementation of a BRT system, but that a study would establish an "action plan" should any become available. In November 2011 the Bergen County Board of Chosen Freeholders and NJT agreed jointly fund $600,000 for the Bus Rapid Transit Implementation Study, the purpose of which is to identify two or more BRT routes and enhancements between bus and rail service. The study addresses changing travel patterns, particularly the fact that nearly 60% of commuter trips are made within the county.

In June 2014, it was announced that five "preferred" routes had been established. Two would originate/terminate at the Port Authority Bus Terminal, with one traveling along the Hudson waterfront and local streets to the Garden State Plaza shopping mall in Paramus and the other along Route 17 to the existing Montvale Park & Ride on the Garden State Parkway. Two would originate/terminate at Secaucus Junction, one running to Bergen Community College via Route 17 and one to Englewood Hospital via local streets and the New Jersey Turnpike. The fifth route would travel between the Broadway Bus Terminal in Paterson and George Washington Bridge Bus Station along Route 4. In November 2014, it was announced that three potential routes would be studied:

Route	Route	Route
Secaucus Junction: Harmon Meadow; Meadowlands Sports Complex; Summit Avenue in Hackensack; Hackensack University Medical Center; Garden State Plaza; Bergen Community College; Paramus Park Mall; Montvale Park and Ride	Secaucus Junction: Meadowlands Sports Complex; Bergen Community College- Lyndhurst; Hackensack Bus Terminal; Bergen County Court House; Essex Street Station; Hackensack University Medical Center; Bergen Town Center; Paramus Park	Broadway Bus Terminal (Paterson): St. Joseph's Regional Medical Center; Garden State Plaza, Downtown Hackensack; Overpeck County Park; Englewood Hospital

In September 2017, a new study was released which identified four (A, B, C, D) preferred BRT routes.
