= Netherwood station =

NJ Transit rail station

Netherwood
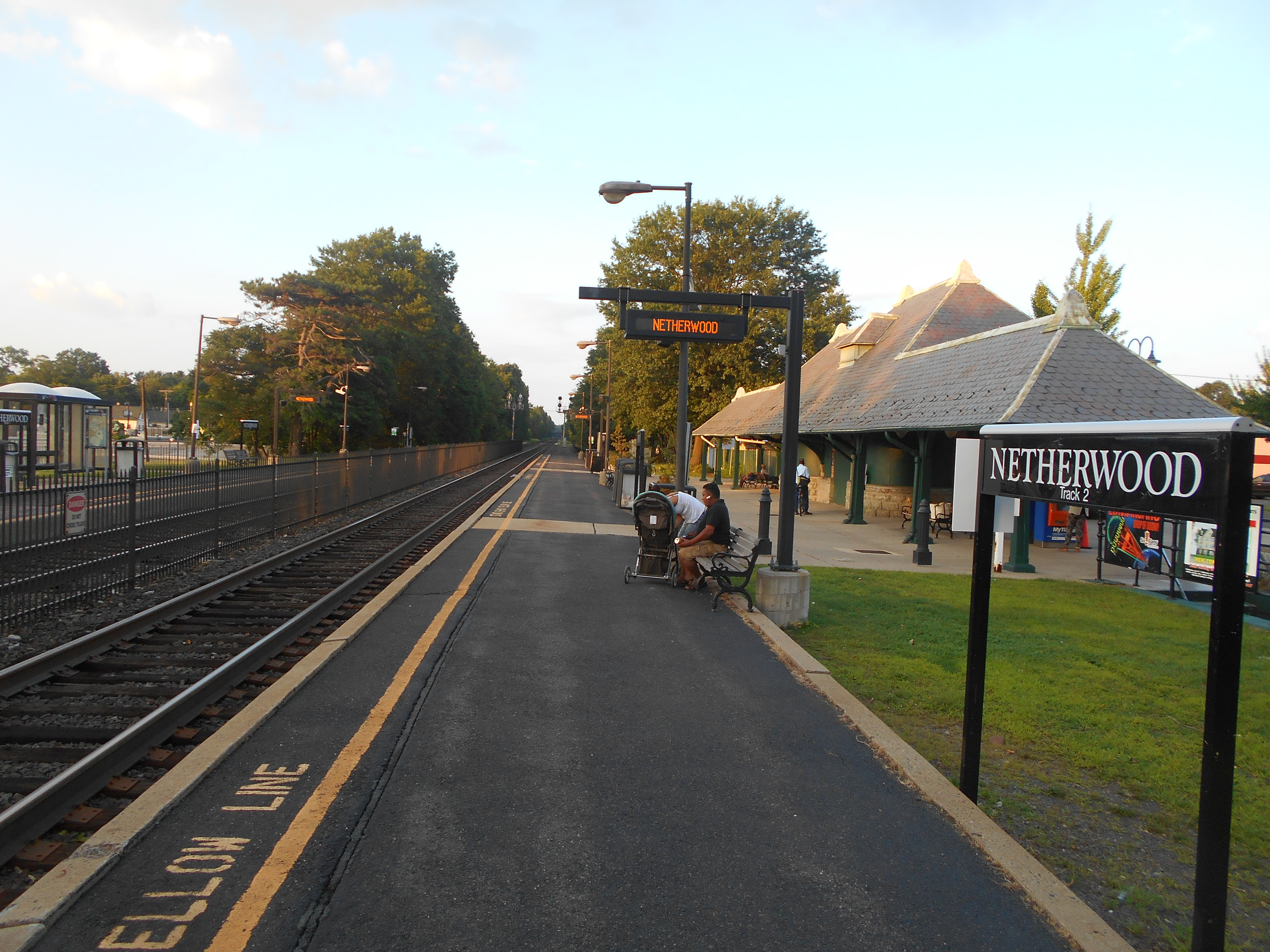
- Netherwood station in August 2014.

General information
- Location: South Avenue (NJ 28) and Belvedere Avenue, Plainfield, New Jersey
- Owner: New Jersey Transit
- Line: Raritan Valley Line
- Distance: 21.9 miles (35.2 km) from Jersey City
- Platforms: 2 side platforms
- Tracks: 2
- Connections: NJ Transit Bus: 113, 822

Construction
- Parking: Yes
- Accessible: No

Other information
- Fare zone: 10

History
- Opened: 1874
- Rebuilt: July 23, 1892–1893

Key dates
- March 20, 1892: Station depot burns

Passengers
- 2025: 324 (average weekday)
- Rank: 80 of 153

Services
Preceding station	NJ Transit	Following station
Plainfield toward High Bridge	Raritan Valley Line	Fanwood toward Newark Penn or New York
Former services
Preceding station	Central Railroad of New Jersey	Following station
Plainfield toward Scranton	Main Line	Westfield toward Jersey City
Plainfield toward Somerville	Somerville – Jersey City Local	Fanwood toward Jersey City
- Netherwood Station
- U.S. National Register of Historic Places
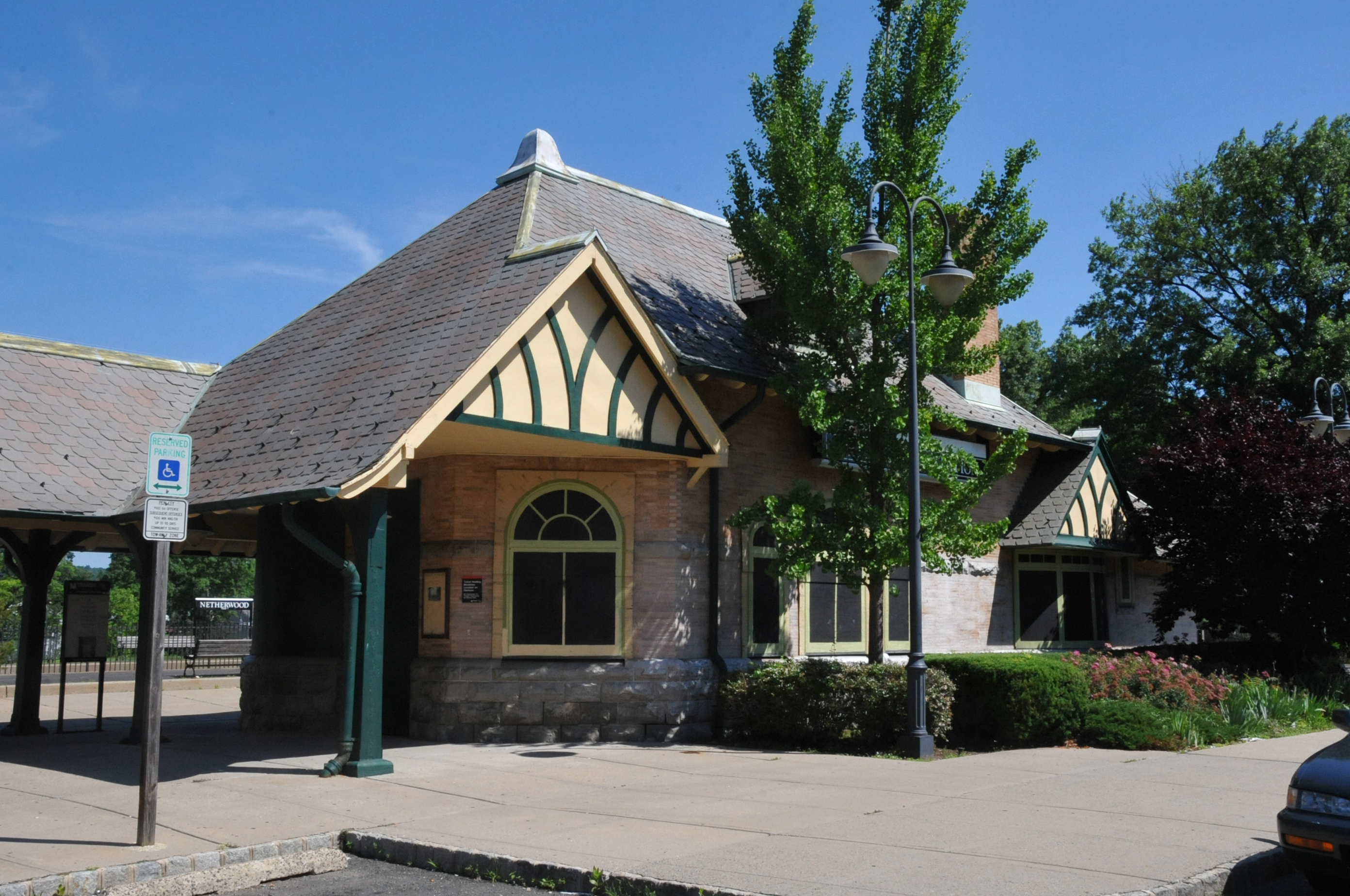
- Netherwood station
- Interactive map of Netherwood Station
- Location: Between North and South Aves., Plainfield, New Jersey
- Coordinates: 40°37′45″N 74°24′13″W
- Area: 0.3 acres (0.12 ha)
- Built: 1894
- Architectural style: Queen Anne, Romanesque, Richardsonian Romanesque
- MPS: Operating Passenger Railroad Stations TR
- NRHP reference No.: 84002830
- Added to NRHP: June 22, 1984
Location

Netherwood is a New Jersey Transit railroad station on the Raritan Valley Line, in Plainfield, Union County, New Jersey, United States. It is located along North Avenue at the intersection of Netherwood Avenue and along South Avenue at the intersection of Belvedere Avenue. The station has a ticket vending machine, and the station house itself is located off of South Avenue.

== History ==
Netherwood station was originally built by the Central Railroad of New Jersey in 1894. As with the rest of the CNJ, the station was subsidized by the New Jersey Department of Transportation in 1964 and absorbed into Conrail in 1976. The station is one of the two surviving CNJ stations in Plainfield (the other being Downtown Plainfield station), whereas the community previously had five; the other three being at Grant Avenue, Clinton Avenue (formerly known as Evona). The station building has been listed in the state and federal registers of historic places since 1984 and is part of the Operating Passenger Railroad Stations Thematic Resource, along with the other active station downtown.

== Station layout ==
The station has two low-level side platforms serving two tracks. The inbound platform is 383 feet (117 m) long while the outbound platform is 381 feet (116 m) long; both can accommodate four cars.

== See also ==
- National Register of Historic Places listings in Union County, New Jersey
- List of New Jersey Transit stations
