= Westfield station (NJ Transit) =

NJ Transit rail station

Westfield
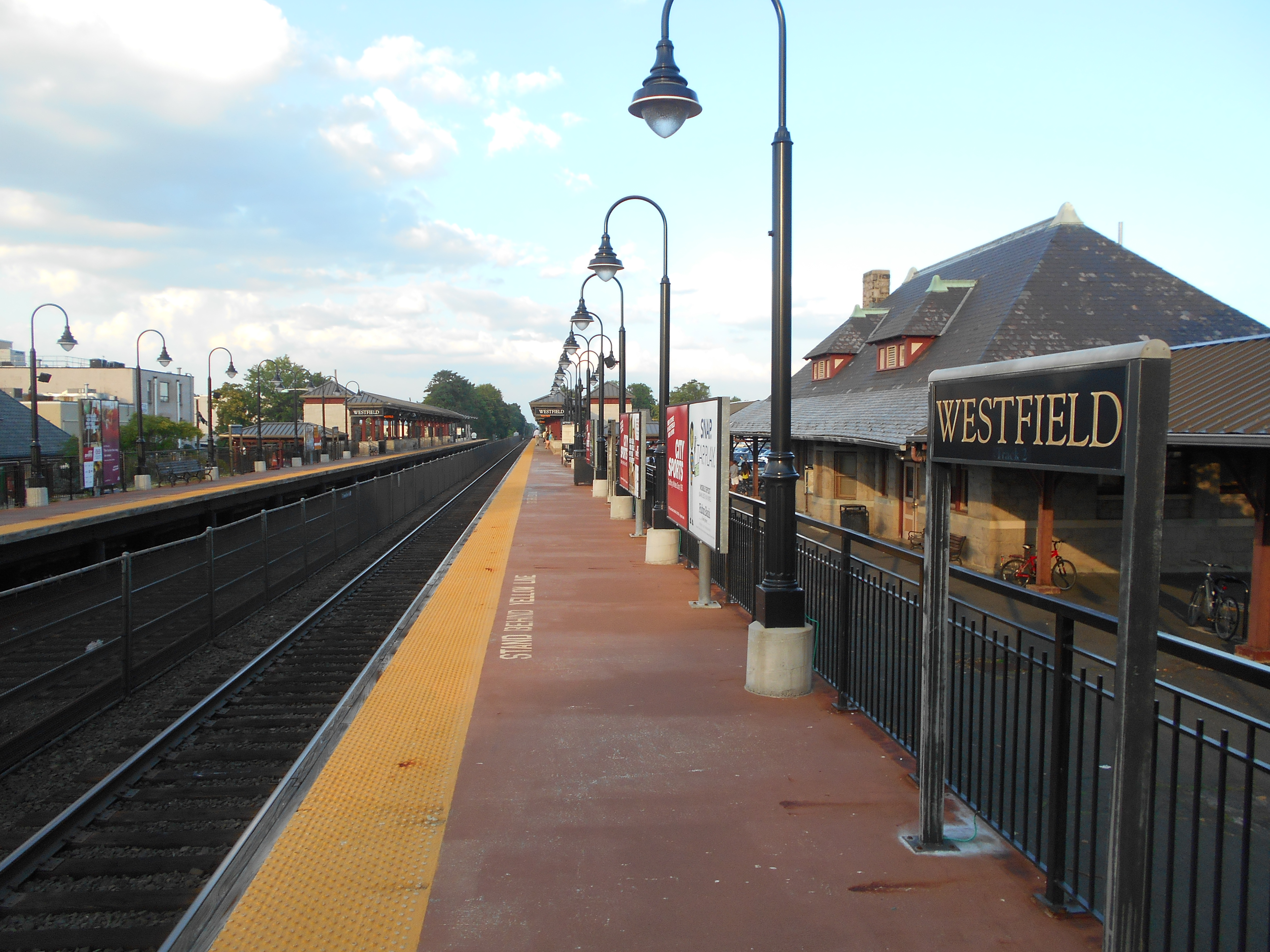
- Westfield station in August 2014.

General information
- Location: South Avenue (CR 610) and Summit Avenue, Westfield, New Jersey
- Coordinates: 40.6496°N 74.3477°W
- Line: Raritan Valley Line
- Distance: 18.5 miles (29.8 km) from Jersey City
- Platforms: 2 side platforms
- Tracks: 2
- Connections: NJ Transit Bus: 59, 113

Construction
- Parking: 711 spaces (698 standard, 13 accessible)
- Accessible: Yes

Other information
- Fare zone: 8

History
- Opened: January 1, 1839
- Rebuilt: 1892 (westbound station); 1913 (eastbound station)

Passengers
- 2025: 1,418 (average weekday)
- Rank: 22 of 153

Services
Preceding station	NJ Transit	Following station
Fanwood toward High Bridge	Raritan Valley Line	Garwood toward Newark Penn or New York
Former services
Preceding station	Central Railroad of New Jersey	Following station
Netherwood toward Scranton	Main Line	Cranford toward Jersey City
Fanwood toward Somerville	Somerville – Jersey City Local	Garwood toward Jersey City
Location

Westfield station is an active commuter railroad station in the town of Westfield, Union County, New Jersey. One of a few stations with two standing railroad depots, Westfield has the eastbound platform on South Avenue (County Route 610) at Summit Avenue and the westbound platform on North Avenue (State Route 28) at Elm Street. Trains at Westfield station run between High Bridge and Newark Penn Station on a regular basis, with limited trains going to New York Penn Station. Westfield station contains two high-level side platforms for train service along with two station depots built by the Central Railroad of New Jersey, connected via a passenger tunnel.

Railroad service in Westfield began on January 1, 1839 with the opening of the Elizabethtown and Somerville Railroad between Elizabethport and Plainfield.

== History ==
Prior to the introduction of railroad service in Westfield Township, the area served as a major stop for stagecoach service. A stagecoach line from Bound Brook to Elizabethport came during the 18th century, replacing one that went to Elizabethtown Point that started c. 1750. The Bound Brook–Elizabethport stagecoach made a stop in Westfield on each trip, making a stop at a local general store operated by Samuel Downer on Broad Street each time. Downer, who served as the local postmaster in Westfield from 1825–1833, served as an early promoter to have a new railroad built from Elizabeth to Somerville.

The Elizabethtown and Somerville Railroad was charted by the state of New Jersey on February 9, 1831. Construction on the new road occurred during 1838 and the railroad opened between Elizabethtown and Somerville on January 1, 1839. The new railroad, a single track line, operated two trains per day with three coaches in each direction. The railroad built the first station in Westfield on Central Avenue (then-known as Mechanic Street) on the north side of the right-of-way. The station doubled as a place where candy and cake were sold by a local Irishman until it burned down. The replacement structure was built at the junction of Clark Street and Broad Street in Westfield, also on the northern side of the tracks. However, the railroad disagreed with this location and moved the station to its present locations on North and South Avenues.

The growth of Westfield during the stagecoach era paled in comparison to the influx that came with the railroad. While the growth of Westfield was slow initially, the railroad brought the population of Westfield over 1,000 people by 1885. From that point forward, the railroad and the growth of schools in the area caused a spike in population. A large population growth occurred in the 1910s south of the tracks.

The railroad announced on June 12, 1891 that they would be building a new station depot at Westfield and that drawings were finished. This would occur at the same time that the Bergen Point station in Bayonne would get a new structure.

In July 1891, the Jersey Central announced that they had provided drawings for a new station at Westfield. This new station, 73 by 33 feet (22 m × 10 m) in length and width respectively, would be built of sandstone from quarries in Stockton and the trimmings would be made of Indiana limestone. The depot would be one of Gothic architecture, with projections in the front and the back. The new depot would have a hardwood interior and be lighted by electricity. Heat would come from steam. A 10-foot (3.0 m) platform would be installed around the depot, with granolithic used as the main base. The existing station depot would become a freight station once the new depot was finished. The expectation was that the new station would be in place by January 1, 1892.

Construction on foundation walls for the new station depot began on October 14, 1891. Despite the hope to be finished by January 1, 1892, delays resulted in a proposed opening moving back one month by mid-December. The majority of the station was finished by March 4, 1892 and at that point, telegraph wires were being installed on the structure. Railroad employees expected that they could enter the new structure around March 7.

Clamoring for a new station on the southbound side of the track began in November 1911 when the Westfield Board of Trade and Retail Merchants' Association requested officials of the Central Railroad of New Jersey do so. This plan would also include building a depression for Elm Street to run through, eliminating a dangerous grade crossing. The railroad responded on February 27, 1912 at a meeting of the joint committee of the Board of Trade and Retail Merchants' Association, where William George Besler announced that a new station would be built starting within sixty days. This new station would be of similar architecture of the 1892 station on the north side of the tracks. This station would have a 20-by-48-foot (6.1 m × 14.6 m) waiting room and a ticket office. Overhang shelters would reach out 200 feet (61 m) in length. The expectation was that the new station would cost around $30,000.

Construction of the new station began at the end of June 1912 with plans to finish it by autumn. The plumbing and heating for the new depot was installed in May 1913 by a contractor from Plainfield. The new heating system would be used for both station depots. By July 1913, the railroad had renovated the existing depot, giving it a new coat of paint and new floors. The electric lighting on the platforms was also improved. The railroad removed the former cement shelter on the south platform and planned to remove an old newsstand and office building from that side of the tracks. Grading work was also being finished for the new platforms.

== Graceland station ==
In March 1891, farmland on the west end of Westfield Township was purchased for the purpose of building a new co-operative community that would be similar to one in the Edward Bellamy utopian book Looking Backward. Around this time, a new billboard appeared along the Jersey Central tracks for "Graceland", the name of the new community. With the newly acquired farmland, the properties were subdivided for new streets and residences. Graceland would feature modern amenities similar to what Bellamy had suggested in his book, including a two-story opera house, store, public library and a modern water works. Asphalt roads and sidewalks would also be installed. Unlike most communities, everything would be done in a co-operative fashion and that all profits would be shared among the people and no one would have an advantage financially. Each residence would be built at the minimum cost of $1,500 (1891 USD) and ones on the main street would cost at least $3,000, limiting membership. No landlords would be present in the community and sick benefits would be provided upon members.

In June 1891, the railroad announced that they would begin construction of a new station at Graceland. This new station depot would have new lawns and flower beds surrounding the station. Passenger service had already been introduced by the end of the month and construction of the depot was under way. The new depot was in place as Graceland officials advertised for prospective buyers in early September 1891.

The railroad station at Graceland had become a target for vandalism by 1895. Vagrants in the area overtook the station on August 4, 1895 by taking railroad ballast and throwing them at the glass and window sashes in the depot.

There was an attempt in August 1898 to get the railroad to have more trains stop at Graceland.

However, by February 1899, the vagrants that had been made themselves present in the area became a problem for the railroad and the community. The tramps as locals called them, felt it necessary that police needed to patrol South Avenue between Graceland station and Fanwood station. In April, Richard Sparks of New Brunswick was robbed by the vagrants on North Avenue at the Graceland depot and lost $16 along with a watch. After finding 60¢ in his pockets, he returned to the railroad at Graceland station and rode on to Newark. On August 24, 1899, two vagrants living in the Graceland station attacked a couple of men walk from Plainfield to Elizabeth, dragging them into the abandoned depot. In the abandoned depot, their clothes were taken by the vagrants left naked. They escaped, running towards Westfield station, where they ran across an officer. Police and others went back to the Graceland station, where the attackers had already fled. Before leaving to continue their journey, locals produced some clothes for the men to wear on their way.

Having abandoned the station depot, the Jersey Central abandoned passenger service at Graceland station in November 1899. Despite that, locals at Graceland began work to request the railroad reinstate service at Graceland by early December. The abandoned station depot at Graceland burned on the evening of November 17, 1900. Word of the fire reached the Westfield brigade, but despite their best efforts, could not save the flaming structure. During the haste to get fire equipment to the fire, a local liveryman who provided horses to the fire department, fell off his horse and broke his arm. Speculation was that the fire started at the hands of highwaymen living in the structure who could have put the fire out themselves. The telegraph wires attached to the building burned down in the blaze.

Despite the station burning, locals continued their efforts to revive passenger service at Graceland station in April 1901, building their own new station depot next to the railroad in attempt to persuade the agency. With the construction of Galvin's Park, a local amusement park, in 1902, hope came that the railroad might build a branch from the former Graceland station site to the park. The man in charge, Dr. Galvin, suggested that the railroad should consider reopening Graceland station in 1903 for his park. T.M. Wells and Company, which owned property near Galvin's Park, suggested that the Westfield Council build a new street to the park and have a new station depot built at Graceland in July 1904.

Graceland became the site of a massive crash on January 27, 1903. A local train had stopped on the Jersey Central main line near Graceland in the midst of a deep fog near a hot box and its brakeman had set the signals to have all trains stop on the railroad. Despite his efforts, including swinging his lantern, an express train, the Royal Blue continued at full speed down the railroad, crashing into the stopped local. The express train's locomotive crashed into the rear passenger car of the local train, sending multiple cars in accordion forward into the cars in front of them. Of the five cars on the local train, three were wrecked in their entirety, while the fourth suffered damage. After crashing into the local, the locomotive on the Royal Blue derailed and overturned onto the side of the tracks, taking the engineer and its fireman with it. The engineer and fireman were taken to Muhlenberg Hospital in Plainfield. The brakeman, who had jumped back on the local train, was killed instantly in the impact. The wrecked cars and locomotive soon caught fire after the impact.

The passengers in the front two cars of the local train and local people worked to get the injured and killed out of the way of the fire. Risking their own lives and catching fire at times, they pulled bodies out of the area. Some people burned in front of the rescue workers fighting a losing battle. The rear cars of the local train caught fire. After the fire had been pulled out, more bodies were pulled out of the fire. Many mangled bodies were pulled out in pieces and charred into an unrecognizable fashion. The parlor cars of the express train became a temporary hospital for those who needed assistance after the crash. The dead bodies were left alongside the tracks until they could be taken to Plainfield for analysis and burial. Only one person had been injured on the Royal Blue outside of the locomotive, a son of John Wanamaker, suffering cuts when he was thrown from a standing position in the impact. He would help the people in the accident after having his hand bandaged. By the morning of the January 28, 24 people had been killed, with 16 bodies pulled from the fire without identification. Eight people died after being pulled from the wreckage.

A final attempt to reinstate service to Graceland station occurred in July 1912, with local residents petitioning the railroad. Stating that there was an increased ridership at Fanwood and Westfield stations from the Graceland neighborhood, that the new station would be reopened. They also suggested that older southern station at Westfield could be moved to Graceland to serve as its depot.

== Station layout ==
The station has two high-level side platforms serving two tracks. The inbound platform is 623 feet (190 m) long while the outbound platform is 624 feet (190 m) long; both can accommodate seven cars.

The station consists of two buildings: the main building on the north (westbound platform) side of the track houses a non-profit group, the south (eastbound platform) side of the tracks houses the ticket office and waiting area and the platform has two ticket vending machines. The present north building was built in 1892, while the present south building was built in 1912 by the Central Railroad of New Jersey. An access tunnel connects the two platforms and, like Cranford, there are historic photographs of Westfield displayed in the tunnel.

== Bibliography ==
- Philhower, Charles Alpaugh (1923). History of Town of Westfield, Union County, New Jersey (PDF). New York, New York: Lewis Historical Publishing Company.
