= Irvington Bus Terminal =

Regional bus terminus in Irvington, New Jersey

Coordinates: 40°43′35″N 74°13′38″W

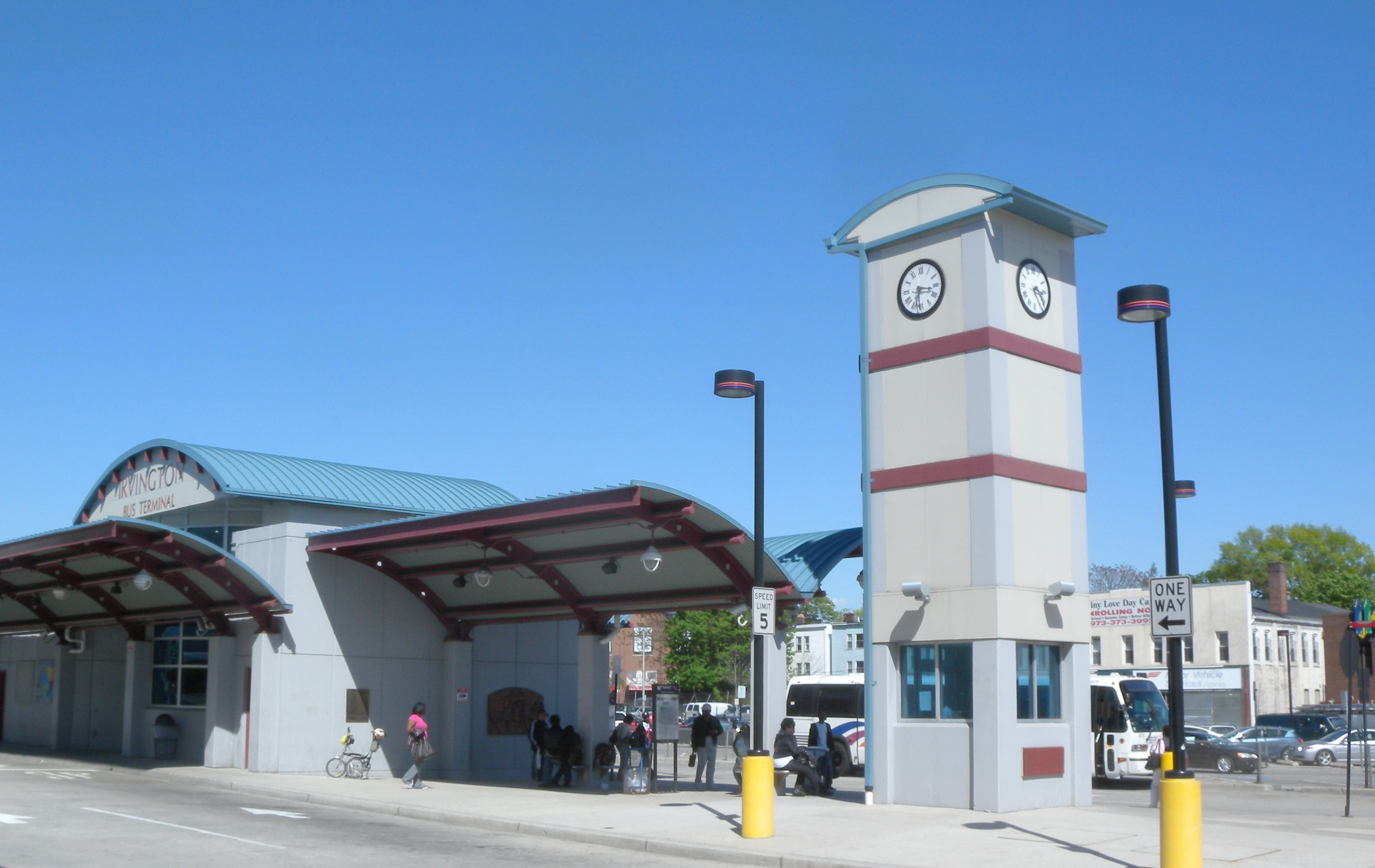
Irvington Bus Terminal

Irvington Bus Terminal is a regional bus terminus located at 1085 Clinton Avenue in Irvington, New Jersey. It is owned and operated by New Jersey Transit (NJT) and is served by buses traveling to Newark and other points in Essex County, to Union and Passaic counties, and to the Port Authority Bus Terminal in Midtown Manhattan. The terminal was originally built in 1947 and underwent significant renovation and expansion in the early 2000s. It is one of the NJT's busiest facilities, daily serving over 12,500 passengers with more than 450 bus trips. and is origination/termination point for one of Greater Newark's bus rapid transit (BRT) lines. In July 2015, the central business district around the terminal was designated a transit village, qualifying it for incentives for revitalization.

== Service ==
Route	Terminals		Via
13	Irvington Bus Terminal	Clifton; Clifton Commons, or Clifton Industrial Park	Downtown Newark; Bloomfield Avenue (Clifton trips only); Washington Avenue (Clifton Commons trips); Broadway, Clinton Avenue
25/go25	Irvington Bus Terminal	Newark Penn Station	Springfield Avenue; Essex County Courthouse; Four Corners
26	Irvington Bus Terminal	Elizabeth	Union Avenue, Liberty Avenue, Morris Avenue
27	Irvington Bus Terminal	Forest Hill or Bloomfield Center (full-time); Delawanna (NJT station) (rush hours only)	Downtown Newark; Hawthorne Avenue, Broad Street, Mount Prospect Avenue; Franklin Street (Bloomfield trips only); Verona Avenue (Forest Hill trips only) Union Avenue, Kingsland Avenue (Clifton trips only)
37	Newark-Ivy Hill	Newark Liberty International Airport	Maplewood; Irvington Bus Terminal; Springfield Avenue; Lyons Avenue
70	Newark Penn Station	Livingston Mall	Irvington Bus Terminal; Maplewood; Summit; Millburn
90	Irvington Bus Terminal	Branch Brook Park (NCS station)	East Orange; Bloomfield
107	Port Authority Bus Terminal	South Orange (NJT station) or Newark-Ivy Hill	some trips via Newark Airport and/or Union City; Lyons Avenue; Irvington Bus Terminal; Irvington Avenue
375	Maplewood	Newark Penn Station or Ironbound	Irvington Bus Terminal; Springfield Avenue; Essex County Courthouse; Four Corners; Newark Penn Station; Ironbound
