= Roselle–Roselle Park station =

Former railway station

Coordinates: 40.6605°N 74.2638°W

Roselle Park Roselle
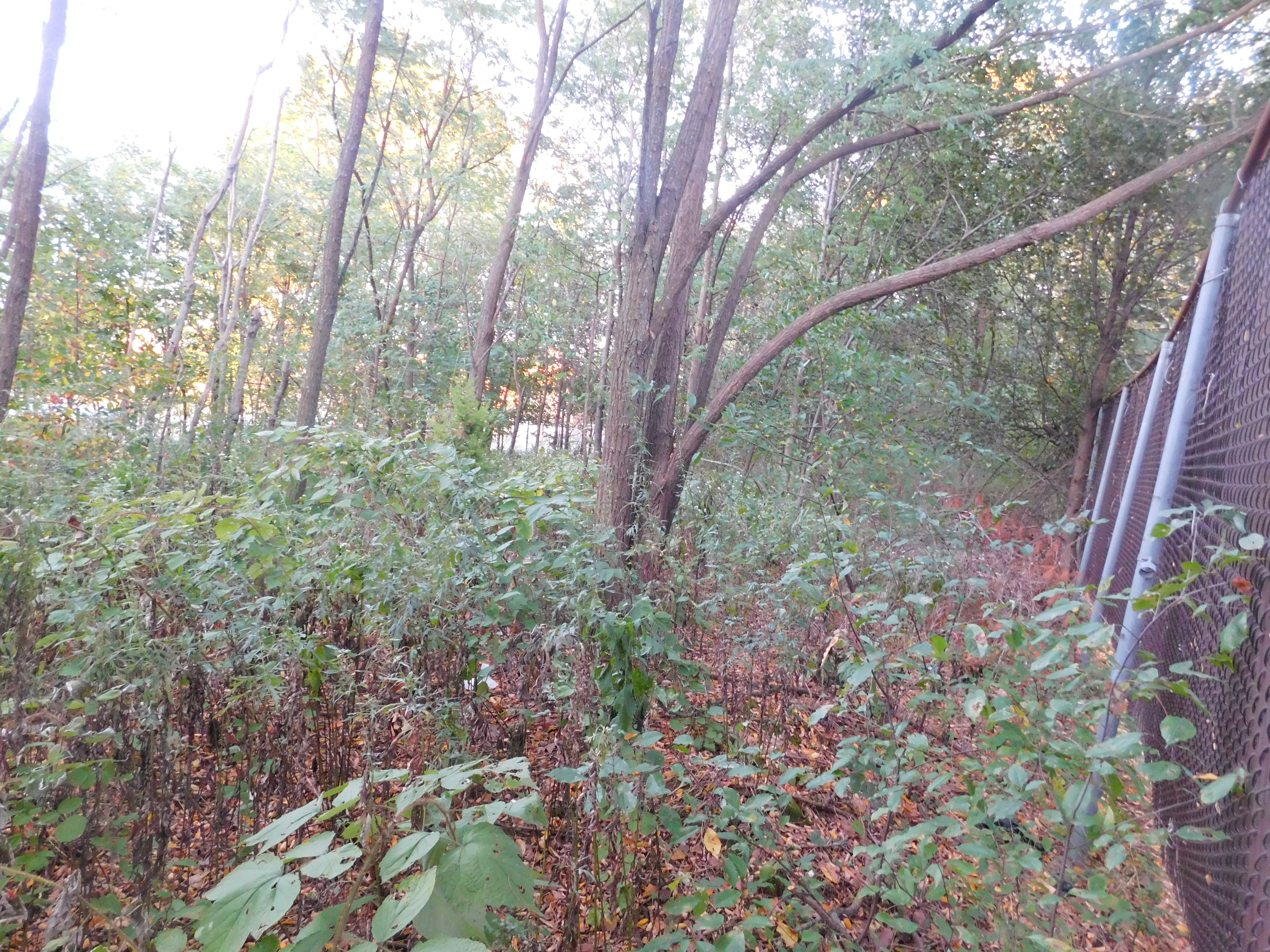
- The site of the abandoned Roselle–Roselle Park station right-of-way in October 2019.

General information
- Location: 107 East First Street, Roselle, New Jersey 07023
- Owner: Central Railroad of New Jersey (–1976); Conrail (1976–1978)
- Lines: Main Line (until 1967); Bayonne Scoots (1967–1978)

History
- Opened: January 1, 1839
- Closed: August 6, 1978
- Rebuilt: 1867; April–September 1901; September 1950–January 27, 1951

Services
Preceding station	Conrail	Following station
Cranford Terminus	Cranford–Bayonne Shuttle	Elmora Avenue toward East 33rd Street
Preceding station	Central Railroad of New Jersey	Following station
Cranford toward Scranton	Main Line	Elizabeth toward Jersey City
Aldene toward Scranton	Main Line	Lorraine toward Jersey City
Location

Roselle–Roselle Park is a former Central Railroad of New Jersey and Conrail station on the border of Roselle and Roselle Park. Located at the junction of East First Street and Chestnut Avenue in Roselle, the station served both communities along the Main Line.

== History ==
Service in Roselle began as a local stop on the Elizabethtown and Somerville Railroad known as Mulford, named after a prominent family living in the Linden area. The first station was opened at the crossing of Union Road and the tracks. The station formed the expansion of the area as John Conklin Rose worked with the Central Railroad of New Jersey to create the Roselle Land Improvement Company in 1866.

A new station was built in 1867 at East First Street and Chestnut Avenue, and renamed Roselle. This second station was a wooden depot that they used for 34 years. A third station at Roselle was built in 1901, dividing the name into Roselle–Roselle Park. Being on the border, the westbound depot (physically in Roselle Park) was named Roselle Park name and the eastbound depot (physically in Roselle) was named Roselle. This third station included a new pedestrian tunnel under the tracks so people need not cross over the tracks and risk injury. The Central Railroad of New Jersey rented out the 1867 depot for residential use once the new station opened.

Roselle–Roselle Park station underwent a total renovation in 1950. As announced by both Roselle and Roselle Park in September 1950, both 1902 station depots would be remodeled. These opened on January 27, 1951, with a 1 pm ceremony at the eastbound depot in Roselle.

Service at Roselle–Roselle Park station became curtailed on May 1, 1967, with the implementation of the Aldene Plan, which rerouted trains from Communipaw Terminal in Jersey City to Newark Penn Station in Newark via Cranford station. The Lehigh Valley Railroad depot at Roselle Park was rebuilt for the new service.

The service between Jersey City and Cranford station would be served by new shuttles known as the Bayonne Scoots. These were discontinued on August 6, 1978 after losing money for years by Conrail and New Jersey Department of Transportation.

== See also ==
- List of stations on the Central Railroad of New Jersey

== Bibliography ==
- Bernhart, Benjamin L. (2004). Historic Journeys By Rail: Central Railroad of New Jersey Stations, Structures & Marine Equipment. Outer Station Project. ISBN 1891402072.
