= Cranford station =

NJ Transit rail station

Cranford
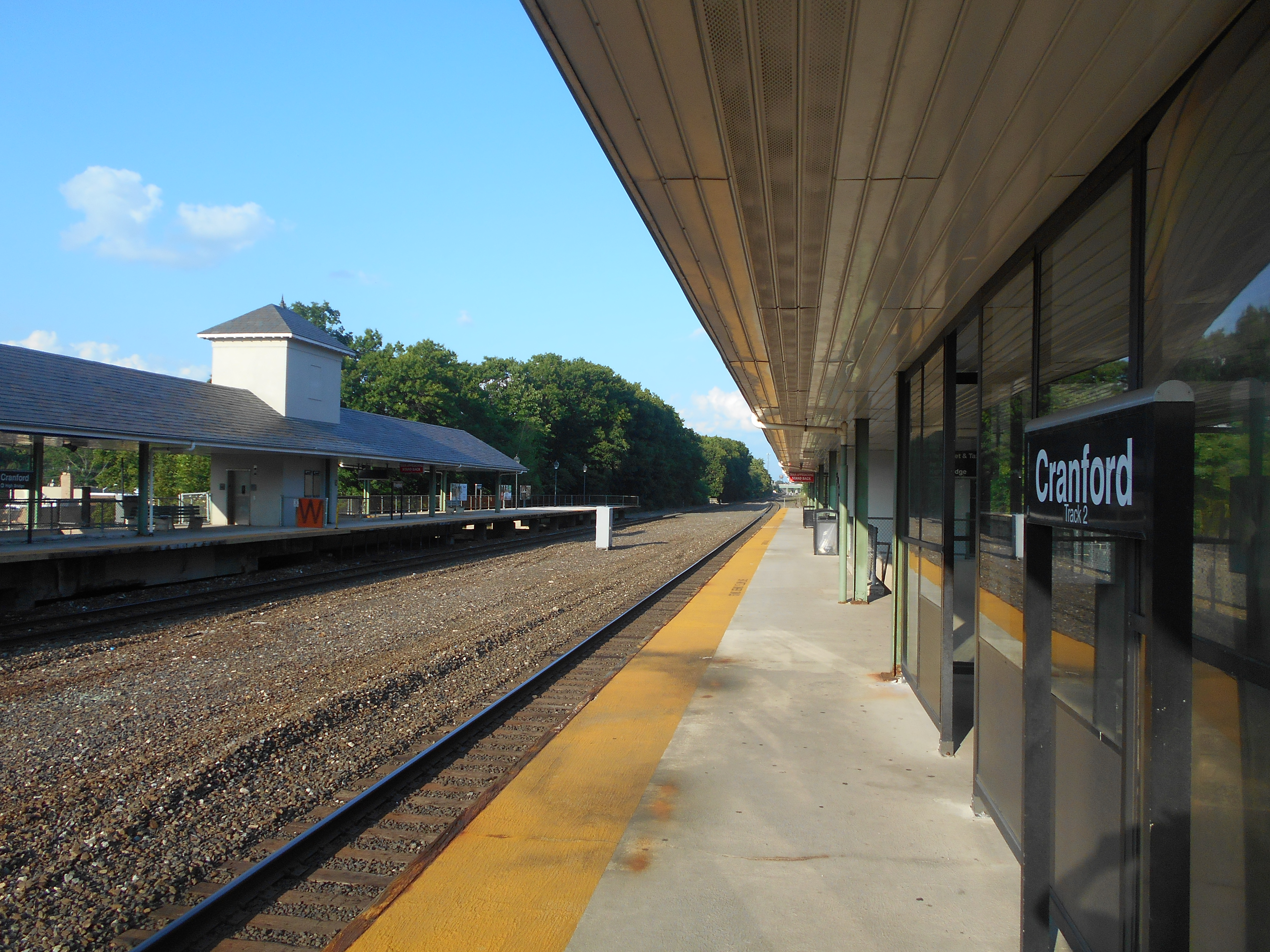
- Cranford station in August 2014.

General information
- Location: South Avenue (CR 610) and High Street, Cranford, New Jersey
- Coordinates: 40.6555°N 74.3028°W
- Line: Raritan Valley Line
- Distance: 16.1 miles (25.9 km) from Jersey City
- Platforms: 2 side platforms
- Tracks: 2
- Connections: NJ Transit Bus: 59, 113

Construction
- Parking: 460 spaces (454 standard, 6 accessible)
- Cycle facilities: Yes
- Accessible: Yes

Other information
- Fare zone: 7

History
- Opened: January 1, 1839
- Rebuilt: 1844; 1869; July 1905–1906; October 1928–May 16, 1930
- Former names: French House (1839–1869)

Passengers
- 2025: 790 (average weekday)
- Rank: 37 of 153

Services
| Preceding station | NJ Transit | Following station |
|---|---|---|
| Garwood toward High Bridge | Raritan Valley Line | Roselle Park toward Newark Penn or New York |
Former services
| Preceding station | Conrail | Following station |
|---|---|---|
| Terminus | Cranford–Bayonne Shuttle | Roselle toward East 33rd Street |
| Preceding station | Central Railroad of New Jersey | Following station |
| Westfield toward Scranton | Main Line | Roselle–Roselle Park toward Jersey City |
| Garwood toward Somerville | Somerville – Jersey City Local | Aldene toward Jersey City |
Location

Cranford is an active commuter railroad station in the township of Cranford, Union County, New Jersey. Trains operate between High Bridge and Newark Penn Station (with limited trains continuing to New York Penn Station and Hoboken Terminal) on New Jersey Transit's Raritan Valley Line. The next station east is Roselle Park while west is Garwood. Cranford station contains two side platforms to service three tracks and is accessible for handicapped persons under the Americans with Disabilities Act of 1990.

== History ==
Cranford station opened as French House with the opening of the Elizabethtown and Somerville Railroad on January 1, 1839. The first station was built in 1844, replaced itself in 1869, when it attained its current name of Cranford. The 1869 depot came down in 1905, replaced with a new depot in 1906. The Central Railroad of New Jersey (CNJ) replaced the station in 1929 and 1930 when they began a track elevation process in October 1928. In 1967, the construction and opening of the Aldene Plan, resulting in the line using the former Lehigh Valley Railroad alignment into Newark rather than continuing to Communipaw Terminal in Jersey City. This resulted in a shuttle service between East 33rd Street station in Bayonne and Cranford station. This service operated until August 6, 1978.

NJ Transit considered Cranford station as a stop of the Union go bus expressway, a bus rapid transit service utilizing the former CNJ alignment between Cranford and Elizabeth.

== Station layout ==
The station has two high-level side platforms serving two tracks. The inbound platform is 645 feet (197 m) long while the outbound platform is 666 feet (203 m) long; both can accommodate six cars.

== Bibliography ==
- Clayton, W. Woodford (1882). History of Union and Middlesex Counties, New Jersey. Philadelphia, Pennsylvania: Everts and Peck.
