= Aldene Connection =

Railroad junction in New Jersey

Coordinates: 40°39′31″N 74°16′49″W

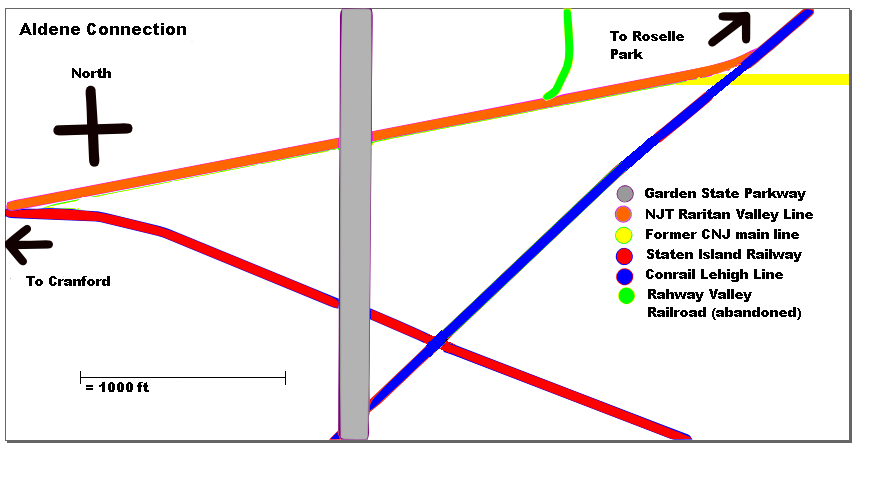
A diagram of the Aldene Connection, showing NJ Transit Raritan Valley Line, former Central Railroad of New Jersey Main Line, Staten Island Railway, Conrail Lehigh Line, and the former Rahway Valley Railroad

The Aldene Connection is a connection between two railroad lines in the Aldene neighborhood of Roselle Park, New Jersey, United States, one formerly belonging to the Central Railroad of New Jersey (CNJ), the other formerly of the Lehigh Valley Railroad. The connections allow trains on the New Jersey Transit Raritan Valley Line to travel from Cranford and points west through stations in Roselle Park and Union to the Hunter Connection in Newark, which in turn allows access to the Northeast Corridor and Newark Penn Station.

== History ==
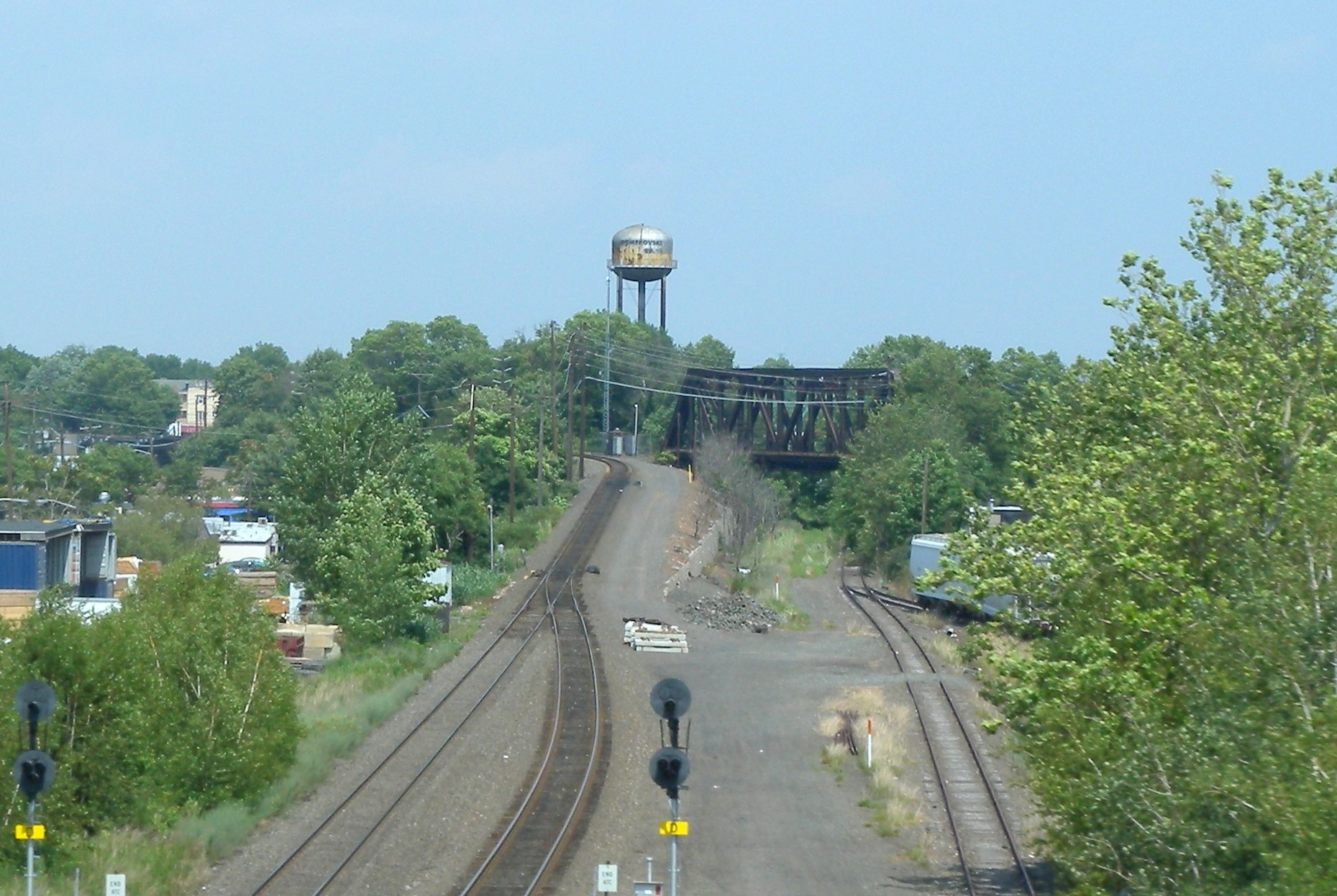
NJ Transit, Conrail, and former CNJ tracks meet at Aldene

The CNJ in the mid-1960s was losing money, in a permanent downward spiral that would lead to the railroad's filing for bankruptcy early in 1967. Desperate to cut costs, the CNJ turned to the state which created a "railroad transportation division" within the highway commission headed up by Dwight R. G. Palmer, who was placed in charge of preserving rail commuter services as a cheaper alternative to a new highway building program. Palmer's office produced a report called "The Rail Transportation Problem" stating that the state should partially subsidize service until more fundamental changes could be made. One of these "fundamental changes" became known as the "Aldene Plan". It would involve the building of a ramp to connect the CNJ and the Lehigh Valley Railroad at the site of the recently abandoned Aldene Station to reroute trains bound for Jersey City to follow the LV to the Pennsylvania Railroad mainline (now the Northeast Corridor) and on to Newark Penn Station where passengers could transfer to PRR trains into New York Penn Station. This would allow the CNJ to abandon its labor-intensive ferry service and much of its Communipaw Terminal in Jersey City, and all local trains operating east of Cranford, all totaling up to about $1.5 million in annual savings. As a concession to a few hundred factory workers that worked along the CNJ east of Aldene, Budd Rail Diesel Cars were operated as the "Bayonne Scoot" between Cranford and Bayonne over the CRRNJ Newark Bay Bridge until August 6, 1978.

Opening day for the Aldene Plan was announced for Monday, May 1, 1967, but a full-service rehearsal occurred the day prior (a Sunday to avoid the commuter rush). The CNJ operated push-pull consists of a cab car leading eastbound. Until 2014, operations remained the same: passengers for New York would disembark at Newark and change to a Northeast Corridor or North Jersey Coast Line train operated by New Jersey Transit to New York Penn Station or PATH trains to the World Trade Center. However, in 2014 NJ Transit began offering a one-seat ride to New York making use of their recently purchased dual mode locomotives, which can change between diesel power and electric power. The trains operate under diesel power on the Raritan Valley Line which has never been electrified. At Newark, the diesel engines are shut down and a pantograph is raised, since only electric trains can operate into New York Penn Station. Currently the dual-mode service is only run during off-peak hours as Penn Station cannot accommodate any more trains during rush hours.

Also affected by the change was the Reading Company's Crusader service from Philadelphia, which operated over the CNJ via trackage rights. After the Aldene Plan went into effect, it began to operate into Newark Penn Station, continuing until 1981 as a through service, and then as a connecting train from West Trenton through 1982. New Jersey Transit has explored reactivating this service as the West Trenton Line.

Concurrent with the start of service via the Aldene Connection was the rerouting of CNJ trains on the NY&LBRR (present-day North Jersey Coast Line) from Perth Amboy to Newark Penn Station via PRR trackage, eliminating the service to Jersey City (Communipaw Avenue) via Elizabethport.

The Aldene Connection is single track, although it is graded to allow a second track to be added.
