= Raritan Valley Line =

Commuter rail line in New Jersey and New York

- Train No. 5175 approaching Raritan station

Overview
- Owner: Amtrak (east of Hunter); Conrail Shared Assets Operations (Hunter to Aldene); New Jersey Transit (Aldene westward)
- Locale: Central and northern New Jersey, U.S.
- Termini: New York Penn Station Newark Penn Station; Raritan High Bridge
- Stations: 20

Service
- Type: Commuter rail
- System: New Jersey Transit Rail Operations
- Operator: New Jersey Transit
- Rolling stock: GP40PH-2, PL42AC or ALP-45 locomotives Comet II IV & V or MultiLevel coaches
- Daily ridership: 13,650 (Q1, FY 2025)

Technical
- Track length: 55.3 mi (89.0 km)
- Track gauge: 4 ft 8 1/2 in (1,435 mm) standard gauge
- Electrification: Overhead line, 12 kV 25 Hz (Newark-New York)
- Operating speed: 80 mph (130 km/h) (top)

The Raritan Valley Line is a commuter rail service operated by NJ Transit (NJT) which serves passengers in municipalities in Union, Somerset, Middlesex, Essex, and Hunterdon counties in the Raritan Valley region, primarily in central New Jersey and a smaller portion of northern New Jersey, in the United States. The line's most frequent western terminus is Raritan station in Raritan. Some weekday trains continue farther west and terminate at the High Bridge station, located in High Bridge. Most eastbound trains terminate at Newark Penn Station; passengers are able to transfer to NJ Transit using a combined ticket or PATH and Amtrak to New York City. A limited number of weekday trains continue directly to New York Penn Station.

Raritan Valley Line trains use three lines owned by three entities. Between High Bridge and the Aldene Connection, east of Cranford, it uses the former Central Railroad of New Jersey Main Line, now owned by New Jersey Transit and also called the Raritan Valley Line. From the Aldene Connection to Hunter it uses Conrail's Lehigh Line, formerly the east end of Lehigh Valley Railroad Main Line. Finally, it uses Amtrak's Northeast Corridor from the Hunter Connection to Newark and New York.

The Raritan Valley Line is colored orange on New Jersey Transit's system map, and its symbol is the Statue of Liberty, an homage to the Central Railroad of New Jersey, whose logo was also the Statue of Liberty.

== Description ==
Most of the line follows the main line of the former Central Railroad of New Jersey. Historically, CNJ trains ran on this line, as part of its Lehigh-Susquehanna Division, from Scranton, Wilkes-Barre, Allentown, Bethlehem and Easton in eastern Pennsylvania through Elizabeth and Bayonne to Jersey City. In peak years of service the line was the basis for trains such as the Queen of the Valley and the Harrisburg Special, reaching as far west as Harrisburg, Pennsylvania.

Until 1967 CNJ service terminated at the company's Communipaw Terminal in what is today Liberty State Park. This station, which was also served by Reading Company trains to Philadelphia and B & O service to Washington, D.C., and beyond, had connections by chartered bus or ferry into Manhattan.

At the end of April 1967, the Aldene Connection opened, connecting the CNJ main line to the Lehigh Valley Railroad (now Conrail's Lehigh Line), and trains were re-routed to Newark Penn Station on the Northeast Corridor via Hunter Connection. This allowed CNJ to end the ferry service between Jersey City and Manhattan, which was losing money.

The former CNJ Main Line was conveyed to Conrail on the former's bankruptcy in 1976. Conrail sold the line to the state of New Jersey in 1978 but continued to operate commuter service under contract. Service on the line was cut back from Phillipsburg to High Bridge on January 1, 1984.

Trains initially could not go beyond Newark Penn Station to New York Penn Station because the locomotives were diesel-powered, and diesel locomotives cannot operate in the North River Tunnels. The introduction of ALP-45DP dual-mode locomotives allows for direct service to New York Penn Station. Limited service to New York Penn Station started as a pilot program on March 3, 2014. Select trains provide one-seat rides to New York. This original "pilot project" schedule has been subsequently expanded to include additional trains, but is limited to off-peak hours due to capacity issues in the Hudson River tunnels.

Unlike the Northeast Corridor, the majority of stations on the Raritan Valley Line are not wheelchair accessible. Newark Penn Station, Union, Cranford, Westfield, Plainfield, and Somerville are accessible high-platform stations. Roselle Park has a high platform but does not have a ramp or elevator to the street.

In September 2018, all Raritan Valley Line service was truncated to Newark Penn Station to allow for positive train control installation. Direct service to New York resumed on November 4, 2019.

== Rolling stock ==
Since it is not electrified, the Raritan Valley Line requires diesel locomotives. The locomotives originally consisted of the GP40PH-2(A and B) and Alstom PL42AC with a 5- or 6-car set of Comet II & IV cars with a Comet V cab car. Since late 2008, Bombardier Multilevel Series Coaches were added and displaced most of the Comet coaches. As of late 2013, the trainsets' consist use an ALP-45DP and a 6- to 8-car set of Multilevels. However, some occasional trains use the Comet coaches coupled with a PL42AC or an ALP-45DP. Some GE P40DC locomotives were occasionally used on the line from 2007 to 2009.

With the initiation of select, direct, service to New York Penn Station on the Raritan Valley Line in March 2014, dual-mode Bombardier ALP-45DP locomotives (combination diesel and electric power) were added to the RVL rolling stock to incorporate the "one seat ride" between Raritan/High Bridge and New York Penn Station. Switching of modes is performed at Newark. The line's rolling stock is stored at the Raritan Yard, the line's only rail yard, located just west of the station of the same name. All eastbound trains change crews here and trains are normally stored here overnight. This is also one of four fueling facilities for NJT locomotives, the other three being Hoboken Terminal, Port Morris, and the Meadows Maintenance Complex. All trains terminating in Newark head to the Meadows Maintenance Complex in Kearny, New Jersey to be stored.

In May and June 2018, NJ Transit leased 10 MARC coaches to be exclusively operated on the Raritan Valley Line. These cars have since been sent back to MARC.

== Proposed extensions ==
=== Phillipsburg ===
Service beyond High Bridge to Phillipsburg Union Station in Phillipsburg was discontinued in December 1983 because of low ridership. Then, in November 1989, the New Jersey Department of Transportation (NJ DOT) severed the rail line between Alpha and Phillipsburg during construction of I-78. This was done in order to avoid having to build an overpass over the out-of-service trackage.

Since 1984, there have been repeated calls for resumption of service to Phillipsburg to relieve traffic congestion on the parallel I-78 and U.S. Route 22. The Raritan Valley Rail Coalition, formed in 1998 by the late U.S. Congressman Bob Franks, sought cost-effective ways to improve mobility, reduce highway congestion, and increase transit ridership along the Raritan Valley Line. Their study was completed in January 2010. In addition, real estate developers have touted former industrial hub Phillipsburg as an excellent candidate for restored commuter rail service, saying "P'burg. . .a good candidate for rail service..."

NJ Transit has been responsive to the idea, and initiated an environmental impact statement. It was determined that service restoration will take approximately four years and cost $90 million.

In 2010, Easton Mayor Sal Panto Jr. promoted the restoration of rail service to Easton or Phillipsburg and possibly Allentown or Bethlehem.

In 2021, Amtrak placed service to Allentown in their 2035 plan, this is possibly via the Raritan Valley Line.

=== West Trenton ===
Another plan that has been proposed is to restore service on the former Reading Railroad's Jersey City branch track between Ewing and Bound Brook which is the current day CSX Transportation Trenton Subdivision, the NJ Transit rail service on the Trenton Subdivision would be NJ Transit's version of the West Trenton Line, providing a direct link to the SEPTA service of the same name and establishing an additional link to Philadelphia. To date, no funding for the proposal has been secured.

== Stations ==
State	Zone	Location	Station	Miles (km) from New York Penn Station	Date opened	Date closed	Connections / notes
NY	1	Manhattan	New York Penn Station	0.0 (0.0)	1910		Amtrak (long-distance): Cardinal, Crescent, Lake Shore Limited, Palmetto, Silver Meteor; Amtrak (intercity): Acela, Adirondack, Carolinian, Empire Service, Ethan Allen Express, Keystone Service, Maple Leaf, Northeast Regional, Pennsylvanian, Vermonter; Long Island Rail Road: Babylon, Belmont Park, City Terminal Zone, Far Rockaway, Hempstead, Long Beach, Montauk, Oyster Bay, Port Jefferson, Port Washington, Ronkonkoma, West Hempstead branches NJ Transit Rail: Gladstone, Montclair-Boonton, Morristown, Northeast Corridor, North Jersey Coast lines New York City Subway: 1, 2, and 3 (at 34th Street – Penn Station (Seventh Avenue)), A, C, and E (at 34th Street – Penn Station (Eighth Avenue)); New York City Bus: M7, M20, M34 SBS, M34A, Q32; Academy Bus: SIM23, SIM24; Flixbus: Eastern Shuttle; Vamoose Bus
NJ	1	Secaucus	Secaucus Junction	5.0 (8.0)	December 15, 2003		NJ Transit Rail: Bergen County, Gladstone, Main, Meadowlands, Montclair-Boonton, Morristown, Pascack Valley, Northeast Corridor, and North Jersey Coast lines Metro-North Railroad: Port Jervis Line; NJ Transit Bus: 2, 78, 129, 329, 353
NJ	1	Newark	Newark Penn Station	10.0 (16.1)	1935		Amtrak (long-distance): Cardinal, Crescent, Palmetto, Silver Meteor, Silver Star; Amtrak (intercity): Acela Express, Carolinian, Keystone Service, Northeast Regional, Pennsylvanian, Vermonter; NJ Transit Rail: North Jersey Coast and Northeast Corridor lines PATH: Newark – World Trade Center; Newark Light Rail: Grove Street – Newark Penn, Broad Street – Newark Penn; NJT Bus: 1, 5, 11, 21, 25, 28, 29, 30, 31, 34, 39, 40, 41, 44, 62, 67, 70, 71, 72, 73, 76, 78, 79, 108, 308, 319, 361, 375, 378, go25, go28 Greyhound Lines
NJ	1	Newark	South Street				
NJ	5	Union	Union	15.3 (24.6)	April 28, 2003		NJ Transit Bus: 26, 52
NJ	7	Roselle Park	Roselle Park	17.2 (27.7)	February 3, 1891		NJ Transit Bus: 94, 113
NJ	7	Cranford	Cranford	19.2 (30.9)	January 1, 1839		NJ Transit Bus: 59, 113
NJ	8	Garwood	Garwood	20.4 (32.8)	August 1892		NJ Transit Bus: 59, 113
NJ	8	Westfield	Westfield	21.6 (34.8)	January 1, 1839		NJ Transit Bus: 59, 113
NJ	8	Westfield	Graceland		June 1891	November 1899	
NJ	9	Fanwood	Fanwood	23.7 (38.1)	January 1, 1839		NJ Transit Bus: 113
NJ	10	Plainfield	Netherwood	25.0 (40.2)	1874		NJ Transit Bus: 113
NJ	11	Plainfield	Plainfield	26.2 (42.2)	January 1, 1839		NJ Transit Bus: 59, 65, 66, 113, 114, 819, 822
NJ	11	Plainfield	Grant Avenue		1885	April 26, 1986	
NJ	11	Plainfield	Clinton Avenue		1872	April 30, 1967	
NJ	12	Dunellen	Dunellen	29.1 (46.8)	January 1, 1840		NJ Transit Bus: 59, 65, 66, 113, 114; Suburban Trails: Dunellen Local
NJ	13	Middlesex	Middlesex		c. 1893	1972	
NJ	14	Bound Brook	Bound Brook	33.3 (53.6)	January 1, 1840		Somerset County Transportation: CAT-1R, Scoot R1, Scoot R2, Davidson Avenue Shuttle (DASH; 851 and 852)
NJ	15	Bridgewater	Bridgewater	34.5 (55.5)			Known as Calco from 1915–1996
NJ	16	Finderne	Finderne		1851	October 29, 2006	Closed due to low ridership
NJ	17	Somerville	Somerville	37.8 (60.8)	January 1, 1842		NJ Transit Bus: 65, 114
NJ	17	Raritan	Raritan	39.0 (62.8)	c. 1851		
NJ	18	North Branch	North Branch	42.5 (68.4)	September 25, 1848		
NJ	19	Whitehouse Station	White House	47.4 (76.3)	September 25, 1848		
NJ	20	Lebanon	Lebanon	51.1 (82.2)	July 4, 1852		
NJ	20	Annandale	Annandale	53.5 (86.1)	July 4, 1852		
NJ	21	High Bridge	High Bridge	55.3 (89.0)	1852		
NJ	21	Glen Gardner	Glen Gardner		July 4, 1852	January 1, 1984	The station was known as Clarkville from 1852–November 1864 and Spruce Run until the early 1870s.
NJ	21	Hampton	Hampton		July 4, 1852	January 1, 1984	
NJ	21	Bethlehem Township	Ludlow–Asbury		c. 1852-1854	1967	
NJ	21	Bloomsbury	Bloomsbury		July 4, 1852	1967	
NJ	21	Phillipsburg	Union Station		July 4, 1852	January 1, 1984	

== Bibliography ==
- Bernhart, Benjamin L. (2004). Historic Journeys By Rail: Central Railroad of New Jersey Stations, Structures & Marine Equipment. Outer Station Project. ISBN 1891402072.
