= Lehigh Line Connection =

Railroad junction in New Jersey, United States

Coordinates: 40.7130°N 74.1866°W

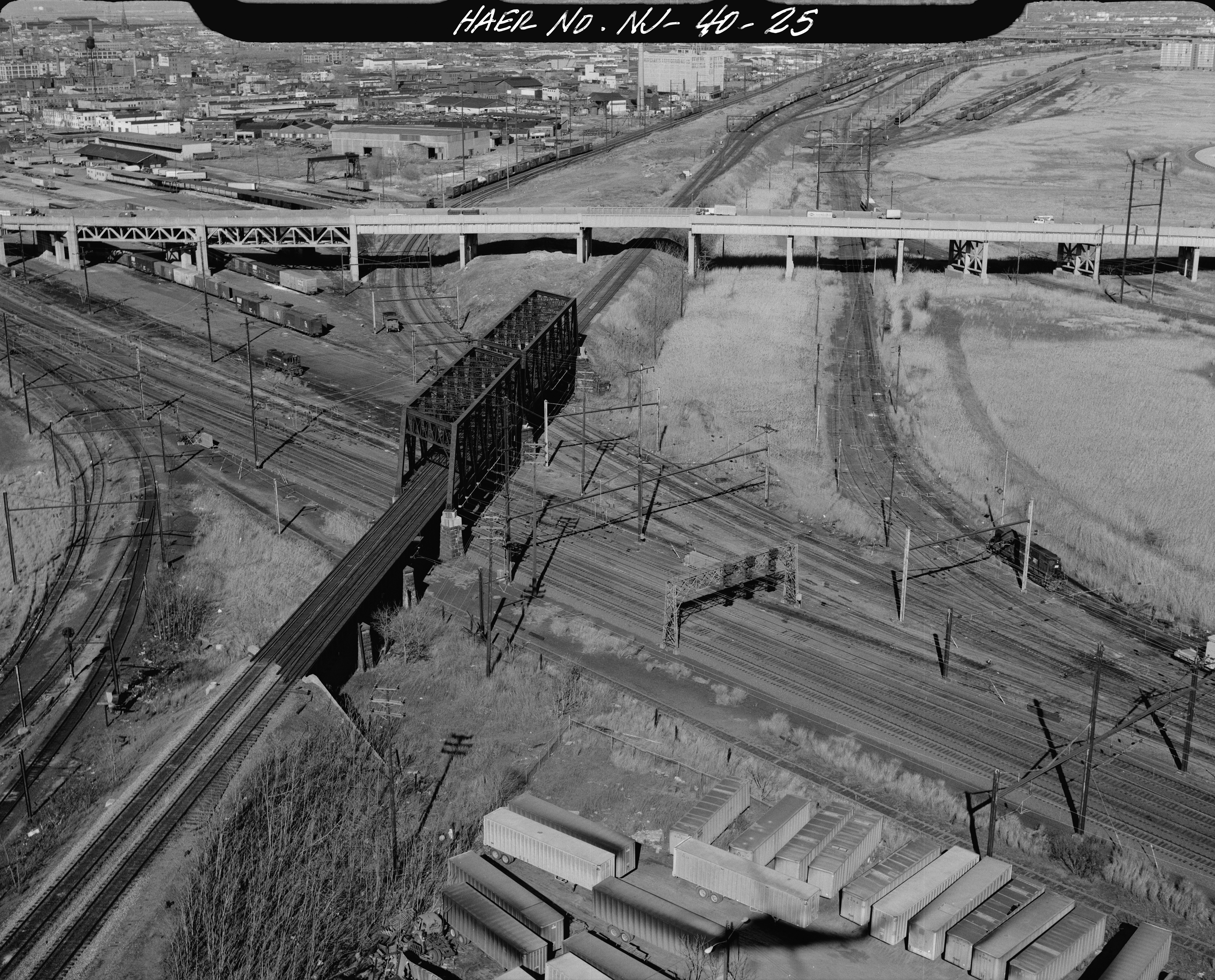
The pre-1997 connection is at bottom left of photo looking east; the new connection was built just to the north.

The Lehigh Line Connection connects Amtrak's Northeast Corridor (NEC) with the Conrail Lehigh Line 2 miles (3.2 km) south of downtown Newark, New Jersey. It leaves the NEC at Hunter Interlocking, and the line is sometimes called the Hunter Connection. Used by New Jersey Transit (NJT) Raritan Valley Line trains since 1997 when it replaced an older connection, it splits from the NEC just north of the former connector, with wider radius curves with a maximum speed of 45 mph, compared to the 15 mph of the original alignment.

The old connection had a single track with older overhead wire and Pennsylvania Railroad (PRR) signaling. Until 1961 Lehigh Valley Railroad (LV) passenger trains bound to/from New York Penn Station, such as the Black Diamond, used the connection to reach their own railroad from the PRR main line. At the top of the hill at NK interlocking, LV diesels exchanged the train(s) with PRR electric locomotives. Despite the lack of electrification on the line past the connection, the new trackage is also equipped with catenary wire.

Amtrak and NJT have proposed constructing the Hunter Flyover, which would carry Newark-bound Raritan Valley Line trains up and over the six-track NEC main line. Currently, Raritan Valley trains heading toward Newark have to cross three or four tracks at grade to access the eastbound tracks at Newark. This flyover would remove many directional conflicts between trains and reduce delays on the NEC. The project would cost $250 million and is currently undergoing environmental analysis.
