= Delaware, Lackawanna & Western Railroad Station =

Delaware, Lackawanna & Western Railroad Station, or variations, may refer to:

in the United States

(by state)

- Delaware Lackawanna and Western Railroad Station (Morristown, New Jersey), listed on the NRHP in New Jersey
- Hoboken Terminal, listed on the NRHP in New Jersey
- Delaware, Lackawanna and Western Railroad Station (Boonton, New Jersey), listed on the NRHP in New Jersey
- Delaware, Lackawanna and Western Railroad Station (Dover, New Jersey), listed on the NRHP in New Jersey
- Delaware, Lackawanna & Western Railroad Station (Leicester, New York), listed on the NRHP in New York
- Delaware, Lackawanna & Western Railroad Station (Painted Post, New York), listed on the NRHP in New York
- Delaware, Lackawanna and Western Railroad Station (Scranton, Pennsylvania), listed on the NRHP in Pennsylvania
