= PABCO Transit =

Bus operator in Morris County, New Jersey

NJ Transit Morris, Inc. PABCO Transit, Inc
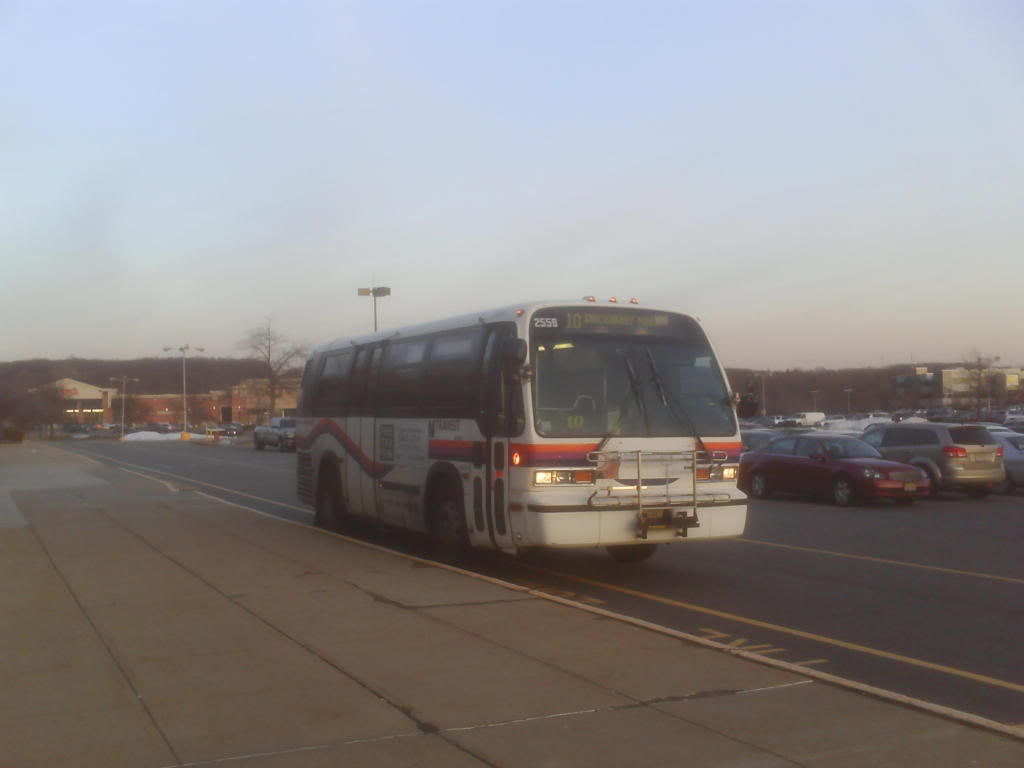
- NJ Transit/PABCO Transit #2559 at Rockaway Mall.
- Parent: New Jersey Transit Corporation/ Morris County DOT
- Headquarters: 34 Richboynton Rd; Dover, NJ 07801
- Locale: Morris County
- Service area: Morris County
- Service type: Local bus service, shuttle service
- Routes: 7
- Fleet: 13
- Fuel type: Diesel
- Operator: PABCO Transit, Inc.
- Website: Official Website

NJ Transit Morris, Inc., formerly PABCO Transit, Inc. (doing business under the Morris County Metro brand), is a subsidiary of New Jersey Transit Corporation based in Dover, New Jersey operating local bus services in Morris County. The company was originally called Passaic – Athena Bus Lines which operated service in Passaic and Clifton, New Jersey.

With a merger into NJ Transit in late 2010, PABCO has been renamed as NJ Transit Morris, Inc. (a subsidiary of NJ Transit), which presently operates the 871, 872, 873, 874, 875 and 880 routes at the Dover Garage on Richboynton Road with a fleet of 13 30-foot coaches.

== Current routes ==
Service is funded by the Morris County Board of Chosen Freeholders. Service operates Monday through Saturday unless noted. Routes are based from NJT Morris Garage on Richboynton Road in Dover with a central transfer hub for all routes at Morristown rail station.

Route	Terminals		Major streets traveled	Notes
871	Morristown; Headquarters Plaza	Willowbrook Mall	Parsippany Road; Route 202; Route 23	Some trips only operate between Morristown and Boonton.; Formerly MCM1.
872	Morristown station	Parsippany – Troy Hills; Mack-Cali	Route 202; Route 10	Route shortened from Livingston Mall to Mack-Cali in Parsippany-Troy Hills as of 9/5/15.
873	Livingston Mall	Parsippany – Troy Hills; Central Avenue & Medical Drive	John F. Kennedy Parkway; Route 124; West Hanover Avenue	Formerly MCM3.
874	Morristown; Headquarters Plaza	Willowbrook Mall	North Jefferson Road; Route 46	
875	Ledgewood Mall	Morristown station	Route 10; Route 53; Route 202	Formerly parts of MCM2.
880	Rockaway Townsquare Mall	Morristown station	West Main Street; Route 46; Route 53; Route 202	Formerly MCM10.

== Morris County Metro ==
=== Renumbered routes ===
In October 2010, New Jersey Transit decided to take over these routes and split them into routes 871–875 and 880 by a newly created subsidiary called NJ Transit Morris, Inc. Morris County still funds their operation. These routes are part of the Central Division.

Route	Terminal A	Major streets	Terminal B	History	New number
MCM1	Morristown Hyatt	Allentown Road; Longwood Avenue; Vail Road; Longwood Avenue; Vreeland Avenue; Route 202	Willowbrook Mall, or Boonton RR station	Route started by Watchung Mountain Transit/Morris County in 1972	871 874
MCM2	Morristown Hyatt or Morristown Station	East Hanover Road; Littleton Road; Route 10; Penn Avenue	County College of Morris	Route started by Watchung Mountain Transit/Morris County in 1972	872
MCM3	Morris Plains; Morris County Offices, or Greystone Park Psychiatric Hospital	Speedwell Avenue; Route 124	Livingston Mall	Route spun off from Transport of New Jersey Route 70 in 1976	873
MCM10	Morristown Hyatt	Speedwell Avenue or Ridgedale Avenue; Mount Tabor Road; Main Street; Blackwell Street; Mount Pleasant Avenue	Rockaway Townsquare	Route replaced Morris County Traction Company streetcars in 1928. Route was briefly discontinued in February 1970 until Morris County intervention	880

=== Previously discontinued routes ===
On June 1, 2010, New Jersey Transit has decided to stop funding the following routes leading to their discontinuation at the end of June.

Route	Terminal A	Major streets	Terminal B	History
MCM4	Morristown, or Morris Township; Honeywell (to AM, from PM)	Routes 510 and 513, via Chester	Chester; Routes 513 and 206, OR; Dover, New Jersey; Townpath Square (from AM, to PM)	Service started in 1980 by Morris County DOT
MCM5 (Monday/Wednesday only)	Morristown	Routes 510, 513, 182, and 46, via Hackettstown	Rockaway Townsquare	Service started in 1980s by Morris County DOT
MCM7 (Tuesday/Friday only)	Randolph; K-Mart Plaza	Mount Hope Avenue; Berkshire Valley Road	Lake Swannanoa; Berkshire Valley Road/Dover–Milton Road	Service started in 1980s by Morris County DOT

== Passaic-Athenia Bus Co. ==
The Passaic-Athenia Bus Co. (originally Red Star Transportation up until 1922) operated the following routes before NJ Transit's takeover and contracting of the routes. The 702 was co-operated with Garfield & Passaic Transit as their #6 route and Community as its #1 route.

Current NJT Route Number	Terminal A	Main streets of travel	Terminal B
702	Paterson; St. Joseph's Hospital (Main St/Mary St.)	Van Houten Avenue; Palisade Avenue or Dayton Avenue; Boulevard	Elmwood Park; Boulevard/Broadway
705	Passaic; Main Avenue Terminal	Clifton Avenue; Main Street	Willowbrook Mall
