= Denville station =

NJ Transit rail station

Denville
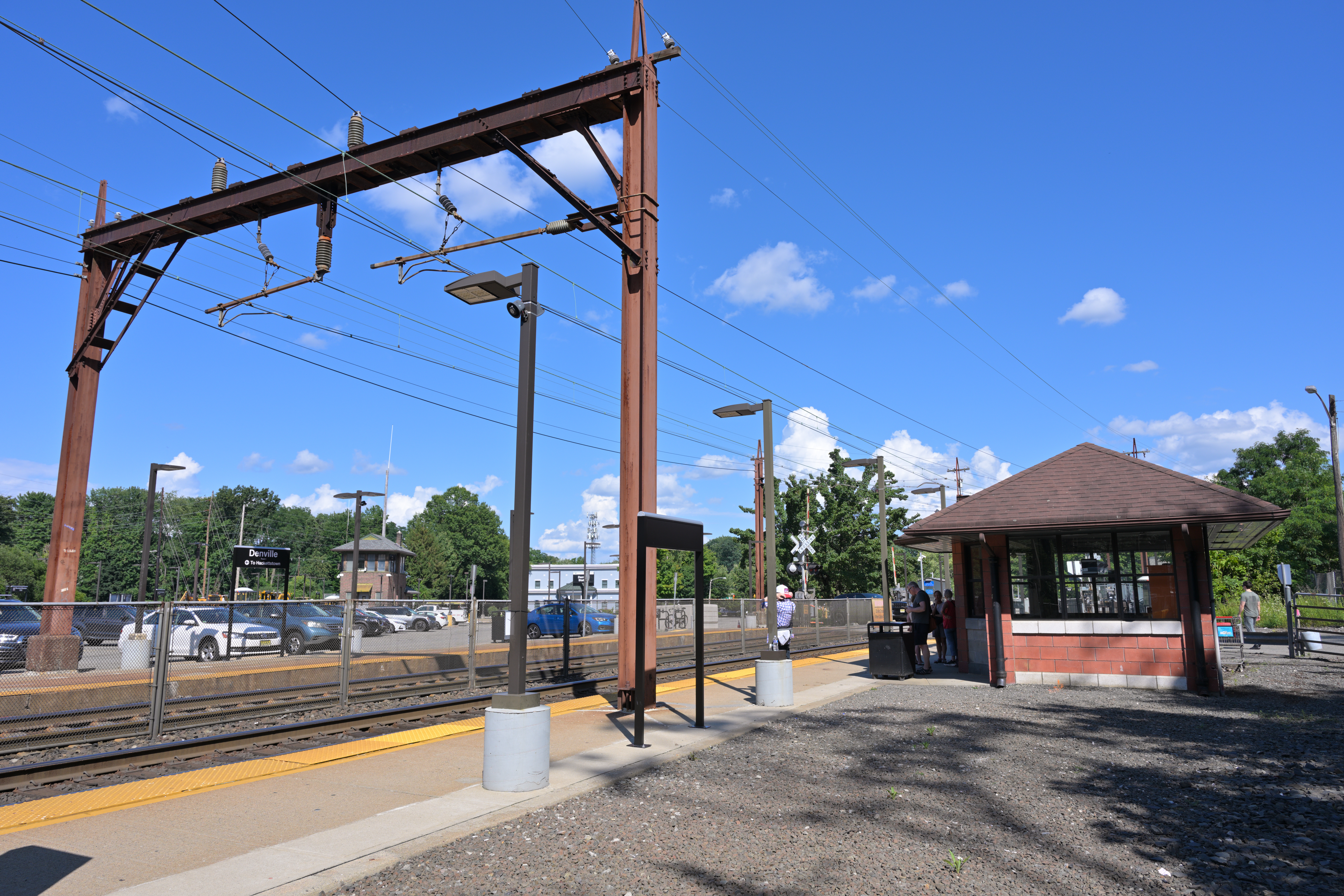
- Denville station's Morristown Line platform

General information
- Location: Estling Road and Main Street, Denville, New Jersey
- Coordinates: 40°53′2″N 74°28′52″W
- Owner: NJ Transit
- Platforms: 3 side platforms
- Tracks: 4
- Connections: NJ Transit Bus: 880

Construction
- Accessible: yes

Other information
- Station code: 34 (Boonton Branch); 436 (Morris and Essex Railroad)
- Fare zone: 16

History
- Opened: July 4, 1848
- Electrified: January 22, 1931 (Morristown Line only)

Key dates
- October 18, 1948: Rockaway Branch service discontinued
- September 21, 1991: Station depot burned

Passengers
- 2025: 324 (average weekday)
- Rank: 81 of 153

Services
Preceding station	NJ Transit	Following station
Dover toward Hackettstown	Montclair–Boonton Line limited service	Mountain Lakes toward New York or Hoboken
Dover toward Hackettstown	Morristown Line	Mount Tabor toward New York or Hoboken
Former services
Preceding station	Delaware, Lackawanna and Western Railroad	Following station
Dover toward Buffalo	Main Line	Mount Tabor toward Hoboken
Terminus	Boonton Branch	Mountain Lakes toward Hoboken
Rockaway toward Dover	Rockaway Branch	Terminus
Location

Denville is an active commuter railroad train station in Denville Township, Morris County, New Jersey. Located on Estling Road, the station contains three side platforms–two curved low-level platforms that service New Jersey Transit's Morristown Line, and a third that services their Montclair–Boonton Line. Both platforms on the Morristown Line contain miniature high-level platforms for handicap accessibility. Trains on both lines operate between Hoboken Terminal, New York Penn Station and Hackettstown. Heading westbound, the next station is Dover while the next station east on the Morristown Line is Mount Tabor. The next station east on the Montclair–Boonton Line is Mountain Lakes.

Railroad service in Denville began with the opening of the extension of the Morris and Essex Railroad to Rockaway from Morristown on July 4, 1848, with the extension to Dover opening just 27 days later. At the time, the line went due north the current station, running via Rockaway Township to reach Dover. As a result, the original Denville station was on Route 53 in Denville rather than its current location. The Delaware, Lackawanna and Western Railroad opened its then-freight-only Boonton Branch on September 5, 1867.

In 1903, the railroad eliminated the crossing between the Morris and Essex Railroad and Boonton Branches, re-designing it into a wye. At this time, the railroad built a new wooden station depot in the wye. Service via Rockaway was reduced to a branch line the railroad would discontinue on October 18, 1948. Electrification of the station came on January 22, 1931 when service between Dover and Hoboken began via Morristown. The station depot caught fire on September 21, 1991.

== History ==
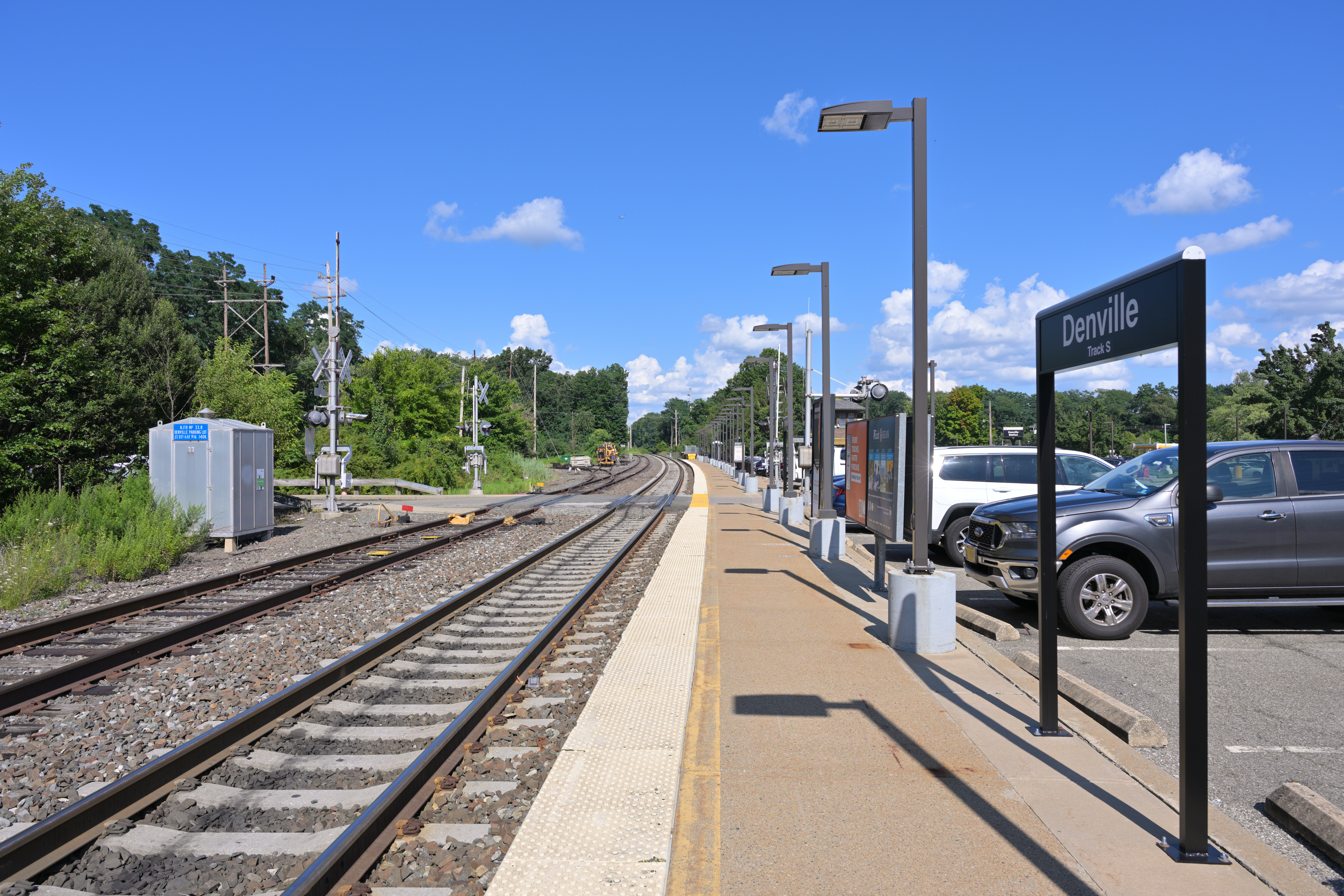
Denville station's Montclair-Boonton Line platform

Prior to the electrification of the Morristown Line in the 1930s, Morristown line trains crossed the Boonton Branch at a right angle, just east of Denville Tower, and continued northwesterly toward Rockaway. From Rockaway, the trains headed southwesterly into Dover. As part of the electrification project, the Morristown line was curved westward and joined the Boonton line in its present location. The track segment between Denville and Rockaway saw limited service after the 1930s, with service on the Rockaway Branch ending on October 18, 1948. Interstate 80 now occupies a short portion of the right-of-way. The New Jersey State Historic Preservation Office considered adding the building to the State Register of Historic Places; however, this never went through, and the station was demolished in 1992 after a fire on September 21, 1991. The Denville Interlocking Tower has been found eligible for the State and National Registers of Historic Places.

== Station layout ==
The Montclair–Boonton Line has one track and one low-level side platform serving inbound trains during the morning rush and outbound trains in the evening rush. The Morristown Line has two tracks, each with a mini-high and low-level side platform. The three tracks merge into two just west of the station.

== See also ==
- Boonton Branch

== Bibliography ==
- Blanco, Vito (2001). Images of America: Denville. Mount Pleasant, South Carolina: Arcadia Publishing. ISBN 9780738509075.
- Lyon, Isaac S. (1873). Historical Discourse on Boonton, Delivered Before the Citizens of Boonton at Washington Hall, on the Evenings of September 21 and 28, and October 5, 1867. Newark, New Jersey: The Daily Journal Office.
- Platt, Charles Davis (1922). Dover Dates, 1722-1922: A Bicentennial History of Dover, New Jersey, Published in Connection with Dover's Two Hundredth Anniversary Celebration Under the Direction of the Dover Fire Department, August 9, 10, 11, 1922. Dover, New Jersey: Charles Davis Platt.
