= Mountain Lakes station =

NJ Transit rail station

Mountain Lakes
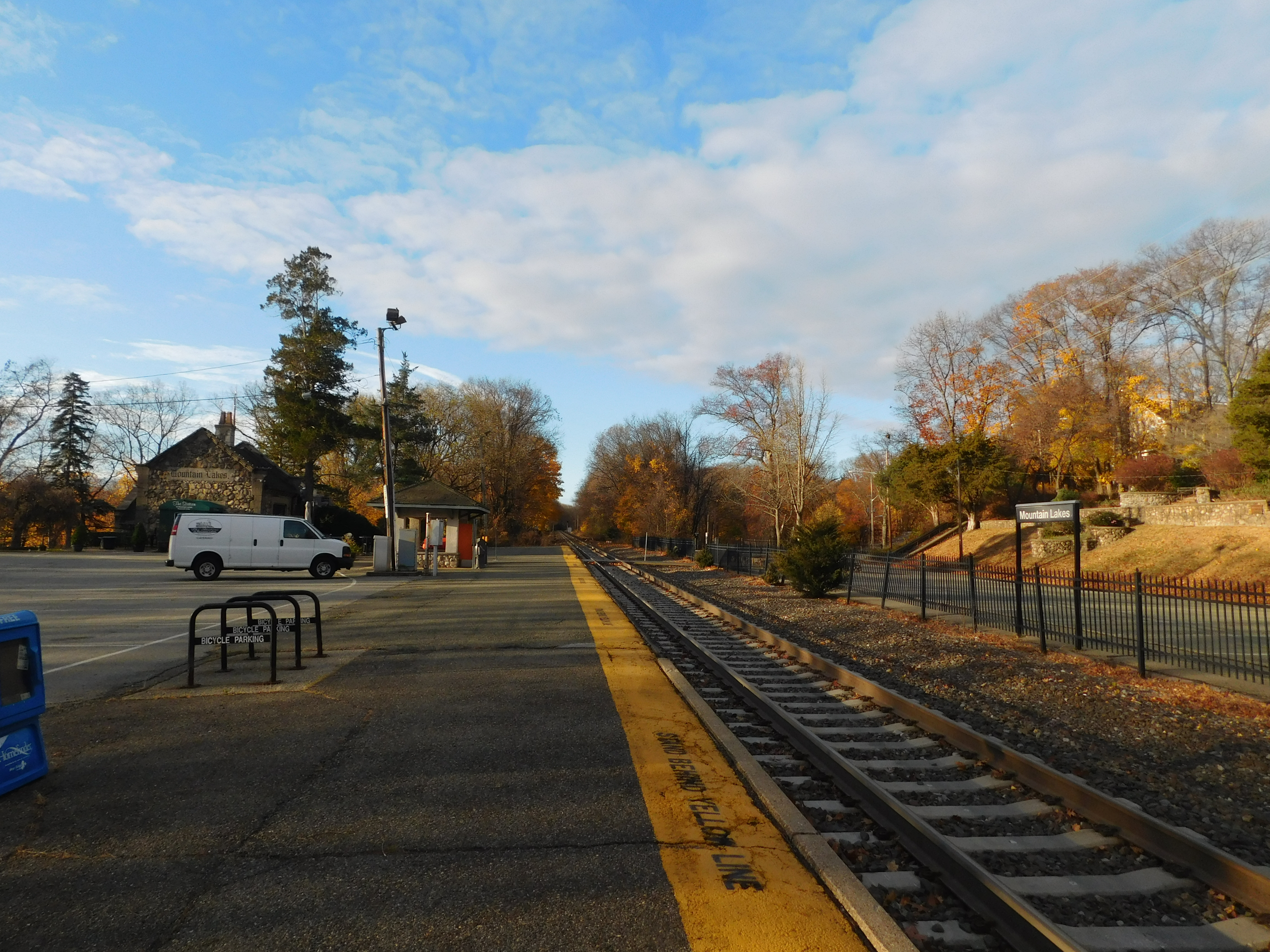
- The Mountain Lakes station facing the Denville-bound direction. The 1912-built depot (now a restaurant) is visible in the distance.

General information
- Location: 99 Midvale Road, Mountain Lakes, New Jersey 07046
- Coordinates: 40.8859°N 74.4336°W
- Owner: NJ Transit
- Platforms: 1 side platform
- Tracks: 1

Other information
- Station code: 31 (Delaware, Lackawanna and Western)
- Fare zone: 14

History
- Opened: November 10, 1912

Passengers
- 2025: 11 (average weekday)
- Rank: 153 of 153

Services
| Preceding station | NJ Transit | Following station |
|---|---|---|
| Denville toward Hackettstown | Montclair–Boonton Line limited service | Boonton toward New York or Hoboken |
Former services
| Preceding station | Delaware, Lackawanna and Western Railroad | Following station |
|---|---|---|
| Denville toward Dover | Boonton Branch | Boonton toward Hoboken |
- Mountain Lakes station
- U.S. Historic district – Contributing property
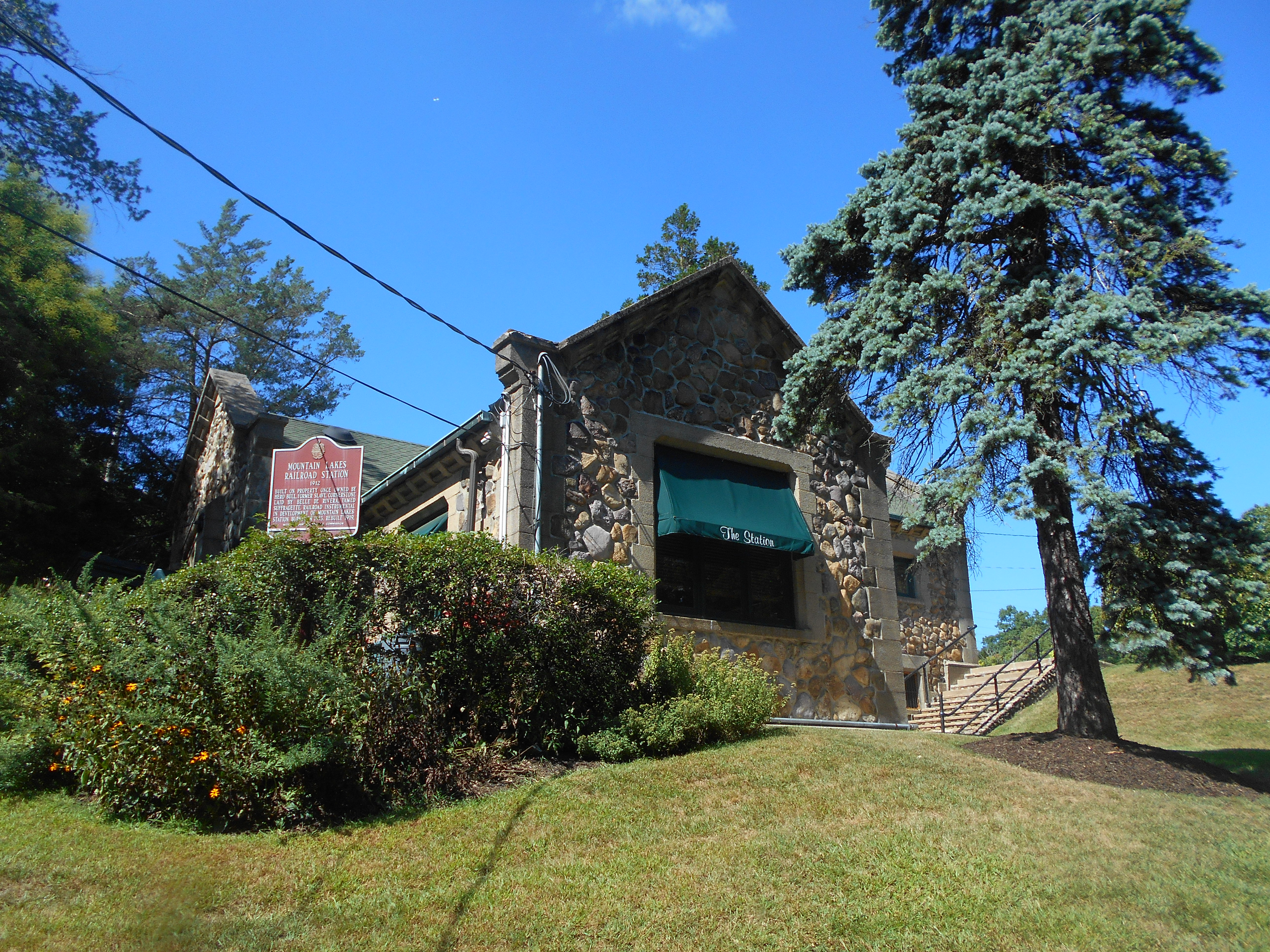
- The station depot from Midvale Road in September 2014.
- Part of: Mountain Lakes Historic District (ID05000963)
- Added to NRHP: September 7, 2005
Location

Mountain Lakes is a commuter railroad station in the borough of Mountain Lakes, Morris County, New Jersey, United States. The station is on New Jersey Transit's Montclair–Boonton Line, the last before the line merges with the Morristown Line at Denville station to the west. The station has one low-level side platform, serving a solo track. The 1912-built William Hull Botsford station depot stands on the single platform, along with an ornate station shelter. The next station to the east of Mountain Lakes is Boonton.

The Mountain Lakes station opened on November 10, 1912, replacing the former station at Fox Hill on Newark Turnpike (modern-day U.S. Route 46), which itself was part of the original Delaware, Lackawanna and Western Railroad's Boonton Branch, which opened on September 5, 1867. Herbert Hapgood, the developer of Mountain Lakes, and local residents requested in 1912 to construct a new station in the Mountain Lakes development. The station is part of the Mountain Lakes Historic District, a National Register of Historic Places designation.

== History ==
Railroad service through Boonton Township, New Jersey began with the construction of the Boonton Branch of the Delaware, Lackawanna and Western Railroad (DL&W). In order to build the railroad through the area, the railroad purchased a 200 feet (61 m) right-of-way through the Parsippany Woods area. This property included land owned by Hero Bull, a former slave and landowner living in Rockaway Township. The owners at the time of construction was John and Abraham Crowell, nephews of Bull, and it was John Crowell that offered the land on the lot to the railroad in 1866. Service from the main line at Denville to the station at Boonton began on September 5, 1867 as part of a freight bypass being built through Morris, Passaic and Bergen counties. Full service through the area began with the line opening to Hoboken and the Hudson River in 1870. On September 10, 1870, full freight service began with coal service running via Paterson. Regular passenger service began on December 14, 1870.

The first station to the east of Denville was the Fox Hill station in Hanover Township (now part of Parsippany–Troy Hills). Fox Hill station was the site of a switch for the local Howell Brothers. The location of the Fox Hill station was on the Newark Turnpike (current-day U.S. Route 46), near the grade crossing. The station served as a junction for a switch to the spur from the Boonton Branch to ice houses in Fox Hill Lakes. The Howell Brothers operated them as Howell Ponds for the Pocono Ice Company. Fox Hill station also contained a coal yard, feed house and a railroad siding. The Fox Hill station also served as the western terminus of a new alignment of the Boonton Branch built in 1897 to remove a reverse curve in the area. As part of this, the railroad straightened the branch to west of Boonton station. The first train passed over the alignment on November 28, 1897.

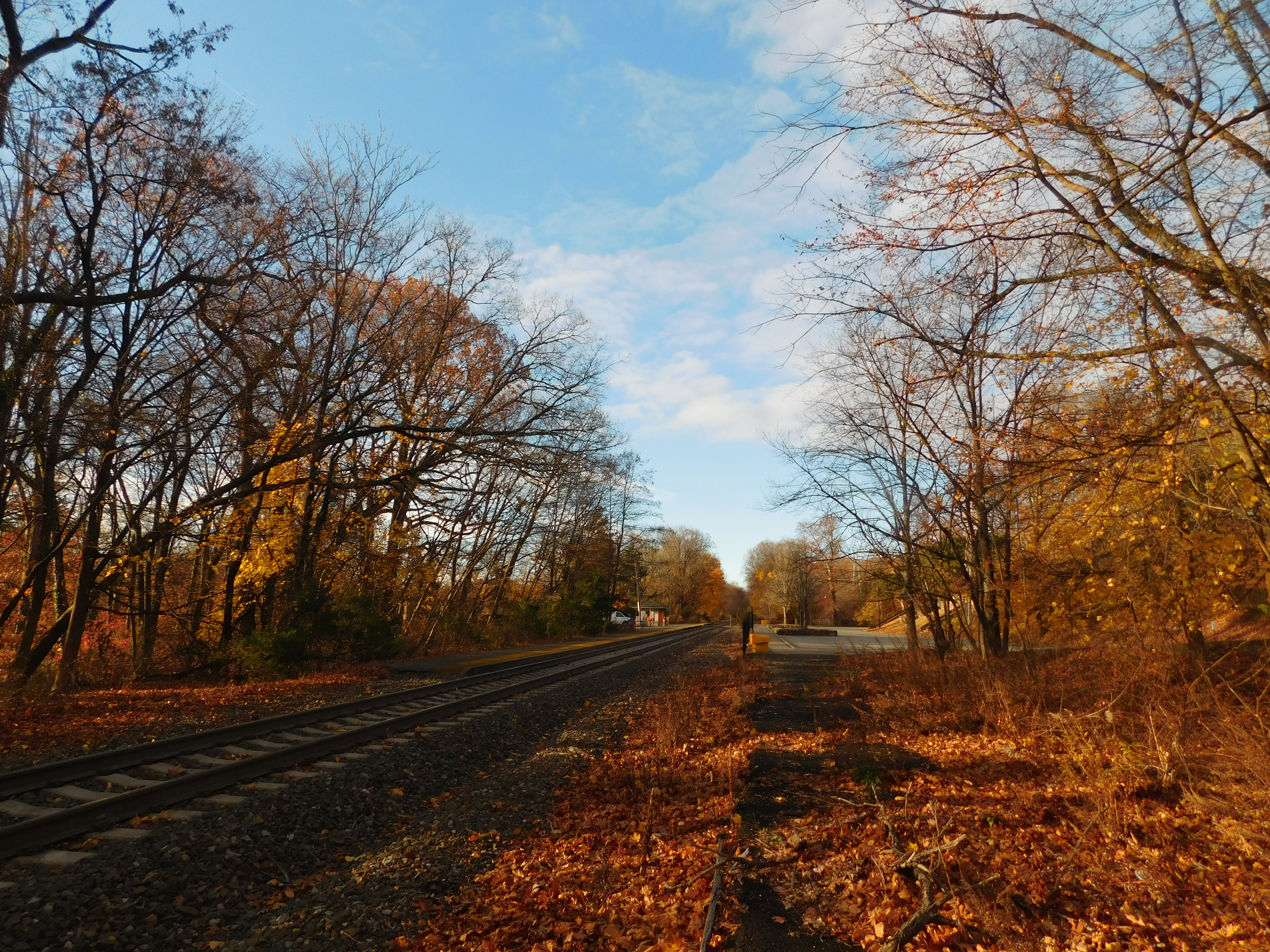
An abandoned platform on the north side of the Mountain Lakes station

Herbert Hapgood, a local entrepreneur who built the Shoreham section of Brookhaven, New York, opened an inn near the Boonton Branch tracks on Newark Turnpike near modern-day Crane Road. The location of this inn, called the Mountain lakes Inn, was to be in access of Fox Hill station. Hapgood decided to build a new community in Boonton Township, creating a company named Mountain Lakes, Incorporated. This was the land acquisition and ownership company, while Oak Ridge Company, a second corporation, would do the construction of the area, including new homes and new roads. With colleagues from the Shoreham construction, construction of roads in the area began in 1912.

In May 1912, construction began on a new railroad station in Boonton Township. This new station would cost $40,000 (equivalent to $1,300,000 in 2025). By the time of construction, Mountain Lakes had 130 homes already finished and occupied, with 20 more under construction. The new station would be a single-story stone structure with access to local roads. This new station was a proposal of Mountain Lakes, Incorporated and 75 local residents to replace the Fox Hill station on Newark Turnpike, and sat on the property once owned by Hero Bull. The depot was a creation of William Hull Botsford, an architect under the supervision of Frank J. Nies, the railroad's head architect. Belle de Rivera, a local suffragist, placed the cornerstone on the new depot.

In order to gain approval for the closure of the Fox Hill station, the New Jersey Board of Public Utilities required the state and railroad follow several requests in June 1912. The railroad would have to continue maintenance of the Fox Hill station under construction of Mountain Lakes' new depot would be complete. After said time, the railroad would have to maintain the freight services at Fox Hill. A new road would have to be built to reach the station from Newark Turnpike and that said road would have to be direct, following the railroad parallel. A new road would also have to be built to the roadway that ran between Parsippany to Boonton. The new station in Mountain lakes opened on November 10, 1912.

In October 1973, the state approved the Erie Lackawanna Railroad a $950,000 grant to lengthen the platform at Mountain Lakes station and other stations in Morris and Essex Counties. The Mountain Lakes project included building new waiting shelters and a pedestrian crosswalk.

The New Jersey State Historical Preservation Office added Mountain Lakes station to its Mountain Lakes Historic District, along with much of the borough in July 2005. The United States Department of the Interior added it to the National Register of Historic Places on September 7, 2005.

== Station layout and services ==
Mountain Lakes station consists of a single low-level side platform next to the station depot. This platform is accessed via a driveway from Midvale Road. At the top of the driveway is a thirteen-space parking lot, maintained by the borough of Mountain Lakes. The parking spaces are permit based and limited to three hours without a permit. The second lot has 59 spaces, and is north of the tracks between Midvale Road and Elm Road. The third and final lot is located on the west side of Midvale Road, which has 15 spaces. Mountain Lakes station has racks for bicycles on the platform and a ticket vending machine in the ornate station shelter.

The station does not have service on weekends except during holidays.

== See also ==
- Mountain Lakes Historic District

== Bibliography ==
- Lyon, Isaac S. (1873). Historical Discourse on Boonton, Delivered Before the Citizens of Boonton at Washington Hall, on the Evenings of September 21 and 28, and October 5, 1867. Newark, New Jersey: The Daily Journal Office.
- New Jersey State Board of Public Utility Commissioners (1913). Third Annual Report of the Board of Public Utility Commissioners for the State of New Jersey for the Year 1912. Union Hill, New Jersey: Dispatch Printing Company.
