= Operating Passenger Railroad Stations Thematic Resource =

- Operating Passenger Railroad Stations
- U.S. National Register of Historic Places
- New Jersey Register of Historic Places
- Location: New Jersey, U.S.
- Architectural style: various
- NRHP reference No.: 64000496
- NJRHP No.: 5080

Significant dates
- Added to NRHP: June 22, 1984 & September 29, 1984
- Designated NJRHP: March 17, 1984

The Operating Passenger Railroad Stations Thematic Resource is a list of 53 New Jersey Transit stations in New Jersey entered into the New Jersey Register of Historic Places and National Register of Historic Places in 1984 for their architectural, historical, and cultural merit.

== History ==
=== 19th century ===
Rail service began in New Jersey in 1834. Over the course of the next century, an expansive system operated by competing private companies crisscrossed the state, providing freight, long-distance and commuter passenger service.

=== 20th century ===
By the mid 1970s most were financially troubled. Amtrak began operations on May 1, 1971 after having taken over long-distance passenger service considered to be in the nation's best interest, including the Northeast Corridor in New Jersey. Statewide commuter services came under the auspices of the New Jersey Department of Transportation and were operated under contract by Conrail, which had been established in 1976.

New Jersey Transit Rail Operations (NJTRO) was established by 1983 when New Jersey Transit (NJT) took over operations.

New Jersey Transit, in conjunction with State Historic Preservation Office (SHPO), commissioned a field study concluded in 1981 of 112 train station buildings, or head houses, under its jurisdiction that had been built before World War II and were still in operation, which culminated in a report The Operating Railroad Stations of New Jersey: A Historical Survey. After a process of elimination over the next years the SHPO recommended that 53 stations be included in a multiple property submission (MPS) thematic nomination (TN); several had been previously designated, some as contributing properties to historic districts.

The NJRHP designation took place on March 17, 1984 (#5080). The MPS submission was made on May 8, 1984. Forty of the stations were entered into the NRHP on June 22, 1984 and the remainder were entered as part of the completed TN on September 29, 1984 (#64000496). Many stations were along former lines that had become part of NJTRO, one of which is used by SEPTA.

The oldest station building, the Long-a-Coming Depot, built in 1856, and the oldest active station building, Ramsey-Main Street Station, built in 1868, were not listed. Also not included in the TN were two significant individually-listed historic operating stations, Newark Pennsylvania Station and Hoboken Terminal, both of which are major rail hubs that also serve as terminals for light rail, PATH subway trains, and in the case of Hoboken, ferries across the Hudson River.

Another former intermodal station, the inactive Communipaw Terminal on the Upper New York Bay, had also been previously listed. There are other stations which have also been listed on the state and federal register, such as Mountain Lakes and Demarest which were not part of the TN since they were inactive at the time, were not considered sufficiently significant, or were not part of the NJT system.

== List ==
	Station	Service	Locale Municipality County	Former railroad service	Construction date of station house	Designation	Status
1	Ampere		East Orange; Essex	Lackawanna; Montclair Branch	1908	NJRHP#1073 March 1984; NRHP#84002628; June 22, 1984 (TR) delisted October 30, 1990	Inactive. Service discontinued April 7, 1991; Station building demolished 1991
2	Anderson Street	Pascack Valley Line	Hackensack; Bergen	Erie	1869	NJRHP#519 March 17, 1984 delisted March 30, 2011; NRHP #84002520 June 22, 1984 (TR) delisted May 2011	Active; Listed station building destroyed by fire 2009 and replaced
3	Bernardsville	Gladstone Branch	Bernardsville; Somerset	Lackawanna	1901	NJRHP#247 March 17, 1984; NRHP#84002786 June 22, 1984 (TR)	Active
4	Bloomfield	Montclair-Boonton Line	Bloomfield; Essex	Lackawanna	1912	NJRHP#1065 March 17, 1984; NRHP#84002631 June 22, 1984 (TR)	Active; Listed building privately owned
5	Boonton	Montclair-Boonton Line	Boonton; Morris	Lackawanna	1905	NJRHP#2089 October 19, 1976 NRHP#77000889 July 13, 1977; September 29, 1984 (TR)	Active
6	Bound Brook	Raritan Valley Line	Bound Brook; Somerset	Jersey Central	1913 replaced 1847 Elizabethtown & Somerville Railroad Depot	NJRHP#2481 March 17, 1984; NRHP#84002787 June 22, 1984 (TR)	Active station. Station house (1913) converted to restaurant
7	Bradley Beach	North Jersey Coast Line	Bradley Beach; Monmouth	Jersey Central	1912	NJRHP#1963 March 17, 1984; NRHP#84002749 (TR)	Active
8	Brick Church	Morristown Line; Gladstone Branch	East Orange; Essex	Lackawanna	1923 replaced former 1878 Depot	NJRHP#1074 March 17, 194; NRHP#840032 636 June 22, 1984 (TR)	Active
9	Dover	Morristown Line; Montclair-Boonton Line	Dover; Morris	Lackawanna	1902 replaced 1848 M&E station	NJRHP#2109 February 1, 1980; NRHP:80002511 May 23, 1980; September 29, 1984 (TR)	Active
10	East Orange	Morristown Line; Gladstone Branch	East Orange; Essex	Lackawanna	1923 replaced original 1836 depot	NJRHP: # NRHP:84002638 June 22, 1984 (TR)	Active
11	Elberon	North Jersey Coast Line	Elberon; Long Branch; Monmouth	Jersey Central	1899	NJRHP#2007 December 19, 1977; NRHP#78001777 June 9, 1978; September 29, 1984 (TR) delisted October 17 & October 30, 1990	Active; Listed station building lost to fire and replaced
12	Elizabeth Station		Elizabeth; Union	Jersey Central; Mainline	1863	NJRHP#2661 March 17, 1984; NRHP#84002825 September 29, 1984 (TR)	Inactive, 1976 but included in nomination Adjacent to former PRR station Elizabeth (NJT station) (NEC); Proposed incorporation into Elizabeth Midtown Station
13	Fanwood	Raritan Valley Line	Fanwood; Union	Jersey Central	1874	NJRHP#2680# November 7, 1979; NRHP#80002521 July 17, 1980; September 29, 1984 (TR)	Active
14	Far Hills	Gladstone Branch	Far Hills; Somerset	Lackawanna	1914	NJRHP#2489 March 17, 1984; NRHP#84002789 June 22, 1984 (TR)	Active
15	Gladstone	Gladstone Branch	Gladstone; Somerset	Lackawanna	1891	NJRHP#2577 March 17, 1984; NRHP#84002792 June 22, 1984 (TR)	Active
16	Glen Ridge (Montclair Branch)	Montclair-Boonton Line	Glen Ridge; Essex	Lackawanna	1912	Glen Ridge Historic District (CP); NJRHP #1087 October 3, 1980; NRHP #82004784 August 9, 1982; NJRH: #3712 March 17, 1984; NRHP: June 22, 1984 (TR)	Active
17	Glen Ridge (Boonton Line)		Glen Ridge; Essex	Erie; NYGL; Boonton Line NJT	1883	Glen Ridge Historic District (CP); NJRHP #1087 October 3, 1980; NRHP #82004784 August 9, 1982; NJRHP: #4075 March 17, 1984; NRHP: September 29, 1984 (TR)	Renamed Benson Street by NJT; Inactive since 2002; Listed station building sold by NJT and converted to private home
18	Hillsdale	Pascack Valley Line	Hillsdale; Bergen	Erie	1869	NJRHP#537 March 17, 1984; NRHP#84002566 June 22, 9184 (TR)	Active
19	Hopewell		Hopewell; Mercer	Reading	1876 former D&BB station closed in 1982	NJRHP: #1673 March 17, 1984; NRHP: #84002728 June 22, 1984 (TR)	Inactive; Proposed station on West Trenton Line (NJ Transit)
20	Little Silver	North Jersey Coast Line	Little Silver; Monmouth	Jersey Central	1890	NJRHP#1999 March 17, 1984; NRHP#84002754 June 22, 1984 (TR)	Active
21	Lyons	Gladstone Branch	Liberty Corner; Somerset	Lackawanna	1931	NJRHP#2477 March 17, 1984; NRHP#84002805 June 22, 1984 (TR)	Active
22	Madison	Morristown Line	Madison; Morris	Lackawanna	1916	NJRHP#2141 March 17, 1984; NRHP 84002764 June 22, 1984 (TR)	Active
23	Matawan	North Jersey Coast Line	Matawan	Monmouth	Jersey Central	NJRHP#2017 March 17, 1984; NRHP#84002756 June 22, 1987 (TR)	Active; Renamed Aberdeen-Matawan by NJT; Listed building not in use since 1982
24	Millington	Gladstone Branch	Millington; Long Hill Township; Morris	Lackawanna	1901 replaced early-1870s-built M&E Depot	NJRHP#2138 March 17, 1984; NRHP#84002767 June 22, 1984	Active
25	Montclair Lackawanna Terminal		Montclair; Essex	Lackawanna; Montclair Branch	1913	NJRHP#1155 August 7, 1972; NRHP#73001092 January 8, 1973; September 29, 1984 (TR)	Inactive since 1981; converted to shopping center
26	Morris Plains	Morristown Line	Morris Plains; Morris	Lackawanna	1915	NJRHP#2170 March 17, 1984; NRHP#84002780 June 22, 1984 (TR)	Active
27	Morristown	Morristown Line; Morristown	Morris	Lackawanna	1913	NJRHP#2186 October 16, 1979; NRHP#84003514 March 11, 1908; September 29, 1984 (TR)	Active
28	Mountain Avenue	Montclair-Boonton Line	Montclair; Essex	Erie	1893 replaced former 1873-built Montclair Railway Depot	NJRHP#1160 March 17, 1984; NRHP#84002654 June 22, 1984 (TR)	Active
29	Mountain Station	Morristown Line; Gladstone Branch	South Orange; Essex	Lackawanna	1914	NJRHP#1361 March 17, 1984; NRHP#84002656 September 29, 1984 (TR)	Active
30	Murray Hill	Gladstone Branch	Murray Hill; New Providence; Union	Lackawanna	1891	NJRH#2692 March 17, 1984; NRHP#84002826 June 22, 1984 (TR)	Active
31	Netherwood	Raritan Valley Line	Plainfield; Union	Jersey Central	1894	NJRHP#2700 March 17, 1984; NRHP#84002830 June 22, 1984 (TR)	Active
32	New Brunswick	Northeast Corridor Line	New Brunswick; Middlesex	Pennsylvania	1903	NJRH#1875 March 17, 1984; NRHP#84002732 June 22, 1984 (TR)	Active; serves NJT and Amtrak
33	Newark Broad Street Station	Montclair-Boonton Line; Morristown Line; Gladstone Branch	Newark; Essex	Lackawanna	1903 replaced 1836-built M&E Depot	NJRHP#1217 March 17, 1984; NRHP#84002662 June 22, 1984 (TR)	Active; Terminus Newark Light Rail branch since 2006
34	Ocean City Tenth Street Station	Ocean City Transportation Center	Ocean City; Cape May	Atlantic City Railroad; Pennsylvania-Reading Seashore Lines	1898	NJRHP#1010 March 17, 1984; NRHP84002611 June 22, 1984	Service discontinued 1981; Active as bus terminal
35	Ocean City 34th Street Station		Ocean City; Cape May	Atlantic City Railroad; Pennsylvania-Reading Seashore Lines	circa 1885	NJRHP#1011 March 17, 1984; NRHP#84002613 June 22, 1984	Service discontinued 1981; Listed station building struck by truck and later demolished
36	Oradell	Pascack Valley Line	Oradell; Bergen	Erie	1891	NJRHP#612 March 17, 1984; NRHP#84002575 June 22, 1984	Active
37	Orange	Morristown Line; Gladstone Branch	Orange; Essex	Lackawanna	1918	NJRHP#1335 March 17, 1984; NRHP#84002665 June 22, 1984 (TR)	Active
38	Park Ridge	Pascack Valley Line	Park Ridge; Bergen	Erie	1872	NJRHP#627 March 17, 1984; NRHP#84002577 June 22, 1984 (TR)	Active
39	Perth Amboy	North Jersey Coast Line	Perth Amboy; Middlesex	Jersey Central	1923	NJRHP#1899 March 17, 1984; NRHP#84002735 June 22, 1984 (TR)	Active
40	Plainfield	Raritan Valley Line	Plainfield; Union	Jersey Central	1902	NJRHP#2791 March 17, 1984; NRHP#84002837 June 22, 1984 (TR)	Active
41	Princeton		Princeton; Mercer	Pennsylvania	1918 replaced 1865-built UNJ&C Depot	NJRHP#1742 March 17, 1984; NRHP September 29, 1984 (TR)	Inactive; New station house opened 2014 on shortened Princeton Branch
42	Radburn	Bergen County Line	Radburn; Fairlawn; Bergen	Erie	1930	NJRHP#483 March 17, 1984; NRHP#84002580 June 22, 1984 (TR)	Active
43	Raritan	Raritan Valley Line	Raritan; Somerset	Jersey Central	1890	NJRHP#2579 March 17, 1984; NRHP#84002824 June 22, 1984 (TR)	Active
44	Red Bank	North Jersey Coast Line	Red Bank; Monmouth	Jersey Central	1876	NJRNP#2048 January 7, 1976; NRHP#76001172 May 28, 1976; September 29, 1984 (TR)	Active
45	Ridgewood	Main Line; Bergen County Line	Ridgewood; Bergen	Erie	1916	NJRHP#647 March 17, 1984; NRHP#84002582 June 22, 1984 (TR)	Active
46	Rutherford	Bergen County Line	Rutherford; Bergen	Erie	1898 replaced an 1862-built NY&E Depot	NJRHP#667 March 17, 1984; NRHP#84002584 June 22, 1984 (TR)	Active
47	South Orange	Morristown Line; Gladstone Branch	South Orange; Essex	Lackawanna	1915	NJRHP#1362 March 17, 1984; NRHP#84002669 June 22, 1984 (TR)	Active
48	Tuckahoe		Upper Township; Cape May	Atlantic City Railroad; Philadelphia and Reading Railway; Pennsylvania-Reading Seashore Lines	1894–95; 1906	NJRHP#1016 March 17, 1984; NRHP#84002626 June 22, 1984 (TR)	Inactive; Cape May Seashore Lines; Seasonal excursion train suspended 2012
49	Upper Montclair	Montclair-Boonton Line	Upper Montclair; Montclair; Essex	Erie	1892 replaced 1873-built Montclair Railway station	NJRHP#1191 March 17, 1984; NRHP#84002673 June 22, 1984 (TR)	Active
50	Waldwick	Main Line; Bergen County Line	Waldwick; Bergen	Erie	1886	NJRHP#716 August 27, 1977; NRHP#78001742 August 27, 1977; September 29, 1984 (TR)	Active; Listed station building not in use by NJT leased to historical society since 2009
51	Watchung Avenue	Montclair-Boonton Line	Montclair; Essex	Erie	1904 replaced 1873-built Montclair Railway station	NJRHP#1198 March 17, 1984; NRHP#84002674 June 22, 1984 (TR)	Active
52	West Trenton	West Trenton Line (SEPTA)	West Trenton; Ewing; Mercer	Reading	1929	NJRHP#1650 March 17, 1984; NRHP#84004031 June 22, 1984 (TR)	Active; Proposed station on West Trenton Line (NJ Transit)
53	White House	Raritan Valley Line	Whitehouse Station; Readington Township; Hunterdon	Jersey Central; Rockaway Valley Railroad	1892	NJRHP#1628 March 17, 1984; NRHP#84002726 June 22, 1984 (TR)	Active

== Other historic designations ==
Among the other stations in the state, most of which of are inactive, listed in the state and federal registers are Allenhurst (NJT) (station building demolished), Butler (NYSW), Cary (CNJ), Demarest (Erie Northern Branch), Great Meadows (L&HR), Long-a-Coming Depot, Maywood (NYSW), Mountain Lakes, North Pemberton (C&A), Pennington (Reading), Pompton Plains (Erie), Rio Grande (WJ), Tenafly (Erie Northern Branch), and Washington (DL&W) (demolished).

== Abbreviations ==
- C&A=Camden and Amboy
- CNJ=Central Railroad of New Jersey
- CP=contributing property
- DL&W=Delaware, Lackawanna and Western Railroad
- Erie=Erie Railroad
- L&HR=Lehigh and Hudson River Railway
- M&E=Morris and Essex Railroad
- N&E=New York and Erie Railroad
- NEC=Northeast Corridor
- NYGL=New York and Greenwood Lake Railway
- NRHP=National Register of Historic Places
- NJDOT=New Jersey Department of Transportation
- NJRHP=New Jersey Register of Historic Places
- NJT=NJ Transit
- NYS&W=New York, Susquehanna and Western Railway
- NS=Norfolk Southern Railway
- PATH=PATH rail system
- PRR=Pennsylvania Railroad
- PS=Public service railway
- SEPTA=Southeastern Pennsylvania Transportation Authority
- SHPO=State Historic Preservation Office
- TN=thematic nomination
- TR=thematic resource
- WJ=West Jersey and Seashore Railroad

== See also ==
- Erie Railroad Signal Tower, Waldwick Yard
- Garfield Tea House
- Bradford Gilbert, designed many notable registered stations
- Frank J. Nies, architect who designed many notable registered stations
- List of companies transferred to Conrail
- List of New Jersey Transit stations
- List of the oldest buildings in New Jersey
- Morristown and Erie Railroad Whippany Water Tank
- National Register of Historic Places listings in New Jersey
- Philadelphia and Reading Railroad Freight Station
- Raritan River Freight Station
