= Glen Ridge Historic District =

Historic district in New Jersey, United States

- U.S. National Register of Historic Places
- U.S. Historic district
- New Jersey Register of Historic Places
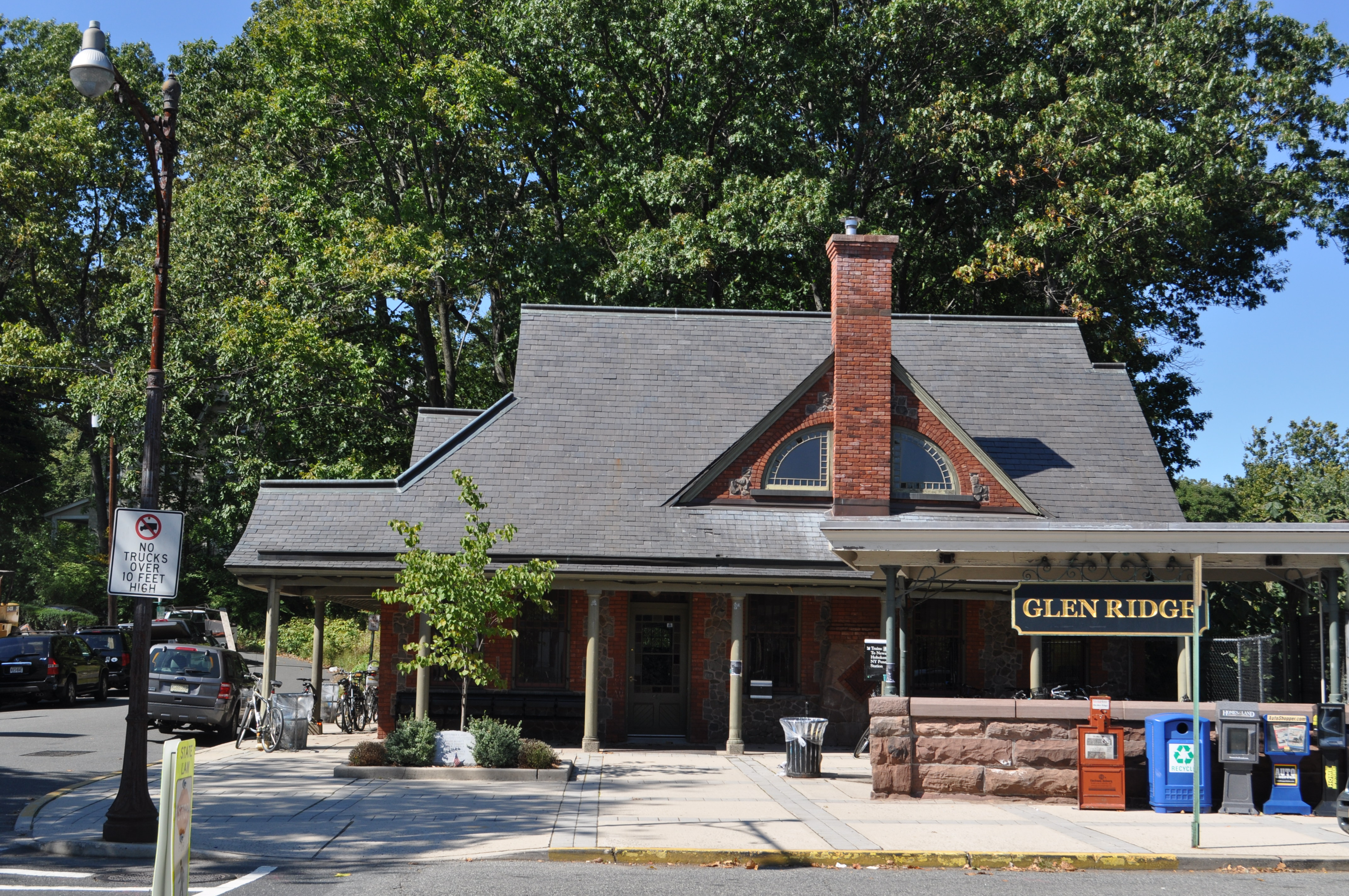
- Glen Ridge Station

- Location within Essex County, New Jersey Location within New Jersey Location within the United States
- Coordinates: 40°47′52″N 74°12′19″W
- NRHP reference No.: 82004784 (original); 88002155 (increase 1); 13000480 (increase 2)
- NJRHP No.: 1087 (original); 1088 (increase 1); 5259 (increase 2)

Significant dates
- Added to NRHP: August 9, 1982
- Boundary increases: November 14, 1988; July 9, 2013
- Designated NJRHP: October 3, 1980 (original); February 8, 1988 (increase 1); March 20, 2013 (increase 2)

The Glen Ridge Historic District is a historic district in Glen Ridge in Essex County, New Jersey, United States, originally listed in the New Jersey Register of Historic Places (NJRHP) in 1980 and the National Register of Historic Places (NRHP) in 1982 and later expanded in two boundary increases. It includes the Glen Ridge and the Benson Street train stations.

== Listings ==
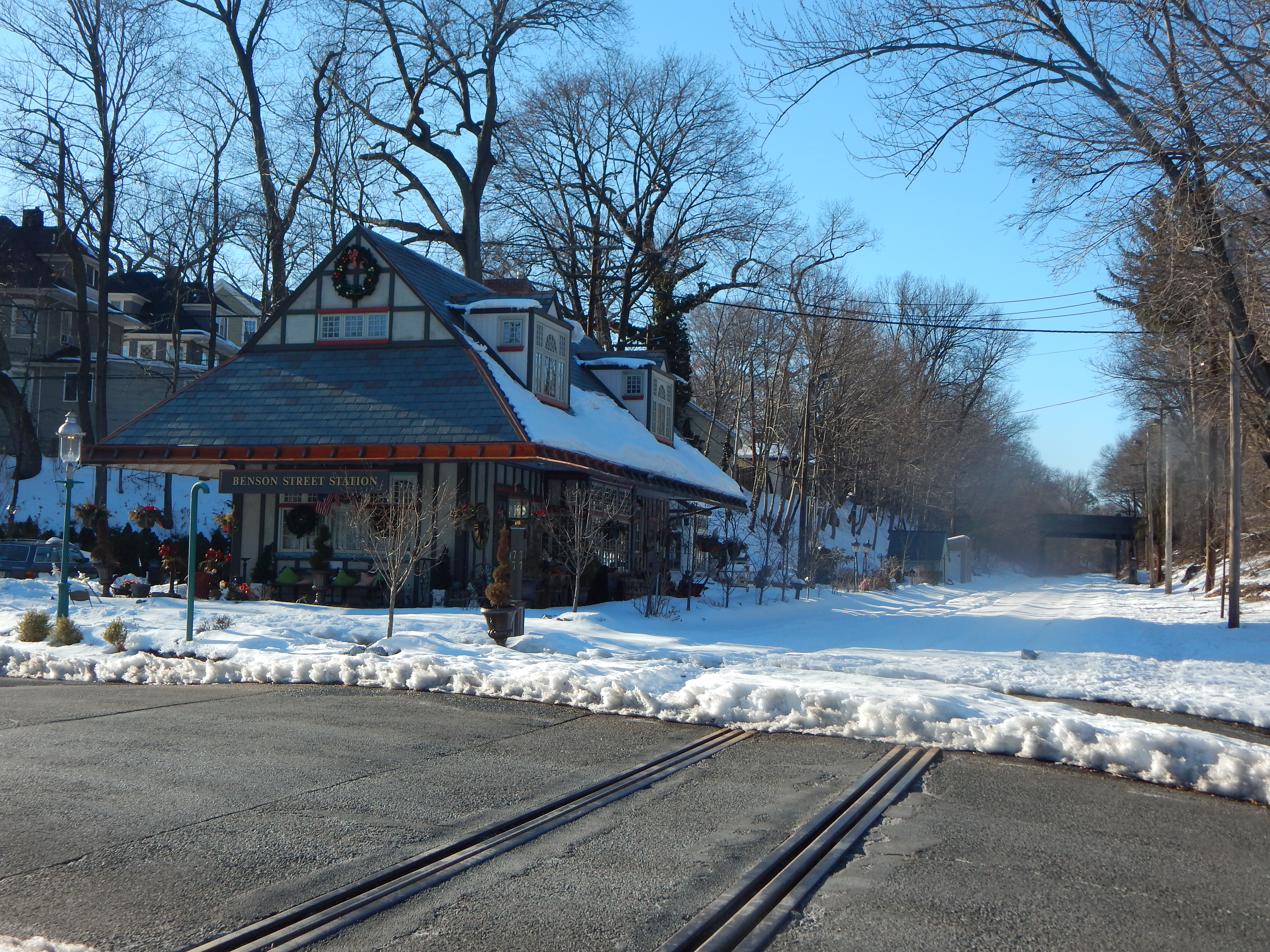
Benson Street Station

=== Original ===
The first listing in the NJRHP on October 3, 1980 (#1087) and in the National Register of Historic Places (NRHP) on August 9, 1982 (#82004784) included parts Ridgewood, Bloomfield, Midland, Maolis, Linden, Hawthorne, Hillside, Park, Essex, Bay, Woodland, Glen Ridge, Highland, Belleville, Sherman and Forest Avenues; Baldwin, Bay, Argyle, Herman, Washington, Lincoln, Summit, Clark, High, Thomas, Benson, & Osborne Streets; Clinton, Edgewood, Appleton, Douglas, Hamilton, Hillcrest, & Old Oak Roads; Astor, Chestnut Hill, Windsor, Appleton, Snowden, Darwin, Hathaway, Laurel, Marston, Outlook, & Washington Place; Mead and Wildwood Terraces; Wells, Rudd.

=== Boundary increase ===
The first boundary increase was added to the NJRHP (#1088) on February 8, 1988, and to the NRHP (#88002155) on November 11, 1988, and includes parts of Bay, Columbus, Forest, Hawthorne, Linden, Midland, Ridgewood & Sherman Avenues Glen Ridge Parkway; Adams, Avon, Chapman, Inness, Mitchell, & Stanford Places; Ardsley, Cambridge, Spencer, & Tuxedo roads; Carteret, Dodd, Lorraine, Madison, Oxford, Steeple, and Washington Streets; Ferncliff and Roswell Terraces.

=== Boundary increase #2 ===
The second boundary increase, added to the NJRHP (#5259) on March 20, 2013 and to the NRHP (#13000480), radiates to the north and south of Ridgewood Avenue.

== See also ==
- National Register of Historic Places listings in Essex County, New Jersey
- Operating Passenger Railroad Stations Thematic Resource (New Jersey)
