= Morris Plains station =

NJ Transit rail station

Morris Plains
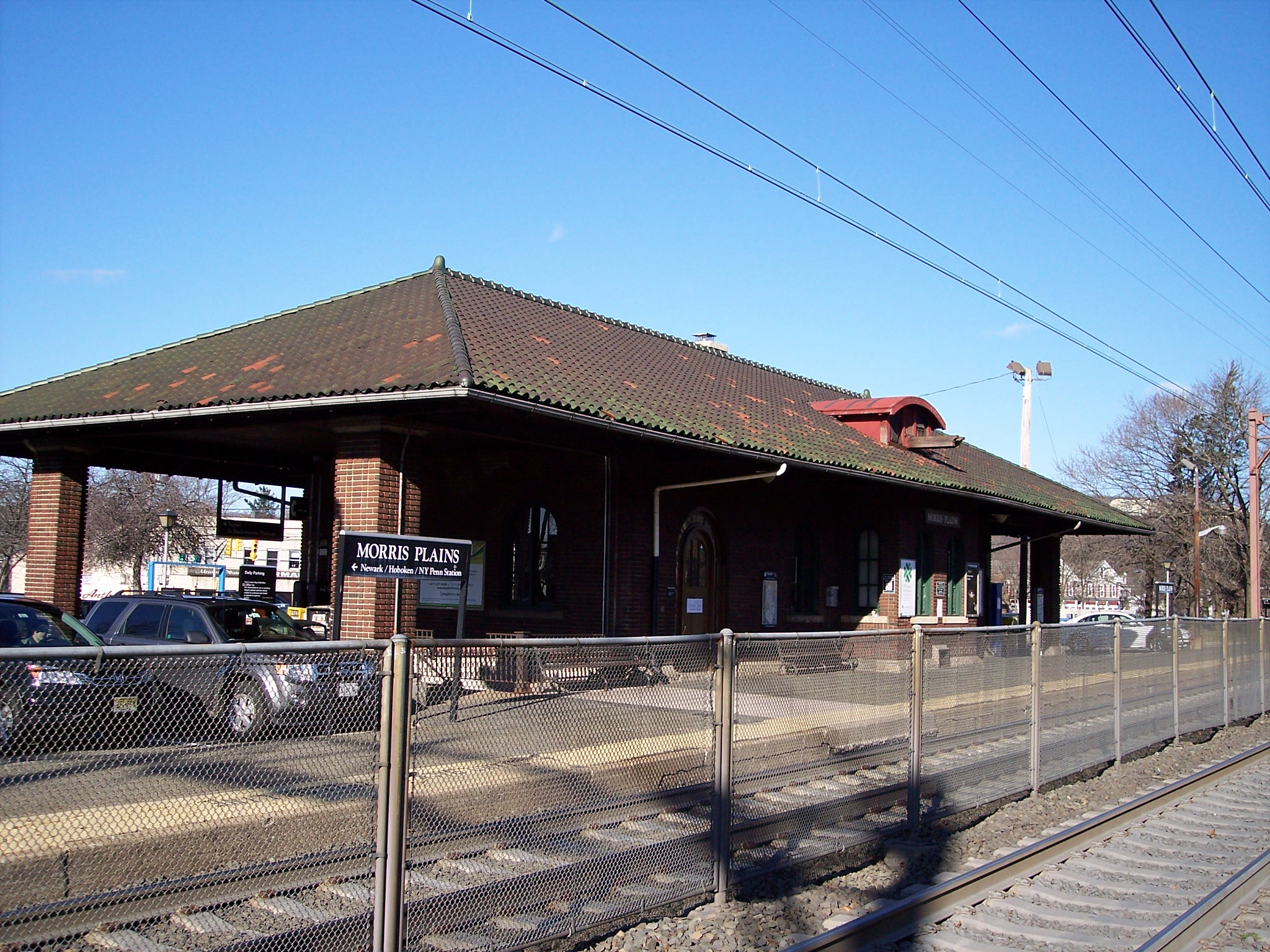

General information
- Location: 673 Speedwell Avenue, Morris Plains, New Jersey
- Lines: NJT Bus: 872, 875, 880
- Platforms: 2 side platforms
- Tracks: 2

Other information
- Station code: 432 (Delaware, Lackawanna and Western)
- Fare zone: 16

History
- Opened: July 4, 1848
- Rebuilt: 1915
- Electrified: January 22, 1931

Passengers
- 2025: 442 (average weekday)
- Rank: 65 of 153

Services
Preceding station	NJ Transit	Following station
Mount Tabor toward Hackettstown	Morristown Line	Morristown toward New York or Hoboken
Former services
Preceding station	Delaware, Lackawanna and Western Railroad	Following station
Mount Tabor toward Buffalo	Main Line	Morristown toward Hoboken
- Morris Plains Station
- U.S. National Register of Historic Places
- Location within Morris County, New Jersey Location within New Jersey Location within the United States
- Coordinates: 40°49′43″N 74°28′42″W
- Area: 1.5 acres (0.6 ha)
- Built: 1915
- Architect: Nies, Frank J.
- Architectural style: Renaissance
- MPS: Operating Passenger Railroad Stations TR
- NRHP reference No.: 84002780
- Added to NRHP: June 22, 1984
Location

Morris Plains Station is a NJ Transit station in Morris Plains, in Morris County, New Jersey, United States, along the Morristown Line at Route 202 (Speedwell Avenue/Littleton Road) in downtown Morris Plains.

The former Lackawanna station was built in 1915 and has a brick station house. It was designed by architect Frank J. Nies who built other stations for the Delaware, Lackawanna and Western Railroad. Unlike most of his stations which tended to resemble massive cathedrals, Morris Plains station was built as a simple one-story structure, which also contains a unique Spanish tile roof. An old train station just to the north now serves as The Morris Plains Model Railroad Club. The station was added to the National Register of Historic Places on June 22, 1984, along with over 100 other stations within the state as part of the Operating Passenger Railroad Stations Thematic Resource.

== Station layout ==
The station has two tracks, each with a low-level side platform.

== See also ==
- National Register of Historic Places listings in Morris County, New Jersey

== Bibliography ==
- Platt, Charles Davis (1922). Dover Dates, 1722-1922: A Bicentennial History of Dover, New Jersey, Published in Connection with Dover's Two Hundredth Anniversary Celebration Under the Direction of the Dover Fire Department, August 9, 10, 11, 1922. Dover, New Jersey: Charles Davis Platt.
