= Mount Tabor station =

NJ Transit rail station

Mount Tabor
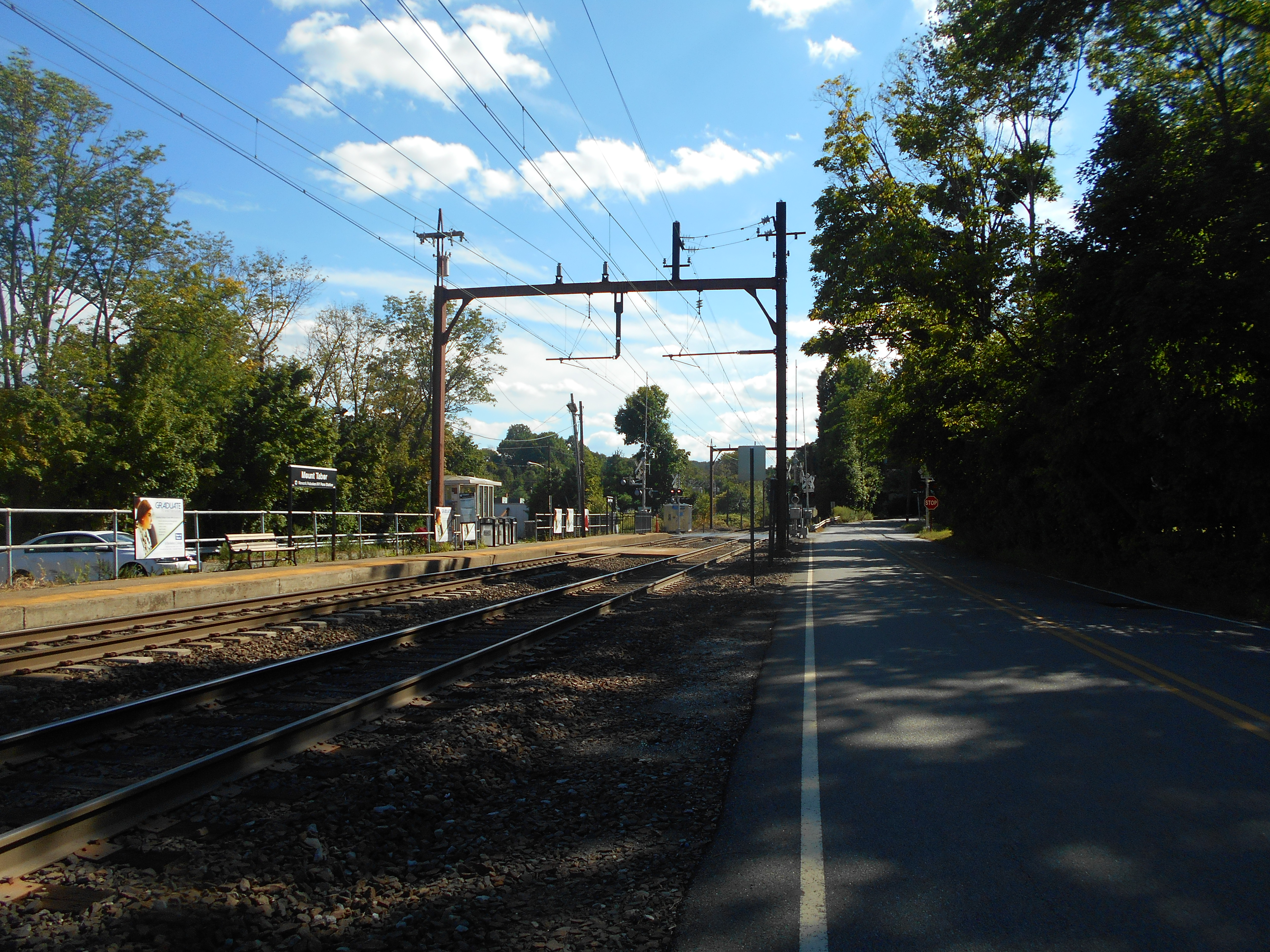
- Mount Tabor station in September 2014 facing Morris Plains-bound. Station Road is visible to the right side.

General information
- Location: Station Road near Route 53; Mount Tabor, New Jersey
- Coordinates: 40°52′33″N 74°28′55″W
- Owner: New Jersey Transit
- Platforms: 1 side platform
- Tracks: 2
- Connections: NJT Bus: 880

Construction
- Parking: Yes
- Cycle facilities: Yes

Other information
- Station code: 436 (Delaware, Lackawanna and Western)
- Fare zone: 16

History
- Opened: 1881
- Rebuilt: May 1, 1902
- Electrified: January 22, 1931

Key dates
- June 15, 1971: Station depot razed

Passengers
- 2024: 11 (average weekday)

Services
Preceding station	NJ Transit	Following station
Denville toward Hackettstown	Morristown Line limited service	Morris Plains toward New York or Hoboken
Former services
Preceding station	Delaware, Lackawanna and Western Railroad	Following station
Denville toward Buffalo	Main Line	Morris Plains toward Hoboken
Location

Mount Tabor is a New Jersey Transit station in Denville, New Jersey along the Morristown Line just west of the small community of Mount Tabor in Parsippany-Troy Hills, New Jersey. The station consists of one small side platform and 48 parking spaces for commuters. One of these parking spaces is handicapped-accessible.

== History ==
The first station at Mount Tabor was originally built by the Delaware, Lackawanna and Western Railroad on August 19, 1881 under the supervision of a man from Newark named John Scannell. The station depot was razed on June 15, 1971 after falling into a state of disrepair.

== Station layout ==
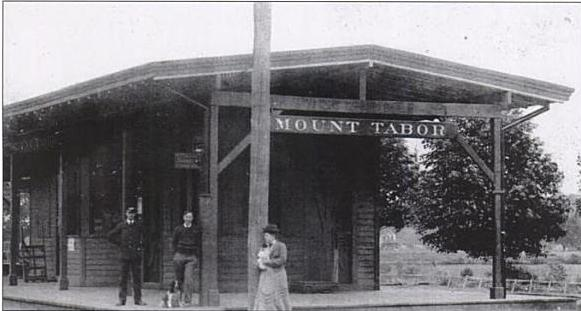
The original Mount Tabor DL&W station in 1881.

The station has two tracks with a low-level side platform on Track 1. Access from the platform to Track 2 is provided via a walkway over the tracks, though not all trains stop at this station.
