= Boonton station =

NJ Transit rail station

Boonton
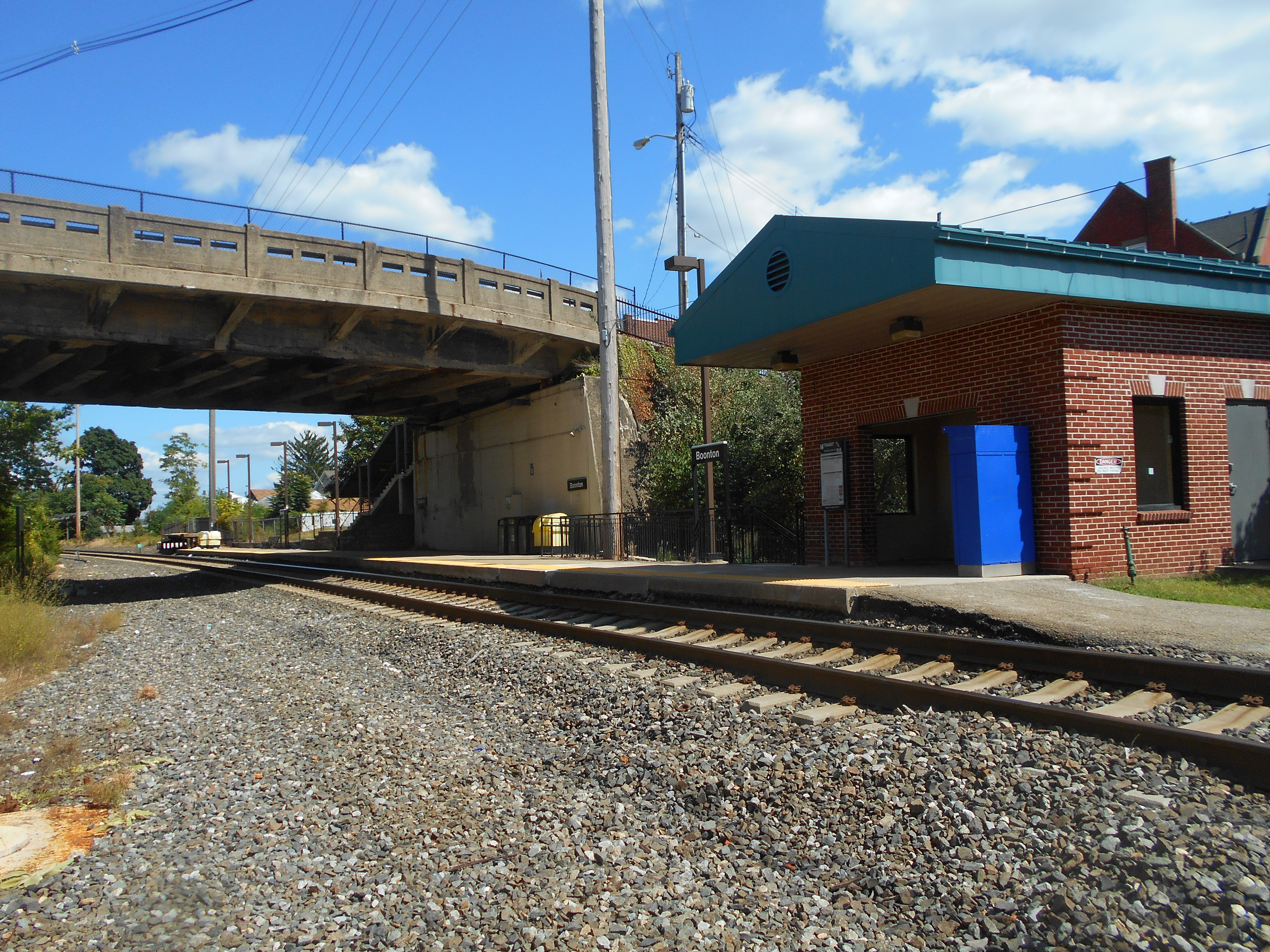
- The New Jersey Transit platform for Boonton in September 2014. Main Street is on the bridge above the station.

General information
- Location: Main Street (CR 511) and Myrtle Avenue (US 202), Boonton, New Jersey 07005
- Owner: NJ Transit
- Platforms: 1 side platform
- Tracks: 1
- Connections: NJ Transit Bus: 871; Lakeland Bus Lines: 46

Construction
- Parking: Yes
- Cycle facilities: Yes
- Accessible: Yes

Other information
- Station code: 29 (Delaware, Lackawanna and Western)
- Fare zone: 14

History
- Opened: September 5, 1867
- Rebuilt: June 1904–June 1, 1905

Passengers
- 2025: 37 (average weekday)
- Rank: 145 of 153

Services
Preceding station	NJ Transit	Following station
Mountain Lakes toward Hackettstown	Montclair–Boonton Line limited service	Towaco toward New York or Hoboken
Former services
Preceding station	Delaware, Lackawanna and Western Railroad	Following station
Mountain Lakes toward Dover	Boonton Branch	Montville toward Hoboken
- Delaware, Lackawanna and Western Railroad Station
- U.S. National Register of Historic Places
- New Jersey Register of Historic Places
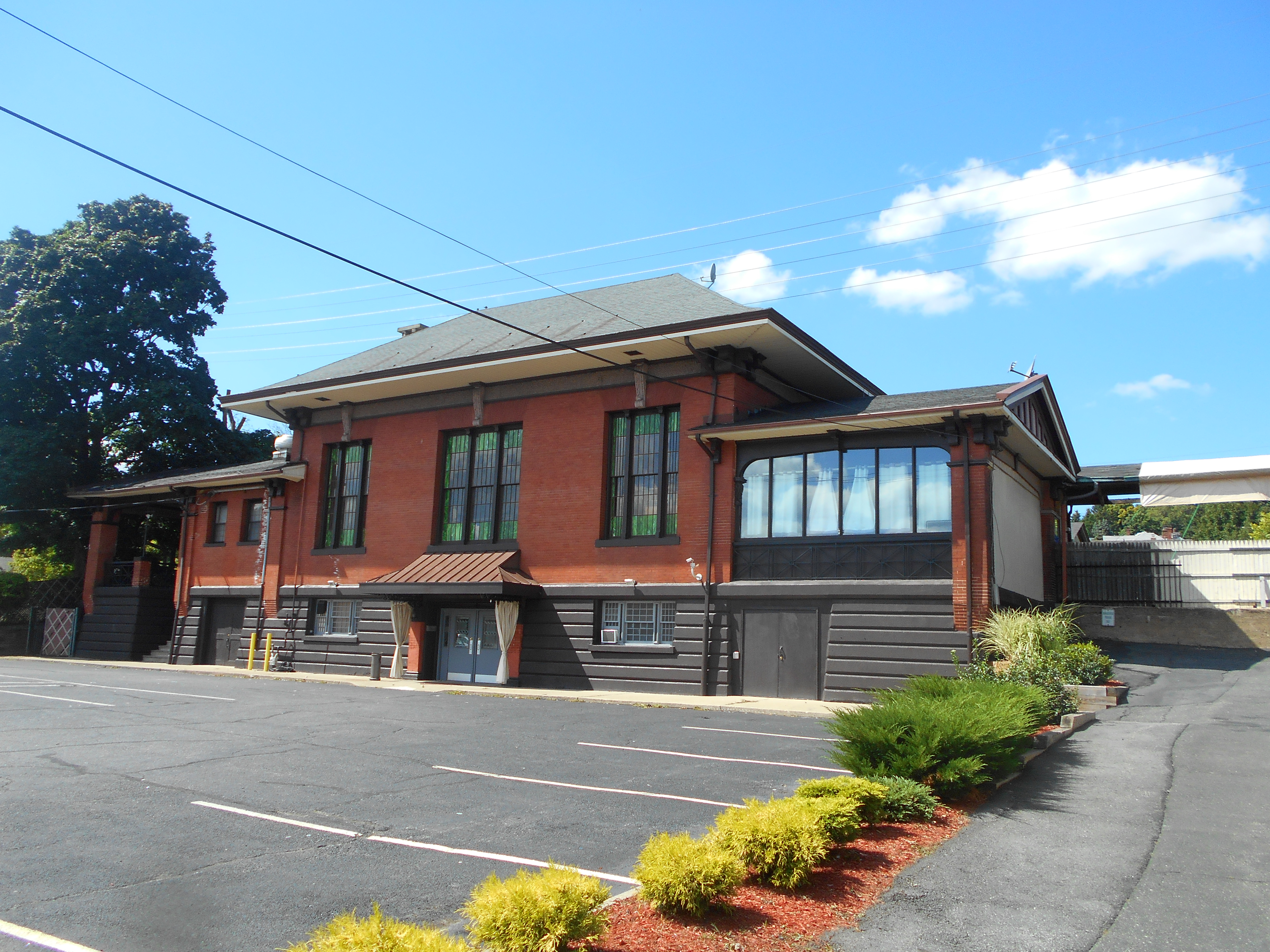
- The former Lackawanna Railroad depot in September 2014.
- Location: Myrtle Ave., Main, and Division Sts., Boonton, NJ
- Coordinates: 40°54′14″N 74°24′23″W
- Area: 2.5 acres (1 ha)
- Built: 1904
- Architect: Frank J. Nies
- Engineer: L. Bush
- Architectural style: Prairie School
- MPS: Operating Passenger Railroad Stations TR
- NRHP reference No.: 77000889
- NJRHP No.: 2087

Significant dates
- Added to NRHP: July 13, 1977
- Designated NJRHP: October 19, 1976
Location

Boonton is a NJ Transit station in Boonton, Morris County, New Jersey, United States along the Montclair–Boonton Line. It is located on Main Street (County Route 511), near Myrtle Avenue (U.S. Route 202) and I-287. The original 1905 station was built by architect Frank J. Nies who built other stations for the Delaware, Lackawanna and Western Railroad. Unlike most of his stations which tended to be massive Renaissance structures, Boonton station was built as a simple Prairie House design. The station house is now a bar, and was added to the National Register of Historic Places on July 13, 1977, two years before the establishment of New Jersey Transit and six years before becoming part of their railroad division.

== History ==
The construction of the Boonton Branch began on February 22, 1866 at a groundbreaking on the Denville section of Rockaway Township. This would be a new branch of tracks between Ketchams Switch and Boonton. The very first passenger train to Boonton came on September 5, 1867, going to New York City at 6:45 a.m. The first freight train was two weeks later, a coal train to a local mill. Boonton was the location of several iron mills and freight trains often brought supplies to the mills. The new branch was a creation of J.C. Lord, a partial owner of the Boonton Works and a director for the Morris and Essex Railroad.

In 1869, the Delaware, Lackawanna and Western Railroad began construction of the Boonton, Paterson and New York Branch, which would extend the Boonton Branch to the Hudson River via Paterson, providing a new branch shorter than the nearby Erie Railroad. The extension would also add a second track to the branch and offer more freight service. By August 1869, the construction in Boonton had been completed, including the tough section of the tidewaters, along with 1 mile (1.6 km) south of that section. Extension of coal train service in September 1870 and passenger service began on December 14, 1870.

== Station layout and services ==
Boonton station contains a single low-level side platform, located under the bridge of Main Street (County Route 511). The station contains a single brick shelter, which contains the single ticket vending machine. Bicycle racks are located on the platform behind the brick shelter. Boonton station contains a single parking lot, which contains 58 spaces, three of which are accessible for handicapped persons. The town of Boonton maintains the lot, which is paid parking until 7:00 p.m. Monday–Saturday.

The station does not have service on weekends except during holidays. Bus connections are available to NJ Transit's 871 service and Lakeland Bus Lines's 46 service.

== See also ==
- Operating Passenger Railroad Stations Thematic Resource (New Jersey)
- National Register of Historic Places listings in Morris County, New Jersey

== Bibliography ==
- Halsey, Edmund Drake (1882). History of Morris County, New Jersey With Illustrations and Biographical Sketches of Prominent Citizens and Pioneers. New York, New York: W.W. Munsell & Company.
- Lyon, Isaac S. (1873). Historical Discourse on Boonton, Delivered Before the Citizens of Boonton at Washington Hall, on the Evenings of September 21 and 28, and October 5, 1867. Newark, New Jersey: The Daily Journal Office.
