= Frank J. Nies =

American architect

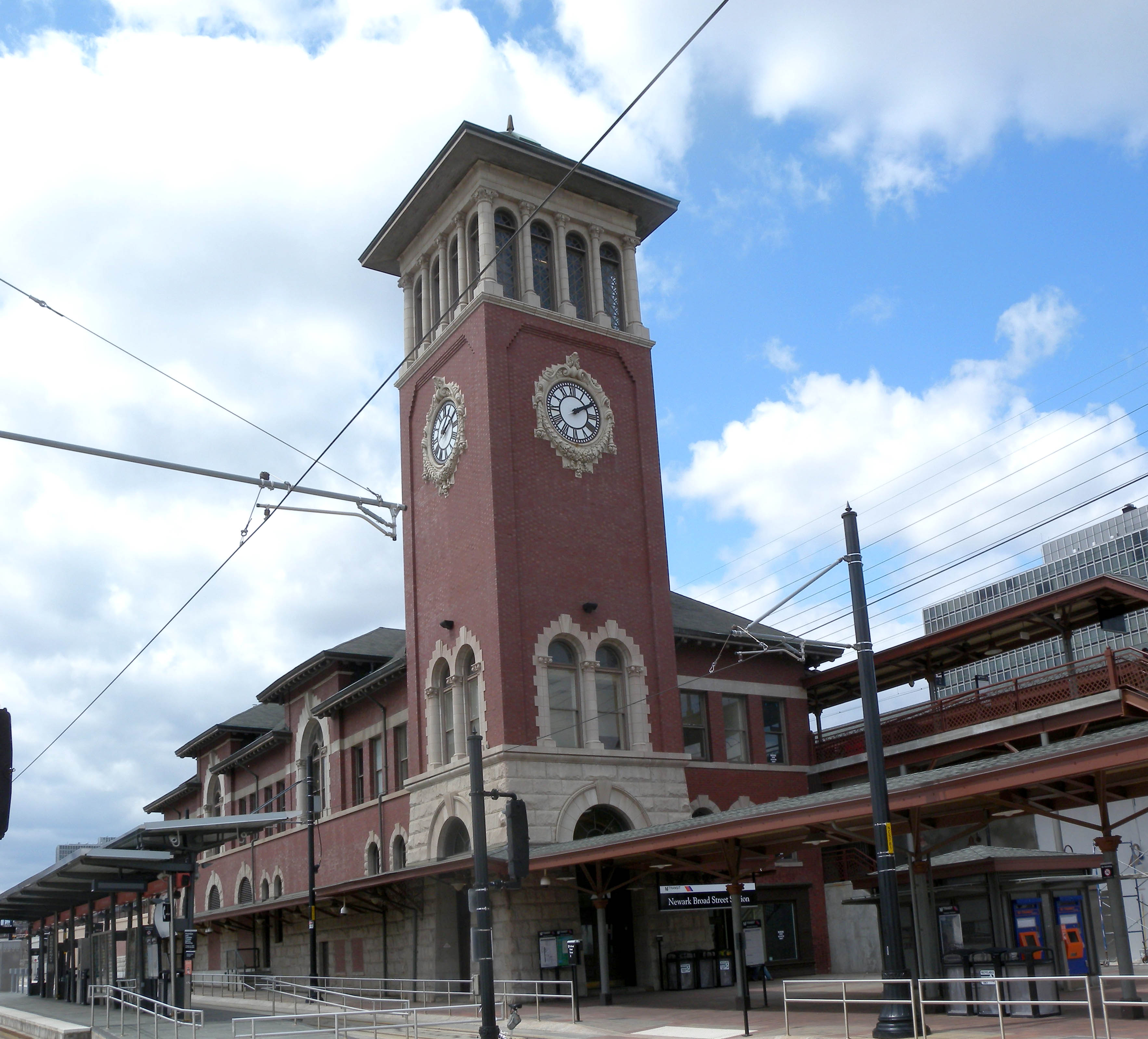
Newark Broad Street Station, built 1901-03

Frank J. Nies was an American architect best known for having designed numerous Delaware, Lackawanna and Western Railroad stations, at least fifteen of which have been listed on the U.S. National Register of Historic Places (with attribution below as given in NRHP): Many are still in service as passenger stations of the New Jersey Transit system over 100 years after they were built. He sometimes worked with the railroad's chief engineer, Lincoln Bush. Before working for the Delaware, Lackawanna & Western, Nies was a partner in the architectural firm Finkler & Nies, with Adolph Finkler, in Chicago in 1896.

== Works ==
- Newark Broad Street Station (1901–03), Broad and University Sts., Newark, N.J., (Nies, Frank J.), NRHP
- Delaware, Lackawanna and Western Railroad Station (Dover) (1902), N. Dickerson St., Dover, N.J., (Nies, F.J.), NRHP
- Delaware, Lackawanna and Western Railroad Water Gap Station (1903), Waring Dr., Delaware Water Gap, PA, (Nies, Frank, J.), NRHP
- Delaware, Lackawanna and Western record building (1904), Hoboken, N.J.
- Delaware, Lackawanna and Western Railroad Yard-Dickson Manufacturing Co. Site
- Locomotive and Car Repair Shops, Kingslan, N.J. (1904)
- Delaware, Lackawanna and Western car shops (1904), Keyser Valley, Pennsylvania
- Delaware, Lackawanna and Western Railroad Station (Boonton) (1905), Myrtle Ave., Main, and Division Sts., Boonton, N.J., (Nies, Frank J.), NRHP
- Ampere Station (1907), Ampere Plaza and Whitney Pl., East Orange, N.J., (Nies, Frank J.), NRHP
- Delaware, Lackawanna and Western locomotive shops (1907), Scranton, Pennsylvania ,
- Lake Hopatcong Station (1911), Landing Road, Roxbury Township, New Jersey; William Hull Botsford, Frank J. Nies, and V. D. Steinbach, architects; NRHP
- Bloomfield Station (1912), Washington St. and Glenwood Ave., Bloomfield, N.J., (Nies, Frank J.), NRHP
- Delaware, Lackawanna and Western Railroad Station (Morristown) (1913), 132 Morris St., Morristown, N.J., (Nies, F.J.), NRHP
- Phillipsburg Union Station (1914), 178 South Main Street, Phillipsburg, New Jersey, NRHP
- Station and Freight House, Far Hills, N.J. (1914)
- Morris Plains Station (1915), Speedwell Ave., Morris Plains, N.J., (Nies, Frank J.), NRHP
- Mountain Station (1915), 449 Vose Ave., South Orange, N.J., (Nies, Frank J.), NRHP
- Madison Station (1916), Kings Rd., Madison, N.J., (Nies, Frank J.), NRHP
- South Orange Station (1916), 19 Sloan St., South Orange, N.J., (Nies, Frank J.), NRHP
- Orange Station (1918), 73 Lincoln Ave., Orange, N.J., (Nies, F.J.), NRHP
- Freight House, Hoboken, N.J. (1918)
- Houses for mine foreman and miners, Loomis colliery, Plymouth, Pennsylvania (1919)
- Brick Church Station (1921), Brick Church Plaza, East Orange, N.J., (Nies, F.J.), NRHP
- East Orange Station (1922), 65 City Hall Plaza, East Orange, N.J., (Nies, F.W.), NRHP

== See also ==
- Operating Passenger Railroad Stations Thematic Resource (New Jersey)
- Bradford Gilbert
- George E. Archer

== Gallery ==
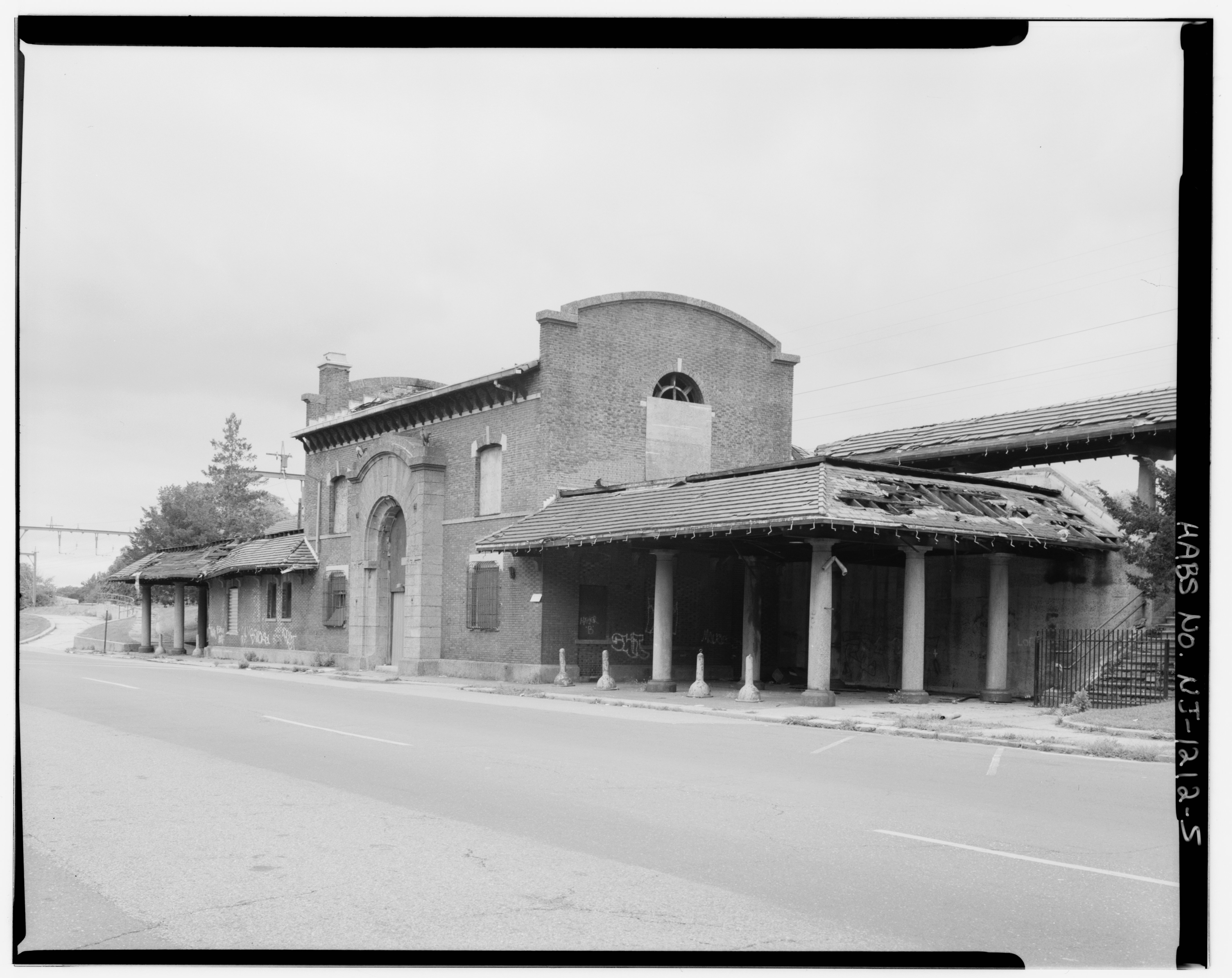
Ampere Station

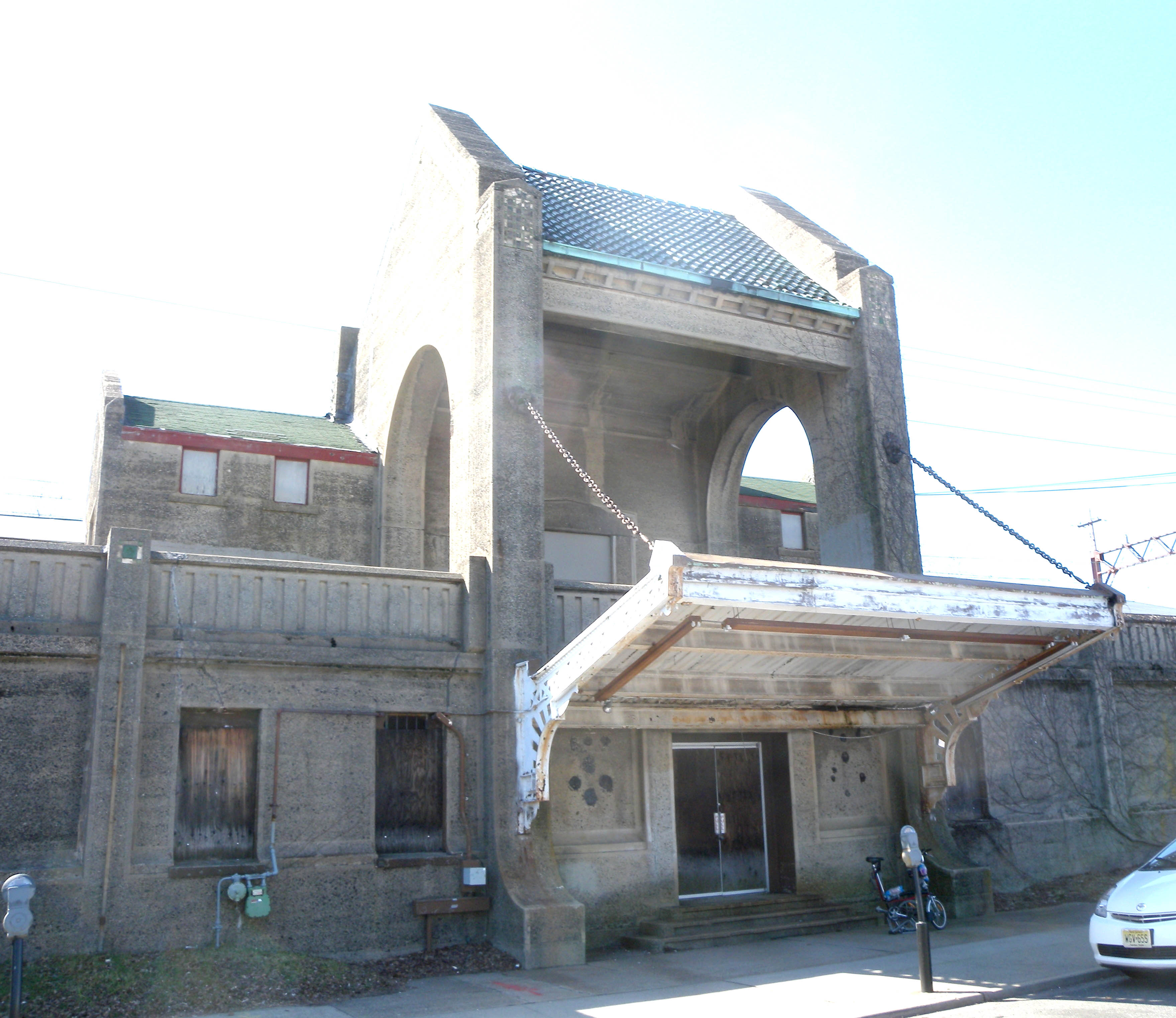
Bloomfield Station

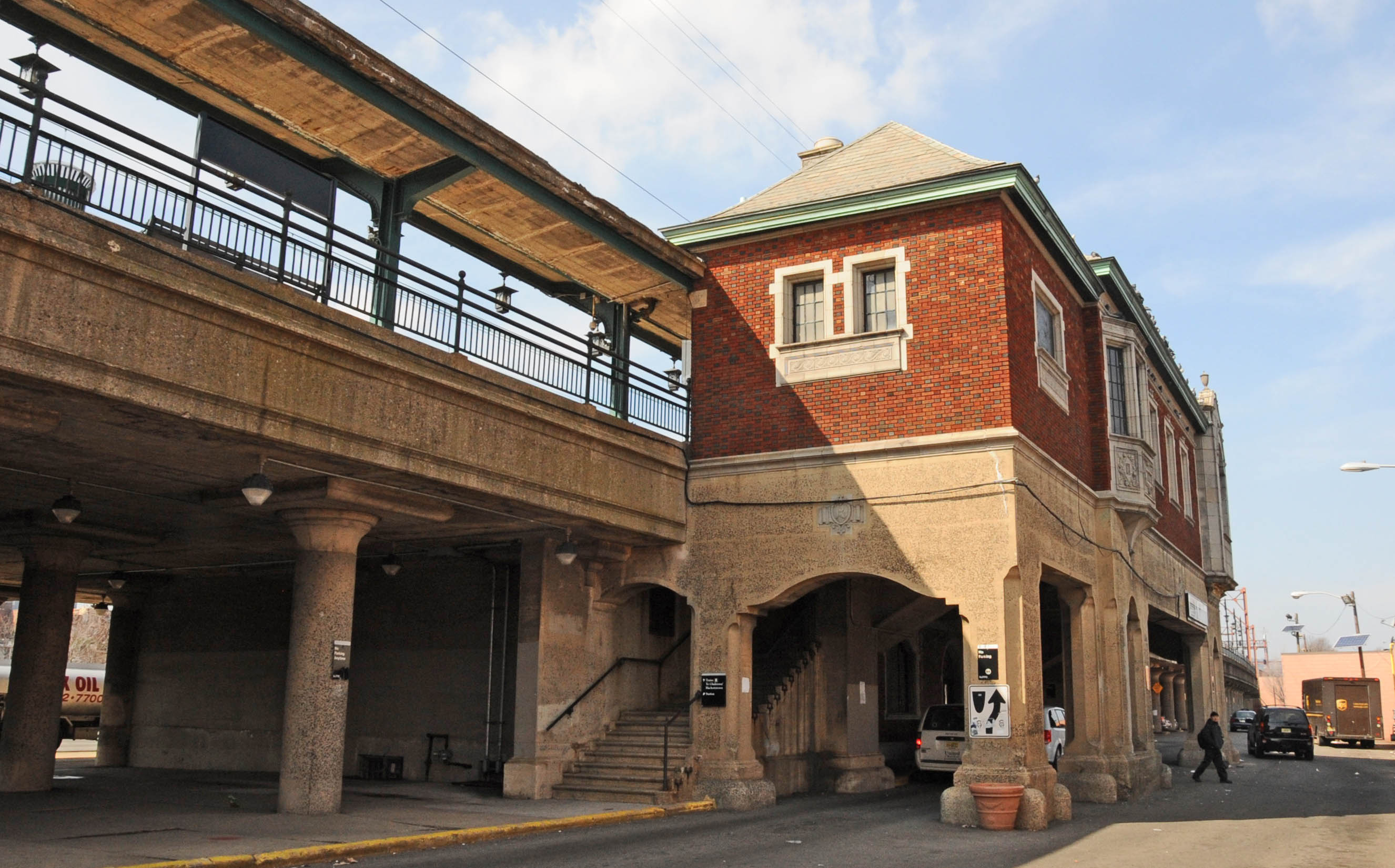
Brick Church Station

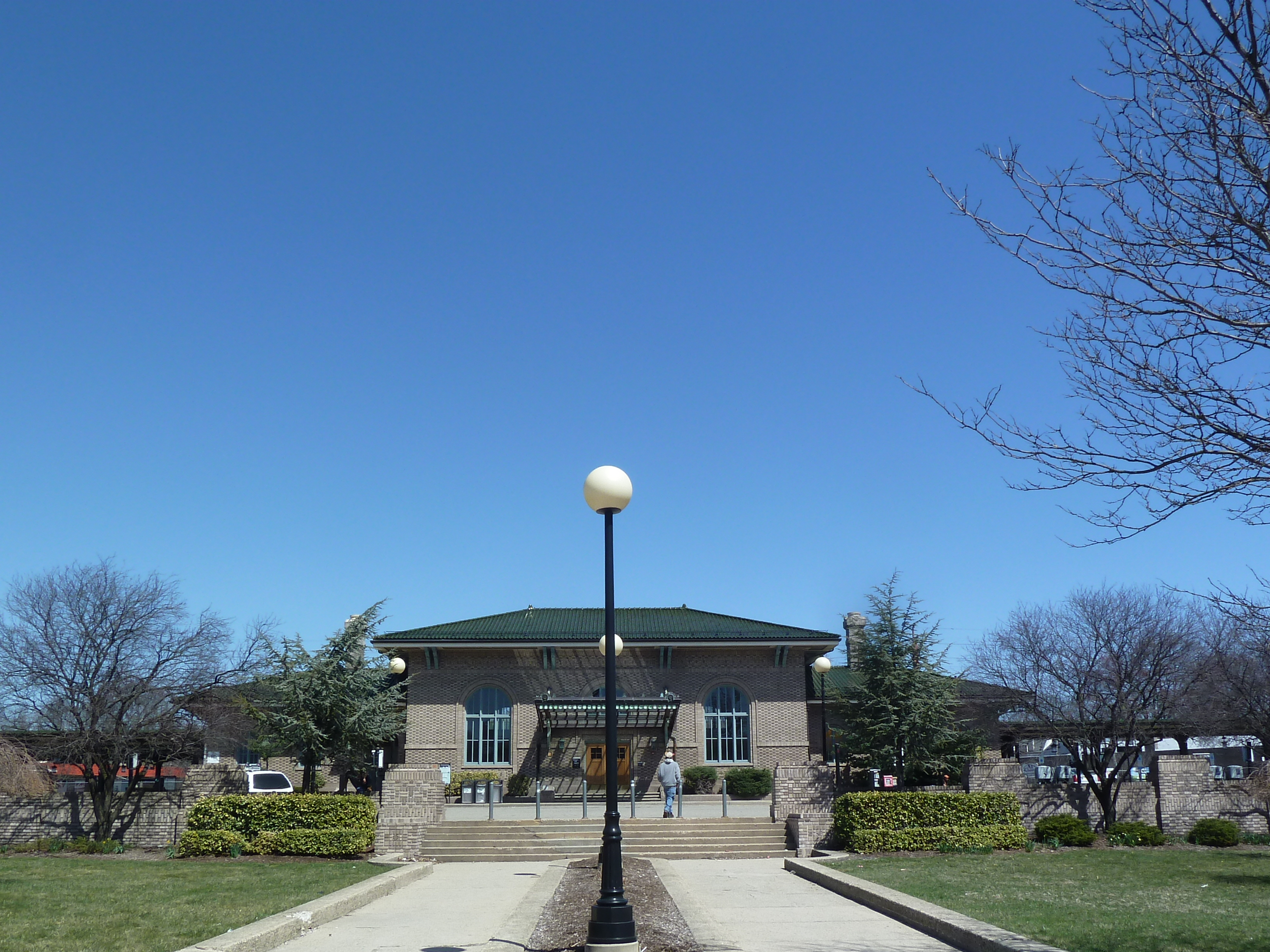
Morristown Station

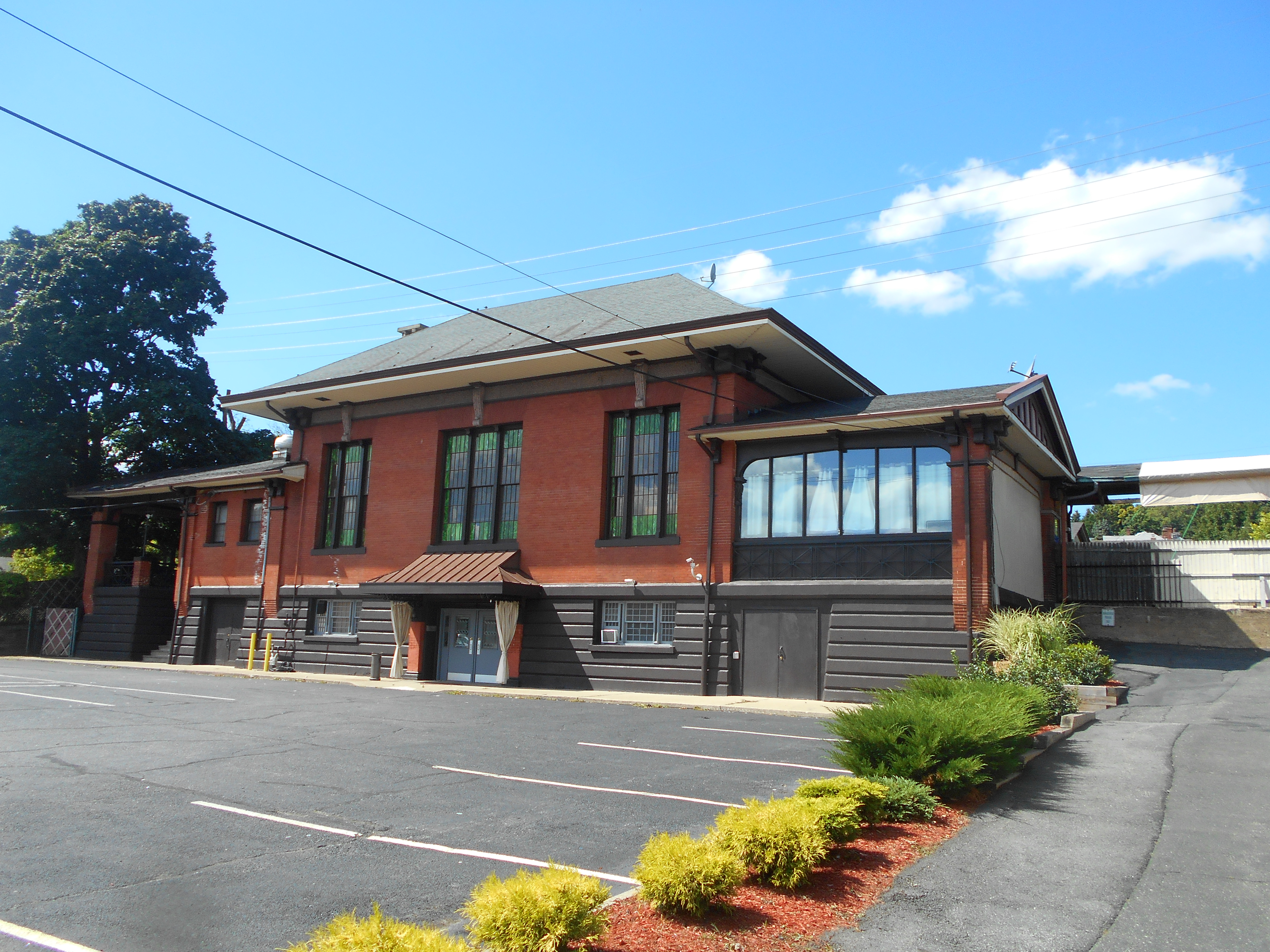
Boonton Station

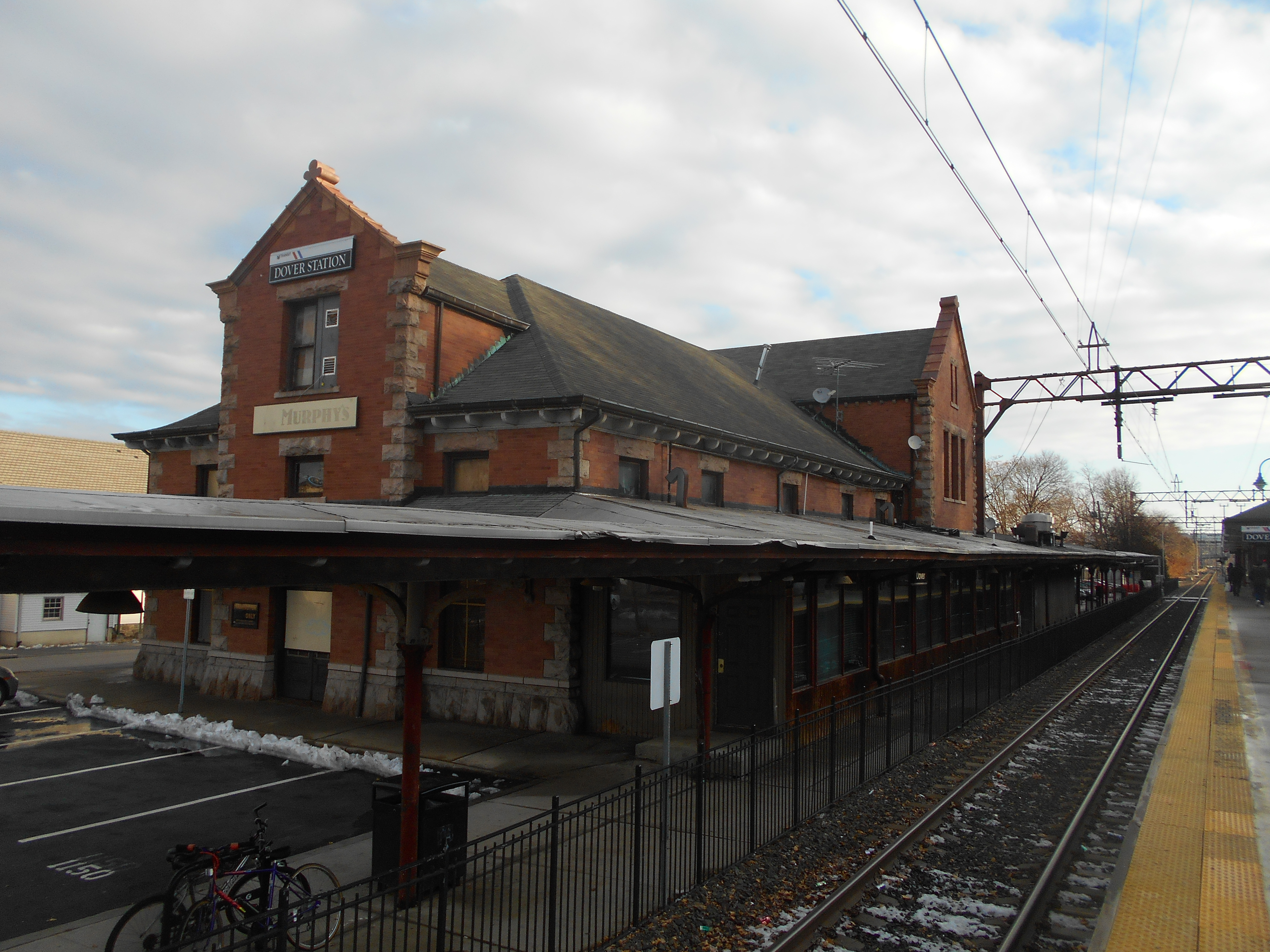
Dover Station

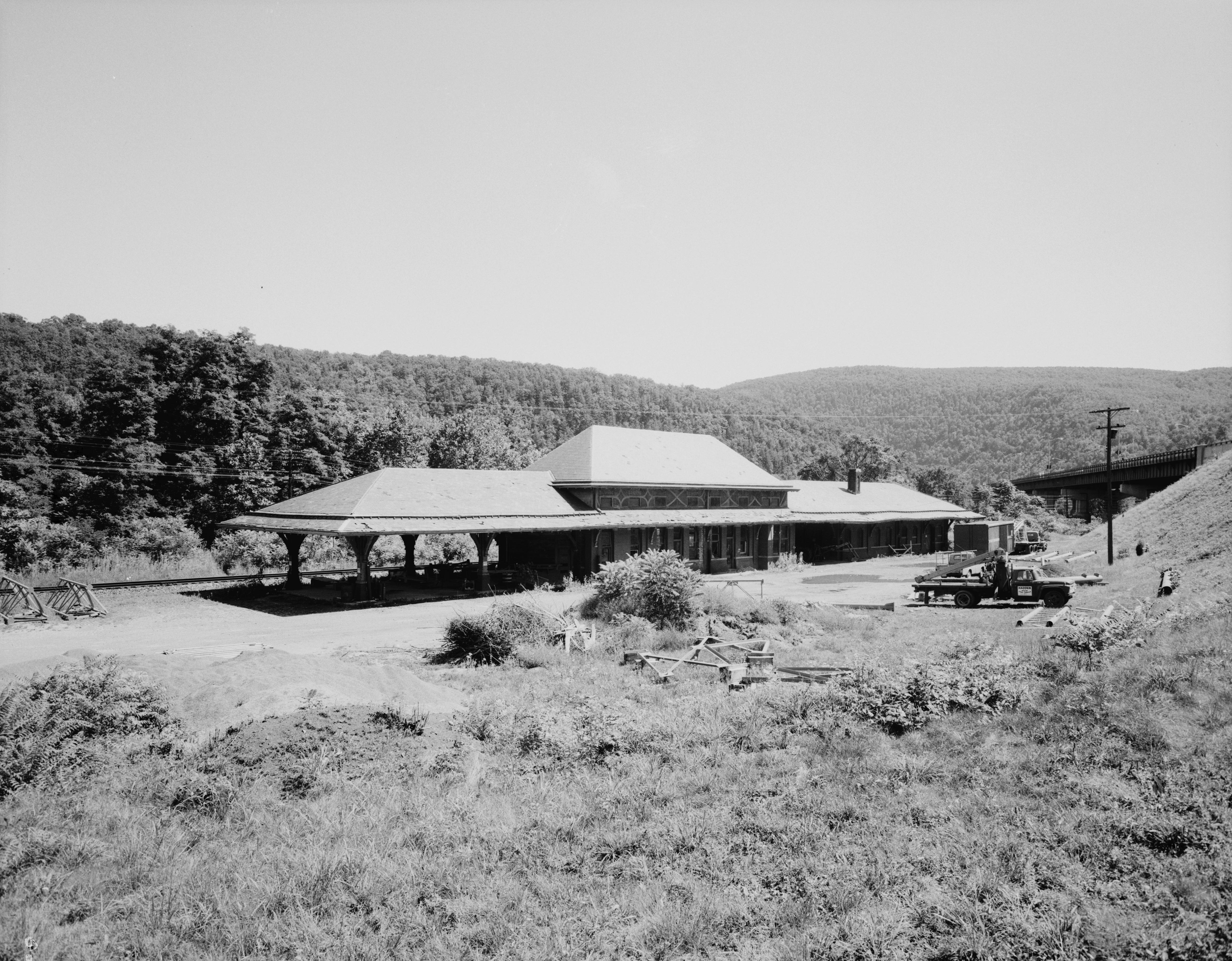
Delaware Water Gap Station

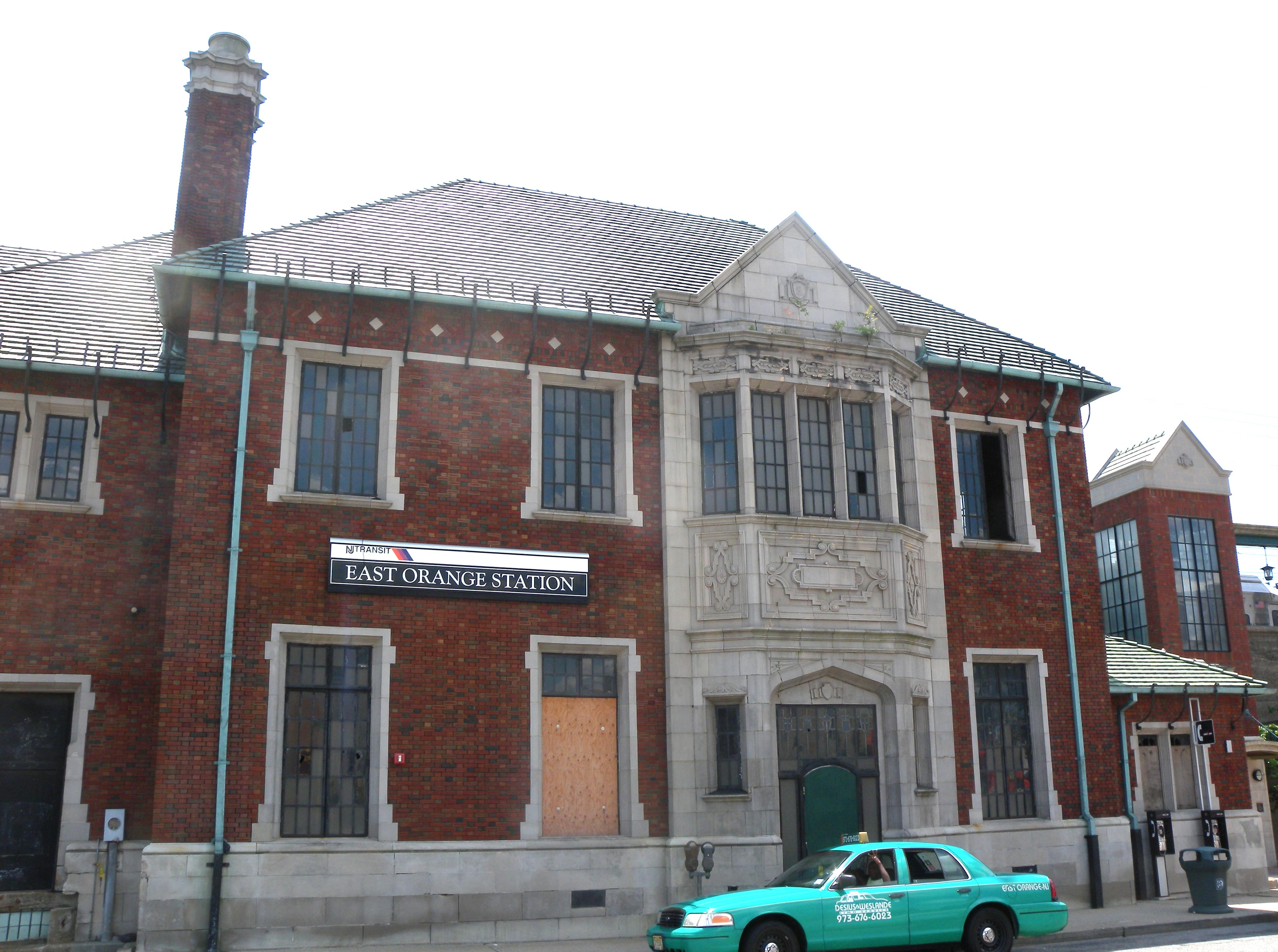
East Orange Station

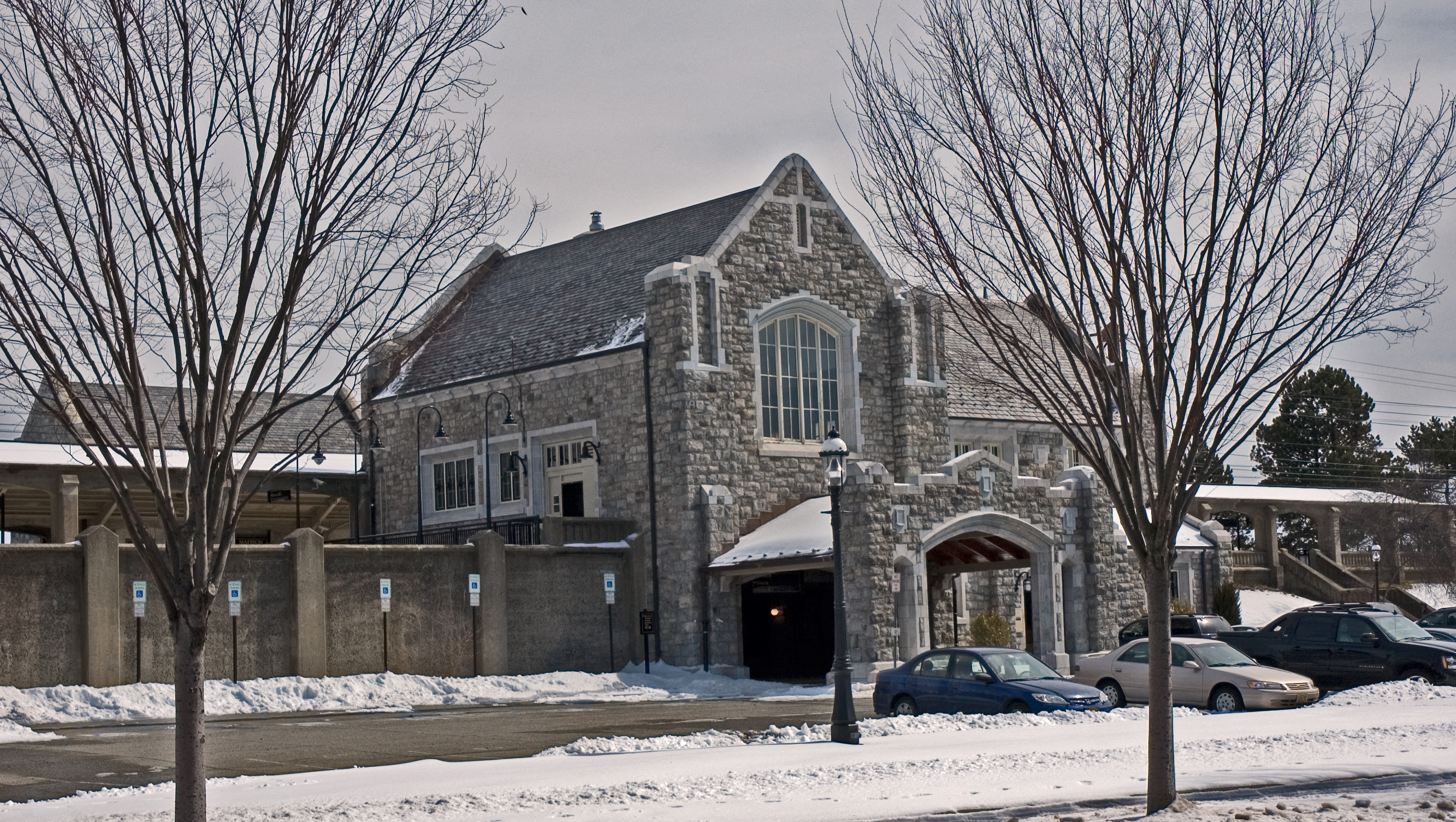
Madison Station

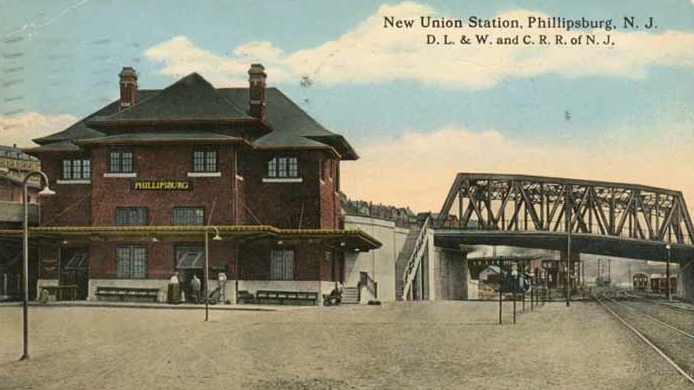
Phillipsburg Union Station

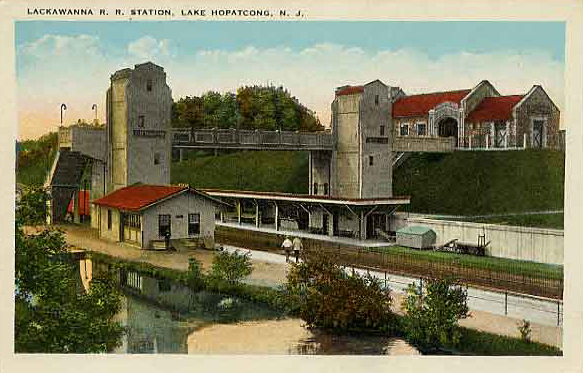
Lake Hopatcong Station
