= Morristown station =

NJ Transit rail station

Morristown
- The station building in 2026

General information
- Location: 132 Morris Street; Morristown, New Jersey, U.S.
- Platforms: 2 side platforms
- Tracks: 2
- Connections: NJ Transit Bus: 871, 872, 873, 874, 875, 880; Community Coach: 77

Construction
- Parking: 455 spaces
- Accessible: yes

Other information
- Station code: 430 (Delaware, Lackawanna and Western)
- Fare zone: 14

History
- Opened: January 1, 1838
- Rebuilt: November 3, 1913
- Electrified: December 18, 1930

Passengers
- 2025: 1,236 (average weekday)
- Rank: 23 of 153

Services
Preceding station	NJ Transit	Following station
Morris Plains toward Hackettstown	Morristown Line	Convent Station toward New York or Hoboken
Former services
Preceding station	Delaware, Lackawanna and Western Railroad	Following station
Morris Plains toward Buffalo	Main Line	Convent Station toward Hoboken
Preceding station	Morristown and Erie Railroad	Following station
Terminus	Main Line	Monroe–Cedar Knolls toward Essex Fells
- Delaware, Lackawanna and Western Railroad Station, also known as Morristown Railroad Station
- U.S. National Register of Historic Places
- New Jersey Register of Historic Places
- Location within Morris County, New Jersey Location within New Jersey Location within the United States
- Coordinates: 40°47′50″N 74°28′27″W
- Architect: Frank J. Nies
- Architectural style: Italian Villa
- MPS: Operating Passenger Railroad Stations TR
- NRHP reference No.: 80002514
- NJRHP No.: 2186

Significant dates
- Added to NRHP: March 11, 1980
- Designated NJRHP: October 26, 1979
Location

Morristown station is a NJ Transit rail station on the Morristown Line, serving the town of Morristown, in Morris County, New Jersey, United States. It serves an average of 1,800 passengers on a typical weekday. Construction of the historic station began in 1912 and the facility opened November 3, 1913. A station agent and waiting room are available weekdays. The station's interior was featured in Cyndi Lauper's "Time After Time" video in 1984. Just west of the station, at Baker Interlocking, the Morristown and Erie Railway branches off the NJT line. The M&E's offices and shop are here.

Morristown received accessible mini-high level platforms in 2005 to make the station handicapped accessible. The eastbound ramp is near Morris Street and the westbound ramp is just west of the old freight house. Morristown station has 455 parking spaces spread across three different lots near the station.

== History ==
A predecessor station was the terminus of the Morris and Essex Railroad, using the same railbed, constructed in 1835.

Ultimately the line extended to the east to Hoboken and the Hudson River connecting to New York by ferry.

The line was previously used by a series of Delaware, Lackawanna and Western and Erie Lackawanna railway companies from the 19th century until the 1960s. The Morristown and Erie Railroad (not to be confused with the Morris and Essex) operated passenger service to Essex Fells until 1928. In earlier years long distance trains, such as the Chicagoan and the Lackawanna Limited, stopped at the station on their trips west. Since 1947, main line interstate trains going west beyond Dover station bypassed the station. However, in spring 2021, Amtrak announced plans for potential New York–Scranton route. Amtrak included Morristown station as an intermediate stop between Summit station and Dover station.

In 1913, the Delaware, Lackawanna and Western station house was built, designed by Frank J. Nies. In 1980, it was named to the National Register of Historic Places.

== Station layout ==
The station has two tracks, each with a mini-high and low-level side platform.

== See also ==
- National Register of Historic Places listings in Morris County, New Jersey
- Operating Passenger Railroad Stations Thematic Resource (New Jersey)

== Bibliography ==
- Order of Railway Conductors and Brakemen (1913). The Conductor and Brakeman, Volume 30. Cedar Rapids, Iowa: Order of Railway Conductors and Brakemen.
