= Dover station (NJ Transit) =

NJ Transit rail station

Dover
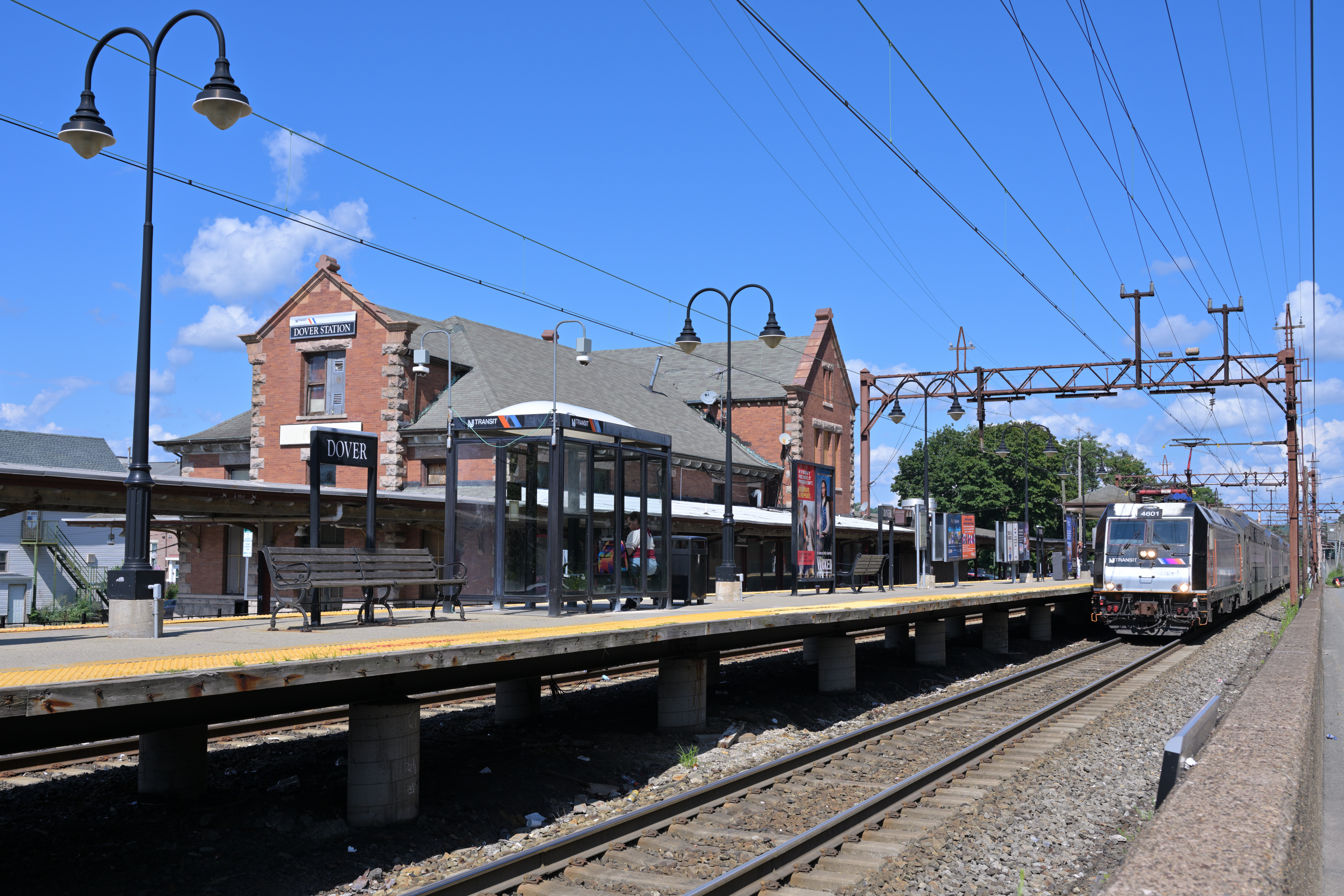
- Dover station in 2026

General information
- Location: 7 East Dickerson Street, Dover, New Jersey 07801
- Owner: NJ Transit
- Platforms: 1 island platform
- Tracks: 2
- Connections: NJT Bus: 875, 880

Construction
- Parking: Hourly and reserved
- Accessible: Yes

Other information
- Station code: 38 (Delaware, Lackawanna and Western)
- Fare zone: 17

History
- Opened: July 31, 1848
- Rebuilt: November 1, 1901
- Electrified: January 22, 1931

Passengers
- 2025: 660 (average weekday)
- Rank: 44 of 153

Services
Preceding station	NJ Transit	Following station
Mount Arlington toward Hackettstown	Montclair–Boonton Line limited service	Denville toward New York or Hoboken
Mount Arlington limited service toward Hackettstown	Morristown Line	Denville toward New York or Hoboken
Former services
Preceding station	Delaware, Lackawanna and Western Railroad	Following station
Mount Arlington toward Buffalo	Main Line	Denville toward Hoboken
Wharton toward Buffalo	Main Line	Denville toward Hoboken
Terminus	Rockaway Branch	Rockaway toward Denville
- Delaware, Lackawanna and Western Railroad Station (a.k.a. Dover Railroad Station)
- U.S. National Register of Historic Places
- New Jersey Register of Historic Places
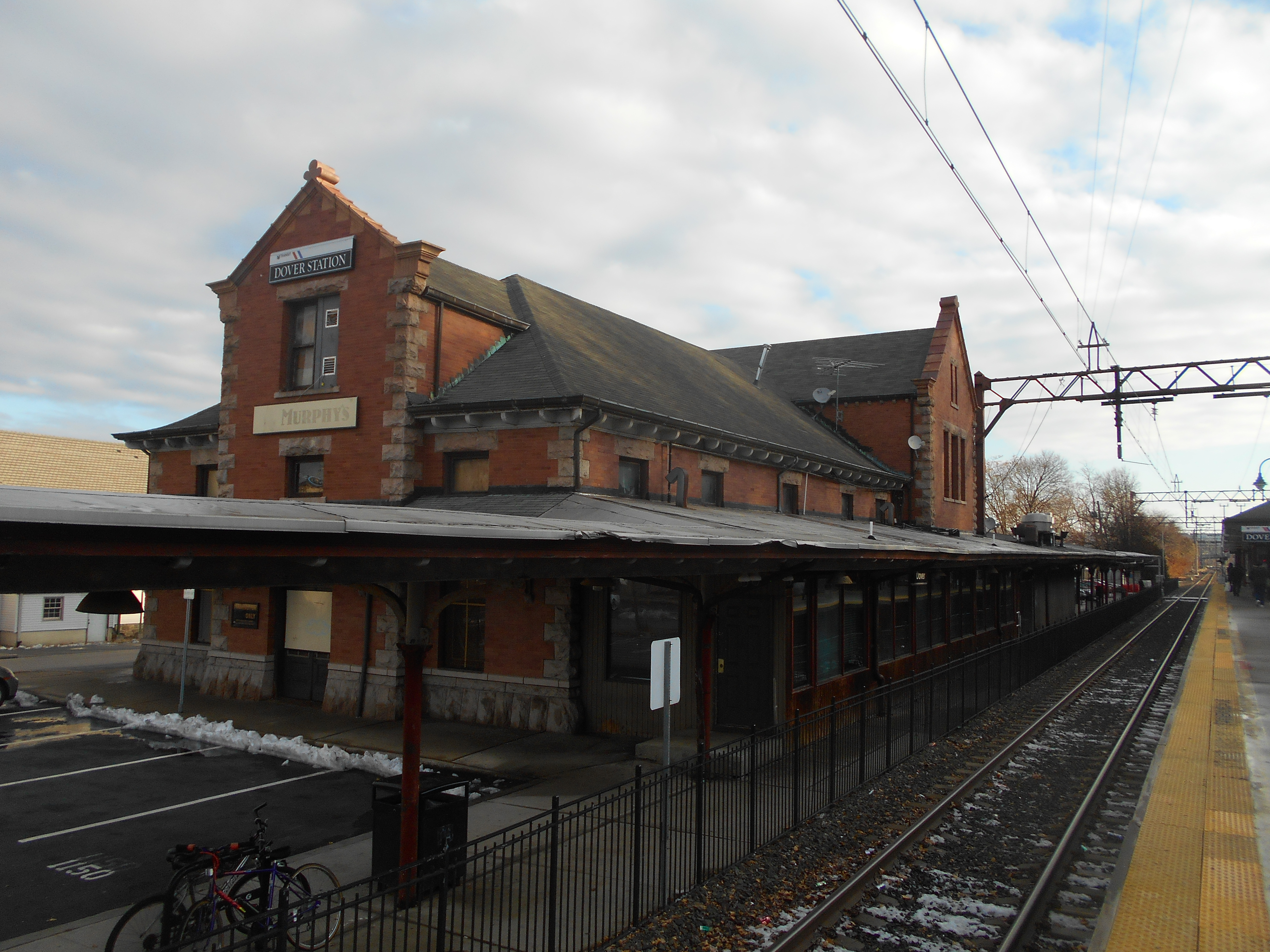
- The station depot at Dover, seen in December 2014 with no business renting the depot.
- Location: Dover, New Jersey, USA
- Coordinates: 40°53′01″N 74°33′20″W
- Area: 0.6 acres (0.2 ha)
- Built: 1902
- Architect: Frank J. Nies
- NRHP reference No.: 80002511
- NJRHP No.: 2109

Significant dates
- Added to NRHP: May 23, 1980
- Designated NJRHP: February 1, 1980
Location

Dover is an commuter railroad train station in the town of Dover, Morris County, New Jersey. Located at the end of electric service, Dover station serves as a secondary terminal of NJ Transit's Morristown and Montclair–Boonton Lines. Non-electric service continues west to Hackettstown on both lines. The next station to the west is Mount Arlington while the next station to the east is Denville. Dover station consists of a single island platform, accessible for the handicapped.

The first train in Dover arrived on July 31, 1848, with the extension of the Morris and Essex Railroad from Rockaway, which opened just 27 days prior. The Delaware, Lackawanna and Western Railroad constructed the current station depot on Dickerson Street in 1901, opening on November 1. The station depot joined the National Register of Historic Places in 1980. Today the station serves as a major transportation center locally, it also serves commuters in nearby Sussex County.

== History ==
On July 31, 1848, the first train rolled into Dover over the Morris & Essex Railroad. In 1863, the Delaware, Lackawanna and Western Railroad (DL&W) acquired the Morris and Essex line. On November 1, 1901, this new Lackawanna Station was opened in Dover with the arrival of the Buffalo Express at 3:00 p.m. It was met by a citizens' committee and the Dover Cornet Band. After the dedication ceremonies, a dinner was served at the Mansion House Hotel.

== Station layout and services ==
Both the Morristown Line and the Montclair–Boonton Line serve this station, with service to Hoboken or to New York City via Midtown Direct. On Saturdays, Sundays, and holidays, no trains travel further west than Dover.

There is a single high center platform and a ticket agent in the building 7 days a week. A NJ Transit rail yard is located east of the station.

Most outbound Morristown Line and some Montclair–Boonton Line trains currently terminate at this station, as Dover is the end of electrification. Diesel service continues west to the terminus at Hackettstown.

== See also ==
- Operating Passenger Railroad Stations Thematic Resource (New Jersey)
- National Register of Historic Places listings in Morris County, New Jersey
- List of NJ Transit stations

== Bibliography ==
- Platt, Charles Davis (1922). Dover Dates, 1722-1922: A Bicentennial History of Dover, New Jersey, Published in Connection with Dover's Two Hundredth Anniversary Celebration Under the Direction of the Dover Fire Department, August 9, 10, 11, 1922. Dover, New Jersey: Charles Davis Platt.
