= Wheels (New Jersey Transit) =

Suburban bus service in New Jersey, USA

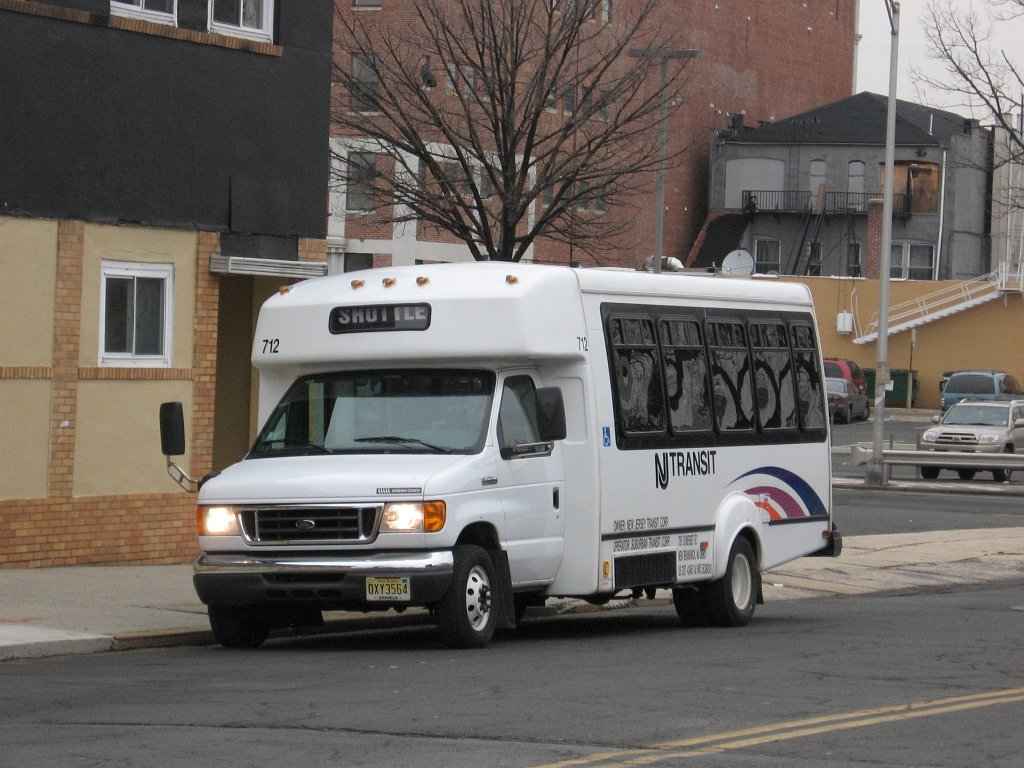
- #712 on the 986 by the Plainfield station
- Parent: New Jersey Transit Corporation
- Founded: 1993
- Locale: New Jersey
- Service area: Northern New Jersey, Hunterdon County, and Warren County
- Service type: Local bus service, shuttle service
- Routes: 6
- Operator: See Table
- Website: Official website

Wheels Suburban Transportation Services is a system of routes owned by New Jersey Transit and operated mostly under contract by private companies primarily in Warren and Union counties, as well as Northampton County in Pennsylvania. WHEELS also provided service in Hunterdon, Somerset, Sussex, Morris and Warren counties, which were eliminated in 2010 because of budget reductions.

== Routes ==
Route	Terminals		Major streets traveled	Contractor	Notes	History
329	See List of New Jersey Transit bus routes 300–399 Renumbered from 972.					
612	See List of New Jersey Transit bus routes 600–699 Renumbered from 976.					
878	See List of New Jersey Transit bus routes 800–880 Renumbered from 966, absorbed the 879 route.					
890 891	Pohatcong; Pohatcong Plaza	Easton, PA; Center Square	Roseberry Street; South Main Street (890); Heckman Street (891)	Trans-Bridge Lines	Weekday service only.	Began service to Pohatcong Plaza Shopping Center in October 2001.
986	Summit	Plainfield (rush hours); Berkeley Heights; Summit Medical Group	Somerset Street; Mountain Avenue; Springfield Avenue (reverse peak to/from Summit); Maple Street (peak to/from Summit)	New Jersey Transit	Weekday service only.; Provides alternate reverse-peak service for Gladstone Branch customers at Murray Hill and New Providence	Formerly Coach USA Suburban Trails until Oct 31, 2024. Transferred to New Jersey Transit on November 1, 2024.

=== Former routes ===
All routes below except 879, 966, and 976 were discontinued after May 28, 2010, due to budget constraints.

Short turn terminals are not shown.

Route	Terminals		Major streets traveled	Contractor	Notes
325	Vince Lombardi Park & Ride	Newark Penn Station	New Jersey Turnpike		Short-lived express route; discontinued due to low ridership.; Also served Meadowlands Sports Complex.
879	Convent Station	Florham Park; FDU Campus	Madison Avenue; Danforth Road; Florham Road	Saddle River Trails	Weekday service only; Merged into 878
884	Somerville	Clinton; Route 31 Park/Ride	Bridge Street; Routes 22 and 31	Suburban Transit	Weekday service only; Split from the 114 in 1993, then discontinued in 2010.; Formerly "Clinton-Somerville Connection".
960	Willowbrook Mall; Park & Ride	Meadowlands Sports Complex	Route 3		Discontinued in 1996.
965	Randolph or Dover	Parsippany		First Student	Discontinued around 1999-2000.
966	Convent Station	Morris Office Parks	Kahn Road; Park Avenue; Punch Bowl Road	First Student	Rush hour service only.; Split into 878 and 879, then combined again retaining the 878 route number.
966	Convent Station	Florham Park; FDU Campus	Madison Avenue; Danforth Road; Florham Road	First Student	Rush hour service only.; Split into 878 and 879, then combined again retaining the 878 route number.
967	Sparta; Ross' Corner	East Hanover; 1719 Route 10	Route 15, 46, and 10	First Student	Rush hour peak direction service only. (to East Hanover AM, from East Hanover PM)
970	Totowa; Gordon Dr/King St.	Passaic; Passaic Bus Terminal	Riverview Drive; Main Avenue (970); Madison Avenue (971)	Community Coach	Rush hour peak direction service only. (to Totowa AM, from Totowa PM)
971	Totowa; Gordon Dr/King St.	Paterson; Madison Ave/3 Ave.	Riverview Drive; Main Avenue (970); Madison Avenue (971)	Community Coach	Rush hour peak direction service only. (to Totowa AM, from Totowa PM)
972	Secaucus Junction	Harmon Cove; Harmon Cove Towers	Meadowlands Parkway; Seaview Drive; New County Road	Academy Bus Lines	Shuttle service began on August 4, 2003, following the closure of Harmon Cove Station, the line name was later dropped on April 3, 2004, and renumbered to 329 on August 30, 2008.
973	Hackettstown Mall		Hackettstown/Mansfield Loop	First Student	Weekday service only; The Blue route operates a clockwise loop, the Orange route operates a counterclockwise loop.; Both routes operate flex service as defined above along their entire routes.
976	Princeton Junction	Lawrence Township Loop	Clarksville Road	None; Hamilton Twp Garage	Rush hour service only.; 976 was renumbered to 612 in 2010.
977	Princeton Junction	West Windsor Loop	Princeton - Highstown Road, Quaker Bridge Road	Lion Tours	Rush hour service only.; 976 was renumbered to 612 in 2010.
978	Raritan Center	Newark Penn Station	New Jersey Turnpike	Red & Tan	Rush hour peak direction service only. (to Raritan Center AM, from Raritan Center PM)
979	Raritan Center	Irvington Bus Terminal	New Jersey Turnpike; Garden State Parkway	Red & Tan	Rush hour peak direction service only. (to Raritan Center AM, from Raritan Center PM)
980	New Brunswick	Piscataway; Municipal Complex	River Road; Hoes Avenue	Suburban Transit	Rush hour service only.; Began service to Colgate Research Center and Colgate Place South on July 13, 2009.
981	Port Liberté	Grove Street PATH	Caven Point Road; Pacific Avenue; Grand Street	Red & Tan	Main article: 981 Port Liberté–Grove Street: Rush hour service only.
984	Barnegat	Lakewood; Industrial Park	Route 70		Employer shuttle, short-lived service.
989	Hillsborough; Redwood Square Shopping Center	Bedminster; AT&T	U.S. Route 206	Suburban Transit	Rush hour service only.; Discontinued on April 7, 2003, replaced by SCOOT operated by Somerset County.
