= Plainfield station =

NJ Transit rail station

Plainfield
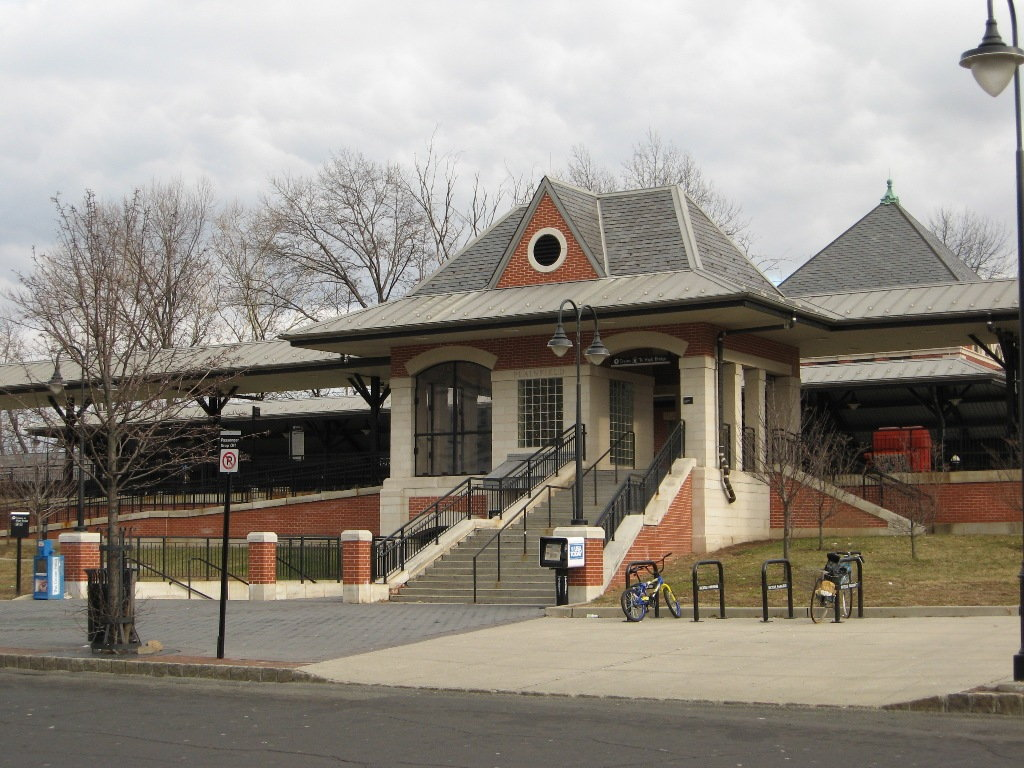

General information
- Location: 145 East 4th Street, Plainfield, New Jersey
- Owner: NJ Transit
- Line: Raritan Valley Line
- Distance: 23.1 miles (37.2 km) from Jersey City
- Platforms: 2 side platforms
- Tracks: 2
- Connections: NJ Transit Bus: 59, 65, 113, 114, 819, 822, 986

Construction
- Cycle facilities: Yes; bike racks
- Accessible: yes

Other information
- Fare zone: 11

History
- Opened: January 1, 1839
- Rebuilt: 1873; March 1901

Passengers
- 2025: 559 (average weekday)
- Rank: 52 of 153

Services
Preceding station	NJ Transit	Following station
Dunellen toward High Bridge	Raritan Valley Line	Netherwood toward Newark Penn or New York
Former services
Preceding station	NJ Transit	Following station
Grant Avenue Closed 1986 toward High Bridge	Raritan Valley Line	Netherwood toward Newark Penn or New York
Preceding station	Central Railroad of New Jersey	Following station
Dunellen toward Scranton	Main Line	Netherwood toward Jersey City
Grant Avenue toward Somerville	Somerville – Jersey City Local	Netherwood toward Jersey City
Preceding station	Baltimore and Ohio Railroad	Following station
Wayne Junction toward Chicago	Main Line	Elizabeth toward Jersey City
Bound Brook toward Philadelphia: Chestnut St. or Reading Terminal	Philadelphia – Jersey City Local	Elizabeth toward Jersey City
- Plainfield Station
- U.S. National Register of Historic Places
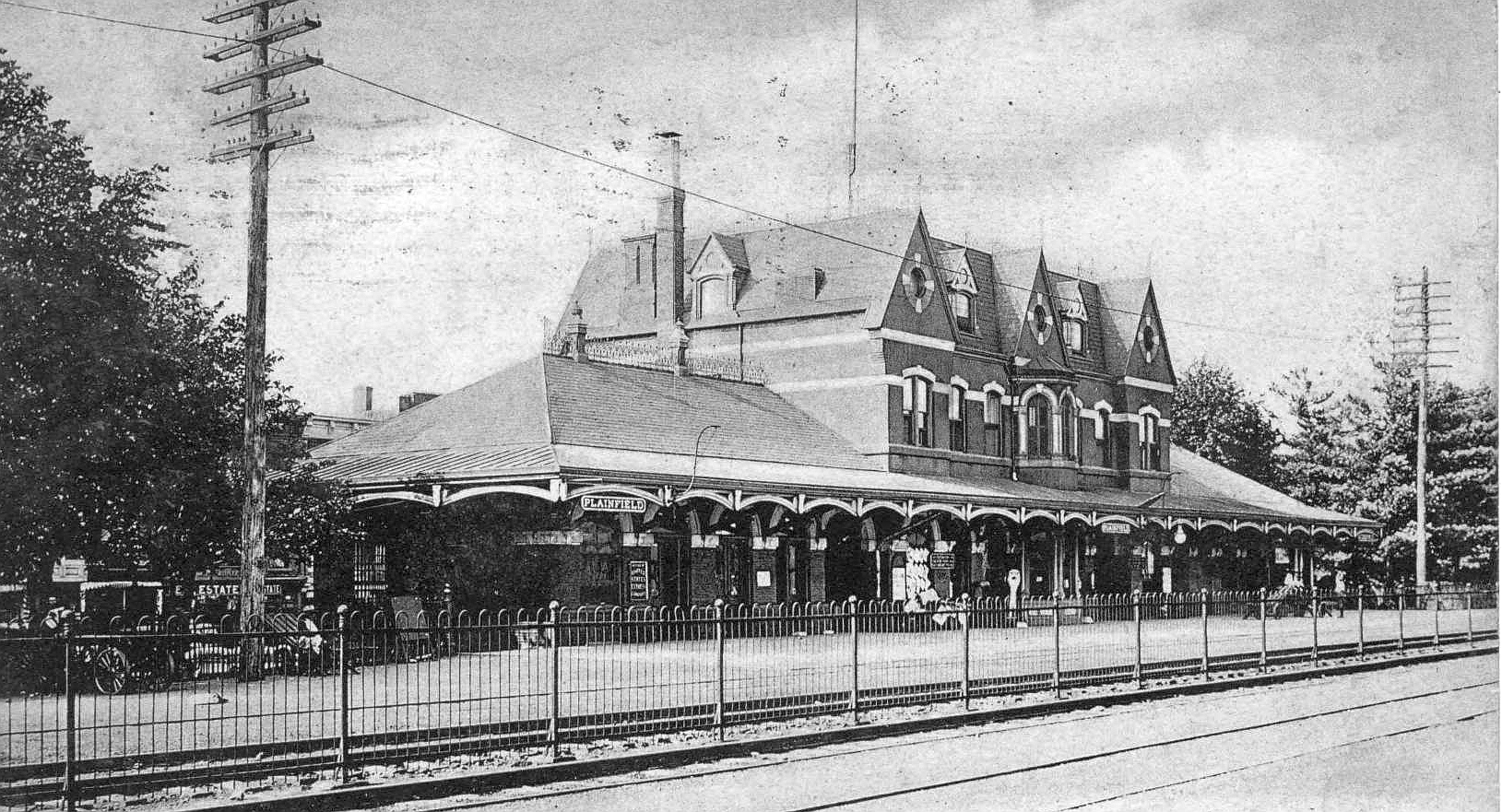
- Plainfield station in 1907
- Interactive map of Plainfield Station
- Location: North Avenue, Plainfield, NJ 07060
- Coordinates: 40°37′6″N 74°25′15″W
- Area: 3.5 acres (1.4 ha)
- Built: 1902
- Architects: Bradford L. Gilbert; Joseph Osgood
- Architectural style: Renaissance
- MPS: Operating Passenger Railroad Stations TR
- NRHP reference No.: 84002837
- Added to NRHP: June 22, 1984
Location

Plainfield station is an active commuter railroad station in the city of Plainfield, Union County, New Jersey. One of two active stations in Plainfield, the station serves trains of NJ Transit's Raritan Valley Line between Newark Penn Station and High Bridge in Hunterdon County. The next station east on the Raritan Valley Line, Netherwood, is also located in Plainfield. Plainield station contains two high-level side platforms, making it accessible for those with handicaps under the Americans with Disabilities Act of 1990. The 1902 built station depot built by the Central Railroad of New Jersey of plans designed by Bradford Lee Gilbert, stands on the side of the inbound platform and is listed on the New Jersey and National Register of Historic Places.

Railroad service in Plainfield began with the opening of the Elizabethtown and Somerville Railroad westward on January 1, 1839, serving as a temporary western terminus. At its peak, Plainfield maintained four stations along the line, with the main Plainfield station, Netherwood station, a station at Grant Avenue and a second station at Clinton Avenue.

== History ==
Plainfield station was originally built by Bradford L. Gilbert and Joseph Osgood for the Central Railroad of New Jersey in 1902. As with the rest of the CNJ, the station was subsidized by the New Jersey Department of Transportation in 1964 and absorbed into Conrail in 1976. The station is one of the two surviving CNJ stations in Plainfield (the other being Netherwood station), whereas the community previously had five; the other three being at Grant Avenue, Clinton Avenue, and another station named Evona. It been listed in the state and federal registers of historic places since 1984 and along with Netherwood is part of the Operating Passenger Railroad Stations Thematic Resource. The station underwent a reconstruction project in 2010 and kept its listing.

== Station layout ==
The station has two high-level side platforms serving two tracks. The inbound platform is 632 feet (193 m) long while the outbound platform is 626 feet (191 m) long; both can accommodate seven cars.

== See also ==
- List of New Jersey Transit stations
- National Register of Historic Places listings in Union County, New Jersey
