= 981 Port Liberté–Grove Street =

Bus route in New Jersey, United States

981 Port Liberté-Grove Street was a bus route operated by Seven Bus Corporation, a Coach USA subsidiary in New Jersey, under contract to New Jersey Transit for its Wheels service. This bus route connected Port Liberté with the Grove Street PATH station, and operated solely in Jersey City.

On April 14, 2010, as part of system-wide budget cuts, New Jersey Transit announced ending 981 Port Liberté-Grove Street in May 2010. As a result, Port Liberté announced plans to expand its private shuttle service to provide residents with access to Grove Street PATH.

== History ==
This route was originally operated by the Central Avenue Bus Company, which was chartered in 1925. By 1938, it had become the Central Avenue Bus Owners Association, an independent bus owners association of former jitney operators. By 1977, the route continued south from Journal Square, near the south end of Central Avenue, to the Central Railroad of New Jersey's Communipaw Terminal. The route was eventually acquired by Red & Tan in Hudson County, a subsidiary of Coach USA, and operated between Port Liberté and Hague Street in Jersey City Heights via Journal Square and Central Avenue as the 231. Coach USA cancelled the route on Friday, January 27, 2006, and New Jersey Transit began operating the 981 as a replacement service on Monday, January 30.

Only the portion south from Journal Square to Port Liberté did not duplicate any existing routes; NJ Transit's 82, 83, 84, 86, 87, and 88 routes already served the general area between Jersey City Heights and Journal Square or downtown Jersey City. Additional trips were added to the 87, which includes about half of the 231's Central Avenue run, to make up for the loss; Central Avenue now sees no buses from Franklin Street north to Congress Street.
