= Flemington station =

Flemington
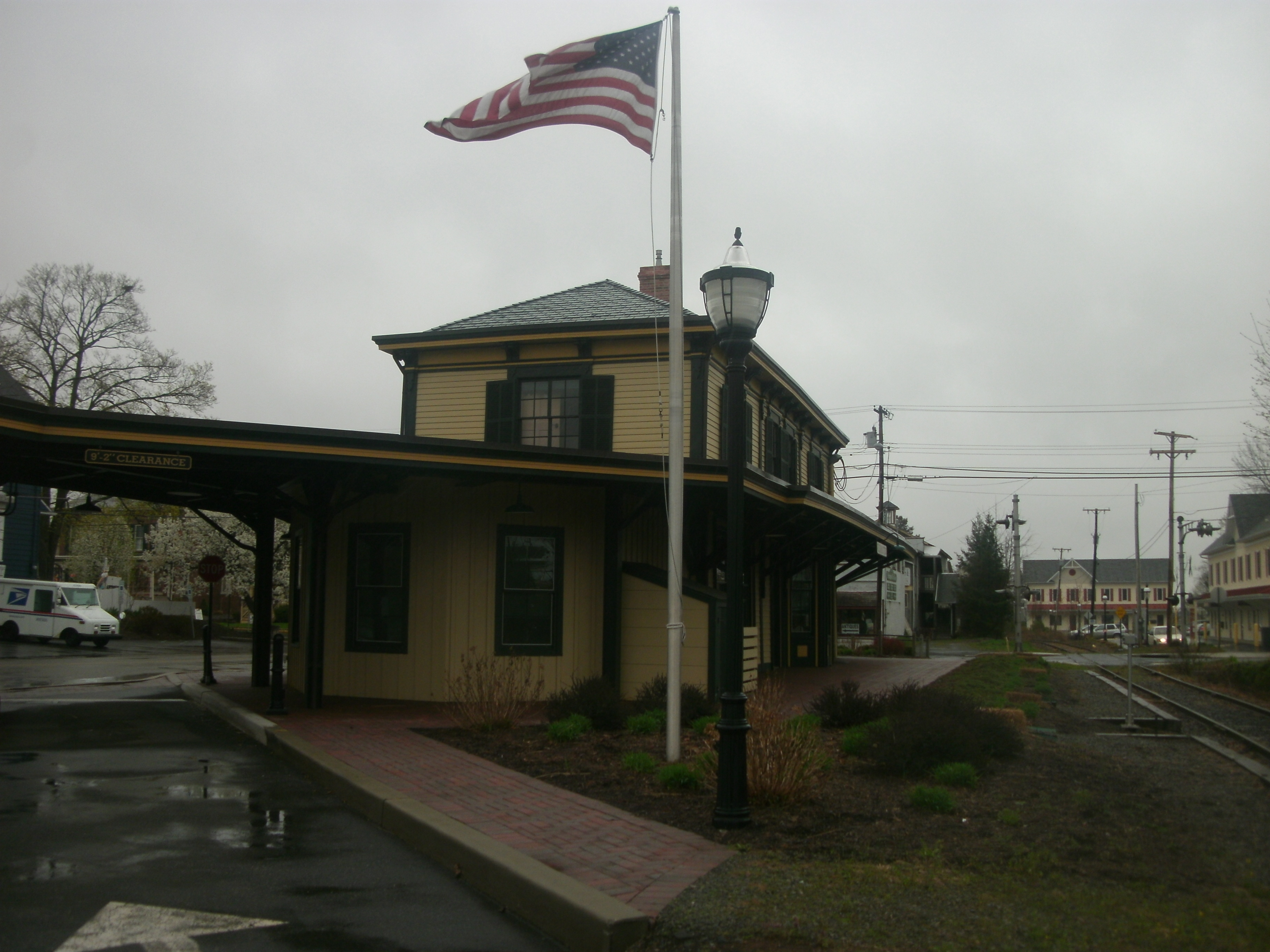
- Flemington station in April 2011.

General information
- Location: 157 Main Street, Flemington, New Jersey 08822
- Coordinates: 40.5067°N 74.8587°W
- System: Central Railroad of New Jersey station
- Line: South Branch
- Platforms: Side platform

History
- Opened: July 1, 1864
- Closed: April 25, 1953

Former services
Preceding station	Central Railroad of New Jersey	Following station
Terminus	South Branch	Three Bridges toward Somerville
Location

Flemington was a former station on the Central Railroad of New Jersey's South Branch in Flemington, New Jersey. The South Branch ran from a wye west of Manville–Finderne station to Flemington. Service at the station began on July 1, 1864 and passenger service was discontinued on April 25, 1953. The station currently serves as a branch of a local bank.
