= Bound Brook station =

NJ Transit rail station

Bound Brook
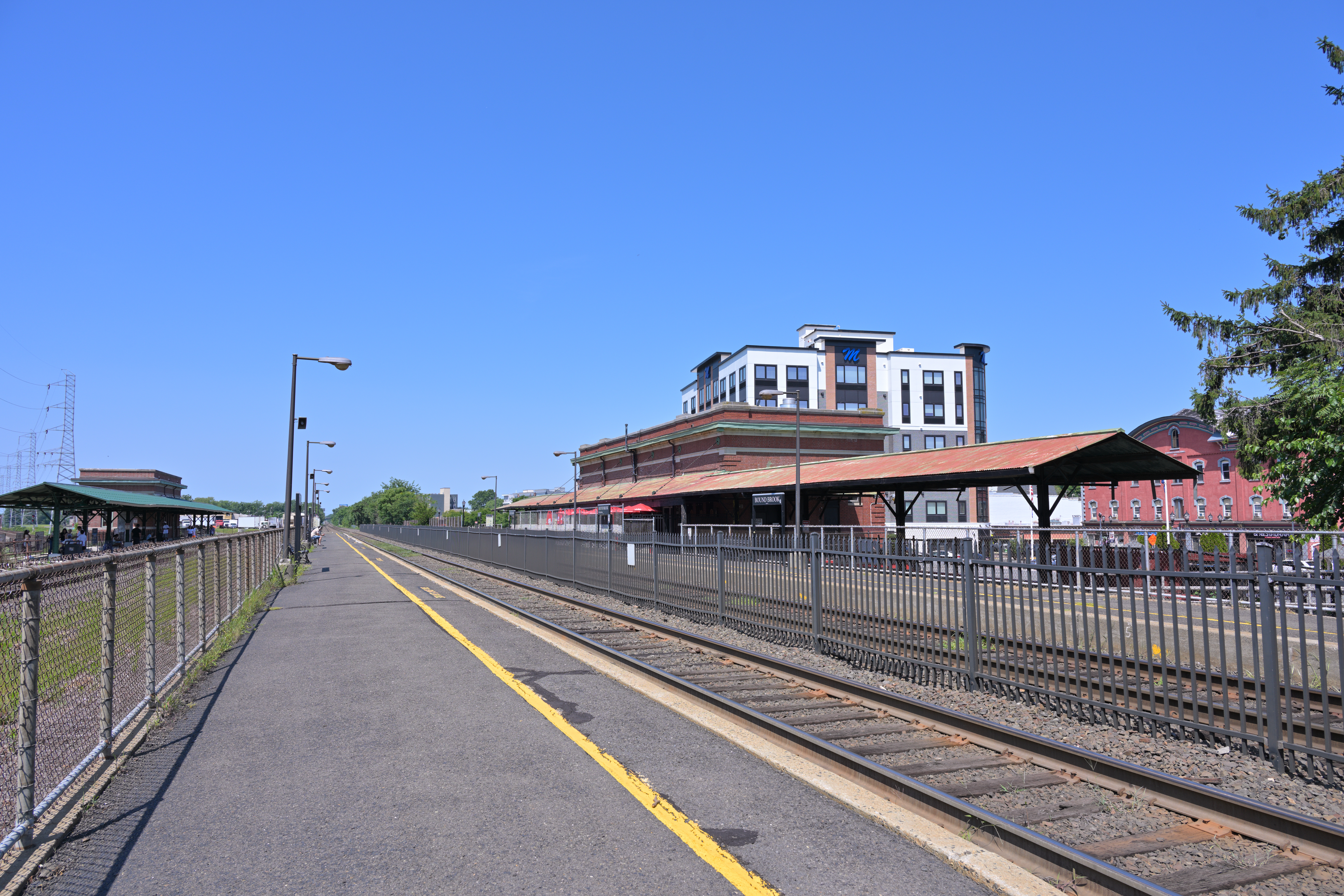
- Bound Brook station in 2026, looking west along the south platform

General information
- Location: 350 East Main Street (CRs 527 and 533), Bound Brook, New Jersey
- Owner: New Jersey Transit
- Line: Raritan Valley Line
- Distance: 30.2 miles (48.6 km) from Jersey City
- Platforms: 2 side platforms
- Tracks: 2
- Connections: Somerset County Transportation: CAT-1R, Scoot R1, Scoot R2, Davidson Avenue Shuttle (DASH; 851 and 852)

Construction
- Structure type: Canopy
- Parking: Yes
- Cycle facilities: Racks
- Accessible: No

Other information
- Fare zone: 14

History
- Opened: January 1, 1840
- Rebuilt: 1859–1860; 1872; July 1912–August 10, 1913
- Former names: Yellow Tavern (1840–1842)

Passengers
- 2025: 374 (average weekday)
- Rank: 73 of 153

Services
Preceding station	NJ Transit	Following station
Bridgewater toward High Bridge	Raritan Valley Line	Dunellen toward Newark Penn or New York
Former services
Preceding station	Conrail	Following station
Belle Mead toward Reading Terminal	Crusader and Wall Street 1976–1981	Newark Terminus
Belle Mead toward West Trenton	West Trenton Line 1981–1982 (NJ Transit)	Newark Terminus
Preceding station	Central Railroad of New Jersey	Following station
Somerville toward Scranton	Main Line	Dunellen toward Jersey City
Manville–Finderne toward Somerville	Somerville – Jersey City Local	Middlesex toward Jersey City
Preceding station	Reading Railroad	Following station
Belle Mead toward Philadelphia	New York Branch	Terminus
Preceding station	Baltimore and Ohio Railroad	Following station
West Trenton toward Philadelphia: Chestnut St. or Reading Terminal	Philadelphia – Jersey City Local	Plainfield toward Jersey City
Wayne Junction toward Chicago	Main Line Until 1926	Manhattan Transfer toward New York
- Bound Brook Station
- U.S. National Register of Historic Places
- New Jersey Register of Historic Places
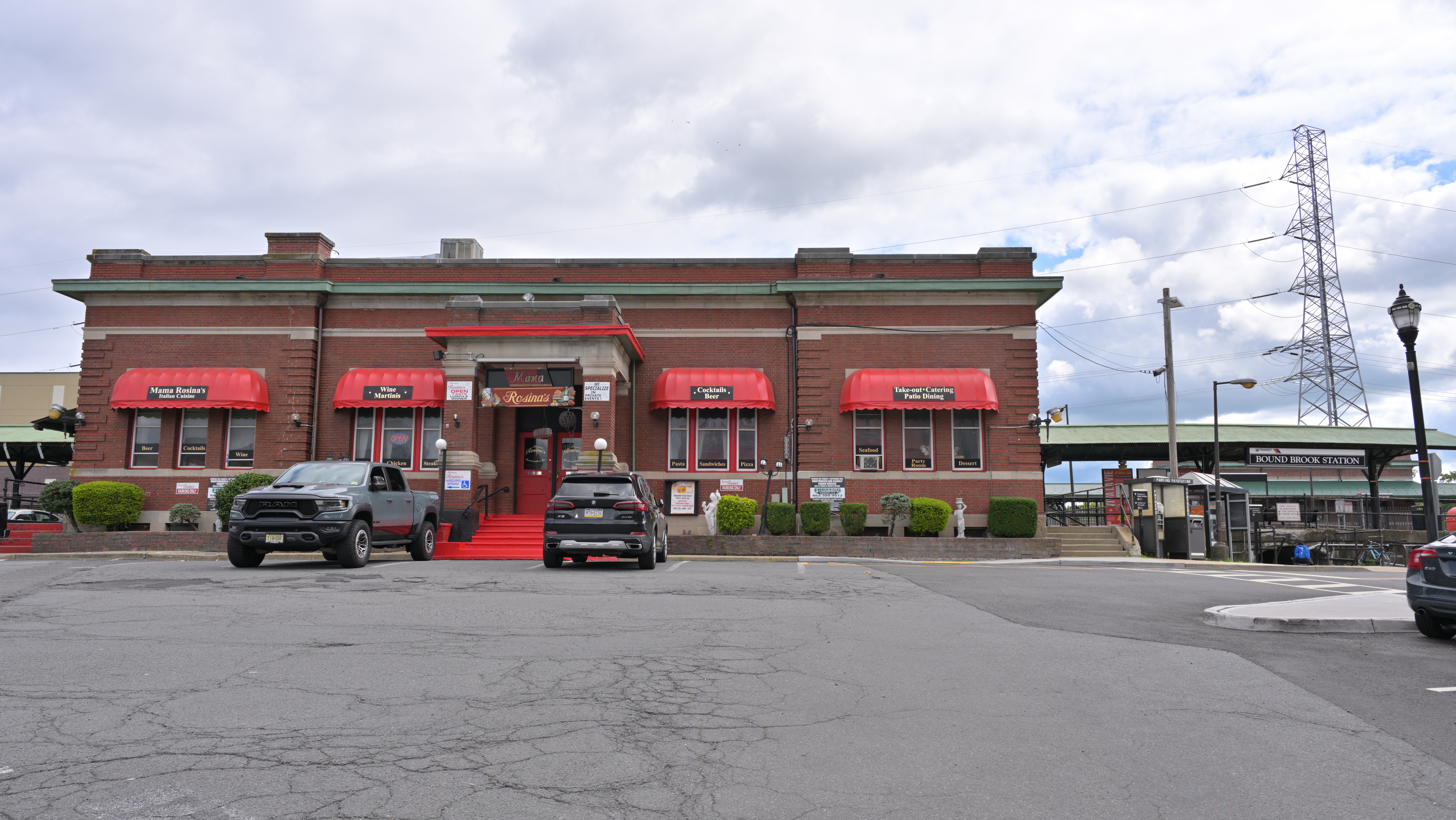
- Interactive map of Bound Brook Station
- Location: 350 East Main Street, Bound Brook, New Jersey
- Coordinates: 40°33′39″N 74°31′51″W
- Area: 1.5 acres (0.61 ha)
- Built: 1913
- Architect: William I. Houghton
- Architectural style: Classical Revival
- MPS: Operating Passenger Railroad Stations TR
- NRHP reference No.: 84002787
- NJRHP No.: 2481

Significant dates
- Added to NRHP: June 22, 1984
- Designated NJRHP: March 17, 1984
Location

Bound Brook station is an active commuter railroad station in the eponymous borough of Bound Brook, Somerset County, New Jersey. Located on East Main Street (County Routes 527 and 533) at the intersection with Hamilton Street, the station serves trains of NJ Transit's Raritan Valley Line, which operates between Newark Penn Station and High Bridge station in Hunterdon County. Bound Brook station consists of two low-level side platforms that surround two tracks. A pedestrian tunnel connects the two platforms. The outbound platform has the overhang of the station depot and in the inbound platform has a small shelter for passengers. Norfolk Southern Railway's Lehigh Line, which serves as the main access to New York City for the freight operator, runs their own tracks south of the inbound platform.

Railroad service in Bound Brook opened on January 1, 1840 as part of an extension of the Elizabethtown and Somerville Railroad west from Plainfield.

== History ==
The station at 350 East Main Street was opened on August 10, 1913, as a replacement station. This was a part of the Central Railroad of New Jersey Elevation Project from Elizabeth to Somerville (grade crossing removal). The station on the north side of the tracks replaced the original station (c. 1847–1848) that was located on the south side of the tracks as built by the Elizabethtown and Somerville Railroad.

Bound Brook station was listed on the New Jersey Register of Historic Places and the National Register of Historic Places in 1984 as part of the Operating Passenger Railroad Stations Thematic Resource.

== Station layout ==
The station has two low-level side platforms serving two tracks. Both are 400 feet (120 m) long and can accommodate four cars.

== Bibliography ==
- Bianculli, Anthony J. (2001). Trains and Technology: Track and Structures. University of Delaware Press. ISBN 9780874138023.
