= Bridgewater station (NJ Transit) =

NJ Transit rail station

Bridgewater
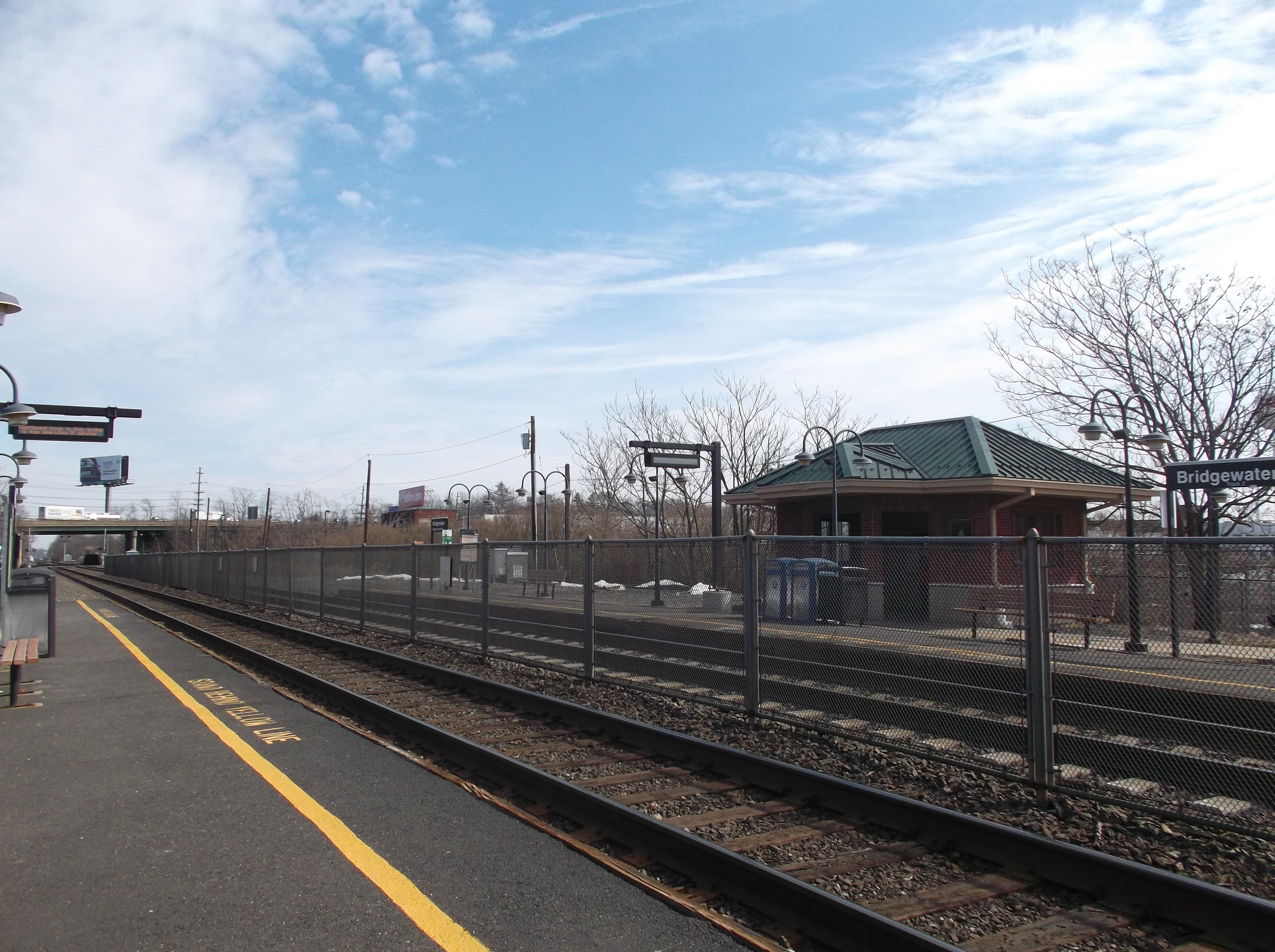
- Bridgewater station seen from the High Bridge-bound platform in March 2014.

General information
- Location: Steve Kalafer Way, Bridgewater, New Jersey
- Coordinates: 40.5598°N 74.5517°W
- Owner: New Jersey Transit
- Line: Raritan Valley Line
- Distance: 31.4 miles (50.5 km) from Jersey City
- Platforms: 2 side platforms
- Tracks: 2

Construction
- Accessible: No

Other information
- Fare zone: 15

History
- Opened: 1985
- Rebuilt: August 1999–July 17, 2000
- Former names: Calco (1985–1996)

Passengers
- 2025: 221 (average weekday) (NJT)
- Rank: 99 of 153

Services
Preceding station	NJ Transit	Following station
Somerville toward High Bridge	Raritan Valley Line	Bound Brook toward Newark Penn or New York
Former services
Preceding station	NJ Transit	Following station
Finderne (closed 2006) toward High Bridge	Raritan Valley Line	Bound Brook toward Newark Penn or New York
Location

Bridgewater is an active commuter railroad station in the namesake Bridgewater Township, Somerset County, New Jersey. Located on Steve Kalafer Way just south of Main Street (County Route 533), Bridgewater station serves trains of NJ Transit's Raritan Valley Line, which operates between Newark Penn Station and High Bridge station in Hunterdon County. Bridgewater station stands next to TD Bank Ballpark, the home stadium of the Somerset Patriots of the Class AA Eastern League. The station consists of two low-level side platforms. The outbound platform is accessed from the white parking lot while the inbound platform is only accessible with stairs from Steve Kalafer Way. A station shelter is present on the inbound platform.

Bridgewater station replaced the original Calco station, opened in 1915 by the Central Railroad of New Jersey to help serve workers at the American Cyanamid plant south of the tracks.

== History ==
Public meetings were held in March and April 1995 about improvements to train stations in Somerset County in preparation of a new study done by RBA Group, a Morristown firm. People at the meetings stated that they wanted to promote use of the Calco station as new park and ride to reduce the strain on Bound Brook station. With Calco station having a large parking lot, some Bound Brook riders noted that they would use Calco if the fares were the same for both stops. RBA Group released the study on June 15, making suggestions on what to do with various stations in Somerset County. At Calco station, they suggested that the railroad invest in making the station more prominent. This would involve installing new bike lockers, restrooms and ticket vending machines and working on promoting use of the station. They also looked at the possibility of a direct access point from Interstate 287, which was due east of the stop.

With the proposal for a new ballpark off State Route 28 and shopping center in the autumn of 1996, Somerset County officials stated that they would state that public transit needed to be a part of the project. With the American Cyanamid plant closed at the end of 1995, officials wanted to use the property for the new shopping center and baseball stadium. The renamed Bridgewater station (from Calco) served 35 trains at this point, with 18 making stops westbound and 17 making stops eastbound on weekdays. NJ Transit supported Somerset County's ideas, stating that they would involve themselves in discussions if requested. The agency added that they would upgrade the train station, which was two low-level side platforms with bus shelters serving as the only protection of commuters from inclement weather. NJ Transit would consider improving platforms at Bridgewater station, including make them high-level platforms and adding more shelters for people to use. Changes would require a renegotiation of its lease contract with American Home Products if they wanted to build a new station at Bridgewater.

Groundbreaking of the new $16.5 million ballpark occurred on April 29, 1998 for the new Somerset Patriots of the Atlantic League of Professional Baseball. The new ballpark, moved to Main Street (County Route 533) instead of on State Route 28, had a 10 month timeline for construction to be completed, starting in June 1998 in order to be ready by opening day in 1999. Being on the site of the American Cyanamid plant, some of the property was known to be polluted, but the spot where the new stadium would be built was free of any underground pollution.

Construction was well under way by July 1998, with parts of the abandoned American Cyanamid property being demolished, along with old concrete sidewalks and street lamps. A former parking lot for American Cyanamid was torn up to become the location of the new stadium foundation. With the demolition of the parking lot, NJ Transit commuters had to only use the east parking lot, which would remain for use in the new stadium, as well as commuter railroad use. NJ Transit also announced that they would begin construction in August 1998 to build an upgraded Bridgewater station to work with the new stadium. This would involve demolishing the bus shelters on the platforms and a utility building located on the property.

60% of the new stadium had been completed by February 1999, with opening day slated for May 15, 1999. Construction remained on normal pace, even with the possibility of inclement weather delaying the project. NJ Transit announced their requests for sealed bids on the Bridgewater station project later that month, with bids allowed through March 16, 1999. Plans for the project would involve the demolition of existing structures, including the station shelter, walkways and platforms. The new station contractor would be required to build a new station shelter out of cinderblock with its own gutter system, installation of amenities for it, and construction of new platforms and lighting for the structure. NJ Transit offered interested contractors a tour of the station on March 3, 1999 before finalizing their bids.

As part of construction, service stopped at Bridgewater station in order to facilitate demolition of existing structures except for the platforms. NJ Transit announced that stops at Bridgewater station would return on May 16, 1999, with new weekend service that would run for 12 hours a day in each direction on an hourly basis. Weekday service would see the station gain three stops on eastbound trains and two stops on westbound trains, bringing both directions to 20 trains daily at Bridgewater. The two westbound trains being added would be timed to arrive at Bridgewater station around game time. With the announcement that new stadium would not be open until June 7, NJ Transit's changes would be given to help riders learn the new schedule. At that time, NJ Transit stated that they were still evaluating bids from the February 1999 request and that the upgraded station would not be ready by June 7.

Construction of the new stadium finished on June 7, 1999 with crews dismantling their worksite by the mid-afternoon. The first game played at the new Somerset County Ballpark was done that same evening to a full-house of 6,360 seats and 20 luxury boxes.

NJ Transit announced that the new station at Bridgewater would not be ready in time for the final Patriots home game on September 9. They stated that they planned to award a contract for the upgrades by the end of June, with construction beginning around July 1. The new station, which would cost around $500,000 to build, involved building new sidewalks on the eastbound side that would reach the westbound side, which provides access to the new ballpark. A 350-square-foot (33 m^{2}) station shelter, made of bricks with a steel roof would be built to match the design of the stadium. The new shelter would also provide heating facilities. A new staircase would be installed on the westbound side, replacing the wooden stairs from the Calco station era. New lighting, landscaping and signs would also be installed. The expectation was that the new station would be ready around the beginning of October 1999. The contract was awarded to Bonita Contracting of Florham Park, who offered $365,000 for the project. Funding for the new station came from the New Jersey Transportation Trust Fund. Construction on the new project began in August 1999.

TD Bank Ballpark and Bridgewater station in June 2023. The former American Cyanamid site is on the left

NJ Transit announced changes to the Raritan Valley Line schedule in September 1999, introducing extra weekday night and weekend service because of new employment opportunities and increased shopping traffic tide the newly-constructed Bridgewater Promenade.

An opening ceremony was held on July 17, 2000 with NJ Transit Executive Director Jeffrey A. Warsh there to open the new station. Warsh, flanked by members of the Bound Brook Little League noted that the new station had a 469-space parking lot operated by NJ Transit and the Somerset Patriots organizations and that 47 Raritan Valley Line trains a day were stopping at the station. Ridership was on an upward trend, averaging 50 people per day, and with limited parking at Somerville station, expectations that the number would continue to rise. NJ Transit offered $1 off all tickets to Commerce Bank Ballpark, to promote use of transit to the new stadium.

NJ Transit officials dedicated the new Bridgewater station in honor of Arthur Reuben at a ceremony on December 18, 2001. Reuben, who died in November 1999, worked on helping with the drive for more public transit in Somerset County and the process on rebuilding Bridgewater station. He had been given a posthumous induction into the NJ Transit Hall of Fame in 2001. A plaque on the shelter was dedicated by Warsh, Somerset County planner Anthony McCracken and Reuben's widow, Sylvia.

== Station layout ==
The station has two low-level side platforms serving two tracks. The platforms are not accessible. Both are 113 feet (34 m) long and can accommodate two cars.
