= Dunellen station =

NJ Transit rail station

Dunellen
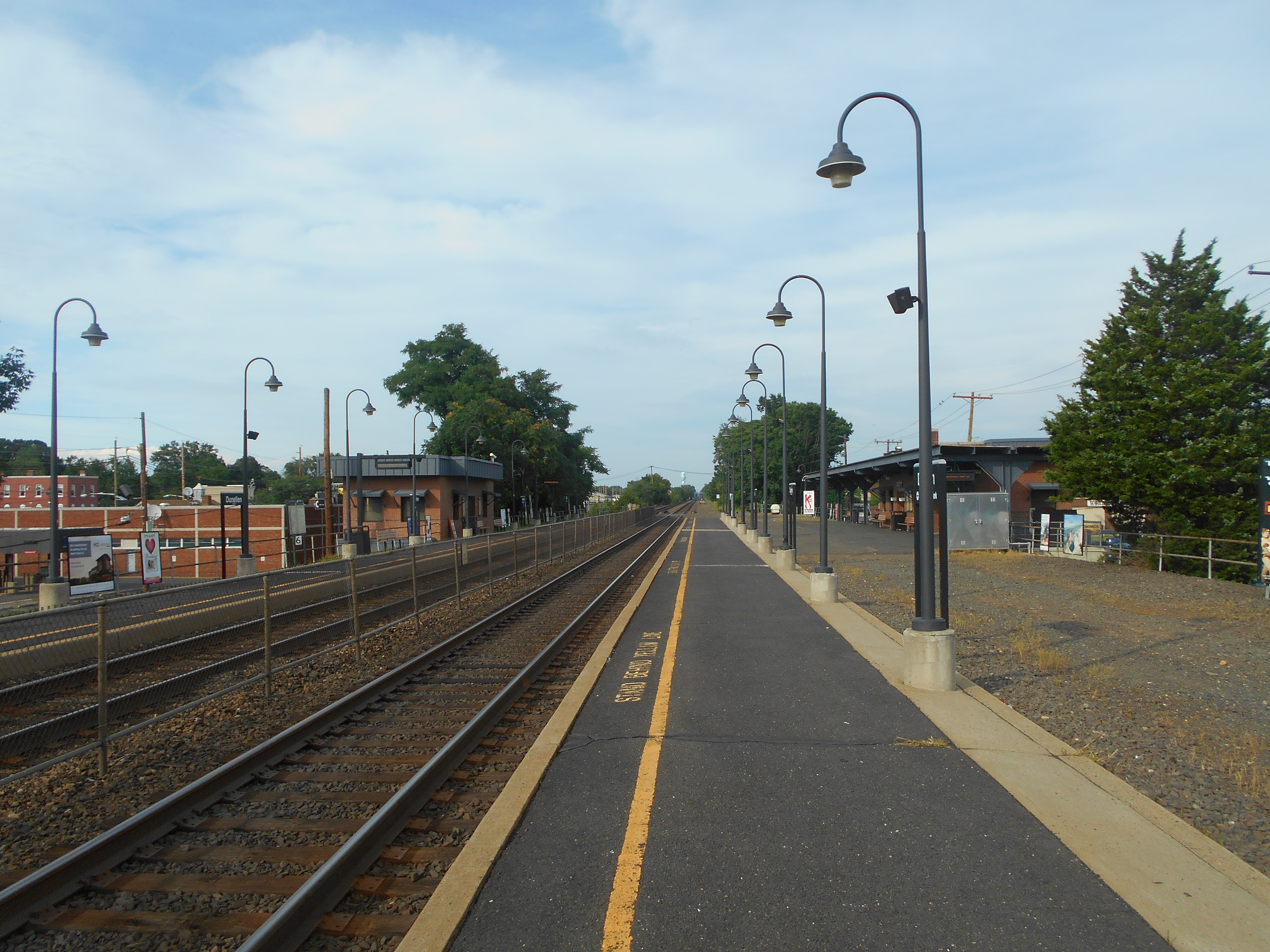
- Dunellen station in July 2014.

General information
- Location: South Washington Avenue and New Market Road, Dunellen, New Jersey
- Coordinates: 40°35′27″N 74°27′47″W
- Owner: New Jersey Transit
- Line: Raritan Valley Line
- Distance: 26.0 miles (41.8 km) from Jersey City
- Platforms: 2 side platforms
- Tracks: 2
- Connections: NJ Transit Bus: 59, 65, 113, 114; Suburban Trails: Dunellen Local

Construction
- Accessible: No

Other information
- Fare zone: 12

History
- Opened: January 1, 1840
- Rebuilt: 1868; December 10, 1955
- Former names: New Market (1840–1868)

Passengers
- 2025: 544 (average weekday)
- Rank: 54 of 153

Services
Preceding station	NJ Transit	Following station
Bound Brook toward High Bridge	Raritan Valley Line	Plainfield toward Newark Penn or New York
Former services
Preceding station	NJ Transit	Following station
Bound Brook toward High Bridge	Raritan Valley Line	Grant Avenue Closed 1986 toward Newark Penn or New York
Preceding station	Central Railroad of New Jersey	Following station
Bound Brook toward Scranton	Main Line	Plainfield toward Jersey City
Middlesex toward Somerville	Somerville – Jersey City Local	Clinton Avenue toward Jersey City
Location

Dunellen is an NJ Transit railroad station on the Raritan Valley Line, in Dunellen, New Jersey, U.S. It is the only Raritan Valley Line station in Middlesex County. There is a ticket office and small waiting area at this stop. A simple station, there are two tracks with two small side platforms. The station is located on a high embankment.

Trains stop serving the station at midnight and resume by 5 in the morning. Automatic ticket vending machines have been installed along with an automated voice telling commuters when their train will arrive.

== History ==
=== Grade crossing fight (1922–1950) ===
Since the opening of the railroad, the tracks of the Central Railroad of New Jersey (CNJ) crossed through the borough of Dunellen at grade level with roads. The borough began pressing the railroad to upgrade the tracks as early as April 1922, with complaints of the Washington Avenue (future CR 529) and Prospect Avenue crossings. Their complaint was that with the increasing traffic, the crossings were becoming unsafe for travel, and that the crossings were holding up traffic in Dunellen and nearby New Market. The citizens pressed the railroad to build a tunnel or a bridge for the two crossings in 1922 so trains, pedestrians and vehicles could all be accommodated properly. Residents pointed out in August 1922 that the project would cost probably $40,000 (1922 USD), compared to a project in nearby Westfield that cost $75,000. However, the borough noted that they could not afford such a financial project at that time. The railroad responded with the idea that a grade crossing removal could occur "someday," it was considered a project for the near future. The borough took the concept to the State Public Utilities Commission, but the commission would not act unless there was a petition by residents. The project halted to a standstill as a result.

The project started gaining life again in 1929, when the CNJ considered the work ready to start in 1931. The railroad, in the midst of completing projects in Cranford and Elizabeth of similar types, the railroad determined that Dunellen would be soon after. Involved in the construction would be two new depots for the borough (one westbound, one eastbound) and a chance to beautify North Avenue (NJ 28). By March 1935, the project proposal expanded to four grade crossings, including the ones at Grove Street and Pulaski Street. However, nothing came about of this until 1937, when the borough appeared at the State Highway Commission. Mayor Joseph Morecraft, Jr. and Councilman Edward J. Hannon would testify that the state should pay the money to remove the crossings, giving the borough financial assistance for the cause. Hannon noted the continued increase of accidents at the crossings and that the railroad is not responsible by law for doing such a thing.

The next attempt for eliminating the grade crossings came in 1943, when the Board of Public Utilities told the borough that the project was under consideration. The borough sent a communication letter to the board in June 1942 that they had been dealing with them since 1935 on such a project. The board stated that the project would cost $2.45 million (1943 USD), but that the project would have to be held for post-World War II consideration, along with many others. Lovecraft considered the letter a step in the right direction as it was written evidence that the cause was being considered. By April 1946, borough leaders had become anxious for the project to continue, and pressed the board to why a proposal for an elimination in Manville would be heard by the board, but not their request. In May 1946, the Board of Public Utilities Commissioners told the borough that they had no funds for the project. The project, whose cost now ballooned to $3.6 million (1946 USD), was 50% higher than the original total. The board noted that there were no federal funds available and no money in their budget. The board told Dunellen that any movement would not be in the immediate future.

In 1947, the borough sent two members of the planning board, Morecraft (now a freeholder for Middlesex County), and a secretary to a meeting of the State Planning Board at the Stacey–Trent Hotel in Trenton. The secretary, James Collins, noted that the project could continue with two of the now five grade crossings being eliminated (Washington and Prospect Avenues). Anxiety continued into 1948. At a continued standstill, new mayor Alvah Skinner approved a borough request in March 1948 to appeal to the Board of Public Utilities once again. This time, a committee chaired by Councilman William T. Piddington noted that the lack of a grade crossing removal has stifled economic development south of the tracks in Dunellen. However, the PUC declined citing that the railroad had a poor financial situation. Fed up residents in January 1949 began action with the Dunellen Lions Club handing out petitions to sign for the board to take up the Dunellen project. By March 11 the petition amassed 1,500 signatures from local residents fed up with the constant buck passing. Spokespeople from the Lions Club noted that the railroad causes Dunellen to lack in safety, business and expansion. They noted that every community between New York City and Bound Brook had their grade crossings and that Dunellen had the right to theirs. Meanwhile, Piddington considered an alternate option in August 1949 of widening Washington Avenue to four lanes to reduce the volume of traffic when trains ran at the crossing.

The voices of residents became louder in 1950. In March 1950, the Dunellen Planning Board and Middlesex County Planning Board came together and promised action. E.P. Wilkens, the chair of the County Planning Board, was told to relay this to his colleagues. Local resident J.Y. Wilson gave a proposal that Dunellen be presented in the most positive way possible to the Public Utilities Commissioners. However, other members also stated the best approach would be to continue to pressure the board. They felt that Dunellen had not done enough in terms of pressure on both the CNJ and the board to make progress. The Planning Boards also determined that the best cause of approach would be to elevate the tracks, rather than build a tunnel, as originally proposed in 1922. In April, the two boards agreed to a study for the removal of the grade crossings. James Collins, the chair of the local one, agreed that Wilkens and him agreed to the study. However, the prospects were looking dim again by early June, when the president of the CNJ sent a letter to the Middlesex County Planning Board that proposed instead of a grade crossing removal, just going with automatic gates. Mayor Albert Roff noted that the borough would oppose any proposal that was not complete grade elimination. Roff also noted that the study was still underway, and no changes would be proposed without sitting down with Dunellen representatives.

On June 20, 1950, the borough council joined the fight once again to continue the grade crossing elimination. The council offered to take the lead on the project, with the two Planning Boards willing to follow them. An agreement would be made to meet with the Public Utilities Commissioners once again, knowing that the CNJ now had the money for such a project. Residents continued to complain in 1950, when the Courier-News, a newspaper based in Plainfield, inquired with residents about the situation. By now, Morecraft stated that the Grove Street and Washington Avenue crossings were of utmost importance, despite the need to remove four of the crossings. Morecraft noted that the funding would be split mostly by the state of New Jersey and the railroad. However, by that point, the Board of Public Utilities Commissioners once again delayed any action.

=== Death of William Pangborn and action (April 1951) ===
At high noon on April 3, 1951, a CNJ drill train hit 17-year old William Pangborn, 15-year old Wilburn Forner, and Robert Reuter, killing Pangborn instantly. The three boys were at the Washington Avenue grade crossing, waiting to cross once a freight train heading westbound passed through. At the time of the accident, the three boys were standing between the tracks and the undermanned crossing gates. Reuter told the Dunellen Police Department that none of the boys heard the drill train on that track due to the loud noise of the freight train that passed through around the same time. The drill train, consisting of a locomotive and two freight cars, was on its way out of the nearby freight station. While the railroad men claimed the train was going only 4 miles per hour (6.4 km/h), there was speculation to the truthfulness about that due to Pangborn's death and Forner being injured when he was blindsided by the train. The train derailed after the accident, nearly striking a semaphore signal, and resulted in the crossing gates. Washington Avenue and the tracks were blocked for an hour while the car was rerailed around 1:10 pm (16:10 UTC).

Chief Joseph Tarpey of the Dunellen Police Department noted that the conductor and the engineer of the drill train told authorities that the drill train locomotive had no whistle. Tarpey stated that Reuter had told him that they heard no whistle from the drill train. Tarpey told the media that he questioned the grade crossing watchmen on duty, who had not heard anything of an accident. The upset chief noted that the fact that the railroad workers were only on the eastbound tower, making it impossible to see the teenagers on the westbound side. Tarpey asked the workers if they would remedy their actions by having more people staffed, in which they stated they would inquire with their bosses. However, the extra workers stationed at ground-level only work during rush hour (5–7 pm) on a daily basis. Tarpey also told the press that this accident was similar to one in 1942 when a 14-year old was struck by a train at the Pulaski Street crossing. Roff noted that the accident would continue to spur the battle for the elimination of the grade crossings and that he had spoken to Chief Tarpey about what to do about the situation.

Forner was taken to Muhlenberg Hospital in Plainfield with shock and injuries from the train, while Reuter telephoned his parents to take him home, uninjured but shocked. On April 6, Pangborn's funeral was held at Runyon's Funeral Home in Dunellen with family and classmates watching as the body of the Dunellen High School junior was taken out to the waiting hearst. Pangborn's body was brought to Lake Nelson Memorial Park.

Outrage over the accident was immediate. The Dunellen Lions Club, who amassed signatures for a petition in 1950, called an immediate meeting to deal with the problem on April 6. They told the press that the petition from 1950, affixed with over 2,200 signatures brought a letter from the Public Utilities Commissioners that stated they tabled the manner. The Lions Club also looked into the ideas of either building a crosswalk bridge, such as the one at Fanwood–Scotch Plains station or moving the station further east away from Washington Avenue. Meanwhile, Dunellen borough officials found out in a closed session on April 5 that the cost to build new elevated track system skyrocketed to $15 million. This new proposal included eliminating all the grade crossings in Dunellen (Washington, Prospect, Grove and Pulaski) along with Rock Road in Plainfield. This new project would be 85 percent funded by the state of New Jersey with the railroad chipping in the final 15 percent. A. C. Tosh, the vice president of the CNJ told the borough officials that they are in support of removing the grade crossings through Dunellen and would support the borough in their demands.

Meanwhile, the railroad also informed that they would look at changing the approach of freight trains coming through the area. Previously the trains would depart a roundhouse in Dunellen involving a crossover track near the Washington Avenue crossing. The roundhouse, just east of Washington Avenue, fueled about 20 trains a day that would block Washington and Prospect Avenue's grade crossings. However, the trains that were stored at the roundhouse also had 12 cars on average in the back, which would cause the trains to be so long when backing up that the trains reached the Grove Street crossing. As a result, the Washington Avenue crossing would be blocked for as much as 17 minutes at a time in the early morning, causing traffic tie-ups. Chief Tarpey told the railroad and the borough that it is in violation of state law, which allowed no more than a five-minute blockage. In response, the railroad would consider moving the crossover track to the east of Washington Avenue in order to prevent this. At the same time, the borough requested that watchman be on site during the time when schools let out to ensure safe crossing.

Dunellen officials sent a letter to Governor Alfred E. Driscoll for their assistance, noting the lack of progress since 1948, when the borough was told that no money was available. Roff, Morecraft, Collins, Tarpey and Dunellen High School Principal Walter A. Miller, Jr. all attended the meeting, where Roff noted that a public meeting would be held on April 9 at the school about what to do. At that meeting, Roff hoped that residents would sign a new petition to be sent to the Public Utilities Commissioners. Residents also complained that the schools should make sure there were adequate items of food available at the cafeteria so students would not have to go home for lunch (as the three students were doing at the time of the accident) or that Dunellen police were on hand to ensure their safety at grade crossings. The Dunellen Parent-Teacher Association noted that they would also attend the next borough council meeting to ensure the safety of the students.

On April 6, the Dunellen Elks Club demanded a grand jury investigation about the railroad accident, including a resolution that the borough continued to protest the lack of action on the parts of the state and the railroad. The resolution continued that they would demand the aid of Driscoll and the railroad to eliminate the crossings that they considered a hazard to public safety to pedestrians and vehicles. The resolution also demanded that the Middlesex County Prosecutors Office lead the approach for a grand jury, and that this resolution would be sent to the railroad, the state, the governor and the Prosecutors Office. As part of supporting it, the Lions Club agreed to send demands to Middlesex County members of the New Jersey State Assembly and New Jersey State Senate. Mayor Roff noted that at least 20 organizations had signed the grand jury resolution and the borough would go farther if the Middlesex County Prosecutors Office did not listen to demands. Roff stated that if they were ignored, they would send a group to the office in New Brunswick and demand it.

By April 9, no response had been received from Driscoll and the Plainfield Courier-News wrote a long piece on the history of the problem in Dunellen. In that piece, the newspaper reported that a proposal did exist 40 years prior to the accident in raising the tracks similar to the tracks through nearby Middlesex borough. This involved a proposal establishing a bridge over Washington and Prospect Avenues. However, this never occurred. At the same time, they outlined the accident in 1942 which cost the child on his bicycle his life at the ungated Pulaski Street crossing along with an accident in 1949 when a soldier tried to crawl between two stopped freight cars and had his leg cut off in the process. Another problem with the crossings was also about to occur with the reopening of Camp Kilmer. With the camp reopening, more military vehicles would be required to use the grade crossings in Dunellen, fueled by a traffic light at the junction with North Avenue (Route 28). The newspaper also noted that the nearby Art Color Printing Company fueled a lot of traffic at the crossings when workers left work for the day. Civilian officials noted that the effectiveness of officials in case of a disaster would be limited due to the grade crossings.

At the public hearing on April 9, Roff backed up his demands, noting that a group of citizens would be attending the Public Utilities Commission hearing. Roff also stated that he would form a group of citizens to head to Trenton if their voices were not being heard. The Parent-Teacher Association demanded that Miller and the Dunellen Board of Education deal with a way to figure out how Whittier School students do not have to cross the railroad tracks. Another resident, George Block, noted that the borough should be ready to press the railroad to force a 30 mph speed limit of trains through Dunellen. Someone in the audience suggested a wooden bridge over the tracks, but this was declined due to the possibility of students falling from the bridge. A child also noted that on her way to school, the watchmen would also let them around the gates when the 8 am train is sitting at the crossing.

=== Public hearings and approval (May 1951–June 1952) ===
On May 7, Roff approved an emergency appropriation of $1,000 (1951 USD) to study the grade crossings in Dunellen in order to get the data necessary for another appeal to the Commissioners. Each crossing would be studied for 18 hours a day. They would study the amount of traffic at each of the crossings (car, truck and pedestrian) and then they would have 10 days to report to council. Roff stated that he felt the tide was shifting in the borough's favor with a decision coming quick. In the meantime, James Markle, a fellow councilman reported that he and the police department were succeeding to have the police stationed at the North and Prospect Avenue intersection to meet students of the Whittier School for safe crossing of the tracks. Walter Miller, who supported the proposal, also was helping with the cause by stationing himself at the intersection. The police and Miller also enforced the end of jaywalking and the high school students supported the cause and ceased doing so.

By June 19, the borough was set up with the data for a hearing with the Public Utilities Commissioners set for June 27. Roff presented the Dunellen Borough Council a booklet for the presentation, which included the previous 25 years of accidents, including 11 deaths, at the grade crossings. Roff also announced a public hearing in advance of the state hearing for June 22, when they would present this to the public. The hearing would involve the crossing elimination committee appointed by the mayor. This included Morecraft, Miller, Piddington, Markle and borough attorney Henry Handelman. The hearing with the Commissioners would be held in Newark at 11 am on June 27 at 1060 Broad Street. The day before the meeting with the Commissioners, Middlesex County Prosecutor Matthew Melko announced that no criminal actions would be filed against the railroad for the April 3 accident. Melko noted that the students were in their location illegally, leading to that decision.

One June 27, the hearing was held with Roff, Miller, new Police Chief Norman Schuyler, Fire Chief Walter Runyon and members of the borough council in attendance. Handelman handled the case from the view of the Roff-appointed committee on the crossings. Schuyler told the Commissioners about a time when they were held at the crossing for 23 minutes on their way to a man injured in a local factory. Miller's approach involved talking about how over 1,600 children use the crossing each day to get to and from school. Runyon noted that the police had no ability to continue to handling the 250 feet of backups involved with each train movement. Schuyler also noted that a police officer had to detour all the way to Clinton Avenue in Plainfield just to get to an emergency due to the tie-ups. Morecraft and Wilkens also testified on behalf of the borough. The Commissioners decided to hold another meeting on September 26 in which they would have studied all the data, details and plans for elimination. At that meeting, representatives of the CNJ would also be present with plans. At the next Borough Council meeting on July 2, Roff noted that he was pleased with the decision of the Commissioners to continue to study the data and hoped that the railroad and the borough agreed on plans by the September 26 meeting.

However, on October 1, 1951, Roff addressed the borough council that the meeting was postponed from September 26 to November 14. On November 14, the meeting was held, where a proposal was outlined by the railroad. The new proposal, costing $6 million (down from $15 million), would eliminate all four grade crossings in Dunellen and the Rock Road crossing in Plainfield. Doing this would build a proper grade for a span of 3 miles (4.8 km) from Mountain Avenue in Middlesex Borough to the Clinton Avenue station. The tracks would be raised 16 feet (4.9 m) from the at-grade level and the roads would be depressed 3 feet (0.91 m), resulting in the creation of 14.6 feet (4.5 m) clearances for vehicle traffic. Grove and Pulaski Streets would be barricaded rather than given their own underpasses, like Washington and Prospect Avenues. The railroad would also move the location of the Dunellen train yard. Roff stated at the hearing that they were in agreement with the railroad on the plans. The railroads would continue hearings on December 12.

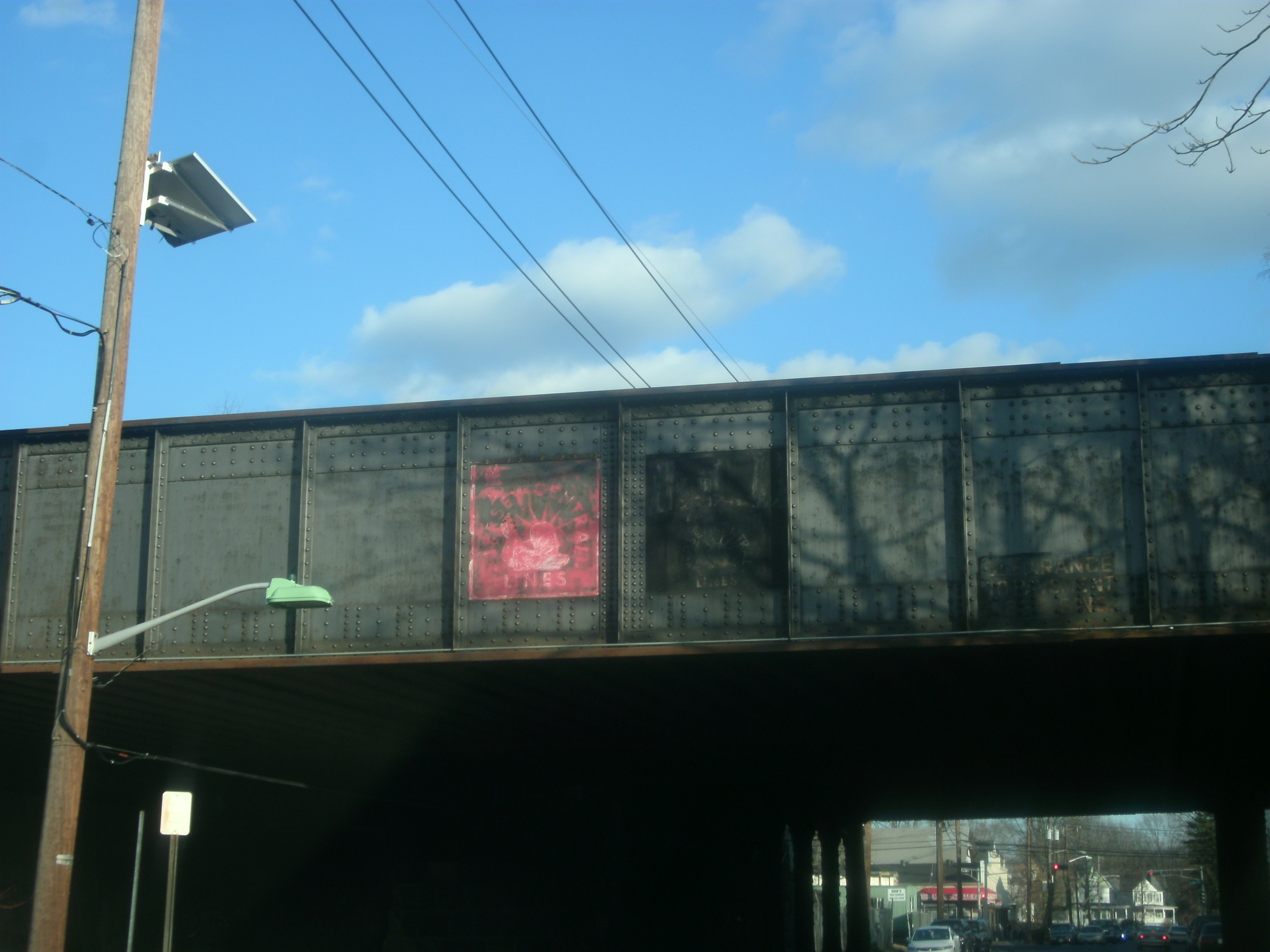
The Richmond Street bridge in Plainfield, the point of contention for the city

However, this meeting was postponed until February 6, 1952, because of a Plainfield complaint about having to build an extra bridge to facilitate train storage for two extra tracks. The CNJ President, Earl Moore noted that in order to work on the elimination of the Dunellen grade crossings, they would need to expand the Plainfield freight yard for passenger cars. This would mean construction of an extra bridge over Richmond Street in Plainfield for two ior more extra tracks in order to facilitate the yard expansion. The railroad would not build a new roundhouse as the diesel engines would be stored outside and there would be no car servicing. The proposal noted that there was room for the extra tracks without needing extra land. The railroad and the city agreed that a new bridge could be built across Richmond Street at a later date to replace the older one.

However, the February 6 meeting also met a postponement. This time, the railroad wanted approval to reduce services at the Dunellen, Grant Avenue and Clinton Avenue stations because of the yard expansion. Due to this, 11 trains would now begin at Plainfield station. The second proposal dealt with the Richmond Street bridge, an 80 feet (24 m) long structure with a 14 feet (4.3 m) clearance. The request was made to widen the existing bridge or else a traffic bottleneck would be created at Richmond Street that would be hazardous to the safety of drivers. The Plainfield group also changed their request mid-discussion, adding all bridges within the city. Despite objections from Dunellen, the Commissioners determined that the Plainfield group had the right to be heard.

The new hearing, held on February 20, noted Plainfield's objection to the reduction of service (now seven trains) to their Grant Avenue and Clinton Avenue stations. (Dunellen had approved the reduction in trains.) The railroad and the PUC noted that if it was that big of an issue, that trains that express pass Dunellen and Grant Avenue stations could stop there to make up for the lost trains. The CNJ also noted that they investigated moving the yard west of Dunellen, but was too expensive. Plainfield objected, stating that constructing the new bridge would cost $230,000 (1952 USD), $23,000 less than building a new yard and constructing a new bridge at Richmond Street. After the objection, the PUC adjourned to make a decision on the matter.

On June 19, 1952, the Board of Public Utilities Commissioners approved the decision for the elevation of tracks through Dunellen. This new project, which would cost $6.7 million and take three years, would have to be finished by June 1955. In addition to the abandonment of the Dunellen railroad yard, the new railroad design would allow for two elevated platforms at Dunellen station. Rock Road in Plainfield would also have a 14.6 feet (4.5 m) high clearance. The railroad was ordered to not curtail any service to the three stations, and the proposal for wider bridges through the city of Plainfield was denied. The Richmond Street bridge, however, was approved. The railroad was ordered to bring the board contract forms, construction plans, and contract documents by February 28, 1953. Roff responded to the announcement, thanking everyone, including his deceased predecessor Alvah Skinner, for their work towards the goal of eliminating the grade crossings in Dunellen. He noted that traffic going through the crossings, amounting to 8,800 on average daily, would no longer have to deal with all the backups.

=== Construction (June 1952–1955) ===
In approving the grade crossing elimination project, the Public Utilities Commissioners and the railroad assured that they had enough funds to pay the $6.7 million needed. As originally proposed, the state would fund 85 percent and the railroad would pay the final 15 percent. They noted that they had to decline a project in Passaic to do the same thing because it would have wiped their budget. The only concern would be a steel industry strike or military use for steel, which was an unknown. At the same time, the railroad abandoned the extra guards at the crossing that had been there since after the accident. In October, the CNJ demolished the roundhouse in Dunellen, constructed in the 1870s, due to the increased use of diesel engines by the railroad.

In March 1953, the CNJ and the borough of Dunellen came together to work on selling the site of the railroad depot. The railroad wanted to sell the site for private development and let out bids in March. The high bid was $83,150 from William Piness of Plainfield. Representing a group of investors from Passaic, Piness wanted to use the site, right now a parking lot, for construction of a series of one-level commercial buildings. The land being offered also had a Sunoco gasoline station and a building for Dunellen Taxi. Roff and Collins met with the railroad on the land, given the right to refuse the offer. The borough officials felt the land would be better served for developers as the borough did not have enough money to purchase the land outright.

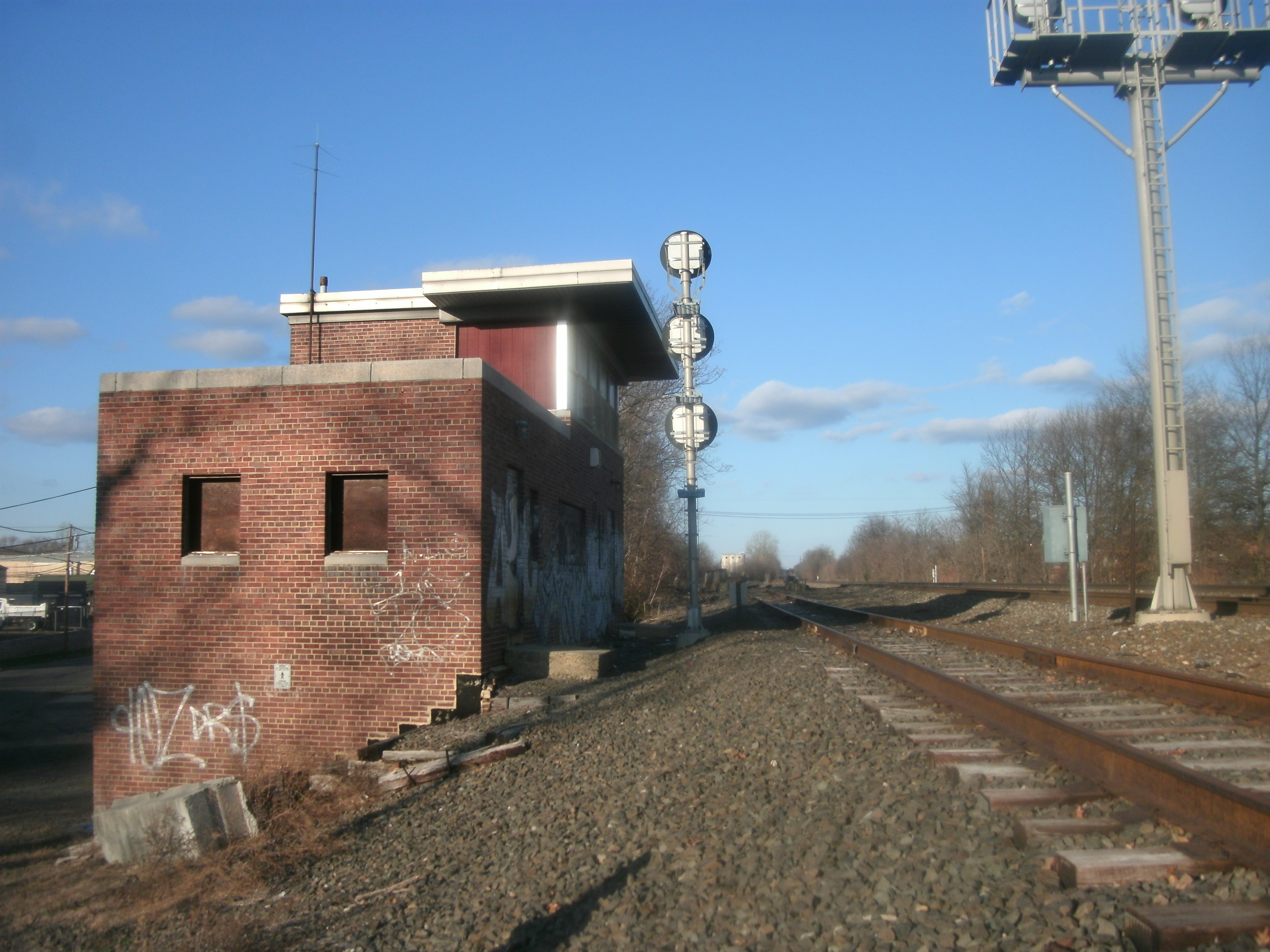
Queen Tower in Plainfield, the signal tower built in 1953

In late March, the state sent out bids for a new signal tower in Plainfield. With bids due by April 23, the new structure would be a three-story brick tower with dimensions of 17'x40'. The new tower's proposals would be available on March 30 to make bids with. In April, the city of Plainfield issued a permit to construct a new signal tower for the yard in Plainfield. Located at 411–413 Cottage Place, the new structure would cost $30,000 (1953 USD). The tower construction began in August, replacing the tower at Berckman Street in Plainfield.

In July, J.F. Chapman and Son, Inc. began work to construct the grading and filling from Middlesex Borough to Plainfield for the new tracks of a temporary main line for the CNJ. This new mainline would be three tracks, with the contractor receiving 97¢ per cubic yard of filling and 79¢ per yard of excavating. In August, the Construction Service Company of Middlesex took the bids on constructing the new bridge over Richmond Street. The steel work was contracted out to Bethlehem Steel and construction would begin in September. By this point, the new grading was finished for the new passenger yard in Plainfield, which was nearing completion By September, the works for a new eastbound station depot in Dunellen were still in the design phase with the construction to begin around April 1954. No guarantees were made for a new station on the westbound side of the tracks.

On January 5, 1954, Chief Schuyler noted that Washington Avenue would be closed to traffic that day and on January 6 between the Art Company and North Avenue for workers to install a temporary right-of-way for trains to get through. Joseph Morecraft, taking back over as mayor in 1954, fielded complaints about lack of parking with the construction, but stated that he expected patience with the construction going on as a temporary inconvenience. He also noted that the borough was looking at buying the lot on the south side of the tracks for a new parking lot. On February 23, the railroad got permission from Plainfield to begin construction of a new bridge over Rock Road, with a slated construction beginning in October 1954.

On February 16, 1954, the New Jersey Superior Court heard the lawsuits of the Pangborn and Forner families versus the CNJ. The families were looking for $145,000 combined in their lawsuits. Testifying on behalf of the family included William Forner, who stated that his injuries affected his schooling. On February 18, Judge Ralph S. Smalley awarded $22,800 total to the two families for victim compensation, in favor of the railroad. As a result, the Pangborns got $15,000 while the Forners got $7,800 for the injuries and legal fees. Despite the plaintiff's attorney, Stanley Greenfield, arguing that the railroad should have given proper warning to the oncoming drill train, the judge agreed with the kids being illegally within the gates.

In May 1954, the signal tower for the Dunellen passenger car yard, built in 1905 and located between Rock and Washington Avenues, was razed for the project. By that point, the temporary tracks were almost complete. In June, the railroad handed out a contract to J.F. Chapman and Sons, totaling $584,770 to do the grading and filling for the new right-of-way through Middlesex, Dunellen and Plainfield after constructing the original temporary right-of-way. They also handed out a contract to Construction Service Company to build the abutments, culverts, walls and bridges for the new crossings. This contract totaled $1,095,400. On September 1, the Rock Avenue crossing was closed for the construction, followed by the Washington Avenue crossing on September 8. Both were to remain closed until the construction of new bridges were complete. Once the Washington Avenue project would finish, the Prospect Avenue crossing would close.

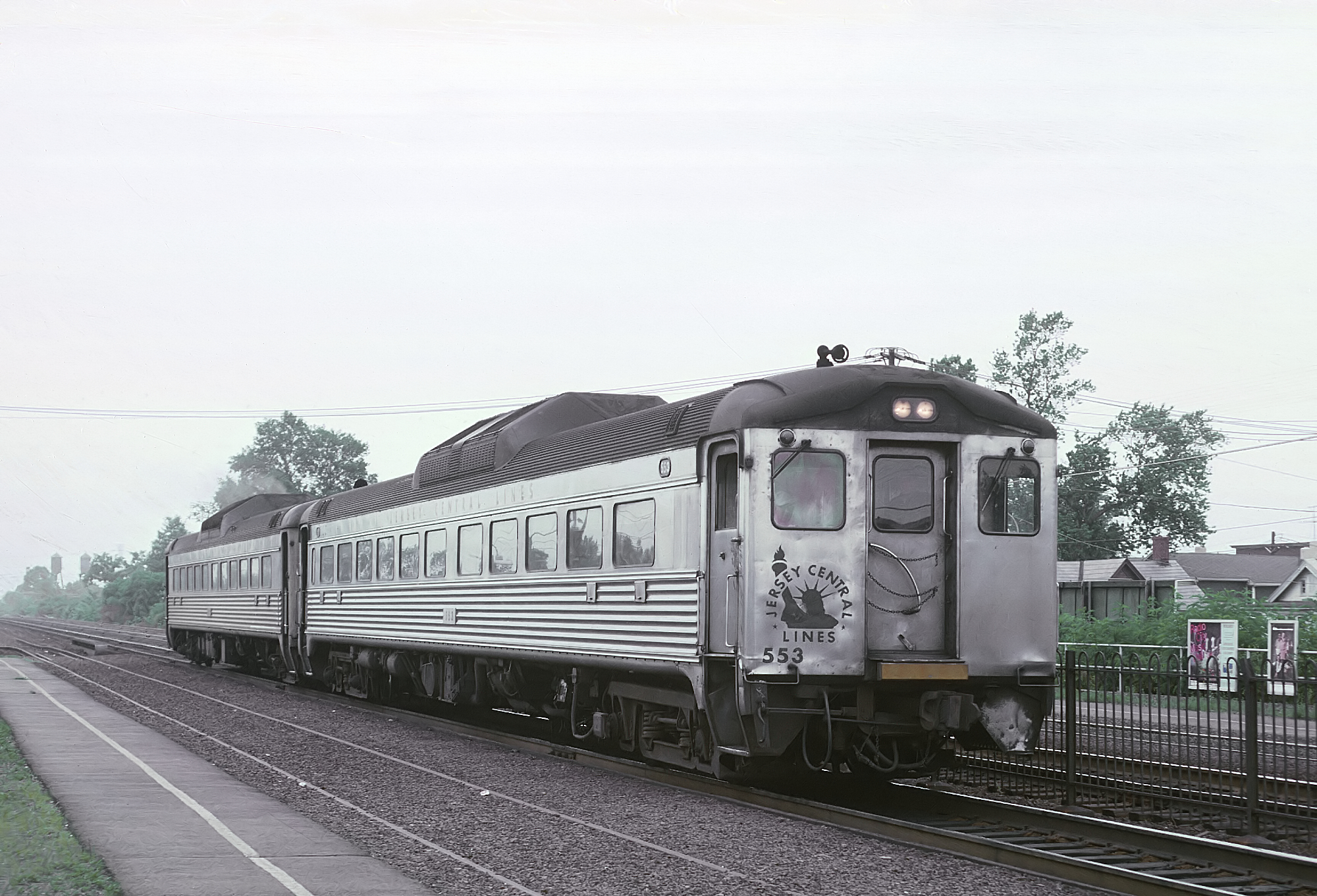
A CNJ Budd RDC at Dunellen station on July 4, 1969

The first 60,000-pound (27,000 kg) girder for the new railroad bridge at Washington Avenue went in on September 13. At that point, they announced two of the new tracks would go into service after November 15, with construction on the third track starting in March 1955 and being finished by June 1, 1955. On January 24, 1955, the first train, a Raritan Clocker, crossed the Washington Avenue bridge and entered Dunellen station. By this point, basic work on all five grade crossings were complete enough for train service. The railroad, state and local dignitaries held a banquet for the occasion on the trip to Raritan station. However, regular trains would not begin using the new tracks for two weeks as the railroad had to continue to install switches, which was being hampered by the weather. They noted that when the switches were done, the westbound and center tracks would be removed from grade-level completely, leaving the eastbound ones only. The full tracks were opened on March 3 with the Raritan Clocker, with the intent to rip up the old rails in September. On September 29, 1955, the railroad closed the grade crossings through Dunellen and Plainfield. By this point, the new railroad station in Dunellen was 75 percent completed, with the intent that a fourth track would be graded in.

On December 3, the railroad announced that the new station in Dunellen would open on December 10. The old depot, considered a fire hazard, would be replaced by a new elevated structure. The railroad planned a new gala for the opening of the station with Morecraft among the dignitaries at the celebration. On December 10, Morecraft cut the ceremonial ribbon to open the station, which was attended by 100 people and the Dunellen High School band. The new station had a tunnel between the westbound and eastbound structures, along with a ticket office and restrooms in the eastbound depot. Morecraft informed the crowd that the paving would be completed in January 1956, with the Rock Avenue bridge included. Despite that, the announcement was made by the railroad on December 11 that the Washington Avenue underpass would open on December 16. However, Morecraft noted on December 14 that the Prospect Avenue underpass would not be completed until Christmas Eve of 1955.

== Station layout ==
The station has two low-level side platforms serving two tracks. The inbound platform is 398 feet (121 m) long while the outbound platform is 399 feet (122 m) long; both can accommodate four cars.

== Bibliography ==
- Bernhart, Benjamin L. (2004). Historic Journeys By Rail: Central Railroad of New Jersey Stations, Structures & Marine Equipment. Outer Station Project. ISBN 1891402072.
- Bianculli, Anthony J. (2001). Trains and Technology: Track and Structures. University of Delaware Press. ISBN 9780874138023.
