= Finderne station =

Railway station in Finderne, New Jersey

Coordinates: 40.55982°N 74.58073°W

Finderne
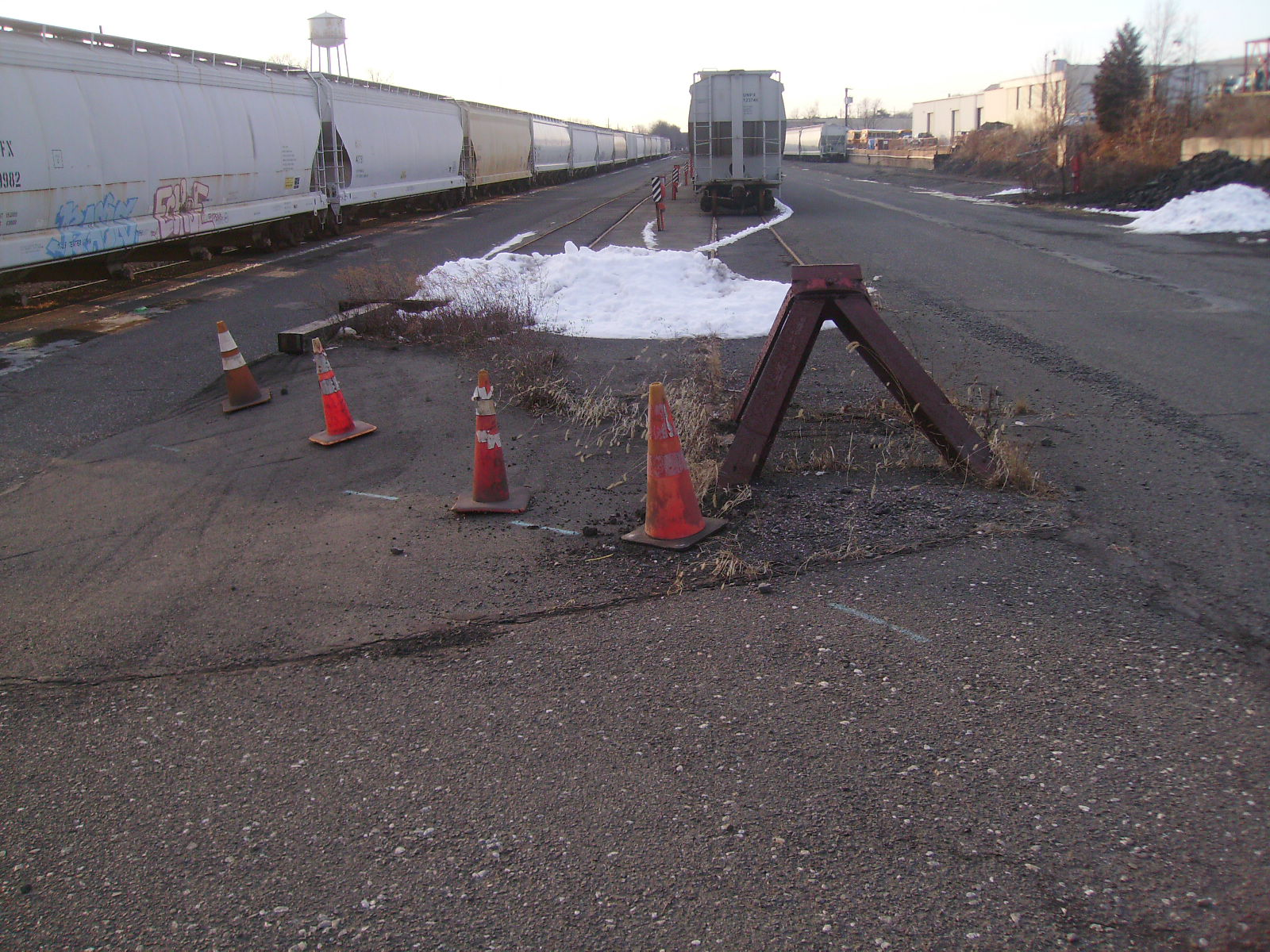
- The former site of the Finderne station during sunset in January 2010.

General information
- Location: Finderne Avenue (County Route 533) between South and Central Avenues, Finderne, Bridgewater Township, New Jersey
- Owner: New Jersey Transit
- Platforms: None
- Tracks: 2

Other information
- Fare zone: 16

History
- Opened: 1851
- Closed: 1854; October 29, 2006 (second time)
- Rebuilt: 1868
- Former names: Dunn's Landing/Dunn's (1851–1854); Manville (October 1912–November 1912); Manville–Finderne

Key dates
- 1970: Station agent eliminated
- 1972: Station depot demolished

Former services
Preceding station	NJ Transit	Following station
Somerville toward High Bridge	Raritan Valley Line	Bridgewater toward Newark Penn or New York
Preceding station	Central Railroad of New Jersey	Following station
Somerville Terminus	Somerville – Jersey City Local	Bound Brook toward Jersey City
Location

Finderne is a defunct commuter railroad station in the Finderne section of Bridgewater Township, Somerset County, New Jersey. Located in a yard west of the Finderne Avenue (County Route 533), the station serviced trains of NJ Transit's Raritan Valley Line between High Bridge station in Hunterdon County and Newark Penn Station. At the end of service, Finderne station was devoid of any facilities and consisted of just a stop in the yard with access points to both sides from Finderne Avenue. No platforms or parking lots existed for the station. At the time of the station's closure, Finderne station only had three trains stop, two afternoon eastbound trains and one westbound train in the morning.

Railroad service began with the opening of the Elizabethtown and Somerville Railroad to Somerville on January 1, 1842. A station stop known as Dunn's Landing, later Dunn's, opened in the area of modern-day Finderne c. 1851. That station was eliminated c. 1854. The Central Railroad of New Jersey built a new station depot at the renamed Finderne in 1868. In October 1912, with the construction of a new plant for the Johns Manville corporation, the railroad renamed the station to Manville, resulting in complaints from local residents. Hoping to push back some anger, the railroad renamed the station to Manville–Finderne in November 1912, though local quarreling over the name would remain until August 1913. The railroad eliminated the station agent in 1970 and demolished the station depot in 1972. NJ Transit closed the station on October 29, 2006 after declined use and services.

== History ==
Railroad service in the area of modern-day Finderne began with the construction of the Elizabethtown and Somerville Railroad, opening on January 1, 1842 to Somerville. Around 1851, a station stop was established at Dunn's Landing, a small community east of Somerville. By 1853, this station name had been abbreviated to just Dunn's. By 1854, it had vanished from the timetables entirely. Historical records of Dunn's Landing are limited and it was believed that the area that would become Finderne was once Dunn's Landing. The name "Finderne" was to be the creation of a Hessian soldier who would talk about a girl near his camp. With this soldier's thick accent, the phrase "the fine girl" would sound like "fina durne". One rumor was that the name Finderne was created by Philemon Dunn, of which the area was named. A new station house was built in Finderne in 1868 alongside a new station at Dunellen as part of improvements and installation of a third track by the Central Railroad of New Jersey, which had taken over operations.

During the 1900s, New Jersey State Senator Joseph S. Frelinghuysen Sr. (R–Somerset) learned from friends at the H.W. Johns–Manville Company, an asbestos, electrical and paint concern that they had interest in moving their facilities out of Brooklyn and into a new location in New Jersey. Company officials had a meeting and tour around Somerville with the local Board of Trade. Charles Brayton Manville, an executive with the company, was impressed by the options Somerville provided and their favorability towards a new factory. Litigation with officials over the Brooklyn facilities held up decision making, but by November 1911, the proceedings had ended and the company was in final discussions to build a new plant in New Jersey. This new factory would have access to three local railroads (the Central Railroad of New Jersey, the Lehigh Valley Railroad and the Reading Railroad) and a large water supply from the Raritan River to help operate the facility.

The company decided that they would build this new factory at Finderne and were looking at purchasing three separate farms, owned by Cyrus Peterson, Bernard Mayer and John Groendyke. The Peterson and Groendyke farms would be taken in their entireties while the Mayer farm would lose a portion of its land. The tract designed from the tree farms involved 200 acres (81 ha) of land, which would provide for the plant and 600 houses to serve as a factory town. By December 12, negotiations had been completed to make the move from Brooklyn to Finderne, including agreements on acquisition of the necessary land. The cost for the new factory would be $2,000,000. The board of directors at the company approved the transactions on an unanimous vote before an expiration date of January 1 on the agreements.

With the plant coming, mass investment in the area was made immediately. The Bound Brook Realty Investment Company was organized for the construction of the factory town around the new facility in February 1912. The Somerville Board of Trade wanted to ensure its involvement in construction of the neighborhood by working to purchase stock in the new firm. Competing against officials from Bound Brook with the same interest, both municipalities wanted to be the host of the new factory town for employees of H.W. Johns–Manville. Officials in the Finderne area were also interested in having the community and questioned both municipalities' involvement.

The railroad was also excited for the construction of the new plant in Finderne. William George Besler, the vice president and general manager of the Central Railroad of New Jersey, praised the project at a meeting of the Bound Brook Board of Trade on February 29, 1912. With the new plant, Besler expected that they would be building a new siding directly to the new plant and that it would lead to Bound Brook station getting redone by 1913. He added that the tracks would need to be raised by 7 feet (2.1 m) to prevent flooding from high water conditions in Bound Brook from the Raritan River. Within a week, the railroad sent several engineers to survey the new siding location for the plant. The Lehigh Valley Railroad installed their own switch to help with the new factory in April 1912.

Contracts for some of the plant were awarded by late April 1912 to begin construction of the new facility, with the expectation that the paper mill they were building would open by October 1. With construction underway, workers had to exhume 14 bodies that had been buried on John Groendyke's farm, which were decomposed to the point of just skeletons. Each one was placed into a box and moved to a cemetery where headstones would be installed to commemorate the deceased. ' Concrete foundations and grading were complete by late June, when officials and laborers with the American Bridge Company arrived on the property to help work on construction of the plant. It was also announced that plans were being laid out to place a trolley line to the factory and that the grade crossing next to the Finderne station would be eliminated in favor of a bridge over the tracks, designed similar to a bridge in Bound Brook. By July, the Bound Brook Improvement and Investment Company had been working on developing the new factory town for Johns–Manville plant. Located south of the tracks, the new community would be named Manville. At that point, expectation was that the new factory would be finished by November. The new community would have 321 lots sold for workers to reside in and the Central Railroad of New Jersey agreed to provide a station at the new community for people to use.

By the end of August, much of the ironwork had been completed on the factory and all three railroads were at work in the Finderne and Bound Brook areas on improvements to facilities. The Central Railroad of New Jersey focused on building new switches from Bound Brook to Somerville for the new siding, a process replicated by the Reading Railroad. A contractor from Somerville, Richards and Gaston, worked on digging out the excavation work for a new bridge at Finderne station, taking the grade crossing and raising it 12 feet (3.7 m) over the tracks via a new bridge. The new trolley line, which would run to Manville as well, would cross the new bridge. Dirt from excavation at Finderne would be moved to Bound Brook, where they would use it to elevate the tracks over the Raritan River, as planned. The Central Railroad of New Jersey and Lehigh Valley Railroad announced construction of a new union station at Bound Brook at the cost of $150,000.

In a gesture of respect to the Johns–Manville Company, the Central Railroad of New Jersey changed the name of the Finderne station to Manville in October 1912. They requested that the United States Postal Service follow accordingly to change the name of the post office. The change of the name to Manville caused consternation locally. Bernard Mayer, who sold some of his farm for the project, stated that his cattle were registered under the Finderne name and that he would lose money with the change in name. Another local who lived with Mayer stated that the name was sufficient before the factory and did not understand why the name needed to be changed to drop Finderne entirely. The Shaw family, who owned the estate once owned by the Finderne family, opposed the name change as well. Residents filed a petition with the Somerset County Clerk's office to oppose the change of the name. By the beginning of November, the railroad looked at appeasing the angry locals by renaming the station "Finderne and Manville". The upset residents contacted United States Senator James E. Martine about the name change, requesting him to push the Postmaster General to retain the name of Finderne instead of changing the post office to Manville.

The aggravation over the proposed name changes came to an end in August 1913 with the construction of a new church in the area. The Shaw family donated land for the new church and a cornerstone at the building would be named Finderne. The railroads (Central Railroad of New Jersey and the Lehigh Valley Railroad) would use Manville in their station names whle the post office would retain the Finderne name.

== See also ==
- List of New Jersey Transit stations

== Bibliography ==
- Bernhart, Benjamin L. (2004). Historic Journeys By Rail: Central Railroad of New Jersey Stations, Structures & Marine Equipment. Outer Station Project. ISBN 1891402072.
