= Port Liberté, Jersey City =

Populated place in Hudson County, New Jersey, US

Coordinates: 40.685649°N 74.07154°W

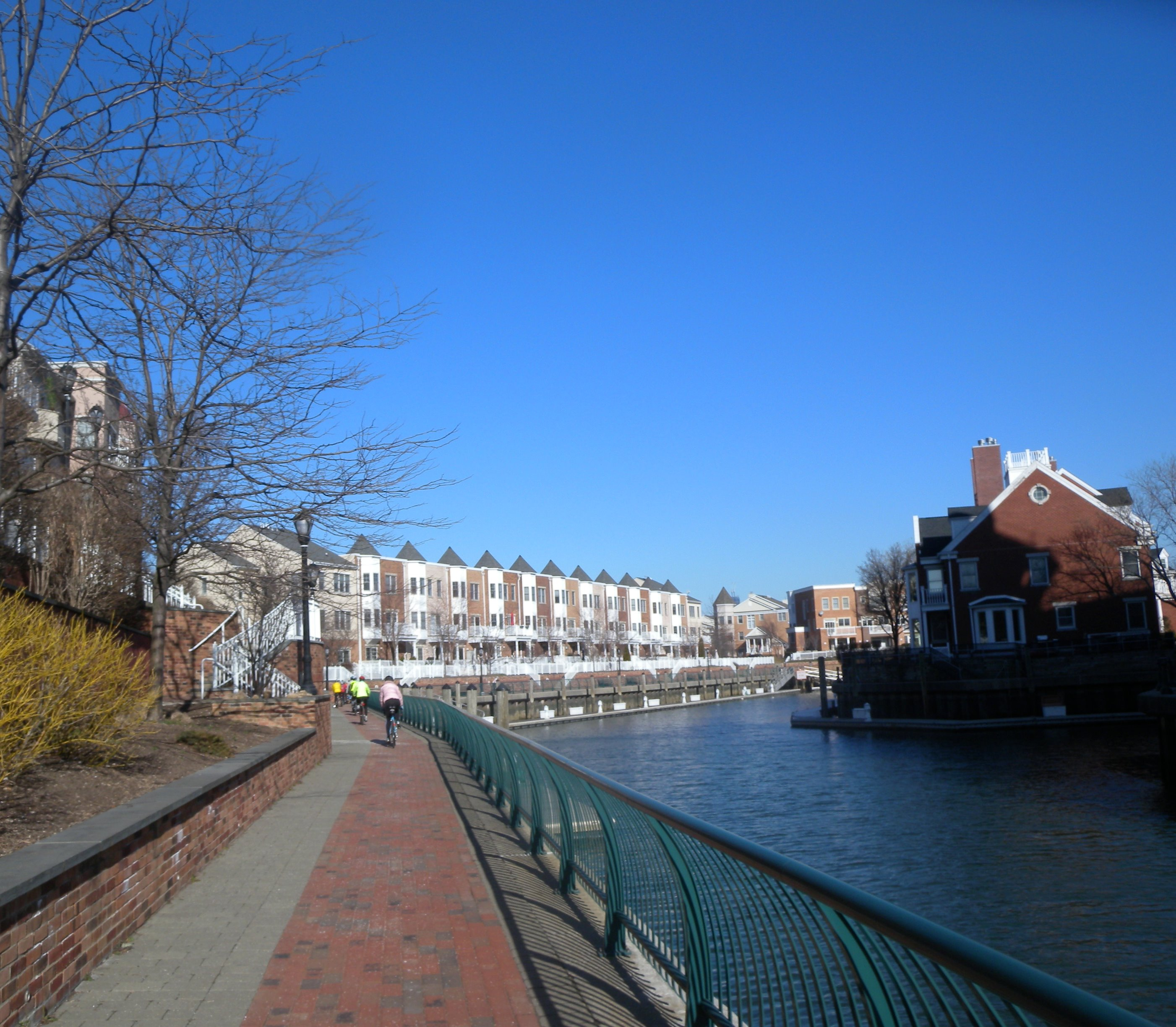
Condos, canal and HRWW

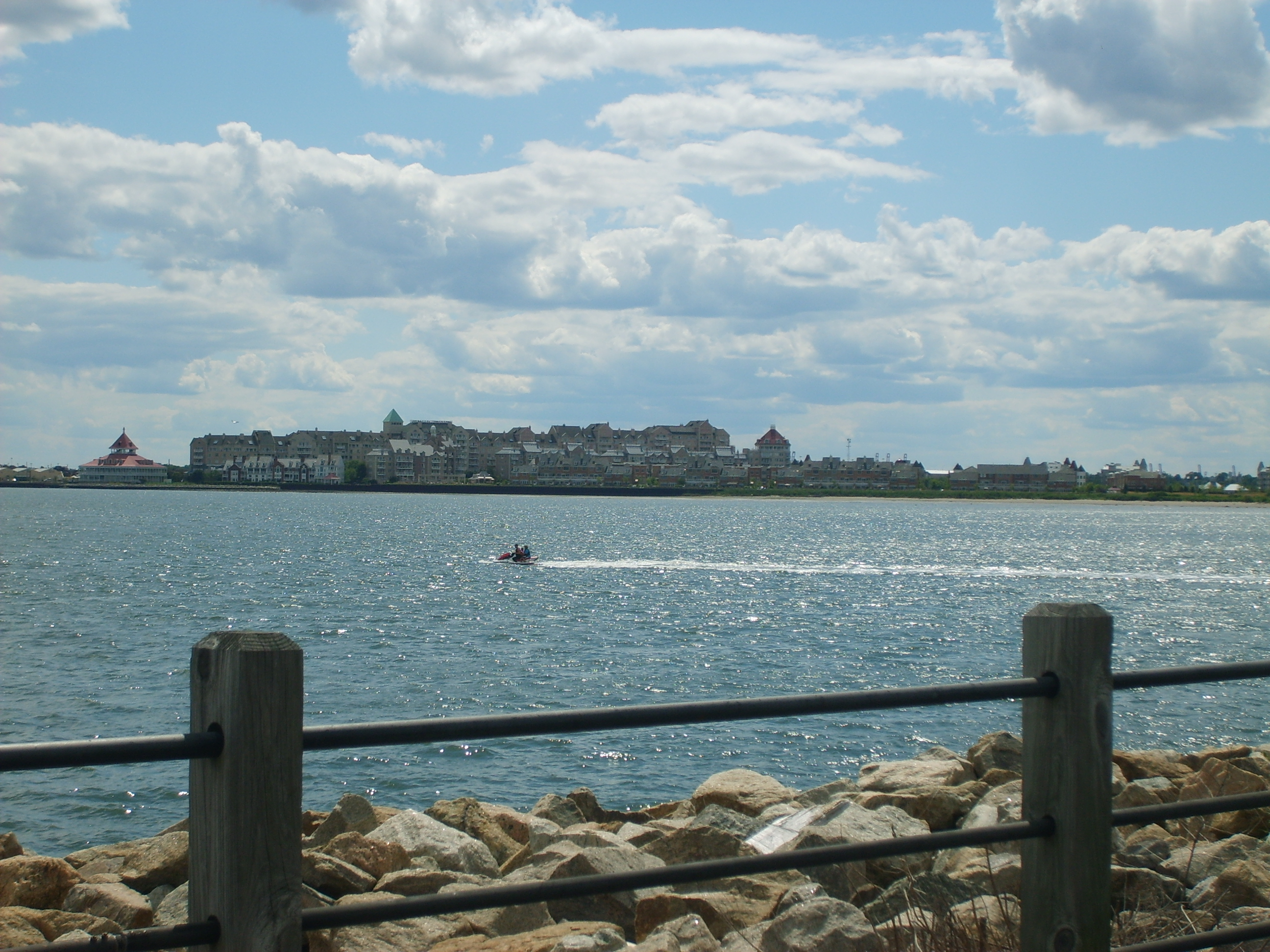
Port Liberte from Liberty State Park.

Port Liberté is a section of Jersey City located on Caven Point, formerly one of the last natural sand beaches on the Upper New York Bay. The community is a European style village located along the western side of Upper New York Bay. The community has canals, gardens, playgrounds, and a restaurant. The many luxury condominiums and townhouses offer views of Manhattan and the Statue of Liberty. In addition, many of the residences have canals on the back making the village perfect for boating. Many of the canals are also lined with walkways, gardens, and docks. The Liberty National Golf Club and the Caven Point section of Liberty State Park neighbor the development on the north and east respectively, and are accessible via the Hudson River Waterfront Walkway.

== Transportation ==
NY Waterway-operated ferries travel to Pier 11/Wall Street in Manhattan on weekdays during the morning and evening commuter periods.

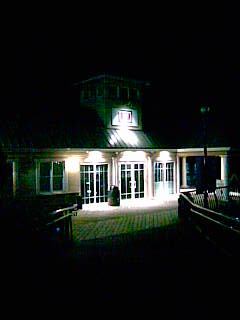
Port Liberte's NY Waterway terminal at night.

The 981 Port Liberte-Grove Street bus used to serve the area before it was discontinued on May 29, 2010. The development owners have expanded their own shuttle service in response.

Jersey City took over ownership and operations of the ferry terminal in 2023. Upon taking control of operations, the city partially subsidized the original fare from $13 to $8.

== Hancock House ==
Port Liberté was built on the site of a house, named the Hancock House, that was visited by General Marquis de Lafayette during the Revolutionary War to spy on British troops in New York City. The house was demolished some time in the 20th century.

== History ==
The new set of real estate was designed by François Spoerry, a French architect, who invented the concept of "soft architecture", that would prefigure new urbanism. He developed the concept at Port Grimaud, a waterfront project in Saint-Tropez, France, and attempted to adapt it at Port Liberté.

Commenced in the 1980s, this European-style mixed-use complex planned for 2,280 residential units, a 245-boat slip marina, 590 canal boat slips, 350-room hotel, a 46,000-square-foot (4,300 m^{2}) office building, retail/commercial spaces recreation facilities, a health club and a yacht club. However, the complexity of the design, the costly canal engineering and the collapse of Wall Street in the late 1980s drove the project to bankruptcy. Only 37 town homes and 363 of the planned residential units are completed. Joseph Barry of the Applied Company based at Hoboken, New Jersey took it over, abandoned the canal plan and completed Phase 1 and Phase 2 of construction in early 2000s.

In 2018, permits were applied for a permit to build 284 units by Toll Brothers. In 2019, the city approved the construction of a five-story building with 400 units, as well as another plan to build four-story townhouses with 69 units, both under Toll Brothers. However, by 2021, the deal had fallen through, a new application was submitted by Ironstate Development for the construction of a five-story building with 401 units and a seven-story 602-space parking garage, being almost identical to the previously approved Toll Brothers building. In 2022, the city approved Ironstate Development's plan for the apartment building. In 2023, construction of the new building began.

In 2025, to fill the remaining ten acres of land in Port Liberté, Putle Homes proposed a 168-unit townhouse complex consisting of 19 four-story buildings in called Liberty Watch. The complex would have 336 parking spaces for residents and 80 additional street spots, as well as 168 bicycle parking spaces. The plan has significantly less units than the allowed 512 units, which was reportedly due to being more aesthetically pleasing and to adhere to NJDEP flood hazard requirements and stormwater rules.
