= Grove Street station (PATH) =

Port Authority Trans-Hudson rail station

Grove Street
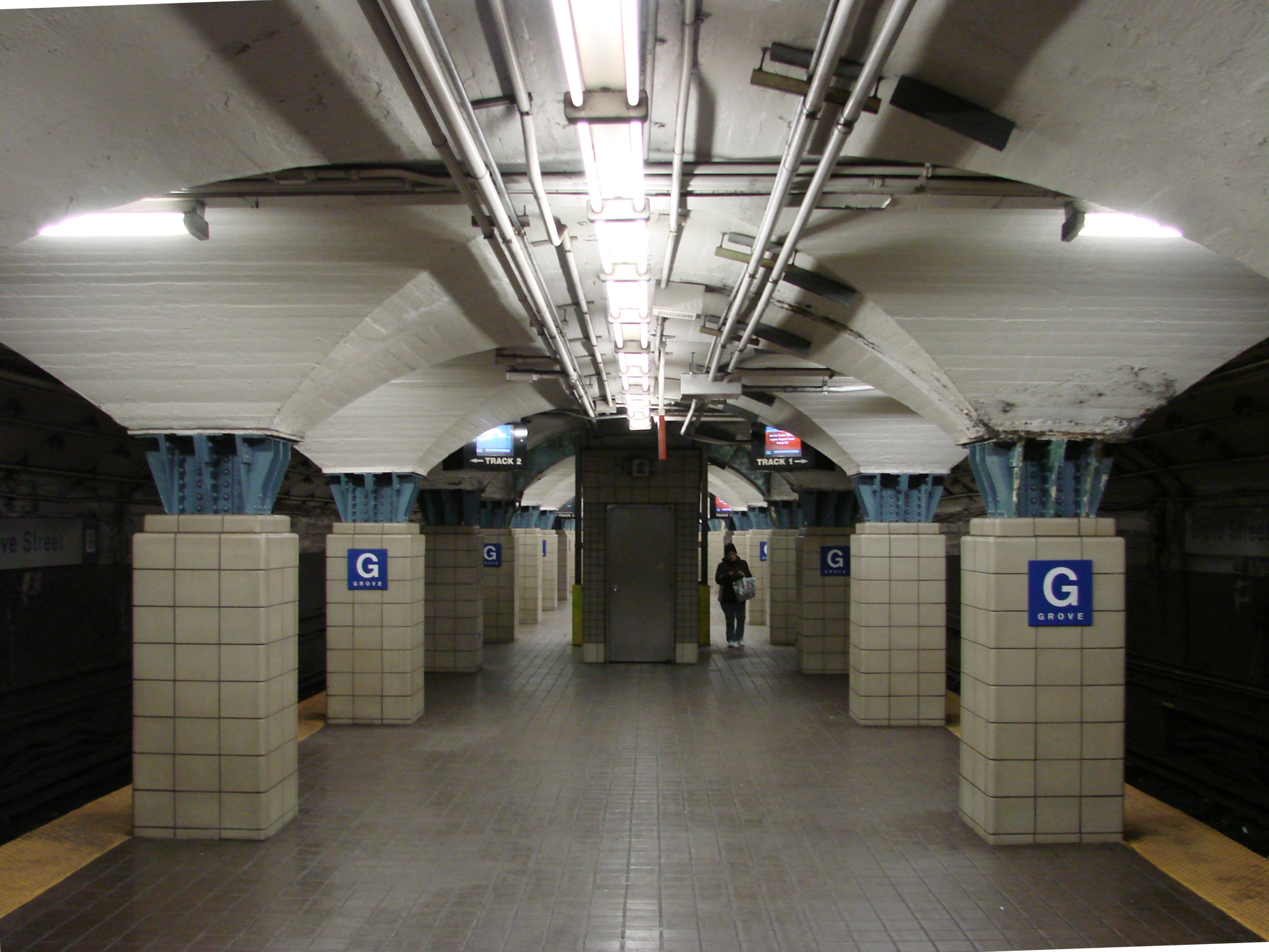
- Grove Street station platform

General information
- Location: Newark Avenue and Grove Street; Jersey City, New Jersey
- Coordinates: 40.719671°N 74.043117°W
- Owner: Port Authority of New York and New Jersey
- Platforms: 1 island platform
- Tracks: 2
- Connections: NJ Transit Bus: 9, 16, 63, 64, 68, 80, 81, 82, 86

Construction
- Parking: Paid parking nearby
- Accessible: Yes

History
- Opened: September 6, 1910
- Rebuilt: 2003
- Former names: Grove-Henderson Streets

Passengers
- 2025: 5,435,947 ▲10.1%
- Rank: 4 of 13

Services
Preceding station	PATH	Following station
Journal Square toward Newark	NWK–WTC	Exchange Place toward World Trade Center
Journal Square Terminus	JSQ–33	Newport toward 33rd Street
Late-nights
Journal Square Terminus	JSQ–33 (via HOB)	Newport toward 33rd Street
Former services
Preceding station	Hudson and Manhattan Railroad	Following station
Summit Avenue toward Park Place	Park Place–Hudson Terminal	Exchange Place toward Hudson Terminal
Track layout
Location

Grove Street station (originally Grove–Henderson Streets) is a station on the PATH system. Located at the intersection of Grove Street, Newark Avenue and Railroad Avenue in the Downtown neighborhood of Jersey City, New Jersey, it is served by the Newark–World Trade Center line at all times, the Journal Square–33rd Street line during the daytime, and the Journal Square–33rd Street (via Hoboken) line during late nights and weekend mornings.

== History ==
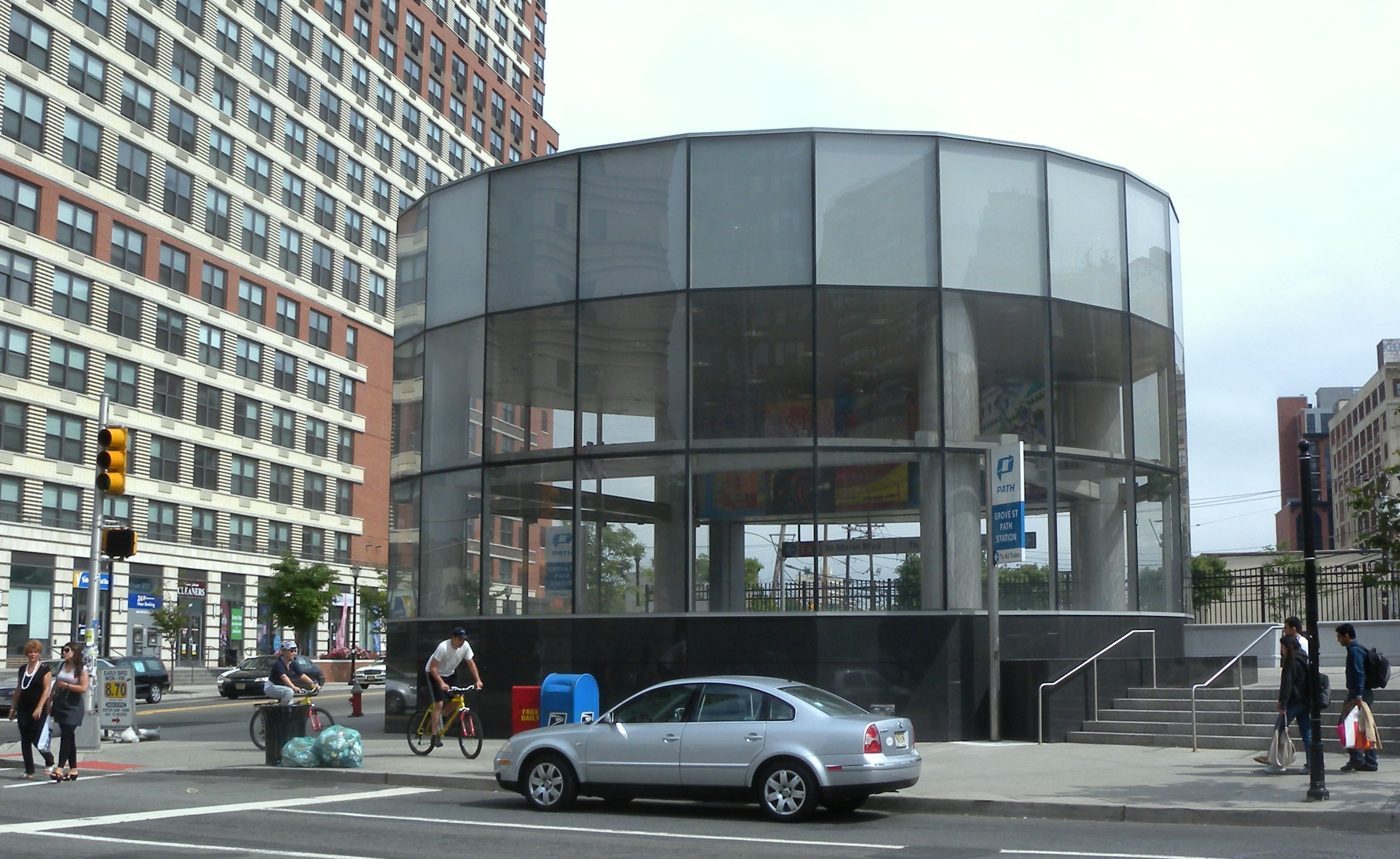
Eastern entrance at Marin Boulevard

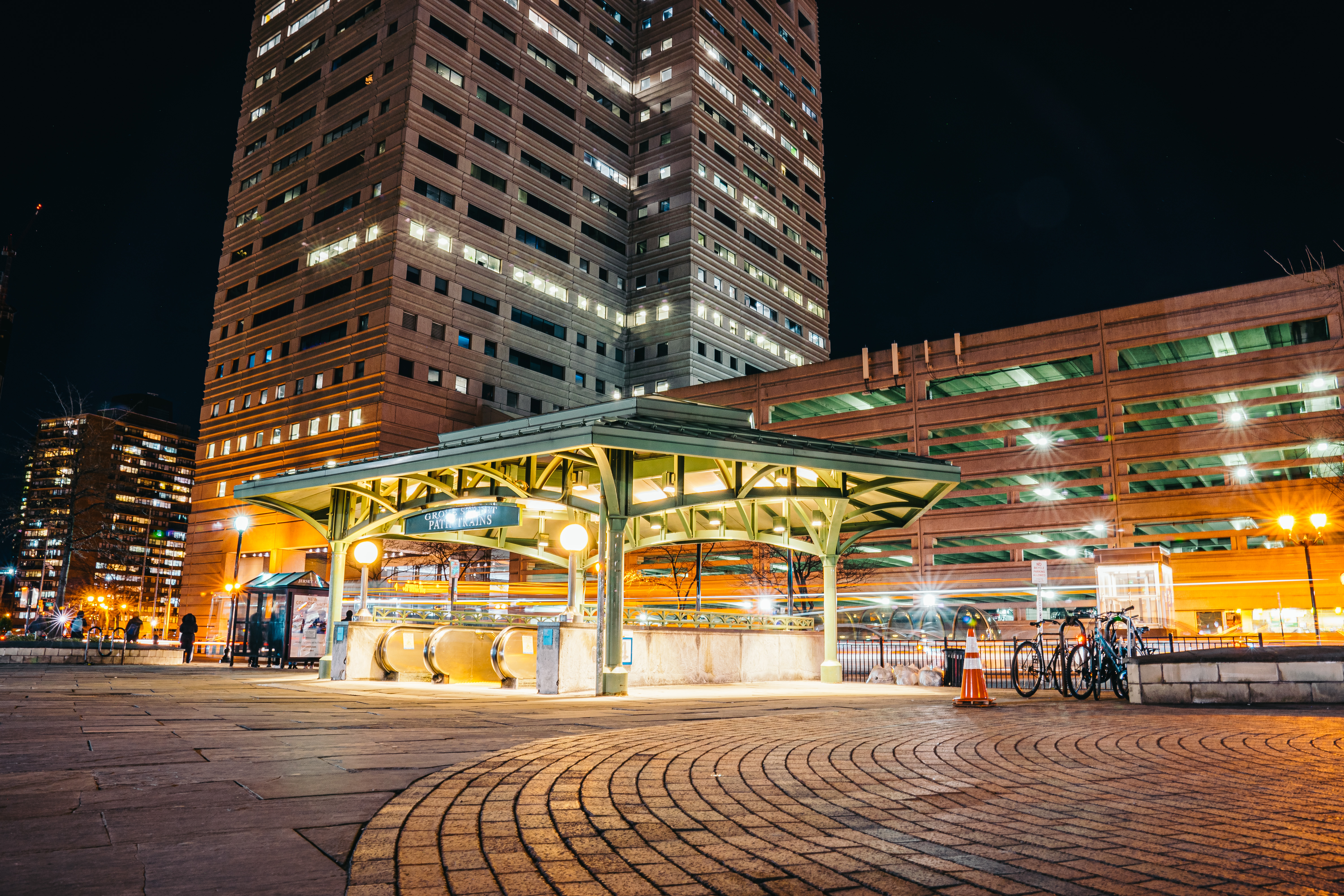
Western entrance at Grove Street

The station opened on September 6, 1910.

Originally, the station had exits at either end. The western stair led to the intersection of Grove Street and Newark Avenue and a simple kiosk underneath the Pennsylvania Railroad's mainline viaduct, which ran above what is now Christopher Columbus Drive. The station's easterly end exited to Henderson Street (now Marín Boulevard). The railroad viaduct was taken down in the late 1960s, and the station was reconfigured in the 1970s. As part of the reconstruction, the eastern and western exits were closed in favor of a mezzanine situated in a triangle formed by the intersections of Grove Street, Newark Avenue, and Columbus Drive. Two stairways from the platform level connect to the mezzanine, with fare turnstiles at the top of each stairway. Two exits lead to street level; one, with escalators, leads to the station's primary kiosk, while the other is a stairway that leads to the south side of Columbus Drive.

East of Grove Street Station was Henderson Street Yard, which closed in 1990 upon the opening of the Harrison Car Maintenance Facility in Harrison, New Jersey.

As a result of an increase in ridership, the Port Authority of New York and New Jersey (PANYNJ) reopened the easterly exit and built a second kiosk at the corner of Columbus Drive and Marín Boulevard. Despite the fact that construction of the eastern entrance/exit took place between 2003–2005, the station was not made compliant with the Americans with Disabilities Act of 1990. In September 2011, a federal judge found that it was technically feasible to do so and ordered the PANYNJ to make the station accessible. In 2014, the PANYNJ agreed to install an elevator at the western end of the station. Construction of elevator access began in April 2015, and the elevator opened in June 2017. However, a month after opening, it experienced several breakdowns.

In June 2019, the Port Authority released the PATH Improvement Plan. As part of the plan, every train on the NWK-WTC route will consist of 9-car trains. To accomplish this, the platform at Grove Street will be extended at the Marin Boulevard end of the station. The platform extension was expected to be completed by 2022. The Port Authority put the contract to extend the platform out to bid on January 28, 2020, and expected the cost of the project to be between $15 and $20 million. To extend the platform 51.33 feet (15.65 m), structural walls will be replaced by support columns.

== Station layout ==
The station has two tracks and one island platform.
