= Somerville station =

NJ Transit rail station

Somerville
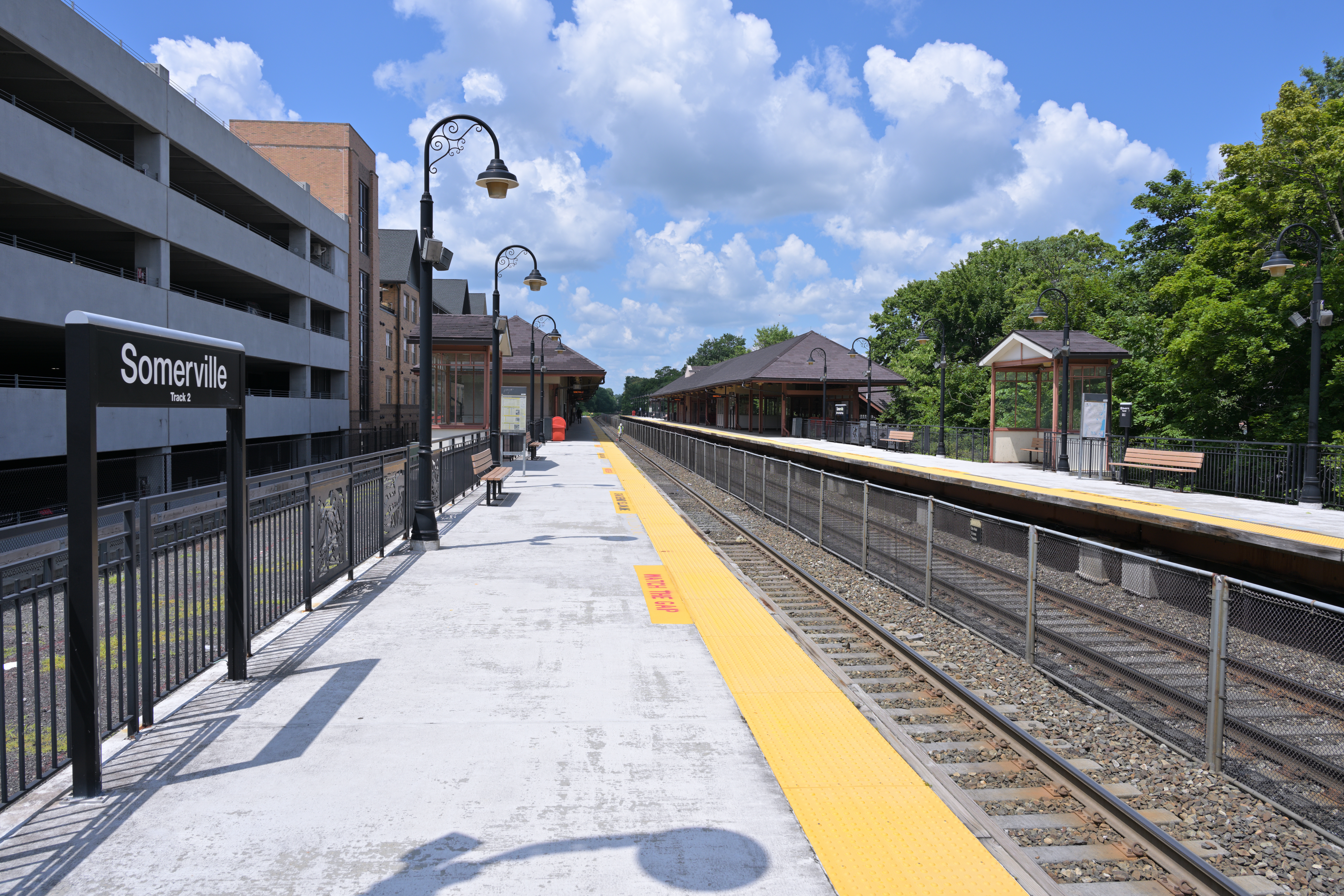
- Somerville station in 2026, looking west from the south platform

General information
- Location: South Bridge Street, Somerville, New Jersey
- Coordinates: 40.5661°N 74.6141°W
- Owner: NJ Transit
- Line: Raritan Valley Line
- Distance: 34.7 miles (55.8 km) from Jersey City
- Platforms: 2 side platforms
- Tracks: 2
- Connections: NJ Transit Bus: 65, 114

Construction
- Parking: Monthly or daily
- Accessible: Yes

Other information
- Fare zone: 17

History
- Opened: January 1, 1842
- Rebuilt: November 28, 1856; May 1867; September 1889–November 18, 1890

Passengers
- 2025: 432 (average weekday)
- Rank: 68 of 153

Services
Preceding station	NJ Transit	Following station
Raritan toward High Bridge	Raritan Valley Line	Bridgewater toward Newark Penn or New York
Former services
Preceding station	NJ Transit	Following station
Raritan toward High Bridge	Raritan Valley Line	Finderne (closed 2006) toward Newark Penn or New York
Preceding station	Central Railroad of New Jersey	Following station
Raritan toward Scranton	Main Line	Bound Brook toward Jersey City
Terminus	Somerville – Jersey City Local	Manville–Finderne toward Jersey City
Roycefield toward Flemington	South Branch	Terminus
Location

Somerville station is an active commuter railroad station in the eponymous borough of Somerville, Somerset County, New Jersey. Located on South Bridge Street, the station serves trains of NJ Transit's Raritan Valley Line between Newark Penn Station in Essex County to High Bridge in Hunterdon County. Somerville station consists of two high-level side platforms that surround two tracks and an intertrack fence. The station has a single parking lot that serve commuters on the southern side and some on-street parking on the northern side of the station. The railroad depot built by the Central Railroad of New Jersey in 1890 stands on the north side of the tracks, serving as a local business.

Somerville station opened on January 1, 1842 with the extension of the Elizabethtown and Somerville Railroad from Bound Brook. It served as the western terminus of service until September 25, 1848, when the railroad was extended to White House via the Somerville and Easton Railroad. The Central Railroad of New Jersey, which replaced the Elizabethtown and Somerville, replaced the station in 1856 and 1867 and finally in 1889–1890. NJ Transit replaced the low-level side platforms in 2010, with the current station opening on December 7, providing accessibility for handicapped persons.

== History ==
In 2004, the station's parking lot was expanded, toward the two railroad tracks, from the south side, to include parking for another 68 cars. These spaces are no longer available as a construction project is in progress.

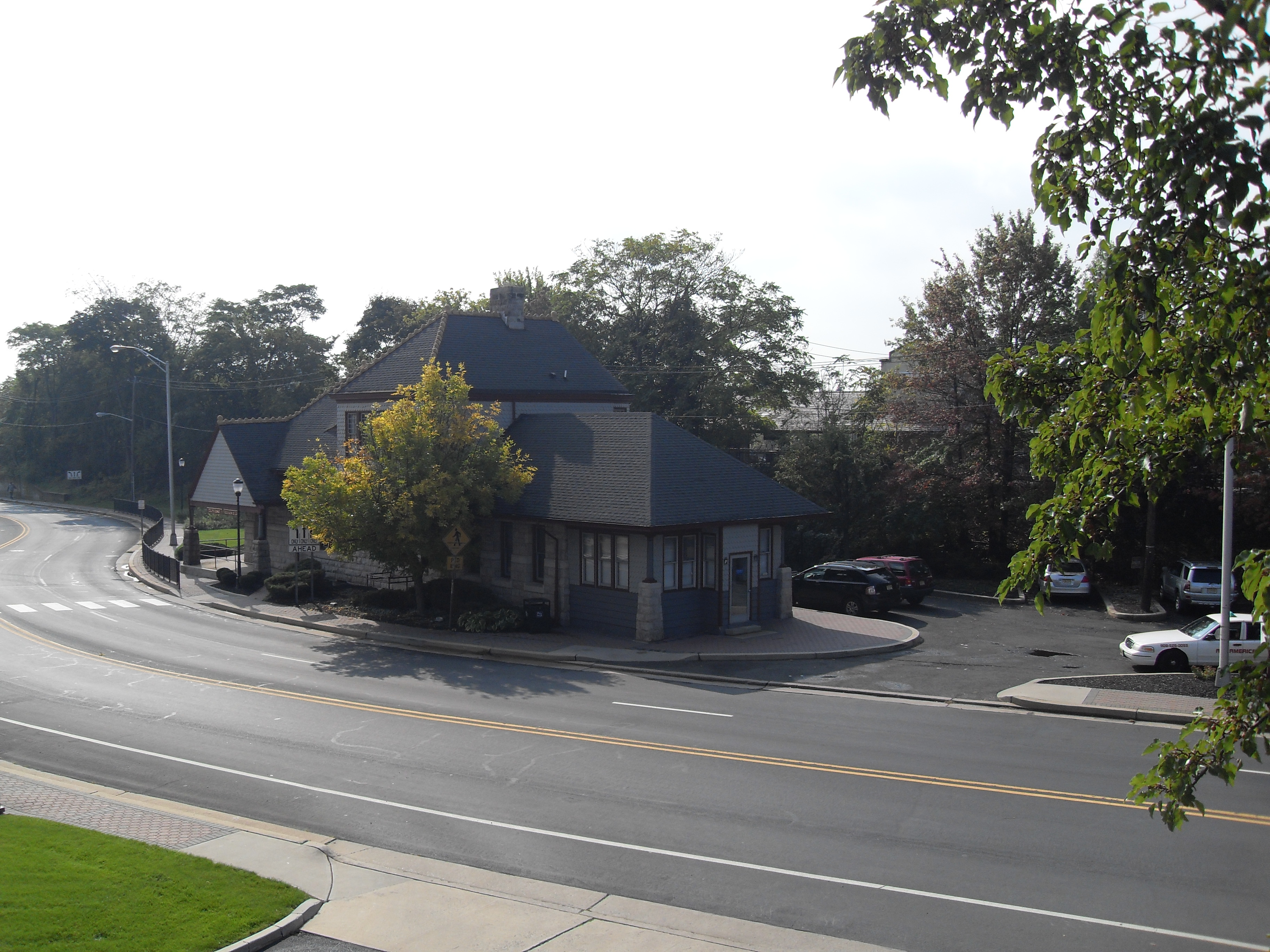
Historical building, former train station, 2008

At some point, the stationhouse and the train tracks were on the same level. An historical photo of the Somerville station with the tracks in front of it can be seen in the Arcadia Publishing historical photo book Somerset County in Postcards, by Alan A. Siegel, Somerset County Historical Society (ISBN 0-7385-0078-X). In 2009, a reconstruction project began at the station to install high-level platforms and make the station handicap accessible. This project includes new ramps, renovations to the existing tunnel, rehabilitation of the existing freight elevator shafts, a new tunnel headhouse, and demolition of the two existing waiting rooms. It was announced on December 1, 2010 that the high level platforms would open on Tuesday, December 7, 2010 to allow for demolition of the low level platforms and continued platform construction. The historic station depot is being kept.

Starting January 12, 2015, NJ Transit Raritan Valley Line started Midtown Direct service between New York City and Somerville and its surrounding area.

== Station layout ==
The station has two high-level side platforms serving two tracks. Both are 710 feet (220 m) long and can accommodate eight cars.

== Bibliography ==
- Bianculli, Anthony J. (2001). Trains and Technology: Track and Structures. University of Delaware Press. ISBN 9780874138023.
