= List of stations on the Central Railroad of New Jersey =

The following is a list of all stations on the Central Railroad of New Jersey, including the line they were on, the date service began and ceased, and notes on the station's current status.

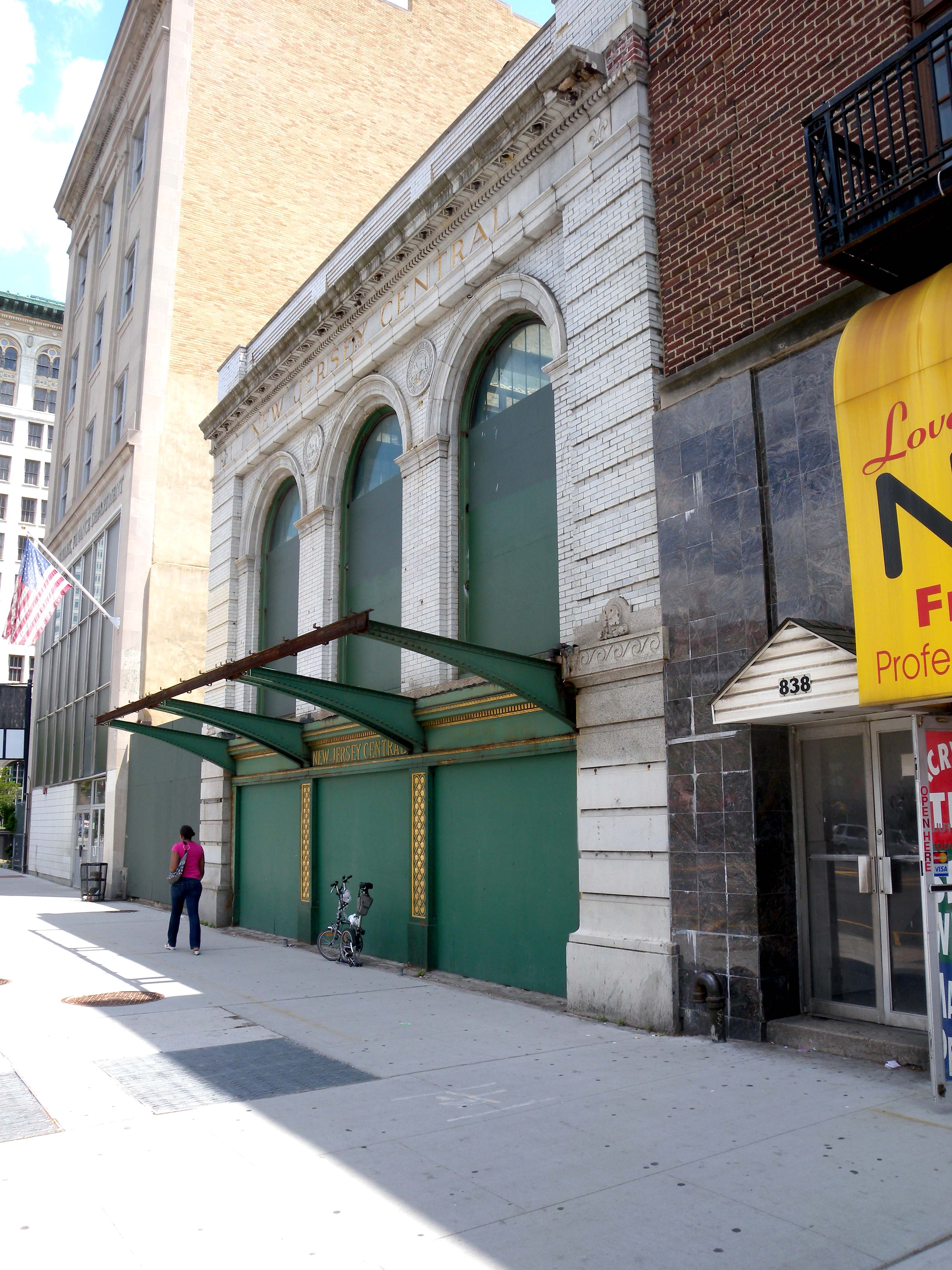
The Broad Street entrance to the former Broad Street station in Downtown Newark

== Main Line ==
Station	Service began	Service ceased	Station status
Liberty Street Ferry Terminal	1891	April 30, 1967	The Liberty Street Ferry Terminal was demolished for the construction of the World Trade Center.
Communipaw Terminal	1864	April 30, 1967	Station headhouse and canopy preserved in Liberty State Park.
Claremont	1868	April 25, 1954	
VanNostrand Place	1887	April 30, 1967	Currently a station on New Jersey Transit's Hudson-Bergen Light Rail.
Greenville	1866	April 30, 1967	Currently a station on New Jersey Transit's Hudson-Bergen Light Rail.
Pamrapo (East 49th Street)	1867	April 19, 1918	
East 45th Street	April 19, 1918	April 30, 1967	Currently a station on New Jersey Transit's Hudson-Bergen Light Rail.
East 33rd Street	1865–1866		Currently a station on New Jersey Transit's Hudson-Bergen Light Rail. The original station was sold in January 1961 to a private developer.
East 22nd Street	1860s	August 6, 1978	Currently a station on New Jersey Transit's Hudson-Bergen Light Rail.
West 8th Street	1864	August 6, 1978	Currently a station on New Jersey Transit's Hudson-Bergen Light Rail.
Avenue A	1885	1925	The station depot was demolished in 1925 for construction of the Newark Bay Bridge.
Singers		1926	Station created to serve the Singer Sewing Machine Company
Elizabethport	Late 1860s	August 6, 1978	Rebuilt in 1938 at the cost of $141,000 by Turtur Brothers. Service at the new station began in December 1938 despite being unfinished. Transfer station for Newark and for trains running on the (Perth Amboy & Elizabethport Branch).
Spring Street	1869	April 30, 1967	
Elizabeth	1839	August 6, 1978	The station was a point of transfer between Elizabeth station on the Pennsylvania Railroad.
Elmora Avenue	April 1870	1967	
Lorraine	mid-1890s	April 30, 1967	The station depot at Lorraine was demolished in 1968.
Roselle–Roselle Park	Late 1860s	August 6, 1978	
Aldene	1892	April 25, 1954	The westbound station was demolished in April 1972 after becoming a yard office in 1954.
Cranford	1839		Currently a station on New Jersey Transit's Raritan Valley Line.
Garwood	1892		Currently a station on New Jersey Transit's Raritan Valley Line.
Westfield	1839		Currently a station on New Jersey Transit's Raritan Valley Line.
Fanwood	1838		Currently a station on New Jersey Transit's Raritan Valley Line.
Netherwood	1874		Currently a station on New Jersey Transit's Raritan Valley Line.
Plainfield	1839		Currently a station on New Jersey Transit's Raritan Valley Line.
Grant Avenue	September 28, 1885	April 26, 1986	The railroad razed the depot in 1981 and replaced it with an open-face shelter. The replacement was vandalized within a week and never replaced.
Clinton Avenue	1872	April 30, 1967	The station agent was terminated on April 24, 1954 and the depot was demolished in 1957.
Dunellen	1840		Currently a station on New Jersey Transit's Raritan Valley Line. The station depot was replaced in 1955, opening on December 10.
Middlesex	1893		The station depot was demolished in 1972.
Bound Brook	1842		Currently a station on New Jersey Transit's Raritan Valley Line.
Calco	1915	1966	The station was replaced in 1999 by the Bridgewater station on the Raritan Valley Line.
Manville-Finderne	1851	2006	Station depot removed in 1972 and service ended in 2006
Somerville	January 1, 1842		Currently a station on New Jersey Transit's Raritan Valley Line.
Raritan	c. 1851		Currently a station on New Jersey Transit's Raritan Valley Line.
North Branch	1848		Currently a station on New Jersey Transit's Raritan Valley Line. The former CNJ depot, built in 1900, burned in a morning fire on January 8, 1970. The depot was replaced by glass shelters after the fire.
White House	Late 1840s		Currently a station on New Jersey Transit's Raritan Valley Line.
Lebanon	c. 1852		Currently a station on New Jersey Transit's Raritan Valley Line. The agent was removed in 1962. They sold the depot in 1967 to the High Iron Company, who sold it in 1971 for $40,000.
Annandale	July 4, 1852		Currently a station on New Jersey Transit's Raritan Valley Line. Until 1873, the station was known as Clinton, when Annandale was suggested by a railroad official to change the name. The station depot was closed and replaced by a shelter in October 1970. The depot was torn down c. 1983.
High Bridge	1856		Currently a station on New Jersey Transit's Raritan Valley Line. Junction point with (High Bridge Branch) to Califon, Long Valley and Morris County
Glen Gardner	1852	January 1, 1983	The station was named Spruce Run at opening, but renamed to Glen Gardner in 1871. The railroad eliminated the station agent in June 1950.
Hampton	1852	January 1, 1983	The station depot was closed and replaced by a shelter in October 1970.
Ludlow-Asbury	Early 1850s	1967	
Valley	1852	1933	
Bloomsbury	1852		
Springtown	1852	1932	
Vulcanite	1894	c. 1945	The agent at Vulcanite was removed in 1934 while depot was demolished in 1966.
Phillipsburg Union Station	1852	January 1, 1983	
New Jersey – Pennsylvania state line at Phillipsburg
Easton	1868		The station depot was burned on Labor Day 1975 and demolished in October.
Glendon	before 1885		
Island Park			
Freemansburg	1868		The agent at Freemansburg was eliminated in 1947. The station was demolished in 1966.
Bethlehem	1868	August 18, 1967	
Bethlehem Junction	1873	April 27, 1930	The station was a junction with the South Bethlehem Branch of the Lehigh and New England Railway.
Allentown	March 7, 1890	August 18, 1967	Despite opening in March 1890, the CNJ depot was built in 1888 in preparation of service.
Gordon Street	1890		A depot was constructed in 1893 at Gordon Street, which became a crew quarters during The Great Depression.
Front Street	1890	before 1915	
East Allentown	1868	1890	The station was closed in 1890 when the downtown Allentown station was opened. The East Allentown depot was demolished in 1911.
Catasauqua	1867		The station was demolished in 1955.
Northampton	1867	1920	The station depot, formerly known as Laubach's, was demolished in the 1970s.
Siegfried	1867		The station was originally known was Siegfried's Bridge until the late 1870s. A new station was constructed in 1888 and again in 1892. The depot was closed during the Great Depression.
Treichlers	1867	1952	The station remained open for freight service until 1969.
Walnutport	1867	1952	The station depot was demolished in 1956.
Lehigh Gap	1867	1952	The station depot was demolished in 1960.
Palmerton	February 8, 1911	1952	
Hazard	1880	February 8, 1911	The station was renamed in 1884 from Hazardville. The station was closed when the Palmerton station opened up.
Bowmanstown	1870s–1880s	1952	The station was demolished in 1965.
Parryville	1867	1956	The station depot was constructed in July 1873.
Weissport	1867	1952	The station was constructed in 1878 and demolished in the late 1970s.
Lehighton	1867	1952	The station was demolished in 1960.
Jim Thorpe	1865	June 1965	The station depot was constructed in 1869 and replaced in 1873.
Drakes Point	1882–1885	before 1915	The station was a flag stop.
Rockport	1865	1952	The station was demolished in Hurricane Diane in August 1955.
Leslie Run	1872	1919	The station was closed by the United States Railroad Administration.
Drifton Junction	1884	c. 1913	The station depot burned on June 11, 1913 and the station was closed soon after.
Maple Island	1882	1885	The station was a flag stop.
Tannery	1888		
White Haven			
Tunnel			
Glen Summit			
Penobscot			
Laurel Run			
Ashley			
Wilkes-Barre			Luzerne County purchased the station in 2006, but has not yet been restored or opened for businesses due to a lack of funds from the County Redevelopment Authority
Hudson			
Minooka Junction			
Miner's Mills			
Taylor			
Scranton			Part of a redevelopment project to use the space for a restaurant, retail space and offices

== Perth Amboy & Elizabethport Branch and New York & Long Branch RR ==
At Elizabethport, the Jersey Central's Perth Amboy & Elizabethport Branch split from the Main Line and ran as far as South Amboy, where it became the New York and Long Branch Railroad. The NY&LB ran as far as Bay Head Junction, NJ and was owned and operated jointly by the CNJ and PRR. At Woodbridge Jct, the Pennsylvania Railroad's Perth Amboy & Woodbridge Branch from the mainline at Rahway met the Perth Amboy & Elizabethport and the PRR had trackage rights south to the NY&LB. Currently the line is used for freight as the Chemical Coast.

Station	Service began	Service ceased	Station status
Elizabeth Avenue	1875		
West Carteret	1875	1948	The station was closed in 1948 due to low ridership and other available services.
Sewaren	July 3, 1876	April 30, 1967	The station depot at Sewaren burned on August 3, 1957. The passenger shelter, built in 1959, was removed in 1968.
Perth Amboy			Still in service as NJT's Perth Amboy station.
South Amboy			Still in service as NJT's South Amboy station.
Cliffwood			
Matawan			Still in service as NJT's Aberdeen-Matawan station.
Hazlet	1875		Still in service as NJT's Hazlet station. The CNJ removed the station agent in 1952.
Middletown	1876		Still in service as NJT's Middletown station.
Red Bank			Still in service as NJT's Red Bank station.
Little Silver			Still in service as NJT's Little Silver station.
Branchport		June 8, 1955	The stations at Branchport and West End were eliminated with the opening of the new Long Branch station on June 8, 1955. The depot caught fire on July 1–2, 1956 and condemned.
Long Branch			The station depot built at Long Branch in 1891 was demolished in 1955 by a contractor from Belford, New Jersey.
West End		June 8, 1955	The original station at West End burned in a suspicious fire on August 27, 1921. Service at West End, along with Branchport, ended on June 8, 1955 with the construction of the new Long Branch station. The replacement depot was retired in 1955 for a branch of a local bank.
Elberon	1876		Still in service as NJT's Elberon station. The depot burned down on May 25, 1988.
Deal			The station depot, abandoned for the most part, burned on February 15, 1958.
Allenhurst	May 17, 1897		Still in service as NJT's Allenhurst station. The station was demolished on April 13, 1982.
North Asbury Park		July 21, 1975	
Asbury Park	June 26, 1875		Still in service as NJT's Asbury Park station. The station depot, constructed in 1922, was demolished in March 1978.
Bradley Beach			Still in service as NJT's Bradley Beach station.
Avon			
Belmar			Still in service as Belmar station
Como		June 30, 1934	The railroad proposed adding "Como" to the Spring Lake station name in 1934 as part of the closing of the Como station. This was declined.
Spring Lake			Still in service as Spring Lake station
Sea Girt		July 21, 1975	
Manasquan	1876		Still in service as Manasquan station. The station depot burned down on March 30, 1996 and razed that May. A replacement structure was constructed in 2004.
Brielle			
Point Pleasant			Still in service as Point Pleasant Beach station. The station depot was demolished on June 8, 1987 and replaced by an office trailer. After several delays, construction of the new station began in June 1994. The new depot opened in January 1996.
Bay Head Junction			Still in service as Bay Head station. The station depot was demolished in 1976 and replaced by a smaller structure.

== Freehold Branch ==
South from Matawan, the CNJ operated the following stations:

Station	Service began	Service ceased	Station status
Stillwell Street			
Freneau			The railroad donated the Freneau depot, built in 1906, to the Pine Creek Railroad for their museum.
Morganville			The station depot was demolished c. 1980.
Wickatunk			The station depot at Wickatunk was constructed in 1900 and razed in 1973.
Bradevelt			The station agent was reduced to seasonal service in 1928, and removed completely in August 1938.
Marlboro		1953	As of 2026, the building still stands as office space for a contractor company. It is viewable from the Henry Hudson Trail.
East Freehold			
Freehold		April 25, 1953	A connection was provided to Freehold and Jamesburg Agricultural Railroad

== Seashore Branch ==
East from Matawan, the CNJ operated the following stations:

Station name	Service began	Service ceased	Station status
Keyport	1879	November 2, 1966	The station depot, constructed in 1890, burned down on July 4, 1968 despite attempts to acquire the station.
First Street	1880	1884	The depot was demolished in 1907, but a freight house built in 1885 remained until September 1974.
Union Beach	1921	November 2, 1966	The station depot burned on May 10, 1952 and was replaced with a wooden shelter.
Natco	1880		The station was known as Lolliard until the late 1910s.
Keansburg	1889	November 2, 1966	The station depot, constructed in 1891, was sold in 1964 by the railroad and demolished in the early 1970s.
Port Monmouth	1889	November 2, 1966	The original station depot at Port Monmouth was moved to Belford in 1890. The agent was relieved of his duty in December 1954 with the depot remaining on the condition a shelter was constructed. By 1960, that did not occur, with most commuters waiting in the elements. The station depot at Port Monmouth burned on March 5, 1997 due to arson while serving as home to a local charity. The charity, "Middletown Helps Its Own", rebuilt the station on the same foundation following general architectural design of the original, where it remains today. This "rebuilt" station is the only CNJ-era structure to exist on the Seashore Branch, now the Henry Hudson Trail.
Belford	1889	November 2, 1966	The station depot came from the one at Port Monmouth in 1890. The station depot lost its agent in 1964, when those services were moved to Keansburg. The depot was demolished in 1973.
Leonardo	1891	November 2, 1966	The station depot at Leonardo was built in 1900. By 1959, the station depot had been boarded up and considered a community eyesore. 94 residents sent a letter to the CNJ requesting its demolition. That became a reality in 1963, when the depot was razed in favor of a station shelter.
Atlantic Highlands	1883	November 2, 1966	The station depot was replaced in 1893, while the older depot became a freight station. The newer depot burned down on December 16, 1951. A new station opened in its place on December 21, 1952 that lasted until 1973.
Hiltons	1896	November 30, 1958	
Water Witch	1895	November 30, 1958	The station depot at Water Witch was constructed in 1903 and demolished shortly after passenger service ended.
Highlands	1892	November 30, 1958	The station was built in 1900 and replaced by a shelter in 1951.
Highlands Beach	1866	November 29, 1944	The first passenger depot was constructed in 1874 and replaced in 1892. This depot lasted until 1944, until it was replaced by a passenger shelter. However, the service would stop after a storm ruined the railroad tracks.
Navesink Beach	1882	November 29, 1944	No station depot was ever built at Navesink Beach, just a passenger shelter, replaced in 1912.
Normandy	1884	November 29, 1944	The station depot existed until the late 1910s, when it was replaced by a shelter.
Rumson Beach	1883	c. 1900	The station was known as Stokem's until 1888, when it was renamed to Rumson Beach.
Laidlaws		1941	The station was an unofficial summer stop for trains prior to 1902. The railroad built a platform in 1902 for permanent summer trains.
Sea Bright	1866	November 29, 1944	The station depot at Sea Bright was erected in 1871 until being replaced in 1900. As part of the project to extend NJ 36, the Monmouth Boat Club demolished the station in 1950 and used some material for a shed on their campus.
Low Moor	1877		The station was known as Monmouth Beach North until 1882. The station was built in 1886. After a freak storm in July 1938, the roof was blown off the depot, which was tilted over. The railroad promptly razed the depot.
Galilee	1877	1942	The station was known as Monmouth Beach Centre until 1882. It was changed at that point to Monmouth Beach, until changing to Galilee in 1887. They replaced the depot in 1903. In 1929, the railroad abandoned the agency at Galilee and established it at Monmouth Beach station.
Monmouth Beach	1877	November 29, 1944	The station depot at Monmouth Beach was constructed in 1877 and replaced in 1888. That one survived until 1955.
North Long Branch	1866	November 29, 1944	The station at North Long Branch had its first depot constructed in 1874. A fire on November 11, 1904 caused the depot to come down. In 1907, a new depot opened on the site, which would last until 1980.
East Long Branch	1870	November 29, 1944	The station at East Long Branch was sold in 1946 and demolished in the late 1960s.

== Newark and New York Branch ==
The Newark and New York Railroad opened in 1869 and ran between the CRRNJ Terminal and Broad Street in Newark.

== South Branch ==
Station	Service began	Service ceased	Station status
Roycefield	1866	April 25, 1953	The station was razed in 1955.
Flagtown	1868	April 25, 1953	The railroad sold the station in 1953.
Neshanic	1864	April 25, 1953	
Woodfern		April 25, 1953	
Higginsville		April 25, 1953	
Three Bridges	1864	April 25, 1953	The station was razed in 1955 for selling the land to New Jersey Power and Light.
Flemington	July 1, 1864	April 25, 1953	

== Southern Division ==
In 1917, the CNJ took over the New Jersey Southern Railroad. It was along this trackage that the CNJ operated its most famous train, The Blue Comet, which ran from Jersey City to Winslow Junction, and then along The Reading Co's Atlantic City Railroad trackage to Atlantic City. South from Red Bank, the CNJ operated the following stations:

Station	Service began	Service ceased	Station status
Shrewsbury			
Eatontown			Demolished
Earle			
Farmingdale			
Lakewood			The station depot at Lakewood burned on the morning of May 30, 1939.
South Lakewood			The station depot at South Lakewood was razed in July 1953 for construction of a grocery store.
Lakehurst			
Whiting			Partly owned with Pennsylvania Railroad and Tuckerton Railroad. Demolished 1958.
Winslow Junction			Demolished late 1970s.
Vineland			Demolished
Bridgeton Junction			
Mauricetown			
Bivalve			

== Bibliography ==
- Bernhart, Benjamin L. (2004). Historic Journeys By Rail: Central Railroad of New Jersey Stations, Structures & Marine Equipment. Outer Station Project. ISBN 1891402072.
- Bianculli, Anthony J. (2001). Trains and Technology: Track and Structures. University of Delaware Press. ISBN 9780874138023.
- Gallo, Tom (1999). Images of America: Henry Hudson Trail: Central RR of NJ's Seashore Branch. Arcadia Publishing. ISBN 9780738501888.
- Gallo, Tom (2009). Images of America: Keyport Firefighting. Arcadia Publishing. ISBN 9780738563619.
- Snell, James P. (1881). History of Hunterdon and Somerset Counties, New Jersey: With Illustrations and Biographical Sketches of Its Prominent Men and Pioneers. Everts and Peck.
- Warrick, John R. (1990). Central Jersey's Southern Division. Lakeside Productions.
