= Central Railroad of New Jersey Station =

Central Railroad of New Jersey Station may refer to:

- any former station of the Central Railroad of New Jersey, or
- Central Railroad of New Jersey (Fanwood, New Jersey), listed on the NRHP in New Jersey
- Central Railroad of New Jersey Freight Station, Scranton, Pennsylvania, listed on the NRHP in Pennsylvania
- Central Railroad of New Jersey Station (Jim Thorpe, Pennsylvania), listed on the NRHP in Pennsylvania
- Central Railroad of New Jersey Station (Wilkes-Barre, Pennsylvania), listed on the NRHP in Pennsylvania
