= Lebanon station (NJ Transit) =

NJ Transit rail station

Lebanon
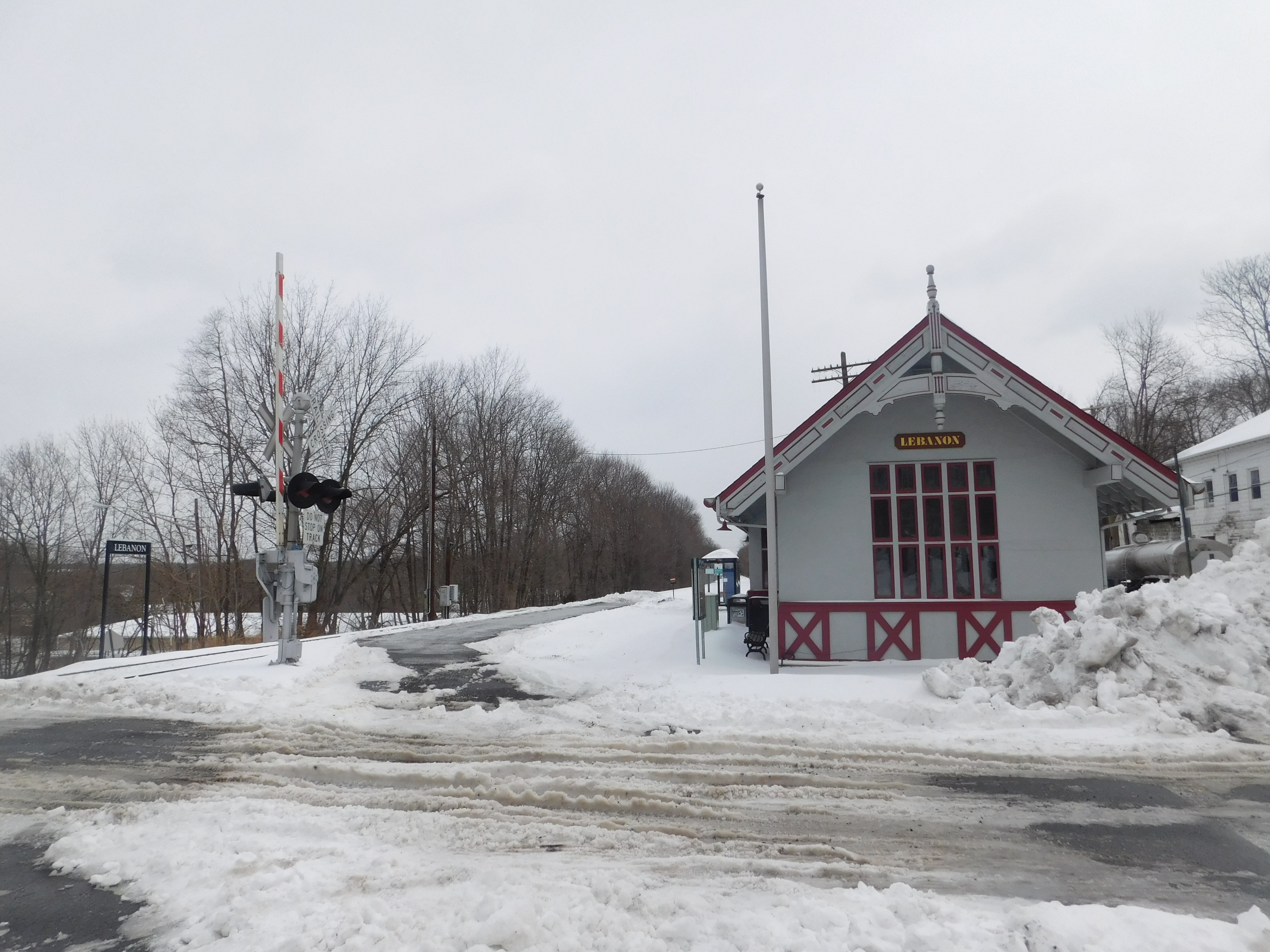
- Lebanon station after the March 2017 North American blizzard.

General information
- Location: 1 Railroad Avenue, Lebanon, New Jersey
- Coordinates: 40.6373°N 74.8370°W
- Owner: New Jersey Transit
- Line: Raritan Valley Line
- Distance: 48.0 miles (77.2 km) from Jersey City
- Platforms: 1 side platform
- Tracks: 1

Construction
- Accessible: No

Other information
- Fare zone: 20

History
- Opened: July 4, 1852
- Rebuilt: 1854–1855; 1900

Key dates
- August 1962: Station agent removed

Passengers
- 2025: 15 (average weekday)
- Rank: 150 of 153

Services
Preceding station	NJ Transit	Following station
Annandale toward High Bridge	Raritan Valley Line weekdays	White House toward Newark Penn or New York
Former services
Preceding station	Central Railroad of New Jersey	Following station
Annandale toward Scranton	Main Line	White House toward Jersey City
Location

Lebanon station is an active commuter railroad station in the borough of Lebanon, Hunterdon County, New Jersey. Located at the grade crossing of Railroad Avenue, the station services trains of NJ Transit's Raritan Valley Line between High Bridge station and Newark Penn Station during peak hours on weekdays. All other services terminate at Raritan station in Somerset County. Lebanon station consists of a single low-level asphalt side platform and the former Central Railroad of New Jersey depot on the platform. It also contains a small 15-space parking lot available for free.

Service through Lebanon began with the extension of the Somerville and Easton Railroad west from White House station to Easton, Pennsylvania on July 4, 1852. The station was rebuilt from 1899–1900 and designed by architect Bradford Gilbert. The station agent at Lebanon station was eliminated in August 1962 and the township purchased the depot in 1978.

== History ==
Lebanon station suffered some damage on November 4, 1947 when the Queen of the Valley train operated by the CNJ crashed into a truck crossing the right-of-way at Railroad Avenue. The truck, which had been carrying 10-foot (3.0 m) long copper tubing, was struck in the back, sending the tubing in multiple directions down the tracks and towards the depot. The impact sent the truck itself into the Lebanon depot, knocking it off its foundation. Several pieces of the copper tubing went through the depot, breaking windows and crashing into the ticket office. Debris from the struck freight truck also stuck to the locomotive, which stopped operating down the tracks.

George Creitz, the station agent, escaped the flying debris due to being in his seat answering a telegram rather than upright and hit by the errant tubing. George Lambert, a farmer from Cokesbury, was killed instantly by the flying copper tubing after having just stepped out of the station. The momentum of the impact sent the pipes straight into his head. Lambert was there paying for a bill for a new bull, and was about to see his new animal when the accident occurred. The truck driver, Benjamin Eastmead of Trenton, escaped injury by being out of the range of the impact. A work crew had to be called to clean up the mess caused by the accident. Eastmead was arraigned that evening in Flemington by a local magistrate and held in jail on a $500 (1947 USD) bail. He denied seeing any train or hearing the train. The magistrate also fined Eastmead $50 for crossing the grade without stopping. Eastmead was free on bail due to being a material witness during the investigation. Police noted that Eastmead had a previous ticket on October 21 for crossing U.S. Route 22 and State Route 29 in Union Township without stopping and speeding. He pled guilty on October 27 and was fined $40.

A grand jury in Flemington declined to hold charges against Eastmead for the accident in December 1947 and the death of Lambert for manslaughter. However, the grand jury criticized the CNJ for lack of adequate guard facilities at the crossing, with only a single warning bell that Eastmead did not hear due to the weather. They recommend the CNJ replace the warning facilities at Lebanon station to prevent future accidents. In January 1948, the railroad notified the Hunterdon County Prosecutor Herbert Heisel that they would install new flasher light signals at the crossing to ensure that future accidents would be prevented. In December 1948, the railroad won a judgment of $2,404.79 for the damages incurred in the accident against Eastmead's employer, Biter's Transfer Company of Trenton. $1,731.53 was for fixing the damaged Lebanon depot, $560.43 for the damaged locomotive and the rest for the crews that cleaned up the crash. The three-day trial also resulted in a $50,000 lawsuit against the railroad by Lambert's estate being dismissed, along with a countersuit from Biter's for damages incurred.

=== Station agent removed and renovation (1962–1968) ===
The CNJ announced on July 5, 1962 that they would have a hearing with State Public Utility Commissioners to eliminate the station agent at Lebanon, which would be held on July 23 in Newark. At the meeting on July 23, the railroad argued that the station was giving the railroad only $20,000 in yearly revenue on average and that the railroad would save money eliminating the agent. With no ticket agent, riders would have to wait in the depot and purchase their tickets on the train while remaining freight service, including cars to F. L. Smidth and Company, a local firm, would be dealt with at White House station. F. L. Smidth and Company backed the railroad and stated their service would improve under the proposed structure. The Jersey Central Commuters' Association also backed the choice by the railroad, stating that Annandale and White House had greater priority due to their parking facilities. The Lebanon Borough Council voiced their opposition to application, but their response was met with cool support compared to the railroad company. No opposition was offered in person at the hearing.

The concerns for riders about having to wait outside in an unheated structure for their train were dampened little bit in early August 1962, when the railroad said that the station depot would remain open, regardless if there was a ticket agent or not. The railroad added that the station earned $109,018, of which $26,329 went to the railroad, but the net profit from the railroad was $19,359. The previous year, only 78 tickets were sold monthly at the depot and 122 cars of freight were serviced. The Borough Council added to their opposition that the railroad's freight volume would be more than enough to keep the services of the station agent. However, speculation was that the Commissioners would agree in the railroad's favor.

In 1968, the High Iron Company, an organization created in 1966 to restore and operate steam engines, rented the station for use from the CNJ. By that point, the railroad station had lost its agent and was continuously maintained for the commuters. The High Iron Company would restore the station to its original condition. This included restoring the glass windows, removing varnish from the ticket office and waiting room. The company would also have the ticket office floor removed and covered with a fresh floor. It also would retain and restore the waiting room floor. All work would be done by local firms in preparation for excursions in the summer of 1968 to Montreal, Quebec and Niagara Falls, New York.

In September 1968, High Iron announced they would hold a dedication ceremony on September 23, with Nickel Plate Road 759 on display before it would take the Palmerton Limited and its riders to Palmerton, Pennsylvania. The following 15 cars would hold around 800 passengers and do several photography stops. The company added that the population of Lebanon would double in five minutes as part of the events.

On September 23, the ribbon cutting ceremony occurred at the waiting room at 9:40 a.m. Ross Rowland Jr., the president of High Iron, cut the ribbon along with Lebanon Mayor Willard Young Jr. and Albert Bjorkner, the Director of Passenger service for the CNJ. All three spoke at the ceremony, noting that the railroad would be purchasing the depot from the railroad after renting it. The train went off to Palmerton Fair without issue, but the trip back resulted in issues for the railroad. Firefighters in Lebanon had put water in the locomotive's 22,000-US-gallon (83,000 L) tank, but the locomotive used more water than expected, resulting in a refill at Jim Thorpe, Pennsylvania and Mauch Chunk station. The continued water consumption resulted in a third stop in Bethlehem, Pennsylvania to take on more liquid. At Mauch Chunk, the timetable also struggled to get the 402 ton locomotive turned around was unable to close properly for 759 to leave the turntable. Workmen in the yard had to use jacks to get the locomotive under the turntable. After the turntable delay, the excursion had lost over two hours. After making special stops in Lebanon, Raritan, the locomotive reached Elizabeth at 10:30 p.m., three hours late.

However, high rates of expenses resulted in the High Iron company having to sell off their equipment and the Lebanon station depot in 1971. The station depot would be offered for $40,000 along with the nine passenger cars for another $40,000 at a total of $80,000. Stating that they thought it would be only be a temporary inconvenience, they were choosing to not dissolve the firm, but just sell off assets to ensure stability. They offered a final excursion train on August 14, 1971 that would go from Hoboken Terminal to the Pocono Mountains and Binghamton, New York for overnight stays at local hotels.

However, Rowland Jr. wanted to see if he could purchase the CNJ's 15.6-mile (25.1 km) South Branch to Flemington and use that as a new tourist railroad. In doing so, he felt that he could offer freight services and excursion passenger service to the point of making a profit. While the cost for the branch would be over $150,000 and another $250,000 to restore it, Rowland decided to hold on to the passenger cars (but not Lebanon station) he was going to sell until he found out his prospects on the South Branch.

== Station layout ==
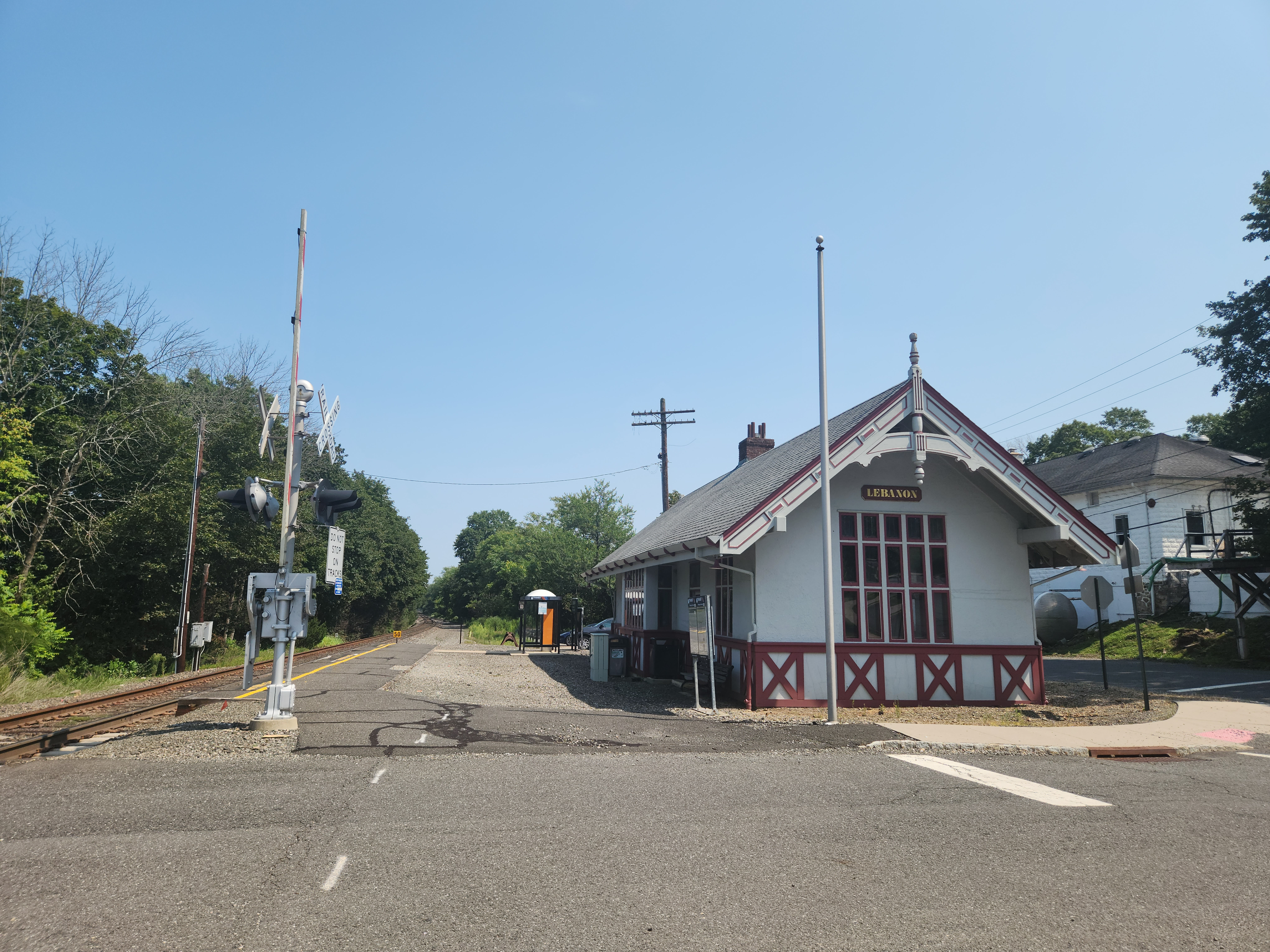
Lebanon station in August 2023

Lebanon station is a single 97-foot (30 m) side platform station located at the intersection of Cherry and Central Avenue. The stop has a single ticket vending machine on the platform near the depot. It also has bicycle access. The station contains a 15-space parking lot, owned by NJ Transit and free for commuter use on weekdays and weekends except overnight. The station services trains of the Raritan Valley Line on weekdays only. The station is in fare zone 20 along with Annandale station.
