= White House station =

NJ Transit rail station

White House
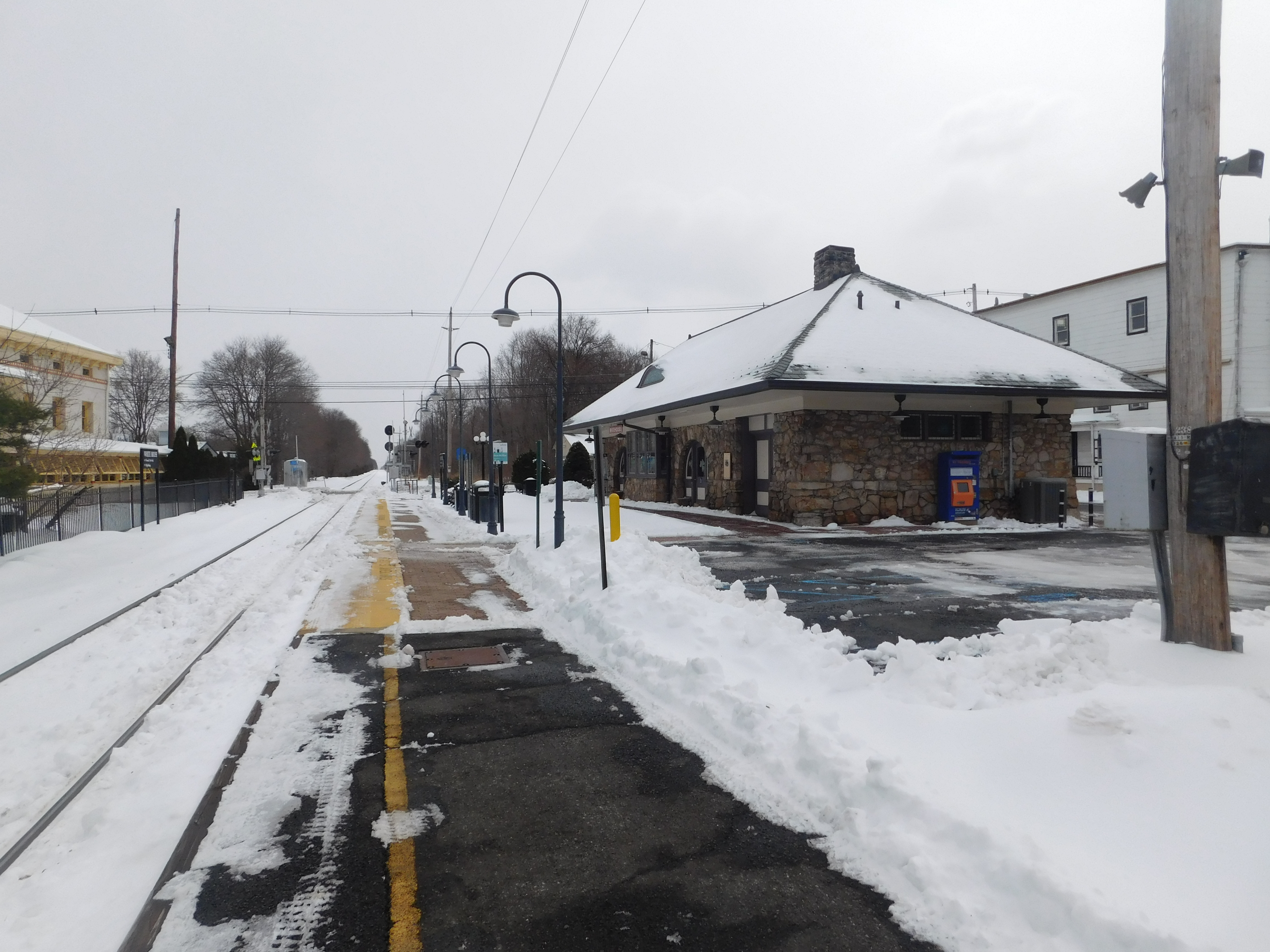
- White House station in March 2017.

General information
- Location: 255 Main Street (CR 523), Whitehouse Station, New Jersey
- Owner: New Jersey Transit
- Line: Raritan Valley Line
- Distance: 44.3 miles (71.3 km) from Jersey City
- Platforms: 1 side platform
- Tracks: 1

Construction
- Platform levels: 1
- Parking: Yes
- Accessible: No

Other information
- Fare zone: 19

History
- Opened: September 25, 1848
- Rebuilt: 1892

Key dates
- December 9, 1891: Station depot burned

Passengers
- 2025: 55 (average weekday)
- Rank: 138 of 153

Services
Preceding station	NJ Transit	Following station
Lebanon toward High Bridge	Raritan Valley Line weekdays	North Branch toward Newark Penn or New York
Former services
Preceding station	Central Railroad of New Jersey	Following station
Lebanon toward Scranton	Main Line	North Branch toward Jersey City
- White House Station
- U.S. National Register of Historic Places
- New Jersey Register of Historic Places
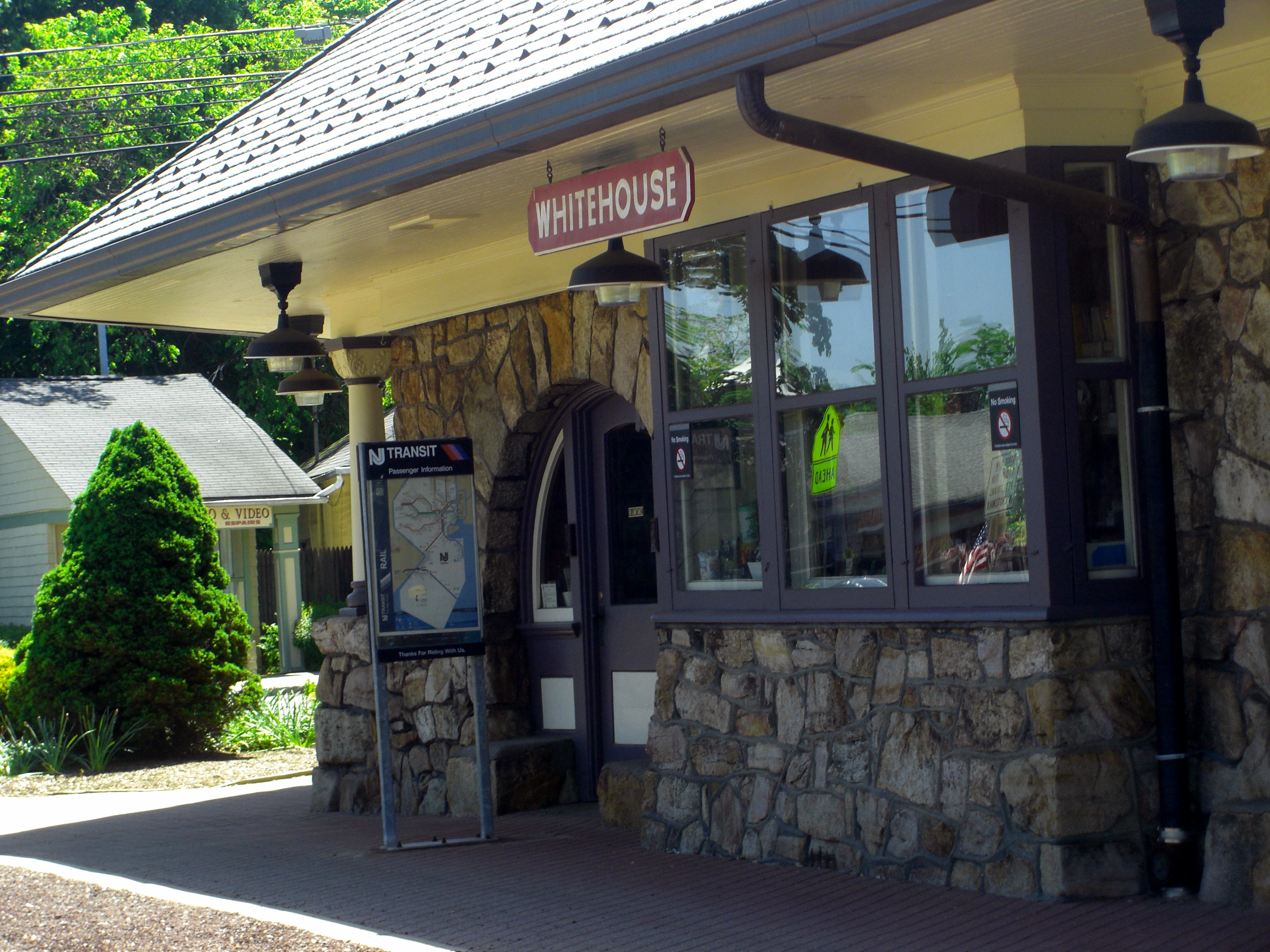
- Interactive map of White House Station
- Location: Main Street, Whitehouse Station, New Jersey
- Coordinates: 40°36′56″N 74°46′15″W
- Area: 0.3 acres (0.1 ha)
- Built: 1892
- Architect: Bradford Lee Gilbert
- Architectural style: Romanesque, Richardsonian Romanesque
- MPS: Operating Passenger Railroad Stations TR
- NRHP reference No.: 84002726
- NJRHP No.: 1628

Significant dates
- Added to NRHP: June 22, 1984
- Designated NJRHP: March 17, 1984
Location

White House station is an active commuter railroad station in the Whitehouse Station section of Readington Township, Hunterdon County, New Jersey. Located at the grade crossing of Main Street (County Route 523), the station services trains of NJ Transit's Raritan Valley Line during peak hours on weekdays only. Trains at White House station go from High Bridge station to Newark Penn Station. All other service terminates at Raritan station in Somerset County. The station consists of a single low-level side platform alongside of a single track. The former Central Railroad of New Jersey depot serves as the Readington Township Library.

Railroad service at White House began on September 25, 1848 with the opening of the Somerville and Easton Railroad from Somerville station to White House, a 10-mile (16 km) extension. The early station depot at White House burned on the evening of December 9, 1891. That was replaced with the current structure in 1892, built in the Richardson Romanesque architectural style by Bradford Gilbert. The station depot at White House was added to the National Register of Historic Places in June 1984 as part of the Operating Passenger Railroad Stations Thematic Resource.

== Station layout ==
The station has a single low-level asphalt side platform. The platform is 201 feet (61 m) long and accommodates two cars.

== See also ==
- National Register of Historic Places listings in Hunterdon County, New Jersey
- Operating Passenger Railroad Stations Thematic Resource (New Jersey)

== Bibliography ==
- Bernhart, Benjamin L. (2004). Historic Journeys By Rail: Central Railroad of New Jersey Stations, Structures & Marine Equipment. Outer Station Project. ISBN 1891402072.
- Readington Township Historic Preservation and Reading Township Museum Committee (2008). Images of America: Readington Township. Arcadia Publishing. ISBN 9780738556796.
