= North Branch station =

NJ Transit rail station

North Branch
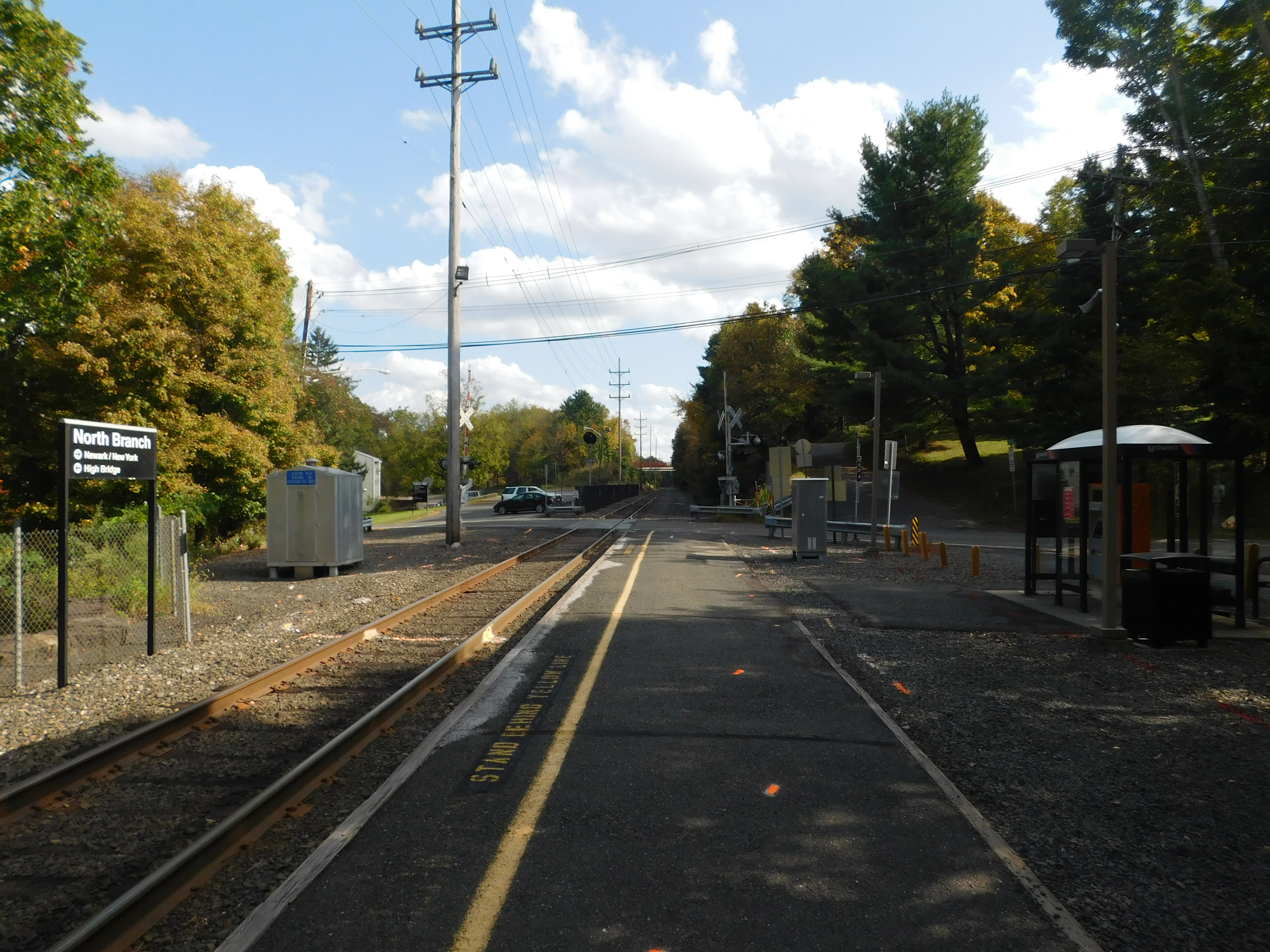
- North Branch station in October 2020.

General information
- Location: Station Road at Central Place, Branchburg, New Jersey
- Coordinates: 40.5922°N 74.6842°W
- Owner: NJ Transit
- Line: Raritan Valley Line
- Distance: 39.4 miles (63.4 km) from Jersey City
- Platforms: 1 side platform
- Tracks: 1

Construction
- Parking: Yes
- Cycle facilities: 1 bicycle rack
- Accessible: No

Other information
- Fare zone: 18

History
- Opened: September 25, 1848
- Rebuilt: 1850, 1860, 1892–1893, 1970

Key dates
- January 8, 1970: Station depot burned

Passengers
- 2025: 30 (average weekday)
- Rank: 147 of 153

Services
Preceding station	NJ Transit	Following station
White House toward High Bridge	Raritan Valley Line weekdays	Raritan toward Newark Penn or New York
Former services
Preceding station	Central Railroad of New Jersey	Following station
White House toward Scranton	Main Line	Raritan toward Jersey City
Location

North Branch station is an active commuter railroad station in the North Branch section of Branchburg, Somerset County, New Jersey. Located at the grade crossing of Station Road in Branchburg, the station serves trains of NJ Transit's Raritan Valley Line during rush hours only between High Bridge station and Newark Penn Station. Most weekday and all weekend Raritan Valley Line trains terminate one station east at Raritan. North Branch station consists of a single low-level asphalt side platform located on the inbound side of the station. The station has a single metal shelter for protection from the elements. A small parking lot is available on the opposite side of the grade crossing.

Railroad service in the area began on September 25, 1848 with the opening of the Somerville and Easton Railroad from Somerville to White House, an extension of 10 miles (16 km). On the morning of January 8, 1970, the station depot at North Branch, which doubled as its local post office, caught fire when the coal boiler/furnace exploded in the basement of building. The station was a complete loss as only the chimney remained of the burned-out structure.

== History ==
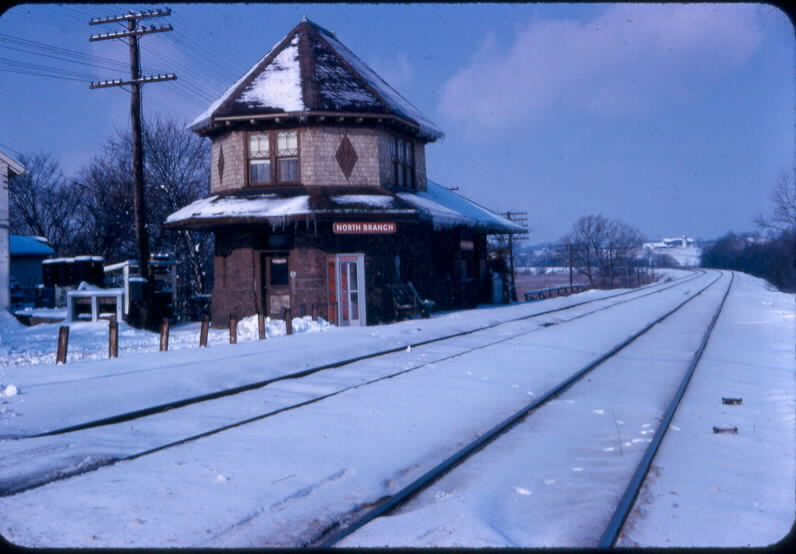
North Branch station depot in 1963

On the morning of January 8, 1970, an explosion rocked the station depot at North Branch station. The fire blew out all the windows in the station, which contained a post office and an apartment for residence. William Strassner, who occupied the apartment in the building was about to refuel the coal furnace boiler in the basement when it exploded. The post office clerk escaped the building and ran to the nearby Bowen Engineering Company offices that were 25 feet (7.6 m) away from the burning depot. One Bowen employee grabbed a fire extinguisher and attempted to put out the flames in the basement to check on Strassner, but were driven back by the hot inferno. He looked around for several minutes to find Strassner, who had escaped the fire. The North Branch Fire Company arrived and found the station depot fully engulfed. However, their attempts to douse the flames were interrupted by low water supply. The company only had their water tanks on the trucks and a small tanker to douse the flames. The tanker had to get water from the Raritan River to help firefighters extinguish the fire. The Green Knoll and Country Hills fire departments assisted with controlling the flames while the Branchburg Rescue Squad came to help the people hurt in the explosion. The station depot collapsed within 30 minutes of the explosion, leaving only a brick fireplace behind. No trains were affected as the last trains had already made their stops at North Branch. All mail from the post office was destroyed along with the 160 post office boxes in the depot. Home delivery was not interrupted as their service was operated from the Somerville post office. The assistant postmaster added that they would not know how much mail was destroyed for several months.

In the weeks following the depot fire, Branchburg Township officials worked on trying to get temporary replacements for the station depot and the post office, both lost in the fire. Mayor Edward Blaufuss told officials on January 20 that they were looking for a temporary location and had a few in mind. The fire company, which helped eliminate the fire, was asked about the possibility of using some of their structure to be used as a post office. Blaufuss also wrote federal officials, including the postmaster general, on getting a new post office established in North Branch. He added that a Branchburg resident with a connection to officials in Philadelphia, Pennsylvania that could help the municipality. With the demolition of the station depot and post office, all people who wanted to use post office box service had to drive to Somerville.Blaufuss also wrote a letter to the Central Railroad of New Jersey to see what their plan was to build a new station at North Branch and that if a new station was not gonna be built, his fear that railroad service to the area would be discontinued in its entirety. Blaufuss added that the Raritan station parking lot was not large enough to handle added commuters from North Branch.

In early February 1970, the township added that they were looking at the use of a 1,000-square-foot (93 m^{2}) medical facility near Somerset County College in Branchburg for the new post office. William Jones, the owner of the structure, offered the building to the community in return, which Blaufuss was impressed with. Blaufuss added that the Somerville post office lacked proper parking and made it tough on those who commuted to check their post office box. Blaufuss also noted that he gotten petitions from local residents to get a new post office be built as soon as possible. John Dundon, the chairman of the Branchburg Township Planning Board, stated that he supported the construction of a new post office for the entire municipality. One angry petitioner added that the North Branch Fire Department was slow to respond to the fire, but Blaufuss stated that the emergency button to alert the company was tapped twice, resulting in a false alarm status. The Central Railroad of New Jersey also responded to the letter sent by Blaufuss, adding that the low ridership count, 20 boarding and 26 alighting was not enough to justify them building a new station depot on their own. The railroad stated that they would be willing to put a three sided metal shelter or a trailer to serve as a new station depot. They also suggested that if the municipality wanted to build themselves a new structure the railroad would be fine with it. Dundon added that ridership at North Branch station had tripled since 1967 and that the lack of a station depot would become a hardship on them.

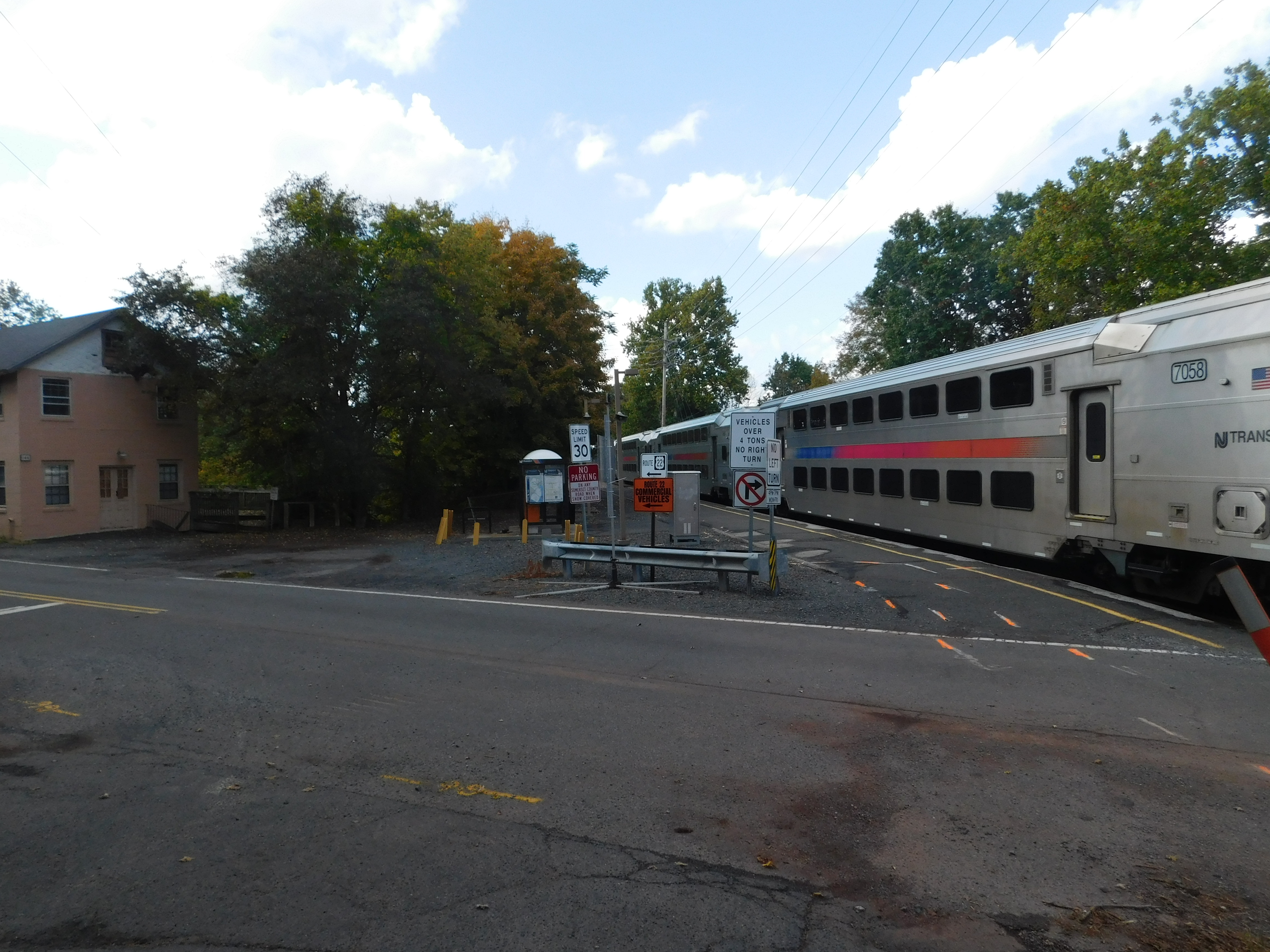
North Branch station and the former Bowen Engineering office building in October 2020

By February 17, the railroad and the municipality came into agreement that they would build a new three-sided shelter at North Branch station, along with a wire fence and a new telephone booth to replace the one on the platform. Blaufuss added that the North Branch Fire Company would consider the municipality's suggestion to build a temporary post office at their headquarters. A month later, Blaufuss added that a proposal to build a station parking lot on the site of the former depot was infeasible due to the construction of the former depot. The North Branch station depot was built on a fake arch and that any proposed parking lot would collapse into the arch during construction. Blaufuss noted that the wire fence was added to prevent people from falling into the false arch themselves. He added that the station depot site was Central Railroad of New Jersey property and the municipality could not take any official actions on their lands.

In mid-June 1970, railroad workers were installing a new three sided station shelter at North Branch station and would be completed within a week after June 16. Blaufuss worked on convincing federal officials on the construction of a new post office for North Branch for local residents, industrial businesses and college students.

In late October 1970, Blaufuss announced that the Jones property on Old Route 28 near Somerset County College would serve as the new post office in Branchburg, with the municipality leasing the building. Blaufuss announced that the post office would begin operation on November 14 and operated by crew members of the post office in Somerville. However, the new post office did not open until December 10, 1970.

== Station layout ==
The station has a single low-level asphalt side platform. The platform is 192 feet (59 m) long and accommodates a single car.
