= Annandale station =

NJ Transit rail station

Annandale
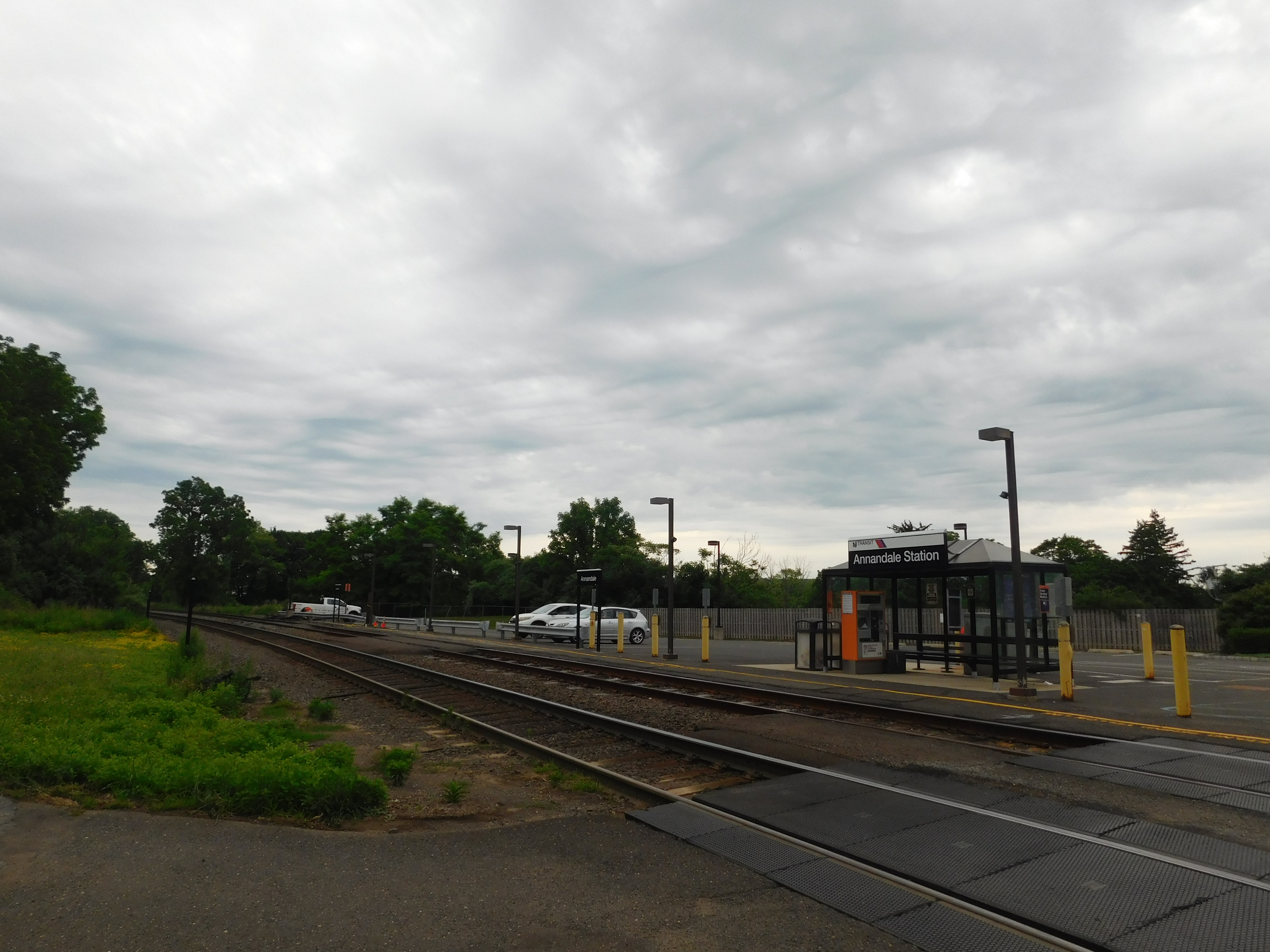
- Annandale station in June 2026.

General information
- Location: 46 East Street; Annandale, New Jersey
- Coordinates: 40.6451°N 74.8789°W
- Owner: New Jersey Transit
- Line: Raritan Valley Line
- Distance: 50.4 miles (81.1 km) from Jersey City
- Platforms: 1 side platform
- Tracks: 1

Construction
- Parking: 104 spaces
- Accessible: No

Other information
- Fare zone: 20

History
- Opened: July 4, 1852
- Rebuilt: October 1899–1900; November 16, 1934–November 1935
- Former names: Clinton (July 4, 1852–1873)

Key dates
- September 2, 1934: Station depot burned
- October 1970: Station agent removed

Passengers
- 2025: 71 (average weekday)
- Rank: 131 of 153

Services
Preceding station	NJ Transit	Following station
High Bridge Terminus	Raritan Valley Line weekdays	Lebanon toward Newark Penn or New York
Former services
Preceding station	Central Railroad of New Jersey	Following station
High Bridge toward Scranton	Main Line	Lebanon toward Jersey City
Location

Annandale is a commuter railroad station in the Annandale section of Clinton Township in Hunterdon County, New Jersey. Located north of exit 18 of Interstate 78 at the junction of Main Street, Main Street Extension and East Street, the station serves trains of NJ Transit's Raritan Valley Line, which runs between High Bridge and Newark Penn Station. The next station to the west is the stop at High Bridge, while the next station to the east is Lebanon. The station contains a single low-level asphalt side platform and a single ticket vending machine in the shelter.

Train service through Annandale came in 1852, when the Central Railroad of New Jersey constructed tracks through Clinton Township. Known as Clinton, the railroad had four locals move westward from White House to help build the new village in the area. For a short time, Annandale was the terminus of the line. The station opened on July 4, 1852, with passenger service to Easton, Pennsylvania. The first depot was replaced in 1900, with a new structure that caught fire in September 1934. The freight station at Annandale, constructed c. 1865, was razed in 1960.

Ticket service at the Annandale depot ended in October 1970, as the station agent there and at nearby Hampton were eliminated in favor of warming shelters for passengers, who were commuting as far as Allentown, Pennsylvania to use the station. The station depot constructed in 1934 was razed in 1983.

== History ==
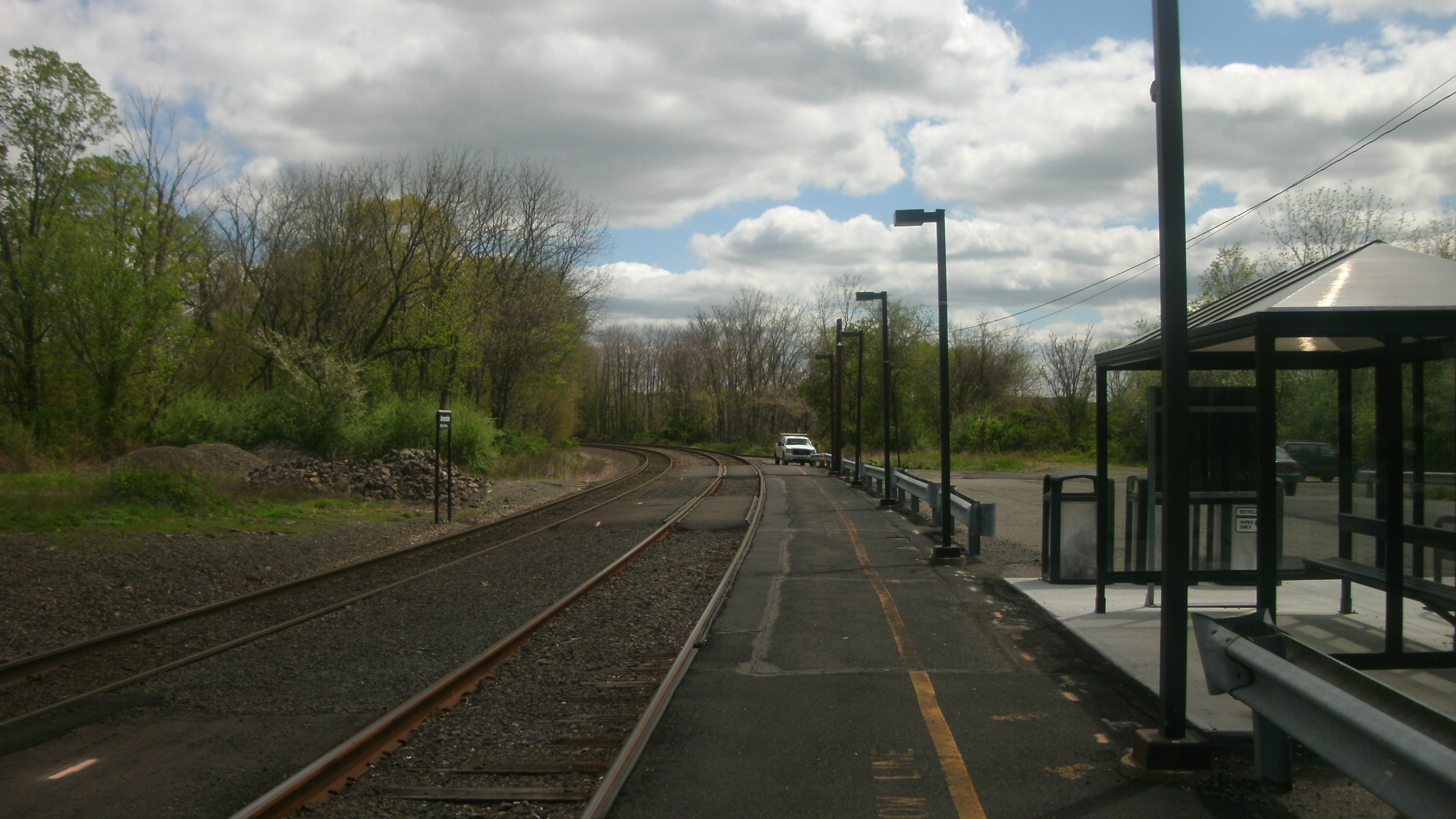
Annandale station in April 2011

The Central Railroad of New Jersey, a conglomerate of the Somerville and Easton Railroad and the Elizabeth and Somerville Railroad, constructed tracks through Clinton Township in 1852. The railroad constructed the railroad through here as a temporary terminus. As a result, they built a new turntable in town so they could turn trains around back to Jersey City. The tracks through Clinton were completed on June 20, 1852. When the railroad was completed, the agent at White House station, George Frech, picked up and moved to Clinton Station. Along with merchant Jacob Young, N.N. Boeman, a local tavern keeper, and railroad employees James Kenna and Thomas Kinney, Frech helped move and settle the area around Clinton Station. The station depot was completed in 1852 while passenger service began on July 4, 1852, to Easton. Frech, serving as station agent, moved into the depot. The station built at Annandale was of a wooden design, two stories with a long overhang roof. The structure also had 2 chimneys for warming the structure.

When the railroad was completed, the village around Clinton Station began to expand. Boeman added a local tavern to the area on the first village lot, controlling it until 1879. Jacob Young constructed a local trading store around Clinton Station and soon added a grain house to the area. Kinney and Kenna became residents and began working for the railroad through town. In 1873, John T. Johnston, the president of the Central Railroad of New Jersey, requested the name of Clinton Station be changed to Annandale when prodded about the name. He chose the name based on his home town of Annandale in Scotland.

Annandale during this time had an abundance of limestone and lime mines through the area that benefitted from the construction of the railroad. During the 1800s, the lime and limestones were mined through the railroad, along with nearby lumber yards that prospered due to their locations near the rail line.

== Station layout ==
The station has a single low-level asphalt side platform. The platform is 203 feet (62 m) long and accommodates two cars.

== Bibliography ==
- Bernhart, Benjamin L. (2004). Historic Journeys By Rail: Central Railroad of New Jersey Stations, Structures & Marine Equipment. Outer Station Project. ISBN 1891402072.
- Snell, James P. (1881). History of Hunterdon and Somerset Counties, New Jersey: With Illustrations and Biographical Sketches of Its Prominent Men and Pioneers. Everts and Peck.
