= Raritan station =

NJ Transit rail station

Raritan
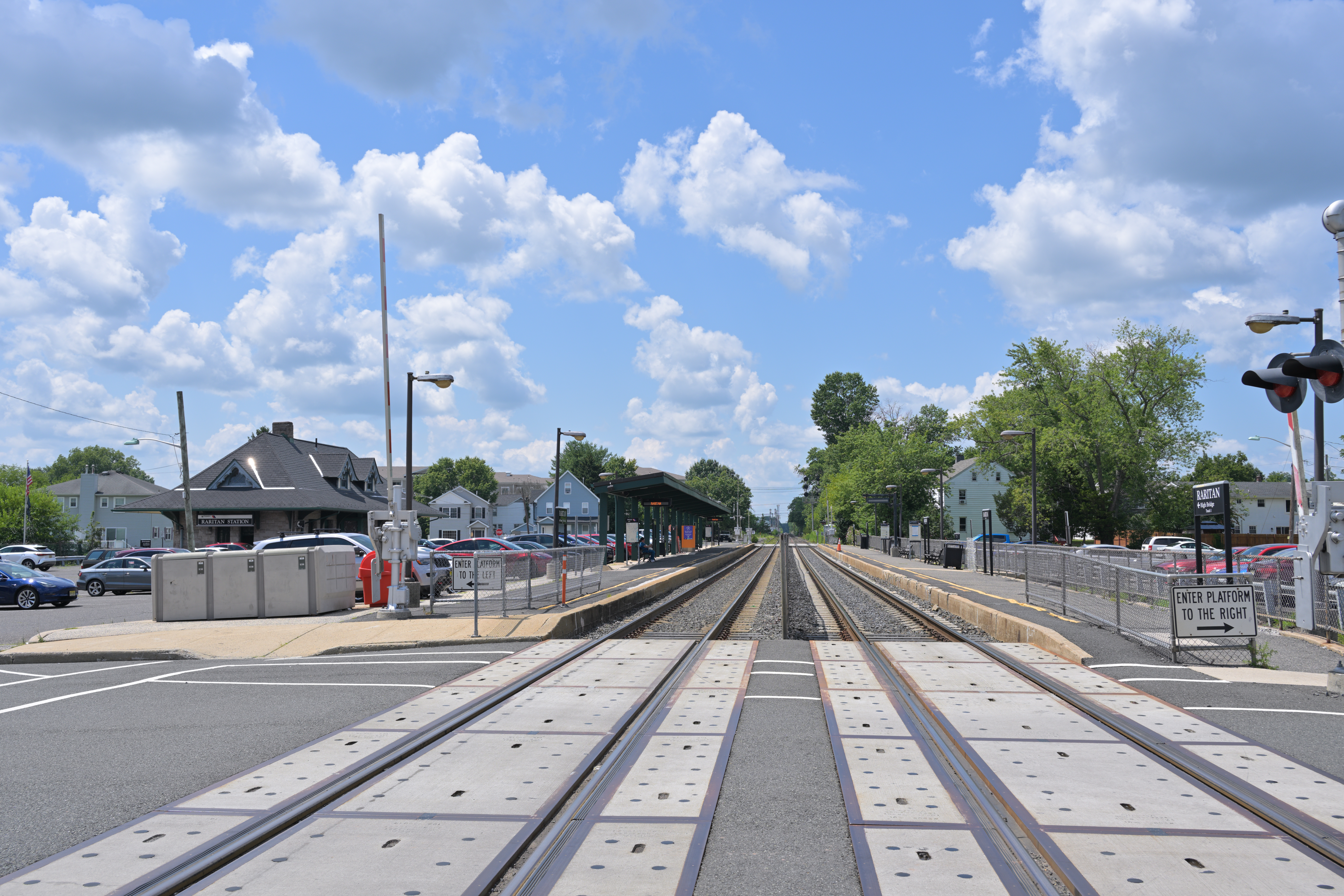
- Raritan station in 2026 from the eastern end. The former Central Railroad of New Jersey depot is on the left.

General information
- Location: 20 Railroad Avenue, Raritan, New Jersey
- Coordinates: 40.5707°N 74.6344°W
- Owner: New Jersey Transit
- Line: Raritan Valley Line
- Distance: 35.9 miles (57.8 km) from Jersey City
- Platforms: 2 side platforms
- Tracks: 2

Construction
- Accessible: No
- Architectural style: Late Gothic Revival, Richardsonian Romanesque, other

Other information
- Fare zone: 17

History
- Opened: c. 1851
- Rebuilt: July 1891–1892; April 23, 1987–May 3, 1988

Passengers
- 2025: 449 (average weekday)
- Rank: 62 of 153

Services
Preceding station	NJ Transit	Following station
North Branch weekdays toward High Bridge	Raritan Valley Line	Somerville toward Newark Penn or New York
Former services
Preceding station	Central Railroad of New Jersey	Following station
North Branch toward Scranton	Main Line	Somerville toward Jersey City
- Raritan Station
- U.S. National Register of Historic Places
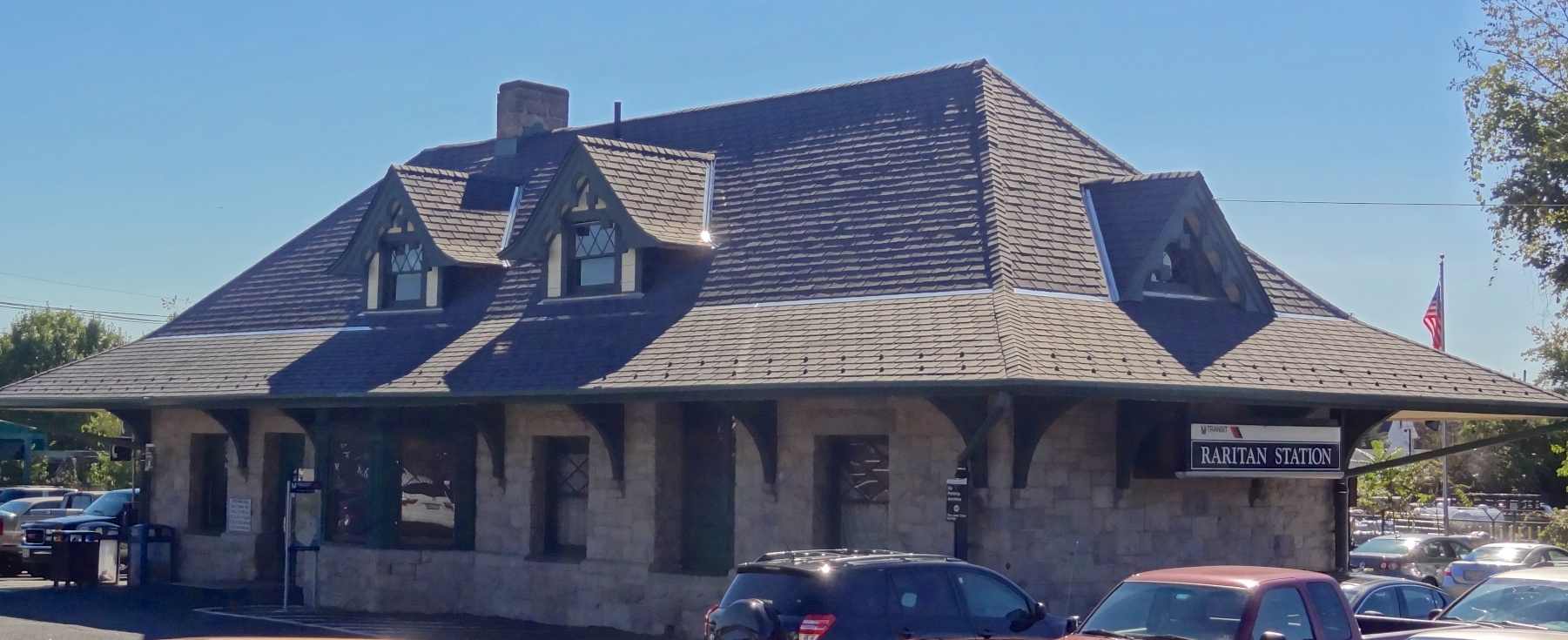
- Interactive map of Raritan Station
- Area: 1 acre (0.4 ha)
- MPS: Operating Passenger Railroad Stations TR
- NRHP reference No.: 84002824
- Added to NRHP: June 22, 1984
Location

Raritan station is an active commuter railroad station in the borough of Raritan, Somerset County, New Jersey. Located between the crossings of Anderson Street and Thompson Street, the station serves trains of NJ Transit's Raritan Valley Line. Raritan station serves as the western terminus of all weekend and off-peak service on the line. Trains at all other times continue west to High Bridge station in Hunterdon County. NJ Transit operates a yard three blocks west of Raritan station to service trains. Raritan station consists of two low-level side platforms that service the two tracks in the station. The inbound platform contains a canopy to protect riders from the rain. The former Central Railroad of New Jersey depot sits in the parking lot between Anderson and Thompson.

The station building has been listed in the state and federal registers of historic places since 1984 and is part of the Operating Passenger Railroad Stations Thematic Resource. It houses the local VFW Post inside. A small section is still open during the winter with heaters so passengers do not have to wait outside.

== Station layout ==
The station has two low-level side platforms serving two tracks. The inbound platform is slightly longer than the outbound platform at 393 feet (120 m) vs 377 feet (115 m). Both can accommodate four cars.

== See also ==
- List of New Jersey Transit stations
