= Wilkes-Barre station =

Historic American railway station in Luzerne County, Pennsylvania

Wilkes-Barre
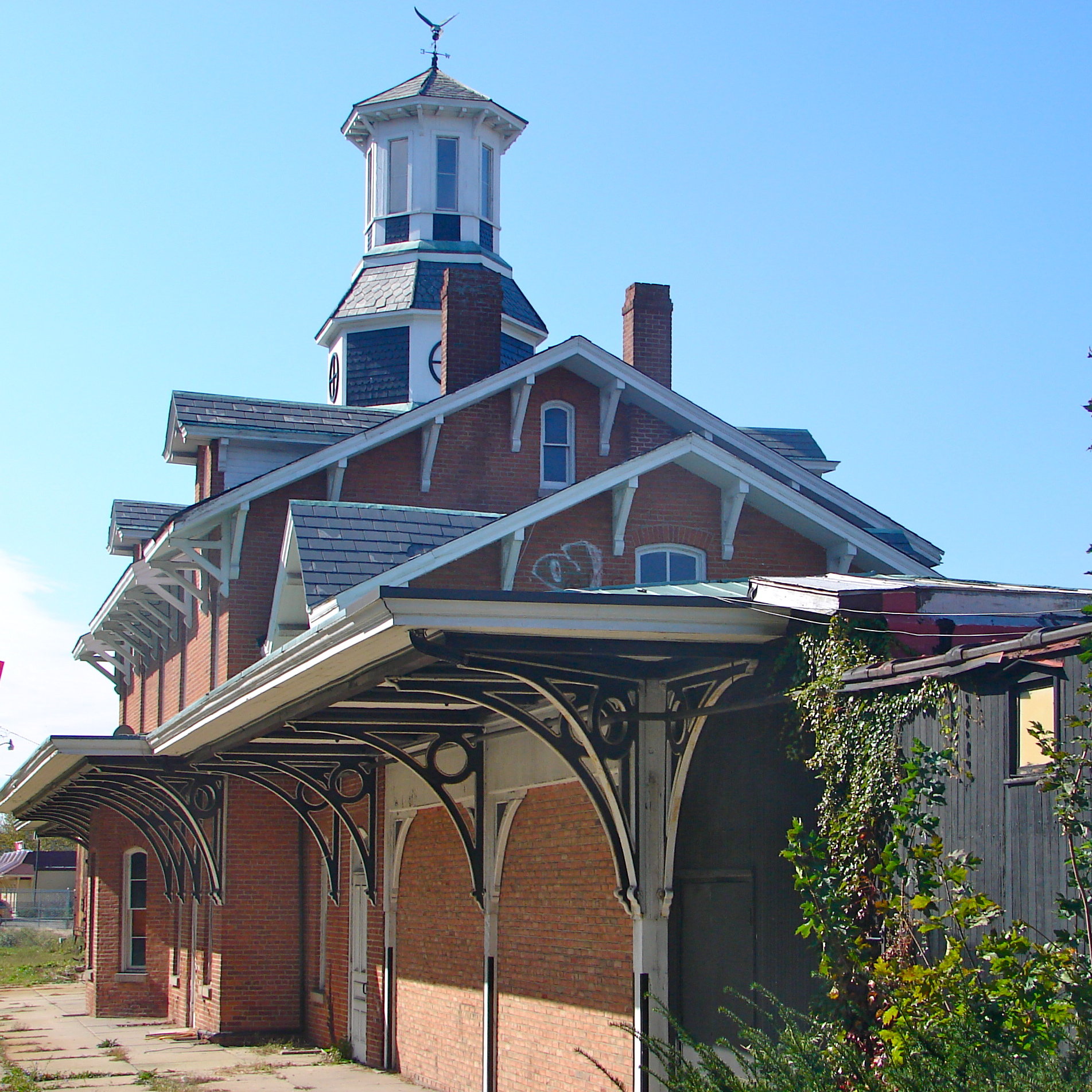
- Central Railroad of New Jersey Station, October 2011

General information
- Location: 31-35 South Baltimore Street, Wilkes-Barre, Pennsylvania
- Coordinates: 41°14′31″N 75°52′47″W
- System: Central Railroad of New Jersey Station
- Tracks: 2

Construction
- Accessible: No

History
- Opened: 1868
- Closed: 1963 (Passenger); 1972 (Freight)

Former services
Preceding station	Central Railroad of New Jersey	Following station
Scranton Terminus	Main Line	Mauch Chunk toward Jersey City
Parsons toward Scranton	Main Line	Ashley toward Jersey City
- Central Railroad of New Jersey Station
- U.S. National Register of Historic Places
- Location within Pennsylvania Location within the United States
- Area: 1 acre (0.40 ha)
- Built: 1868
- Architect: Central Railroad of New Jersey
- NRHP reference No.: 75001652
- Added to NRHP: May 12, 1975
Location

The Central Railroad of New Jersey Station is an historic railway station in Wilkes-Barre, Luzerne County, Pennsylvania, United States.

It was added to the National Register of Historic Places in 1975.

== History and architectural features ==
Built in 1868 by the Central Railroad of New Jersey, this historic train station is a two-and-one-half-story, brick building with one-and-one-half-story wings on either side. Designed in the Victorian style, it features an overhanging hipped and gable roof, with a large wooden cupola. Passenger service ceased in 1963, and the station closed in 1972.

Wilkes-Barre was also served by another station that hosted Delaware and Hudson Railway, Lehigh Valley Railroad and Pennsylvania Railroad trains. That station was built in 1884 and demolished in 1965.

The Central Railroad of New Jersey Station was added to the National Register of Historic Places in 1975. It was renovated in 2021 to become Luzerne County's new visitors center, which opened in 2022.
