= High Bridge station =

NJ Transit rail station

High Bridge
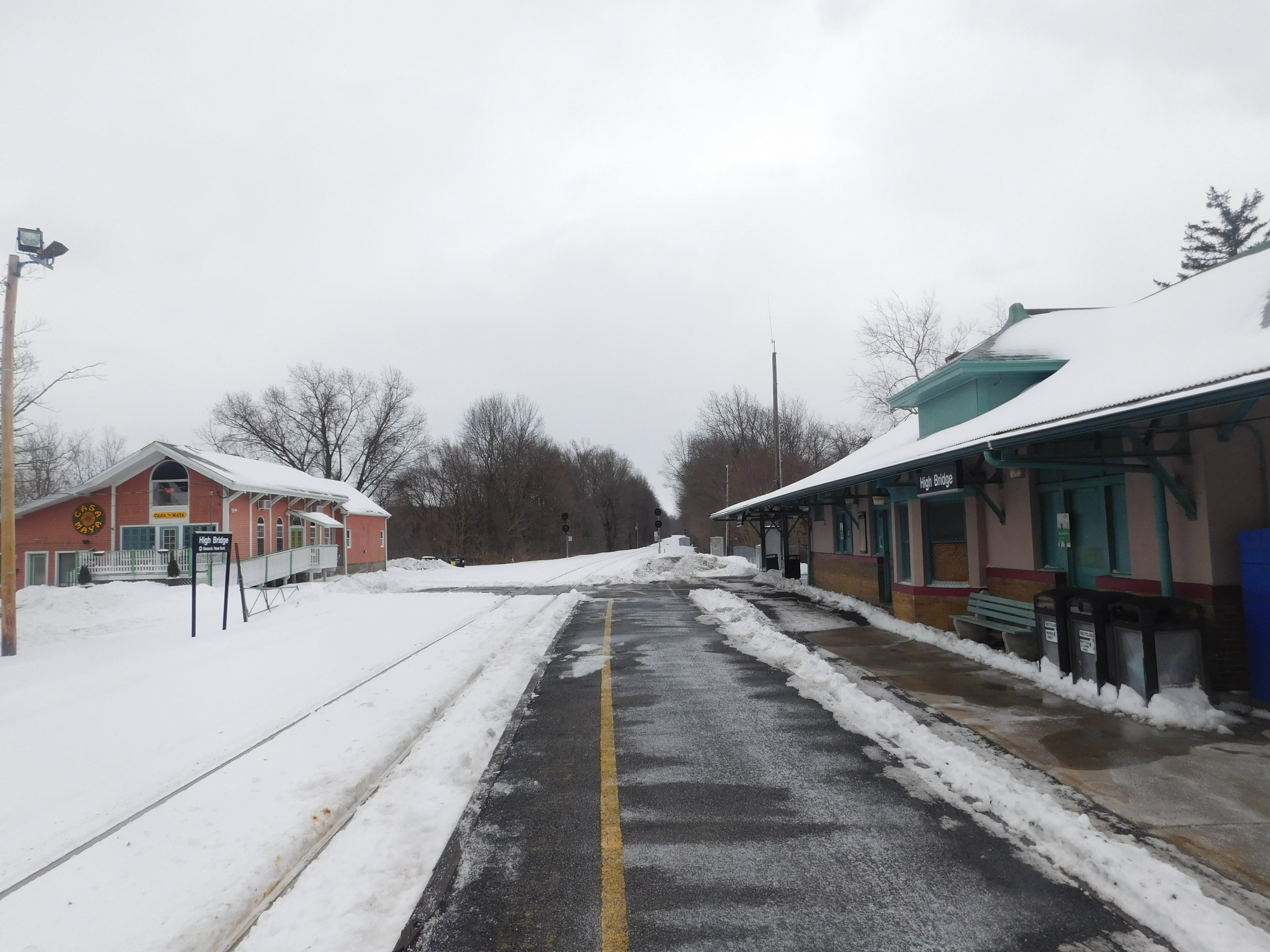
- High Bridge station with the Central Railroad of New Jersey depot on the right in March 2017

General information
- Location: Central Avenue and Bridge Street, High Bridge, New Jersey 08829
- Coordinates: 40.6667°N 74.8960°W
- Owner: New Jersey Transit
- Line: Raritan Valley Line
- Distance: 52.2 miles (84.0 km) from Jersey City
- Platforms: 1 side platform
- Tracks: 1

Construction
- Parking: 44 spaces (40 standard, 4 accessible)
- Cycle facilities: Bicycle racks
- Accessible: No

Other information
- Fare zone: 21

History
- Opened: 1856
- Rebuilt: 1869; 1913

Key dates
- April 1, 1932: Passenger service on High Bridge Branch discontinued

Passengers
- 2025: 43 (average weekday)
- Rank: 143 of 153

Services
Preceding station	NJ Transit	Following station
Terminus	Raritan Valley Line weekdays	Annandale toward Newark Penn or New York
Former services
Preceding station	NJ Transit	Following station
Glen Gardner toward Phillipsburg	Raritan Valley Line Discontinued January 1, 1984	Annandale toward Newark Penn
Preceding station	Central Railroad of New Jersey	Following station
Phillipsburg toward Scranton	Main Line	Annandale toward Jersey City
Glen Gardner toward Scranton	Main Line	Annandale toward Jersey City
Terminus	High Bridge Branch	Hoffmans toward Hopatcong Junction
Location

High Bridge is a railway station in High Bridge, Hunterdon County, New Jersey, United States. The station is the western terminus of the New Jersey Transit's Raritan Valley Line. The next station eastward is Annandale. The parking lot for the station is located one block to the west. The station only uses the southern track for inbound and outbound trains. The former Central Railroad of New Jersey station house, constructed in 1913, is currently used for storage and there is a covered waiting area under the building canopy. This station has no weekend service.

The railroad, and the moniker of High Bridge, was constructed in 1852 through the valley. Despite causing a boom to a local iron works, the railroad did not establish a station in the area until 1856. Until 1983, Raritan Valley service continued westward to Phillipsburg. Limited service and low ridership led NJ Transit to discontinue all service west of High Bridge. Since service ended, there have been repeated investigations and requests for daily service to be extended back to Phillipsburg.

== History ==
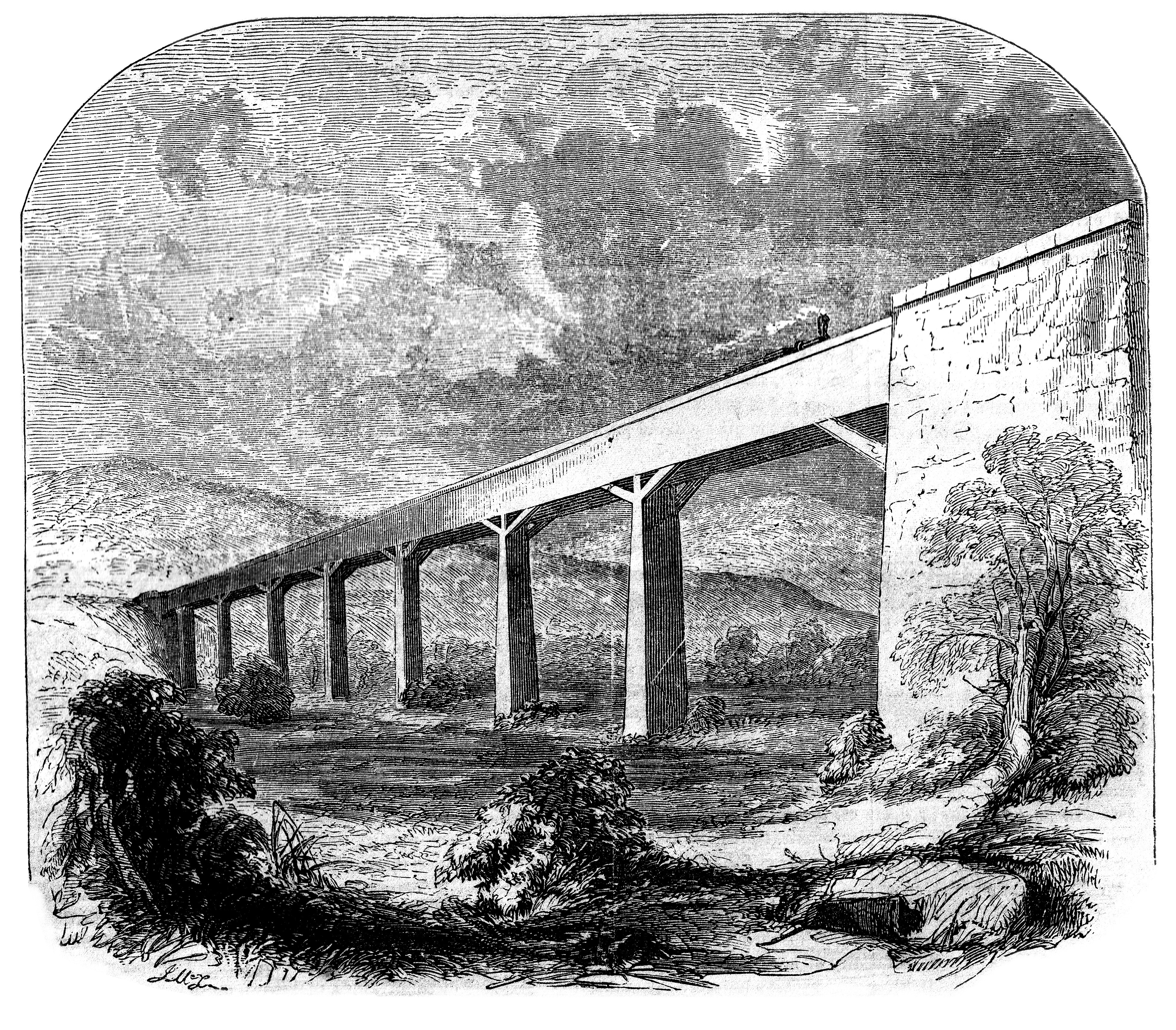
Central Railroad of New Jersey's High Bridge crossing the Raritan River in 1854

The Central Railroad of New Jersey constructed an extension of the former Elizabeth and Somerville Railroad from Clinton in 1852. In order to complete the railroad, it required crossing the Raritan River. The planners decided that a high bridge was the route to go in constructing the line. The railroad constructed a new bridge that was 1,300 feet (400 m) long, 120 feet (37 m) high above the Raritan River. The bridge involved eight massive piers of 100 feet (30 m) stone. The construction of the bridge cost $200,000 (1852 USD), equal to $7,740,000 today.

Construction of the railroad through the valley in 1852 did not involve a station at the current site. Despite the lack of a station, the railroad influenced a renaissance of industry in the area. The railroad construction caused the iron works in the area, run by Lewis Taylor, to gain new business. The iron works, which closed in 1783 due to lack of transportation and access, reopened in 1851. With the railroad, Taylor added new furnaces in 1852 and 1854, as well as new items in 1853 and 1856. With the 1856 expansion of the Taylor-Wharton Iron Works, the village in the area expanded, with a railroad station opened at the location. Taylor himself, opened a company store not far from the new station.

The high bridge through the area did not last very long, however. In 1852, the railroad discovered that the bridge was not firm as the bridge swayed when trains would cross. With the train on top, it would depress the track and make it rise as the equipment crossed the structure. When the railroad decided what to do about the unsafe bridge, they first considered an all-stone structure. That was turned down in favor of filling in the bridge. Construction on the new fill began in 1859. Progress began in 1860, with the large stone piers and the bridge being filled in by dirt. The cost of filling in the bridge cost $500,000 (1865 USD), covering about $60,000 worth of railroad. Filling in two of the bridge's arches cost $80,000 alone. Sidney Dillon, a local contractor, brought one of the first steam shovels in the region to the area to finish the job. The bridge was filled in by 1865.

In 2025 the station received a transit village designation to encourage transit-oriented development in the surrounding area.

== Station layout ==
The station has a single low-level asphalt side platform. The platform is 97 feet (30 m) long and accommodates a single car.

== Bibliography ==
- Bernhart, Benjamin L. (2004). Historic Journeys By Rail: Central Railroad of New Jersey Stations, Structures & Marine Equipment. Outer Station Project. ISBN 1891402072.
- Snell, James P. (1881). History of Hunterdon and Somerset Counties, New Jersey: With Illustrations and Biographical Sketches of Its Prominent Men and Pioneers. Everts and Peck.
