= Scranton station (Central Railroad of New Jersey) =

Former American railroad station

Scranton
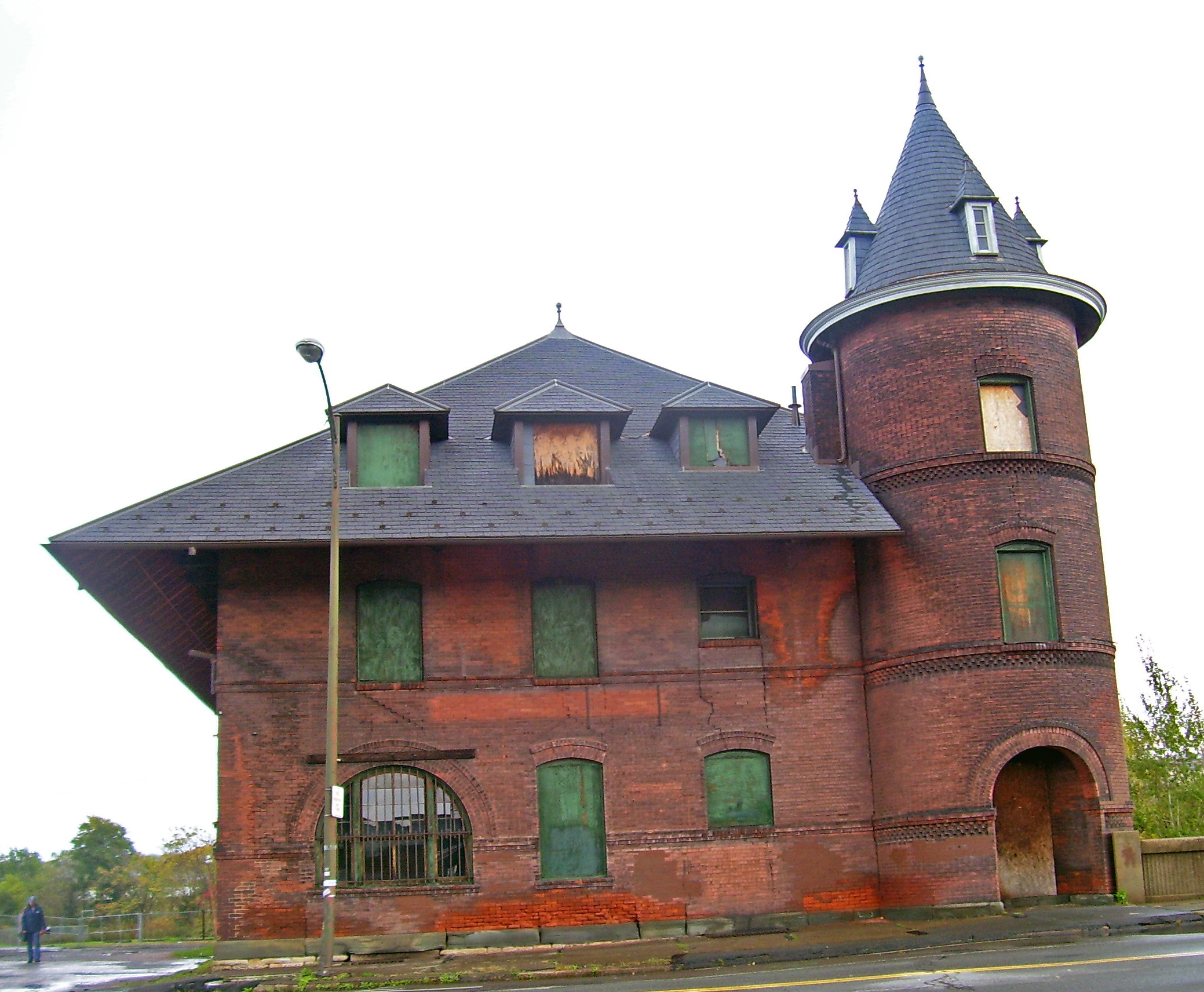
- Vacant station building in 2007

General information
- Location: 602 West Lackawanna Avenue, Scranton, Pennsylvania, U.S.
- Coordinates: 41°24′42″N 75°40′16″W
- System: Central Railroad of New Jersey Station
- Lines: Central Railroad of New Jersey: Lehigh and Susquehanna Division
- Tracks: 2

Construction
- Accessible: No

Former services
Preceding station	Central Railroad of New Jersey	Following station
Terminus	Main Line	Wilkes-Barre toward Jersey City
Terminus	Main Line	Taylor toward Jersey City
Preceding station	New York, Ontario and Western Railway	Following station
Terminus	Scranton – Cadosia	Dickson City toward Cadosia
- Central Railroad of New Jersey; Freight Station
- U.S. National Register of Historic Places
- Built: 1891-1893
- Architect: Wilson Bros.
- Architectural style: Romanesque Châteauesque
- NRHP reference No.: 79002250
- Added to NRHP: 1979
Location

The Central Railroad of New Jersey Freight Station in Scranton, Pennsylvania was the western terminus of the Central Railroad of New Jersey line, 192 miles (309 km) from its base of operations in Jersey City, New Jersey. Located on West Lackawanna Avenue, over the Lackawanna River from downtown Scranton, near Steamtown National Historic Site, it is to be distinguished from the other legacy Scranton station, Delaware, Lackawanna & Western Scranton Station, where service persisted to January 6, 1970.

Additional passenger train stations in Scranton were those of the Delaware and Hudson Railway and the Erie Railroad.

== Historical and architectural significance ==
In the 1880s, the Central Railroad of New Jersey acquired 7 acres of land from the Bridgewater Coal Co. (aka Bridge Coal Co.), situated along the western side of the Lackawanna Bridge avenue in Scranton, Pennsylvania. Designed by Philadelphia architects Wilson Brothers & Co., a planned freight terminal and passenger terminal began construction in 1890. Both freight and passenger terminals opened for service in 1891, although the buildings were not fully completed until 1893.

Influenced heavily by Châteauesque Revival and Romanesque Revival styles, the freight station features a two story brick building, with a turret tower and slate roof, while the passenger station features an ornate tower and platform, with a miniature bronze locomotive nestled atop the tower. The stations are adjacent, being situated across West Lackawanna ave from each other.

The station was a site for trains from Allentown in the south via Wilkes-Barre, to Jim Thorpe in the north. Through trains such as the Philadelphia Flyer, which went south from Scranton via Allentown to Philadelphia, and the Scranton Flyer, making this same route but northbound, or connections were available at Allentown for Jersey City and Philadelphia.

In the early 1900s, the freight station was also used as a storage warehouse for the John T. Porter Co., and it is implied by the Scranton Tribune that the building was not as heavily used for freight purposes during this time.

Service ended at some point between 1950 and 1954.

When the railroad shut down its Pennsylvania-based operations in 1972, during bankruptcy proceedings, the terminal was closed by the Lehigh Valley Railroad, which took it over, and has remained unused since that time.

After operations with the railroad station ceased in 1972, the building was acquired by George P. Abdalla of the Geo. P Abdalla & Co. trucking firm. Being used as an office, the building also became Abdalla Wholesale Fruit Co., where they specialized in banana processing and sales. By hanging bananas in dark rooms and upside down from ropes, the company would ripen the produce and then sell it once ripe.

It was added to the National Register of Historic Places in 1979.

The station also received a Keystone Opportunity Zone designation in 2013, exempting it from most state and local taxes.

== Passenger station fire of 1910 ==
On December 18, 1910, the Central Railroad of New Jersey passenger station caught fire at 4:30 in the morning and was burned to the ground. Determined to be of unknown origin (thought to be an overheated radiator), the fire claimed the passenger station, destroying two passenger locomotives and scorching the paint of three others for an estimated loss of $50,000 (over $1.5 million as of 2024)

Afterwards, the ornate towered platform was replaced with a small wooden station, leaving the only remaining architectural significance to the freight station. It was also noted by the Scranton Tribune that passenger trains were not delayed the next day, as two passenger coaches and a baggage car were utilized as emergency waiting rooms, baggage room and ticket office to get the station in working order. A shipment of tickets was already scheduled to arrive the next morning, and no money, receipts, or important documents were lost in the fire as they were kept stored in the unharmed freight station.

== Current and future use ==
The 4.2 acre property was purchased in 2000 by the Central New Jersey Railroad Station LLP for $400,000. Redevelopment of the site has been in talks since 2002, when the Commonwealth approved a $275,000 Transportation Commission grant for new copper roofing and architectural restoration. At the time, Central New Jersey RR Station LLP project manager and former city councilman Jerry Donahue had claimed the project would need $2.7 million and take until 2003.

The topic was then revisited in October 2006, when the Commonwealth approved a $2 million redevelopment grant for the project. Donahue stated that $1 million has been invested already, and yet again estimated a higher $4.4 million conversion; this time into a four level restaurant-retail complex, set to open in the summer of 2008. The project was delayed however due to reconstruction of the Lackawanna Avenue Bridge, which affected the freight station property.

When the project was revisited once more, Donahue had yet to file for the $2 million grant and instead filed for a $400,000 property acquisition loan, listing the freight station property as collateral. In August 2009, Lackawanna County was also pressuring Donahue, as he owed $8,500 to prevent the sale of his funeral home due to delinquent taxes. Additionally, In October 2009, Fidelity Bank filed a complaint of not receiving payment, and in January the property was set to be sold in the March 2010 sheriffs auction. Only a few days before the auction, the listing was pulled as Donahue had fulfilled his payment to the bank to prevent the sale.

As of today, the freight station sits vacant on its lot, with the worn, painted sign of "Geo. P. Abdalla & Co." still standing. Per the City of Scranton’s Parcel GIS, the land is still under ownership by the Central New Jersey RR Station LLP.

== See also ==
- Wilson Brothers & Company
- List of stations on the Central Railroad of New Jersey
