= Metuchen station =

NJ Transit rail station

Metuchen
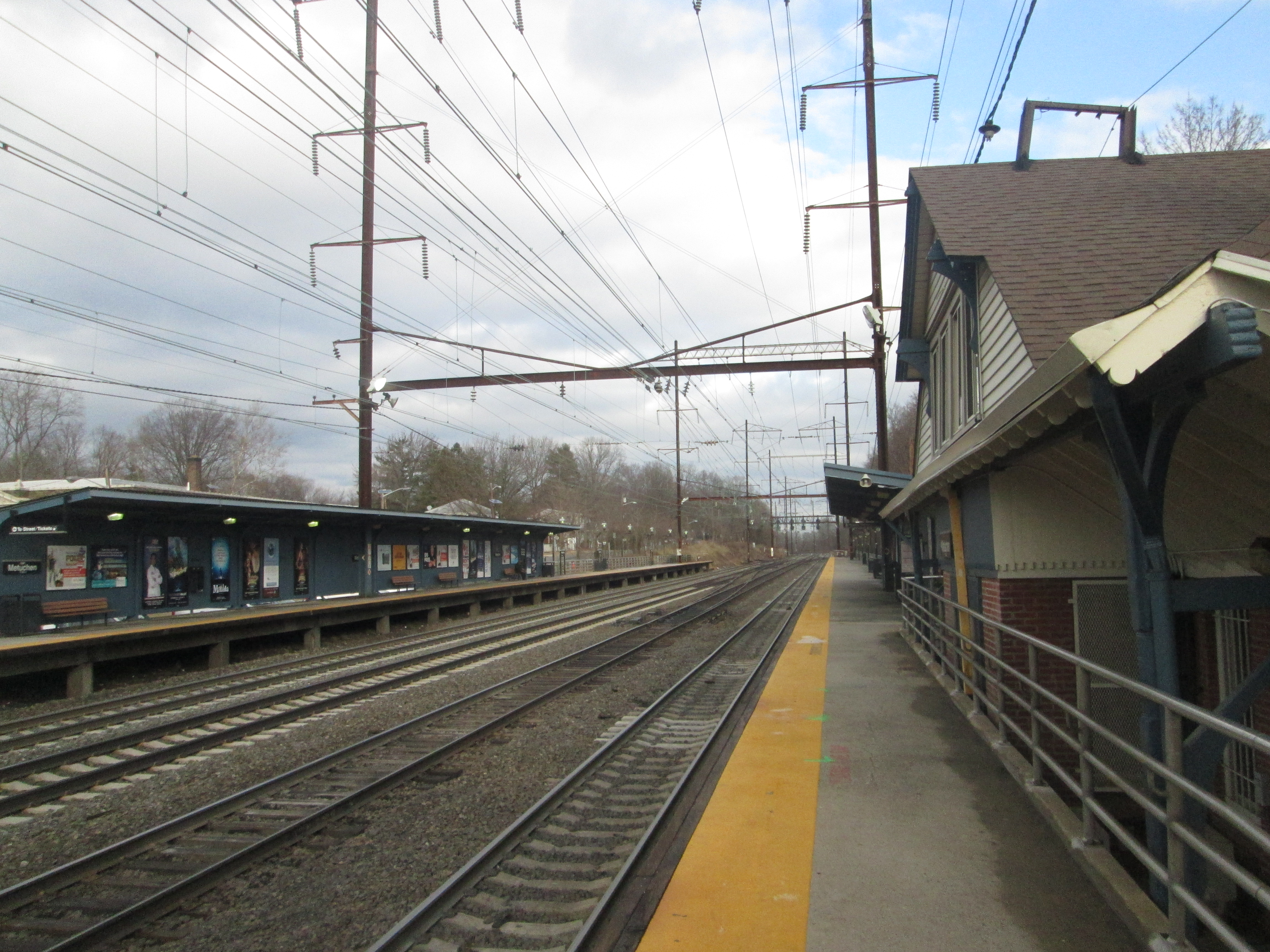
- Looking towards New York on the inbound platform.

General information
- Location: Main Street and Woodbridge Avenue; Metuchen, New Jersey; United States
- Coordinates: 40°32′26.70″N 74°21′37.22″W
- Owner: New Jersey Transit
- Line: Amtrak Northeast Corridor
- Platforms: 2 side platforms
- Tracks: 4
- Connections: NJ Transit Bus: 810, 813, 819

Construction
- Accessible: Yes

Other information
- Fare zone: 11

History
- Opened: July 11, 1836
- Rebuilt: 1850s, 1870s,1888, 1978–1979
- Electrified: December 8, 1932

Key dates
- October 26, 1975: Amtrak service discontinued

Passengers
- 2025: 2014 (average weekday)
- Rank: 16 of 153

Services
Preceding station	NJ Transit	Following station
Edison toward Trenton	Northeast Corridor Line	Metropark toward New York
Former services
Preceding station	Pennsylvania Railroad	Following station
Edison toward Chicago	Main Line	Rahway toward New York or Exchange Place
Edison toward New Brunswick	New Brunswick Line	Menlo Park toward New York or Exchange Place
Terminus	Bonhampton Branch	Bonhampton Terminus
Location

Metuchen station is an active commuter railroad train station in the borough of Metuchen, Middlesex County, New Jersey in the United States. Trains at Metuchen station are serviced by New Jersey Transit's Northeast Corridor Line between Trenton Transit Center or Jersey Avenue and New York Penn Station. The next station to the south is Edison while the next station to the north is Metropark. Amtrak services cross through the station without stopping. The station consists of two side platforms with a wooden station depot on the northbound tracks. Metuchen's station depot and the New York-bound platform are accessible from Woodbridge Avenue (County Route 660) while the Trenton-bound platform comes from Main Street (County Route 531). There is no station agent at Metuchen station, however ticket vending machines are available.

== History ==
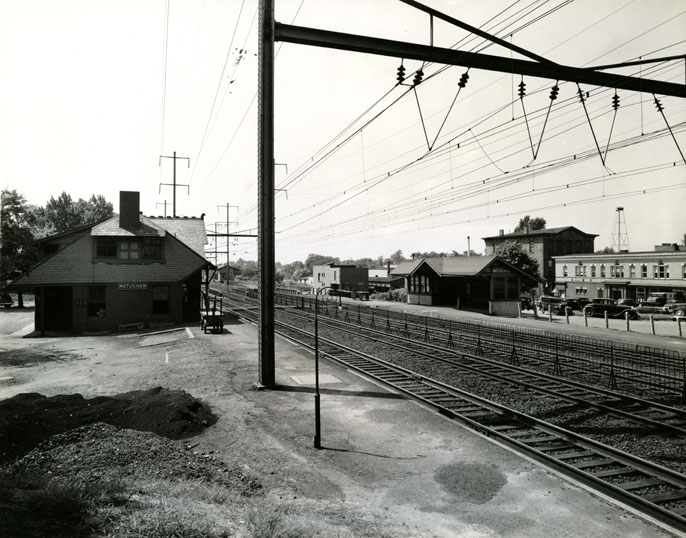
Metuchen station, c. 1940

Metuchen station opened on July 11, 1836 with the completion of the New Jersey Railroad to East Brunswick (location of modern-day Highland Park). The railroad built a station depot at Main Street by 1850. When the Lehigh Valley Railroad opened their line in the 1870s, the Pennsylvania Railroad moved Metuchen station to the Lake Avenue crossing to provide connection to the new railroad. The railroad moved Metuchen station one last time, to the current location in 1888. A secondary station in Metuchen existed from 1879 to 1911 known as Robinvale. Robinvale station burned twice: once on February 28, 1915, and once on March 27, 1915. Amtrak serviced Metuchen station from its inception on May 1, 1971 until October 26, 1975.

Following the September 11 attacks, Metuchen built a small, permanent memorial named Freedom Plaza at the corner of Main Street and Woodbridge Avenue, adjacent to the station's parking lot, consisting of a Verdin clock and the engraved names of all 701 victims from New Jersey.

== Station layout ==
The station has two high-level side platforms. Amtrak services along the Northeast Corridor bypass Metuchen station.
