= Edison station =

NJ Transit rail station

Edison
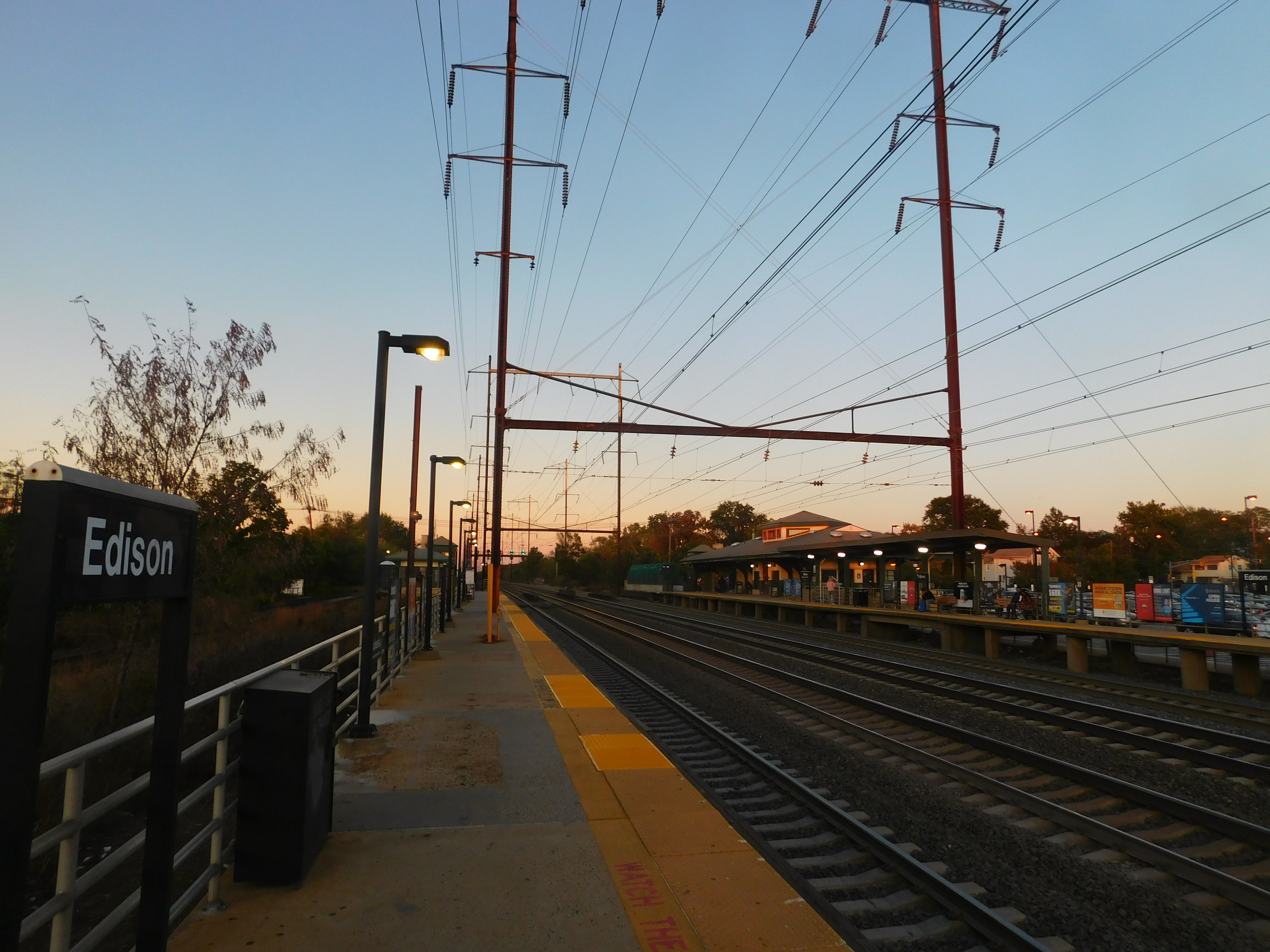
- Looking toward Metuchen from the Trenton-bound platform at Edison station in October 2019.

General information
- Location: 360 Plainfield Avenue (CR 529); Edison, New Jersey; United States
- Coordinates: 40°31′09″N 74°24′39″W
- Owner: New Jersey Transit
- Line: Amtrak Northeast Corridor
- Platforms: 2 side platforms
- Tracks: 4

Construction
- Accessible: Yes

Other information
- Fare zone: 13

History
- Rebuilt: August 1997–March 1, 2000
- Electrified: December 8, 1932
- Former names: Stelton (November 1870–October 29, 1956)

Key dates
- October 1958: Station agency closed
- October 1963: Station depot razed
- January 1, 2010: Parking expansion opened

Passengers
- 2025: 1696 (average weekday)
- Rank: 20 of 153

Services
Preceding station	NJ Transit	Following station
New Brunswick toward Trenton	Northeast Corridor Line	Metuchen toward New York
Former services
Preceding station	Pennsylvania Railroad	Following station
New Brunswick toward Chicago	Main Line	Metuchen toward New York or Exchange Place
New Brunswick Terminus	New Brunswick Line	Metuchen toward New York or Exchange Place
Location

Edison is a commuter railroad station in the Stelton section of Edison, Middlesex County, New Jersey, United States. Located at the intersection of Plainfield Avenue (CR 529) and Central Avenue, the station is served by New Jersey Transit's Northeast Corridor Line. Amtrak trains cross through but bypass the station. Edison station contains two side platforms, both high-level for handicap accessibility under the Americans with Disabilities Act of 1990 (accessible). The next station north, towards New York Penn Station is Metuchen while the next station south, with service towards Jersey Avenue station in New Brunswick and Trenton Transit Center is New Brunswick.

The station was originally constructed c. 1870 at Central Avenue and Plainfield Avenue and named Stelton after the Stelle family, early settlers in Piscatawaytown who arrived in the area in the 1660s. The Pennsylvania Railroad renamed the station to Edison on October 29, 1956, as part of the changing of names in Edison to reflect the newly honored Thomas Alva Edison. The railroad discontinued its ticket and freight agent at Edison in October 1958. The railroad razed the brick station depot at Edison in October 1963. The station depot had burned and was in poor shape prior to its demolition.

== History ==
=== Original construction ===
The land on which Edison station stands was acquired by Augustus Stelle, a descendent of the Stelle family. Augustus Stelle served as a clerk at the Piscataway Baptist Church in Piscatawaytown. He also became a local entrepreneur and became prominent in the community. Stelle acquired the property around what is now Edison station and was focused on building a village around the station.

=== Station rename (1954–1956) ===
Suburban development leading to growth in the renamed Edison Township led to a drive to improve facilities for both the post office and Stelton station. Locals wanted a new central post office while Mayor James C. Forgione focused on the railroad station. Forgione stated that he wanted the Pennsylvania Railroad to improve service at the station, because the parking lots at the station reduced the pressure on stations at New Brunswick and Metuchen. Forgione urged commuters to increase their use of the station in order to make the business case for the Pennsylvania Railroad to increase service.

The township had room for increased suburban growth and felt that the railroad station would be the impetus for the development. By 1955, population had reached 30,000 and predictions showed 60,000 by 1975. Previous plans dating back to 1930 were to have a plaza built around the station, but fell apart when a local landowner felt the township was lowballing an offer for their property and the Great Depression eliminated any other further progress. Forgione felt that a new station was necessary for some of the new developments popping up nearby. The idea of a new parking lot for parking for 400 cars and a pedestrian bridge crossing the tracks would attract commuters from Highland Park and Piscataway as well. The township also pressured the Pennsylvania Railroad to start considering park and ride stations as the older stations struggle to provide parking.

As part of this, Forgione wanted the station to be renamed Edison. At a meeting held on January 7, 1955, Forgione held a meeting at the Pines Manor to get both a post office and railroad station named Edison. The Edison Forum Club joined the drive that night, noting that they could get a new post office by renaming the Stelton post office Edison rather than building a new central one. They also signed on supporting the rename of the station. The post office changed names to Edison on August 1, 1955.

By November 1955, the Women of Edison, who was the organization that ran the campaign to change the name from Raritan Township to Edison Township, endorsed the idea of a station name change. Charles and Johanna Wira, who ran the organization, worked with new Mayor Thomas J. Swales to open communication with the railroad.

On April 23, 1956, the Forum Club, Women for Edison and township officials were notified by the railroad officials that the station name would be changed on September 30, pending approval of state government officials. The railroad noted that the agreement of the name change was done in sympathy of the local groups' demands. The approval of the New Jersey Public Utilities Commission came in May. The railroad told Swales and Wira that the change would be concurrent with the change of timetables for the winter 1956–1957 season.

Officials announced on October 27 that they would be holding ceremonies for the station rename on October 29. Swales, members of the civic organizations and members of the Township Planning Board and Zoning Commissions would be in attendance. As part of the station rename, the railroad switch tower in Metuchen, named "Edison Tower" was renamed "Lincoln". The station rename ceremony occurred on October 29, with Swales posting the new station sign himself in front of Johanna Wira and Park Roeper, the official with the railroad who the township worked with.

=== 21st Century ===
In early 2005 plans were announced to expand the station, notably with the addition of 800 parking spaces. A new parking lot with 477 spaces opened on January 1, 2010.

Edison Township formerly operated the Edison Light Shuttle, a commuter jitney connecting the station with nearby residential developments, but the service was discontinued in 2011 due to lack of funding. However, in Mayor Sam Joshi's 2023 State of the Township address, he announced plans to restart the service.

As part of the 2020 NJ Transit Capital Plan, the station will have its platforms extended to the west to accommodate 12-car trains, allowing all cars to platform at the station. The switch to the freight siding behind the Trenton-bound platform would be relocated to the east of the station to allow for the platform extension. The existing platform sections would be replaced. The project is estimated to cost $36 million.

== Station layout ==
The station has two high-level side platforms. Most of Amtrak's Northeast Corridor services bypass the station via the inner tracks. Behind the Trenton-bound platform lies one freight track which merges with the Northeast Corridor just southwest of the station. The freight track eventually leads to several warehouses south of Brunswick Avenue.

== Bibliography ==
- Ross, Peter; Hedley, Fenwick Y. (1902). The New Jersey Coast in Three Centuries - History of the New Jersey Coast with Genealogical and Historic Biographical Appendix - Volume 3. New York, New York: The Lewis Publishing Company.
