= North Brunswick station =

Proposed train station in New Jersey, US

North Brunswick

General information
- Location: North Brunswick, NJ
- Coordinates: 40.438°N 74.498°W
- Owner: New Jersey Transit
- Line: Northeast Corridor
- Platforms: 1 island (initial)
- Tracks: 2

Construction
- Parking: Yes
- Cycle facilities: Yes

Other information
- Fare zone: 14

History
- Opened: TBA

Services
Preceding station	NJ Transit	Following station
Princeton Junction toward Trenton	Northeast Corridor Line	Jersey Avenue toward New York
Location

North Brunswick is a proposed railroad station along the Northeast Corridor (NEC) in North Brunswick, New Jersey, that will be built by New Jersey Transit Rail Operations (NJT) to serve its Northeast Corridor Line. Approved in 2013, it was originally planned to open in 2018 and projected to cost $30 million. It is one of several projects along the "New Jersey Speedway" section of the NEC.

The station was proposed for the former Johnson & Johnson facility on Route 1 and Aaron Road by the new owners of the 212-acre (86 ha) site, and is part of a transit-oriented development known as Main Street North Brunswick, New Jersey Transit's Fiscal 2015 capital budget allocated funding for the station. which has been designated a transit-oriented development, or "transit village".

As of mid-2017, construction of the project had not begun. In October 2017, it was announced the project had received $50 million from the Transportation Trust Fund. In October 2019, NJ Transit and Middlesex County, New Jersey had committed $70 million to start work on the station. In 2021, the Middlesex County Improvement Authority hired WSP USA to design the station. Initial designs were released in March 2023. Construction is slated to begin 2025.

Although station construction had yet to begin, the Main Street North Brunswick transit village has continued to develop, with Costco and Target opening in 2014, Panera Bread opening in 2017, Courtyard by Marriott opening in 2019, Shake Shack opening in 2024, and 100 townhomes fully occupied. It was announced in January 2025 that the North Brunswick Train Station project is advancing toward construction, with over 60% design completion and a 2025 milestone involving funding agreement with NJ Transit.

== Mid-Line Loop and County Yard ==
NJT plans to build a flying junction and balloon loop called the Mid-Line Loop between MP 36 and MP 37 on the NEC south of the new station, allowing trains to turn around and enter and leave service without crossing over tracks, and function as a staging area for a mid-line terminus. NJT originates trains to Newark Penn Station and New York Penn Station during peak hours from the Jersey Avenue station, to the north in New Brunswick.

NJT is creating a "train haven" at County Yard where equipment could be stored during serious storms. The work involves reconfiguring and expanding the yard into the adjacent Mile Run Yard, which is not in service.

As of 2019, construction plans for the new station did not include construction of the mid-line loop.

== High-speed corridor ==
In August 2011, the United States Department of Transportation obligated $450 million to a six-year project to improve 24 miles (39 km) of the Northeast Corridor for a high-speed corridor between New Brunswick and Trenton along what is called the "New Jersey Speedway". The Next Generation High-Speed project is to upgrade electrical power, signals, and overhead catenary wires to improve reliability and increase speed to 160 mph (260 km/h), and with new trains to 186 mph (299 km/h).

== See also ==
- List of New Jersey Transit stations
