= County Yard =

Rail yard in New Jersey, U.S.

Coordinates: 40.479294°N 74.464852°W

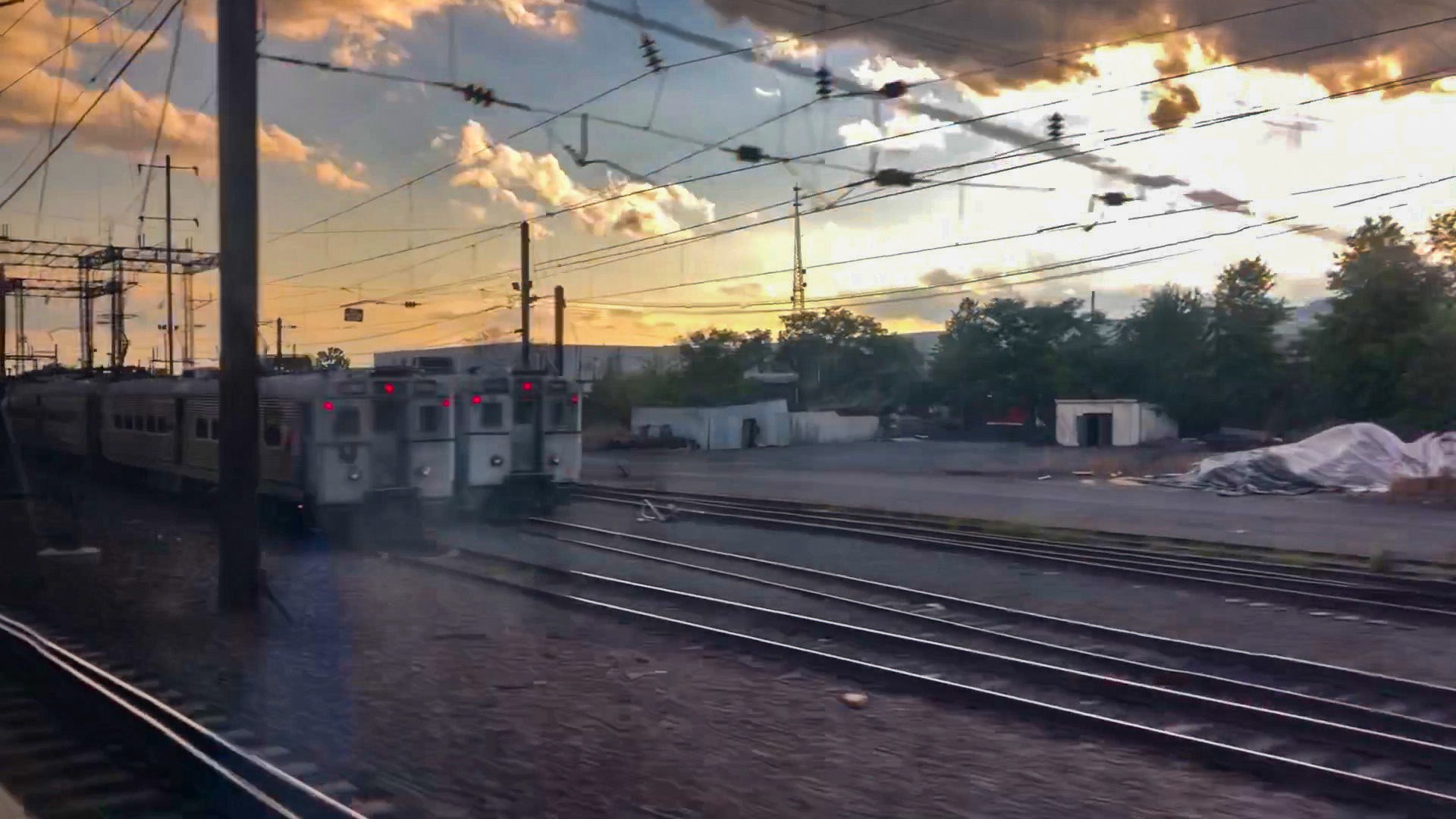
County yard

County Yard is a rail yard complex comprising Adams Yard, Delco Lead, and the eponymous County Yard along the Northeast Corridor (NEC). The complex straddles the New Brunswick and North Brunswick border in Central New Jersey.

Originally developed by the Pennsylvania Railroad, it is owned by Amtrak. The New Jersey Transit Rail Operations (NJT) Jersey Avenue Station (at milepoint 34.4) served by its Northeast Corridor Line, is just south of County Yard, and just north of Adams Yard and Delco Lead. In 2014, NJT began a project to upgrade the yard and build a "train haven" and re-inspection station. County Yard will be able to store 132 rail cars. The aforementioned Delco Lead, further south along NEC, would be expanded to five additional tracks able to park 312 rail cars and a service and inspection facility would be built to return equipment to service.

== History ==
County Yard is just north of Millstone Junction, whereas Adams Yard is just south of Millstone Junction

County Yard was originally part of the Pennsylvania Railroad (PRR) and is located where the Millstone Branch joined its mainline, now the NEC. It was named for Alexander T. County, a vice-president and treasurer who lived in New Brunswick. A new tower and interlocking at "COUNTY" were opened in 1900. Passenger service ended in 1930.

The Jersey Avenue Park & Ride station opened October 24, 1963, at the beginning, or eastern end, of the spur line. The PRR was eventually succeeded by Amtrak in 1971, which shares the NEC with NJT's Northeast Corridor Line and other commuter lines.

== Delco Lead ==
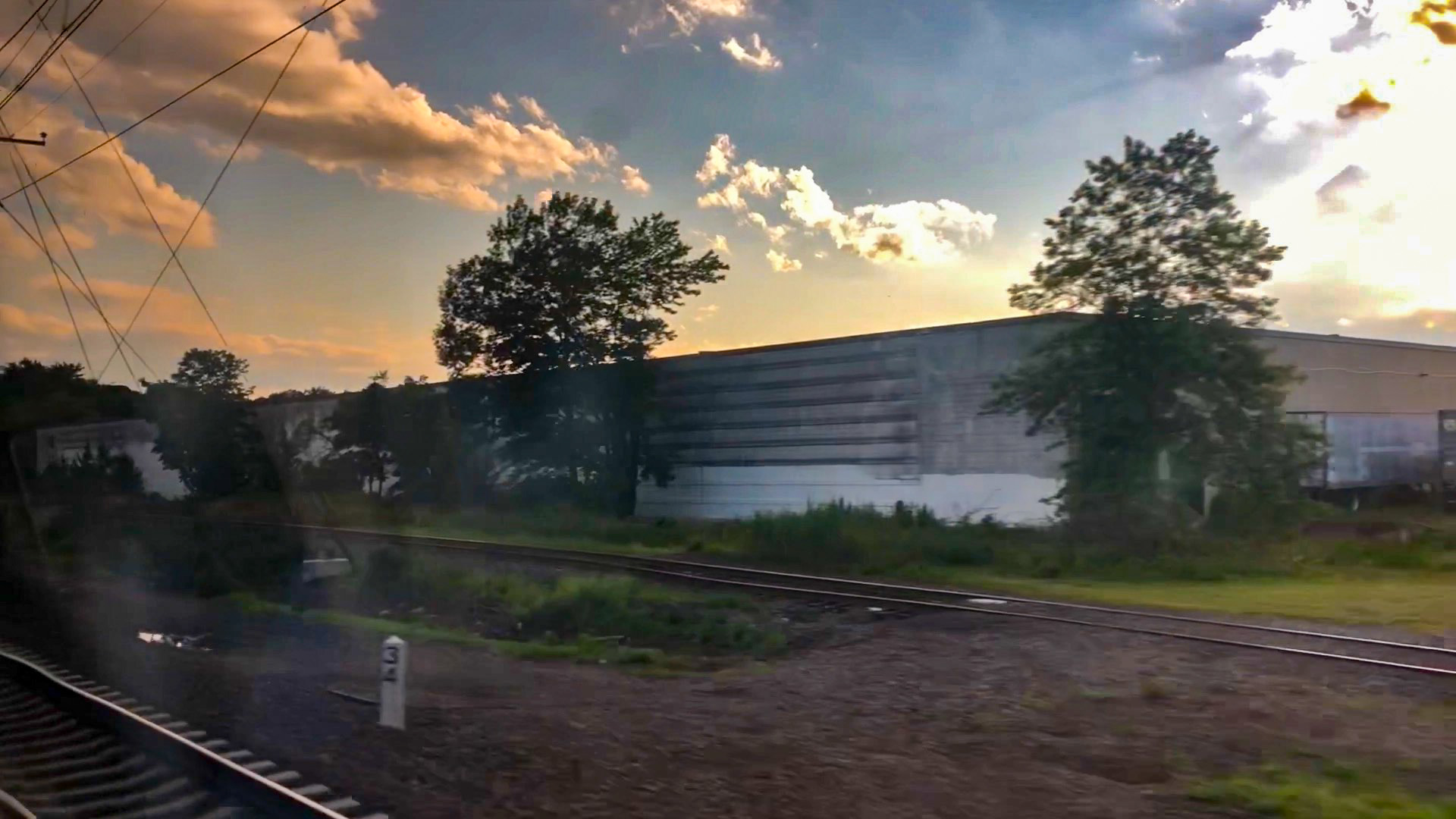
Part of the Delco Lead (far track) at the 34 mile marker.

During Hurricane Sandy in October 2012, nearly 400 NJT rail cars and locomotives were damaged when they were left in low-lying, flood-prone rail yards at Hoboken Yard and the Meadows Maintenance Complex in the Kearny Meadows. This prompted NJT to consider expanding storage to accommodate locomotives and cars at two Central Jersey locations. Five miles of electrified track at Delco Lead will be used to store rail vehicles during extreme weather events. In total, the Delco Lead and County Yard will provide storage capacity for 444 vehicles.

In January 2014, NJT awarded a $7.64 million design and engineering consultant service contract to Jacobs Engineering Group to conceive a "train haven" at County Yard where equipment could be stored during serious storms. The work, called the Delco Lead Safe Haven Storage and Re-lnspection Facility Project, involves reconfiguring and expanding the yard into the adjacent Mile Run Yard, which is not in service. Plans call for the new facility to include an inspection facility, since when equipment is taken out of service for weather reasons it is required by federal law to be re-inspected before being brought back into use. Further funding was provided in 2015, 2016, 2017. In 2019, $95 million was allocated to the expansion project.

Groundbreaking for the project took place in December 2024.

== Adams Yard and Mid-Line Loop ==
Amtrak and NJ Transit which are developing a high-speed corridor between New Brunswick and Trenton. with several projects planned for the "New Jersey Speedway" section of the NEC, which include a new station at North Brunswick and a flying junction and balloon loop called the Mid-Line Loop between MP 36 and MP 37 on the NEC south of the new station and Amtrak's Adams Yard, allowing trains to turn around and enter and leave service without crossing over tracks, and function as a staging area for a mid-line, middle zone, terminus.

=== Turboliner storage ===
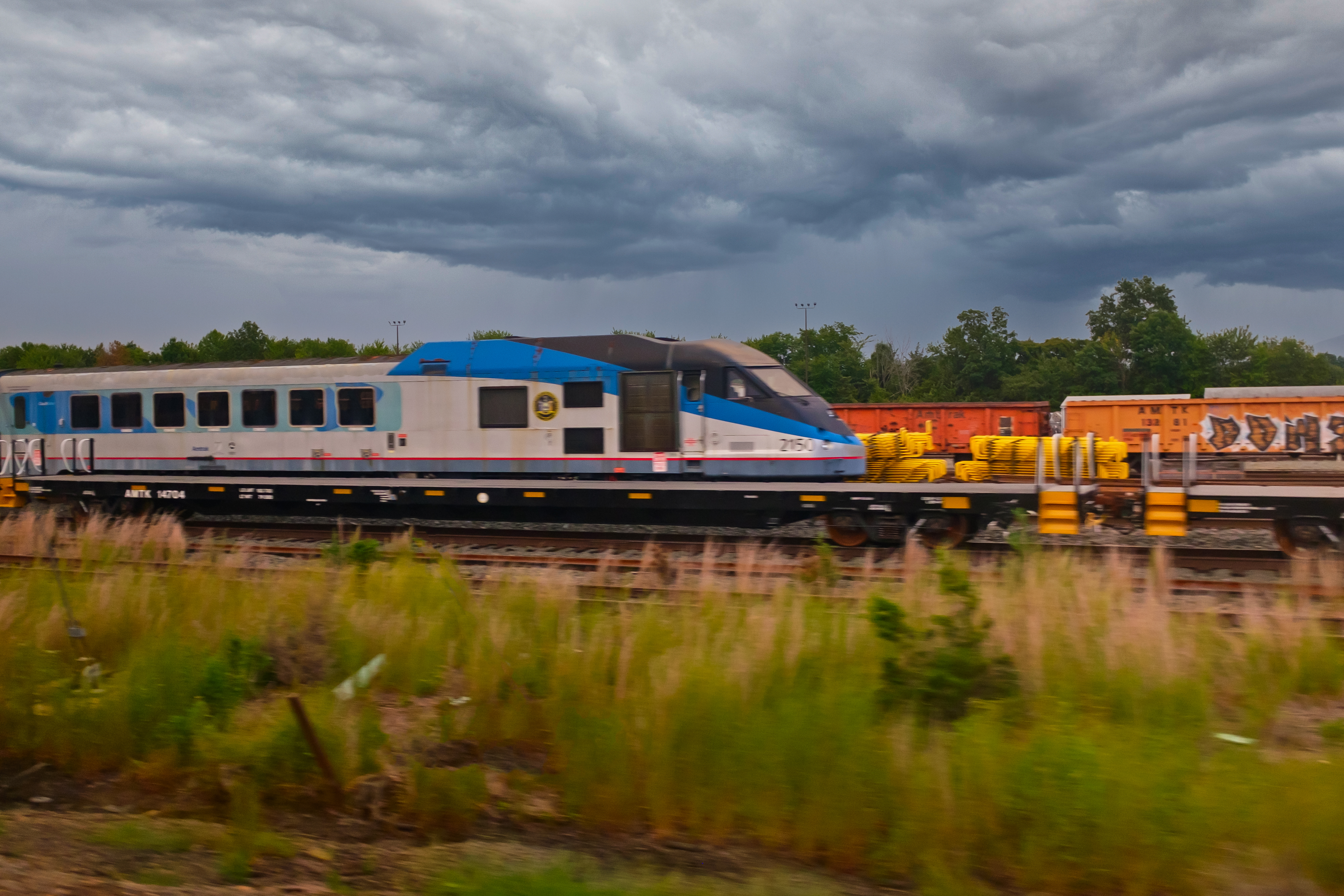
RTL Turboliner 2150 in Adams Yard on the NEC

In January 2018, Amtrak moved three derelict RTL-III Turboliner gas turbine trains formerly used on the Empire Corridor from storage in Bear, Delaware. Two sets went to Adams Yard and one went to New Haven, Connecticut's Cedar Hill Yard. They are currently used for employee training, however their fate is unclear. As of November 2024, the sets located at Adams Yard are still in storage with several old baggage cars and a coach from the Heritage Fleet between them.

== See also ==
- List of Northeast Corridor infrastructure
- List of New Jersey railroad junctions
