= New Brunswick station =

NJ Transit and Amtrak station

New Brunswick
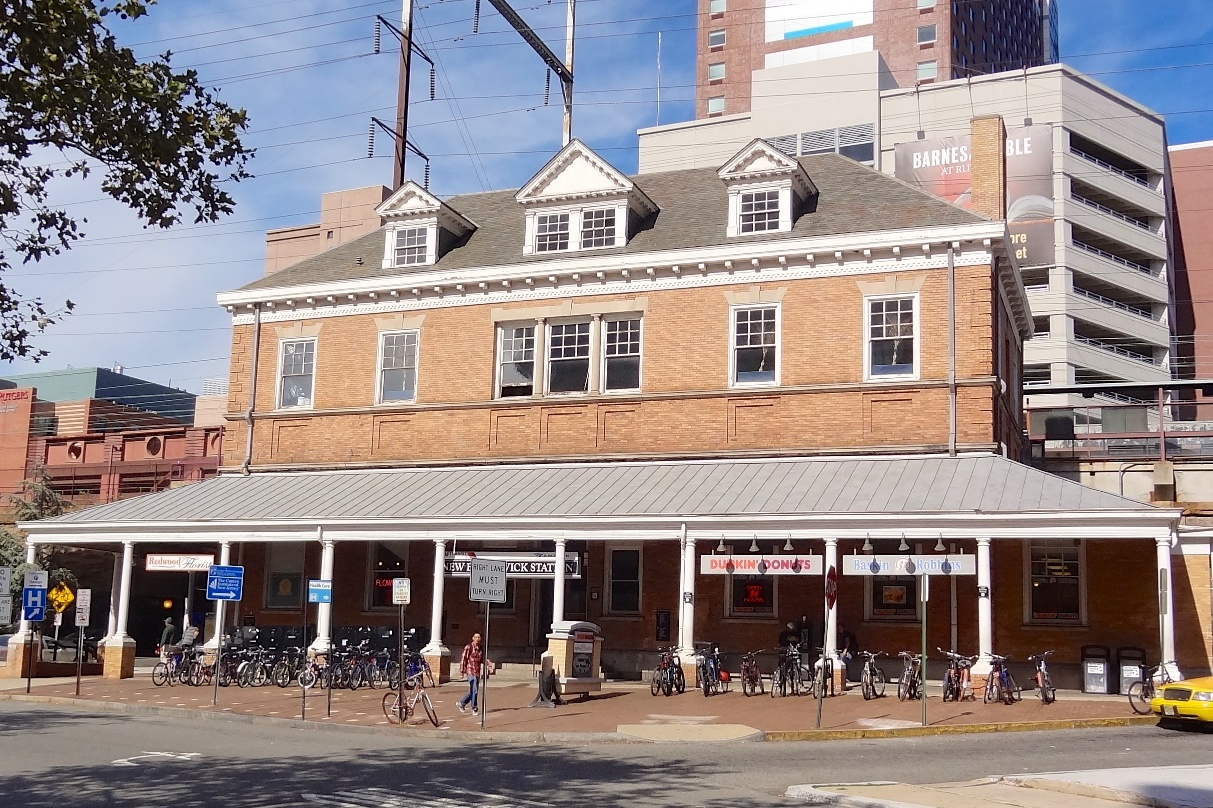
- The 1904 station building as seen from Albany Street in September 2013

General information
- Location: 1 Railroad Plaza; New Brunswick, New Jersey; United States
- Owner: New Jersey Transit
- Line: Amtrak Northeast Corridor
- Platforms: 2 side platforms
- Tracks: 4
- Connections: NJ Transit Bus: 810, 811, 814, 815, 818; Rutgers Campus Buses; Brunsquick Shuttles; Somerset County Transportation: DASH 851, DASH 852; Suburban Trails: Line 100; FlixBus

Construction
- Accessible: Yes

Other information
- Station code: Amtrak: NBK
- Fare zone: 14 (NJT)

History
- Opened: January 1, 1838
- Rebuilt: October 1903–September 28, 1904
- Electrified: December 8, 1932

Passengers
NJ Transit
- 2025: 3,590 (average weekday)
- Rank: 9 of 153
Amtrak
- FY 2025: 53,435 annually

Services
Preceding station	Amtrak	Following station
Princeton Junction toward Harrisburg	Keystone Service Limited service	Metropark toward New York
Princeton Junction toward Norfolk, Newport News or Roanoke	Northeast Regional	Metropark toward Boston South or Springfield
Acela does not stop here
Cardinal does not stop here
Carolinian does not stop here
Crescent does not stop here
Palmetto does not stop here
Pennsylvanian does not stop here
Silver Meteor does not stop here
Vermonter does not stop here
Preceding station	NJ Transit	Following station
Jersey Avenue weekdays toward Trenton	Northeast Corridor Line	Edison toward New York
Former services
Preceding station	Pennsylvania Railroad	Following station
Adams toward Chicago	Main Line	Edison toward New York or Exchange Place
Terminus	New Brunswick Line	Edison toward New York or Exchange Place
Jersey Avenue opened 1963 Terminus	New Brunswick Line	Edison toward New York or Exchange Place
Voorhees toward East Millstone	Millstone Branch	Terminus
- New Brunswick Station
- U.S. National Register of Historic Places
- New Jersey Register of Historic Places
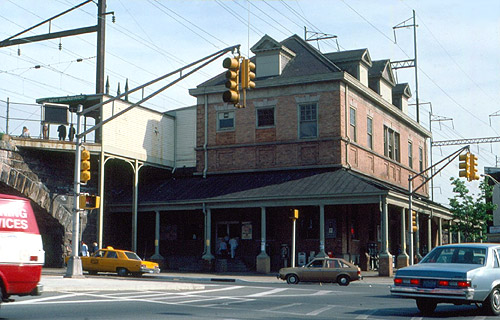
- New Brunswick station in May 1985
- Coordinates: 40°29′47″N 74°26′47″W
- Area: 0.5 acres (0.20 ha)
- Built: 1903
- Architects: William H. Brown, chief engineer of the Pennsylvania Railroad
- Architectural style: Colonial Revival, Georgian Revival
- MPS: Operating Passenger Railroad Stations TR
- NRHP reference No.: 84002732
- NJRHP No.: 1875

Significant dates
- Added to NRHP: June 22, 1984
- Designated NJRHP: March 17, 1984
Location

New Brunswick is an active commuter railroad train station in the city of New Brunswick, Middlesex County, New Jersey, United States. The station services trains of New Jersey Transit's Northeast Corridor Line and Amtrak's Keystone Service and Northeast Regional. For New Jersey Transit trains, the next station to the southwest (towards Trenton Transit Center) is Jersey Avenue, while the next station to the northeast (towards New York Penn Station) is Edison. For Amtrak services, the next station southwest is Princeton Junction, the next station to the northeast is Metropark. The station consists of two handicap-accessible side platforms surrounding the four tracks.

Railroad service in New Brunswick began on January 1, 1838, with the extension of the New Jersey Railroad from East Brunswick (modern-day Highland Park) over the Raritan River. Construction of the current station depot at the junction of Albany and French Streets (State Route 27) and Easton Avenue (County Route 527) began in October 1903, opening on September 28, 1904, for the Pennsylvania Railroad.

== Service ==
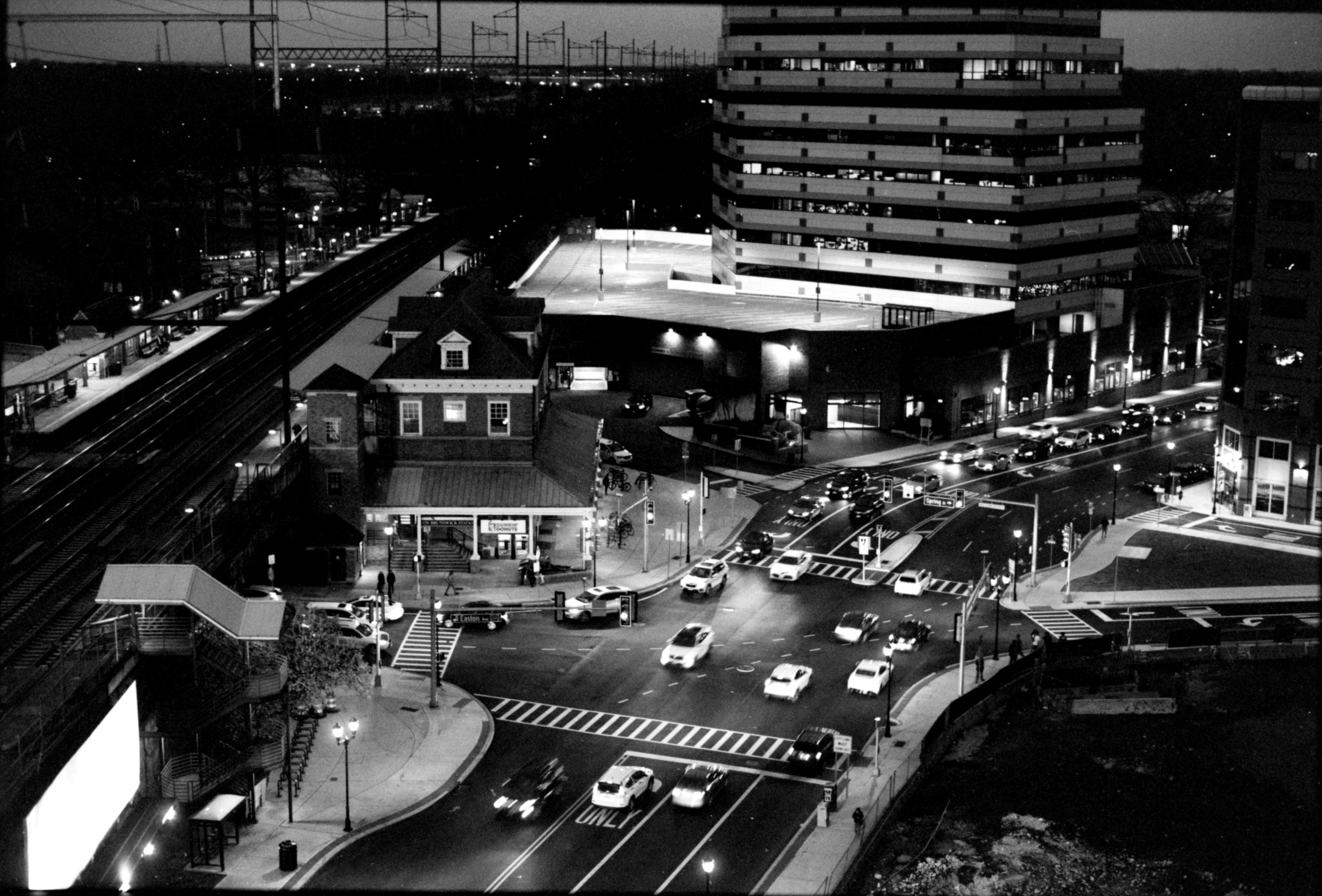
New Brunswick station looking north from nearby parking garage. Northeast Corridor and train platforms visible, left.

The station has two high-level side platforms serving the outer tracks of the four-track Northeast Corridor.

NJ Transit's Northeast Corridor Line calls at the station. Most of Amtrak's Northeast Corridor services bypass the station via the inner tracks, except for select Keystone Service and Northeast Regional trains. The Northbound Crescent stopped here from November 24, 2022, to July 4, 2023.

== History ==
Train service to New Brunswick was begun by the New Jersey Railroad, northbound in 1838 and southbound in 1839. Its successor, Pennsylvania Railroad, built the current station in 1903 when the tracks were raised above street level. Service was eventually taken over by Penn Central and then Amtrak and New Jersey Transit. In 2005, the Clocker trains, a popular commuter service serving the station, were transferred to NJT. In October 2015 the southbound Palmetto began stopping here.

The depot was designed in the Colonial Revival style and includes walls of light brown brick, hipped roof with gabled dormers and a deep cornice with dentil molding at its base. Brick quoins at the corners of the building convey an impression of strength and solidity. Windows display a popular Georgian Revival pattern of 9-over-1. Sills are incorporated into a stone belt course that wraps around the building, while lintels are embellished with prominent keystones. The design is similar to that of the Chester Transit Center in Pennsylvania.

The station building was listed on the New Jersey Register of Historic Places and National Register of Historic Places since 1984, and is part of the Operating Passenger Railroad Stations Thematic Resource.

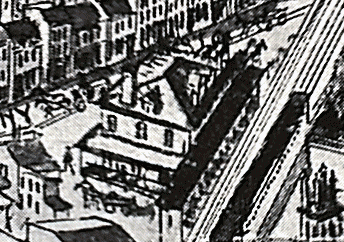
New Brunswick station in 1910

=== Urban transit hub ===
In 2005 the station was designated the core of the New Brunswick transit village, a smart growth initiative to promote transit-oriented development which can include government incentives to encourage compact, higher density, mixed-use development within walking distance of the station.

In addition to New Jersey Transit bus operations and Rutgers Campus buses, the station is served by local shuttles known as Brunsquick and DASH. Studies are underway to develop the New Brunswick Bus Rapid Transit system, of which the station would be the hub. NJ 18 and NJ 27, which intersect at the station, would function as the two major corridors for a bus network that would connect downtown, residential neighborhoods, the five campuses of Rutgers in the city and Piscataway, and nearby communities.

New Brunswick is one of nine cities in New Jersey designated as eligible for Urban Transit Hub Tax Credits by the state's Economic Development Authority. Developers who invest a minimum of $50 million within 0.5 miles (0.80 km) of a train station are eligible for pro-rated tax credit. The Gateway is one such project located just to the north of station and connected by a new pedestrian bridge, creating a direct link to the Rutgers campus. It is the tallest building in the city and one of several new projects in the vicinity of the station that has led to a revitalization of the city's downtown surrounding it. Another planned building, a 16-story residential tower at Somerset Street located one block north of the station, is the second UTHTC-approved project in the city.

=== High-speed rail corridor ===
In August 2011, the United States Department of Transportation obligated $450 million to a six-year project to improve 24 miles (39 km) of the Northeast Corridor between New Brunswick and Trenton. The Next Generation High-Speed project is to upgrade electrical power, signals, and overhead catenary wires to improve reliability and increase speed to 160 mph (260 km/h), and with new trains to 186 mph (299 km/h).

=== Renovation and upgrades ===
In 2019 Amtrak earmarked funds for improvement at the station. NJ Transit allocated $49 million in September 2022, for renovation and upgrades of the station. On October 13, 2023, Amtrak announced that the New Brunswick station, along with Princeton Junction, would receive upgraded service due to increased demand.

== See also ==
- Millstone and New Brunswick Railroad
- List of NJ Transit railroad stations

== Bibliography ==
- Wall, John Patrick (1921). History of Middlesex County, New Jersey, 1664-1920, Volume 1. Lewis Historical Publishing Company.
