= Northeast Corridor Line =

Commuter rail line in New Jersey and New York

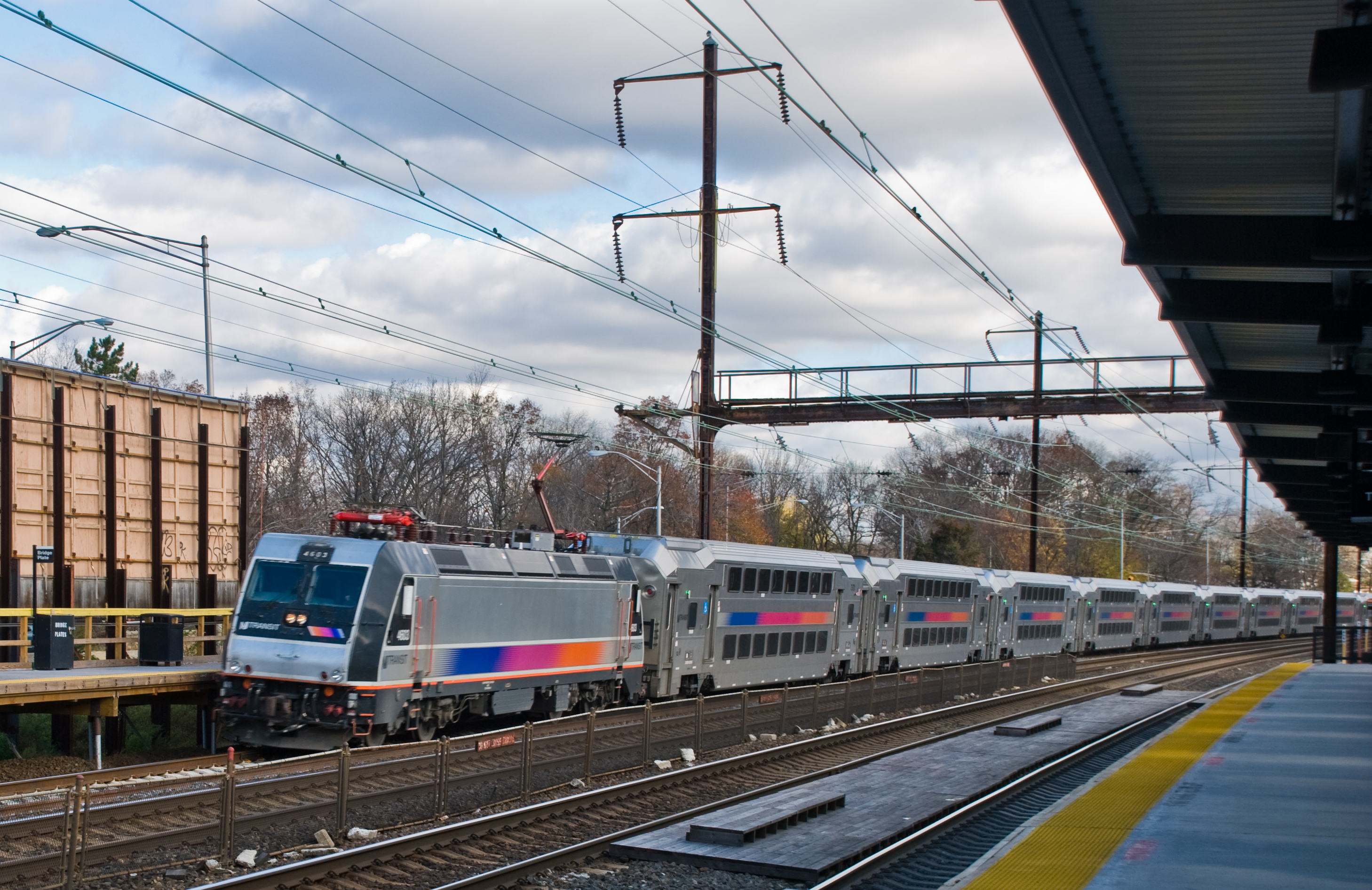
- A Northeast Corridor Line train at Metropark in Woodbridge Township, New Jersey

Overview
- Owner: Amtrak (tracks)
- Locale: Northern and Central New Jersey
- Termini: New York Penn Station; Trenton Transit Center
- Stations: 17

Service
- Type: Commuter rail
- System: NJ Transit Rail Operations
- Operator: NJ Transit
- Rolling stock: ALP-46 or ALP-45DP locomotives Comet II IV & V or MultiLevel coaches Arrow III railcars
- Daily ridership: 81,550 (Q1, FY 2025)

Technical
- Line length: 58.1 mi (93.5 km)
- Track gauge: 4 ft 8 1/2 in (1,435 mm) standard gauge
- Electrification: Overhead line, 12 kV 25 Hz

The Northeast Corridor Line is a commuter rail service operated by NJ Transit between the Trenton Transit Center and New York Penn Station on Amtrak's Northeast Corridor in the United States. The service is the successor to Pennsylvania Railroad commuter trains between Trenton and New York, and is NJ Transit's busiest commuter rail service. After arrival at New York Penn Station, some trains load passengers and return to New Jersey, while others continue east to Sunnyside Yard for storage. Most servicing is done at the Morrisville Yard, at the west end of the line.

As of April 27, 2025, the Northeast Corridor Line operates 131 trains (68 inbound, 63 outbound) on weekdays. Of these, 49 inbound trains originate from Trenton, 12 from Jersey Avenue, 4 from New Brunswick, 1 from Metropark, 1 from Newark Airport, and 1 from Newark Penn Station. 13 outbound trains terminate at Jersey Avenue, and 50 at Trenton. Stations north of Metropark are also served by North Jersey Coast Line trains throughout the day.

The Northeast Corridor Line is colored red on NJ Transit system maps, and its symbol is the New Jersey State House. The Princeton Branch is a shuttle service connecting to the line. Connecting SEPTA Trenton Line service between Philadelphia and Trenton is listed in the timetable.

== History ==
=== 19th century ===
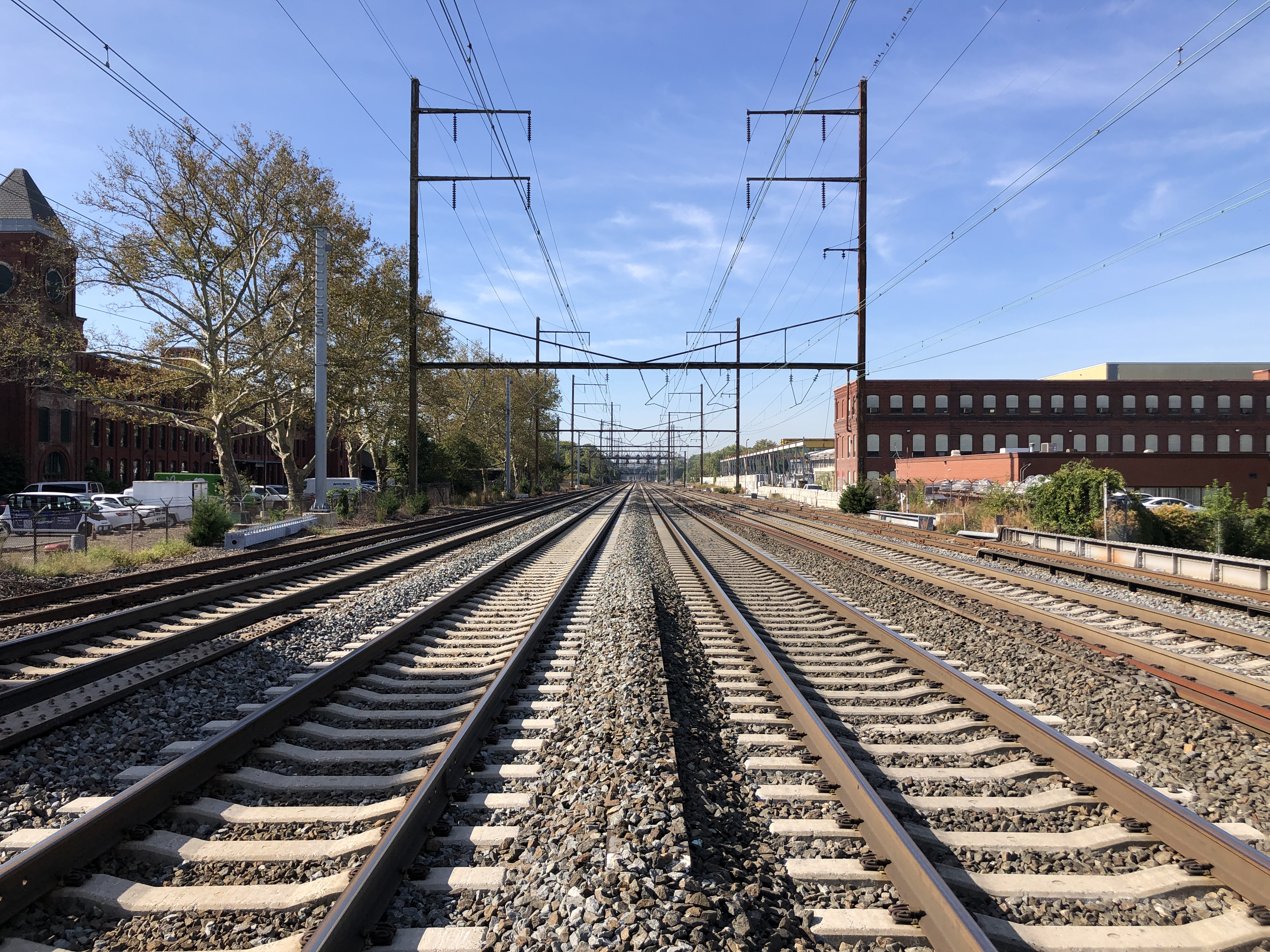
The Northeast Corridor tracks between Hamilton Township and Trenton in central New Jersey

Service on what is now the Northeast Corridor dates to the 1830s, with trains originating and terminating at the PRR's terminal at Exchange Place in Jersey City, New Jersey, which was the terminus of the PRR's network for most of the 19th century.

In December 1855, work to extend the line's second track from Elizabethtown to Rahway was completed, eliminating the need for trains to meet in single-track territory. The New Jersey Railroad Board approved a contract for the rails for the second track between New Brunswick and Rahway to Cooper & Hewitt on February 5, 1859. The completion of the second track was authorized by the Board on April 23, 1859.

In May 1859, the New Jersey Railroad began work on the project. The second track was completed in November, completing the second track from New Brunswick to Jersey City.

In June 1873, the PRR began grading the right-of-way to widen the line from two to four tracks between Rahway and Elizabeth. In September 1873, the two additional tracks were completed between Scott Street in Rahway and Linden, and grading for the third track between Elizabeth and Waverly was underway.

In March 1882, the PRR completed the four-tracking of the line between Houtenville and South Elizabeth with the completion of a four-track bridge over the Rahway River in Rahway. On April 1, 1882, Uniontown station was renamed Iselin. On November 5, 1882, the new PX interlocking tower was placed into service at Perth Amboy Junction in Rahway.

In 1885, with the exception of through the cities of Trenton, New Brunswick, Elizabeth, and Newark, the line was completely four-tracked between Trenton and Jersey City.

=== 20th century ===
Penn Station opened in 1910, but was originally designed for long-distance passenger trains. As a result, steam-hauled commuter traffic continued to use the older Jersey City station.

On May 10, 1914, the new DX tower at Rahway was placed into service. Newly elevated tracks 3 and 4 were completed that year between Colonia and North Rahway. In addition, a new station was built at Linden.

The new northbound tracks at Linden opened on July 9, 1914. In 1915, the six tracking of the line between South Elizabeth and Colonia was completed, including grade separation work in Rahway and Linden. On July 11, 1915, the westbound platforms at Rahway and the flying junction with the Perth Amboy Branch were completed. The new Rahway station was completed on December 1, 1915.

On September 25, 1929, the PRR Board authorized the extension of the line's fifth and sixth tracks between "LANE" and "ELMORA" interlockings. The Board authorized the widening of the line's right-of-way between Elizabeth and Trenton on October 9, 1929.

On November 1, 1929, the PRR announced it would build a new $1.75 million station at Trenton. This plan was abandoned the following spring as a result of the Great Depression.

On April 15, 1930, the section of eastbound track 1 between Colonia station and St. George Street in Rahway was relocated to ground level. The jump over track completed in 1914 and 1915 was abandoned. On July 3, 1930, the PRR notified officials in Elizabeth that it would abandon plans to widen the line to six tracks between "LANE" and "ELMORA" as acquiring the condemnation award for the 30-foot wide strips was $290,828, when the railroad had estimated the cost would be $56,000. On September 10, 1930, the tracks on the line between "UNION" in Rahway and Colonia were realigned to eliminate a curve.

After overhead catenary lines were built between Trenton and Penn Station, it was possible to run trains of electric multiple units direct to Manhattan. Accordingly, the PRR began running commuter trains from Trenton to Penn Station in 1933.

The three westernmost tracks at the new Pennsylvania Station in Newark opened for operation on March 24, 1935. An old swing bridge was replaced by a new three-track lift Dock Bridge. In addition, "DOCK" tower, located at the east end of the station, was put into service.

The PRR Board authorized the construction of a new waiting room and concrete platform at Rahway on June 26, 1940.

The weekday schedule in September 1951 had six trains a day from New York City to Trenton, seven from New York City to New Brunswick, two from Jersey City to Trenton and six from Jersey City to New Brunswick. That includes just the trains that terminated at Trenton or New Brunswick; many more trains from New York City to Philadelphia and beyond carried passengers to some suburban stations.

By the 1960s, the financial situation of the Pennsylvania Railroad began deteriorating. With the railroad unable to sustain the money losing commuter operation, let alone invest in improved physical plant and rolling stock, the New Jersey Department of Transportation became involved with maintaining the service.

In 1968, NJDOT funded construction of the new Metropark station. The following year, in 1969, they funded 35 new stainless steel "Jersey Arrow" MU cars.

After 1968, the service was taken over by the merged Penn Central railroad and following the Penn Central's bankruptcy the commuter service was taken over by Conrail in 1976. Conrail continued to operate the line under contract to NJDOT. The state continued to fund replacement of the aging pre-war MU equipment with the Arrow II and Arrow III orders. Finally in 1983, NJ Transit, which already operated nearly all bus service in New Jersey, took over all of Conrail's commuter lines, including the Northeast Corridor Line.

=== Clockers ===
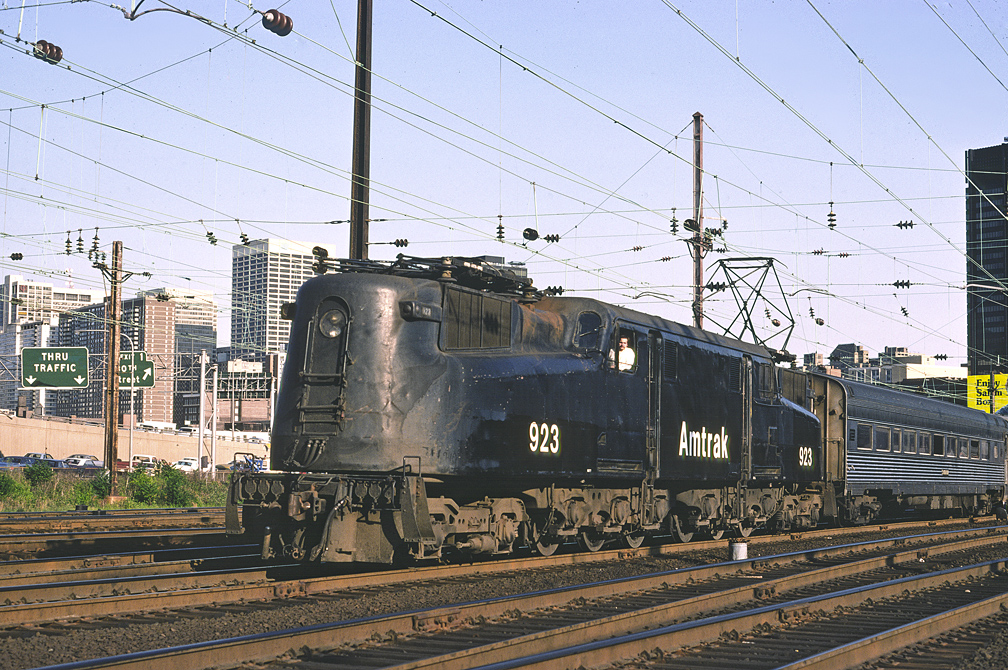
An Amtrak Clocker departing 30th Street Station in Philadelphia in 1976

Clocker trains were started by the Pennsylvania Railroad between Philadelphia and New York City; until the 1950s, weekday trains departed New York City and Philadelphia on the hour through the day, giving rise to the Clocker name. After the Amtrak takeover of the Northeast Corridor the no-longer-hourly "Clocker" service was targeted at commuters making local stops bypassed by the high speed Metroliner and individually named trains.

During the 1990s, NJ Transit contracted with Amtrak to accept monthly NJ Transit passholders on the Clocker trains. Soon the Clockers were primarily used by NJ Transit commuters with only a handful of riders taking the trains to or from Philadelphia; the Clockers were much faster (and more comfortable) than a typical NJ Transit train, but slower and more crowded than a typical Amtrak train causing the former's riders to prefer the trains and the latter's riders to avoid them.

With most Clocker riders using NJ Transit tickets, NJ Transit supplied new ALP-46 locomotives to haul the trains' Amfleet coaches; Amtrak soon discontinued the Clocker service altogether and sold the capacity slots to NJ Transit for new Trenton express trains. The Clocker last ran on October 28, 2005, and thereafter NJ Transit began several extra Trenton-New York express trips.

== Service ==
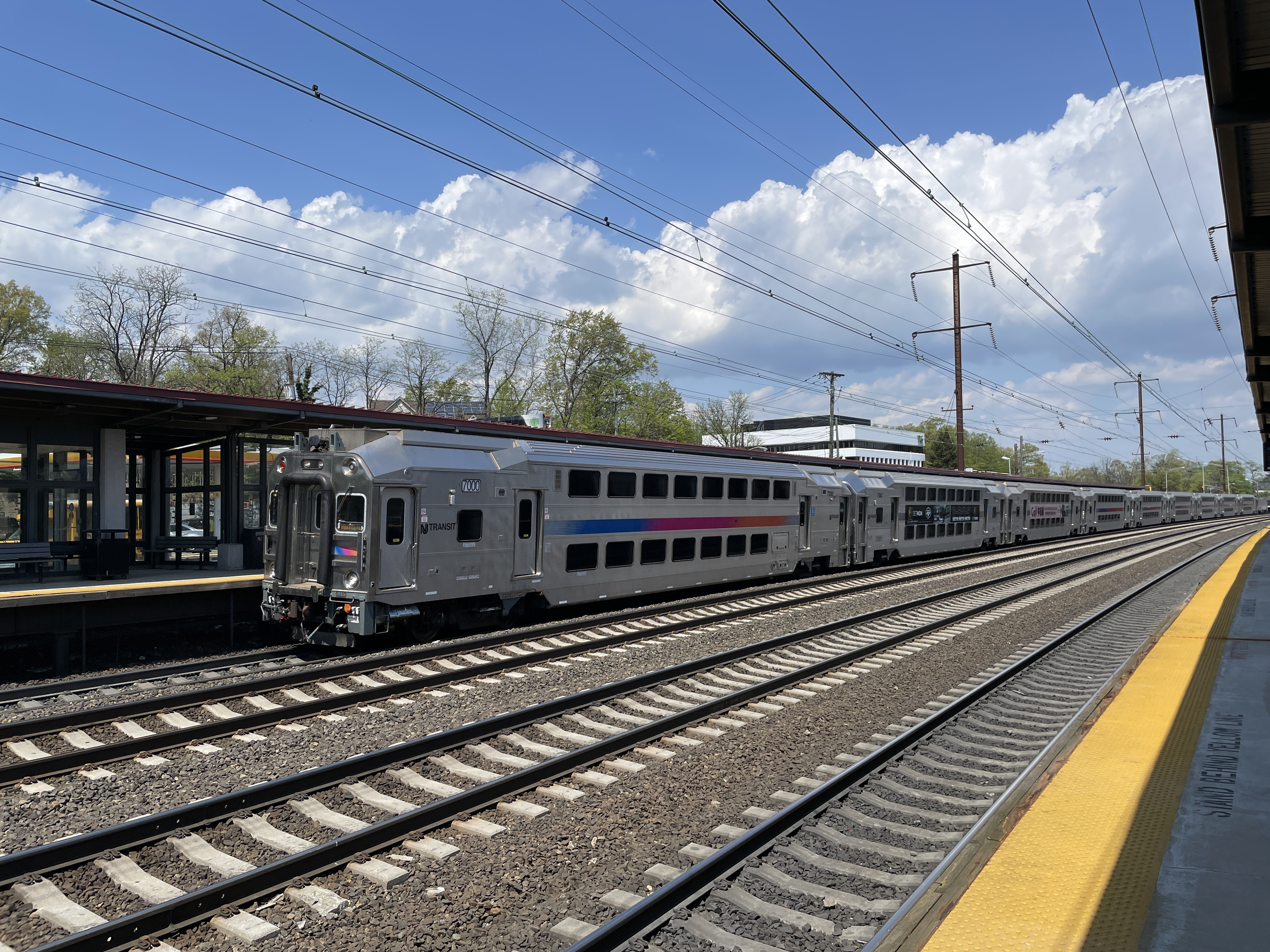
An outbound Northeast Corridor Line train stops at Metropark station

During the peak period, stations between North Elizabeth and Rahway are mostly covered by North Jersey Coast Line trains. Stations between Rahway and New Brunswick are served by Jersey Avenue Locals, which originate and terminate at Jersey Avenue station in New Brunswick, while Trenton Express trains make their first or last stop at Princeton Junction or New Brunswick. A few all-stops locals operate sporadically on weekdays as well and all day on weekends. Jersey Avenue Locals make local stops between Rahway and Elizabeth outside peak periods. North Elizabeth station is skipped by most NEC Line trains, and inbound trains from Trenton cannot stop at Jersey Avenue.

The line's route is part of the middle leg of Amtrak's Northeast Corridor. All eleven of Amtrak's Northeast Corridor services run along this line. New York Penn, Newark Penn, and Trenton have long been among Amtrak's busiest stations; connections to Amtrak are also available at Newark International Liberty Airport, Metropark, New Brunswick, and Princeton Junction. With fast and frequent Amtrak and NJ Transit service, the Trenton to New York City portion of the Northeast Corridor is one of the busiest rail lines in North America.

== Ridership ==
With high levels of service and a route through one of the most densely populated areas of the United States, the Northeast Corridor Line is New Jersey Transit's busiest rail line. On an average weekday in 2012, the Northeast Corridor Line handled 117,400 boardings. The line also contains all of New Jersey Transit's busiest non-terminal stations: Metropark with 7,447 boardings; Princeton Junction with 6,816; Trenton with 4,638; and New Brunswick with 4,976 weekday boardings.

== Rolling stock ==
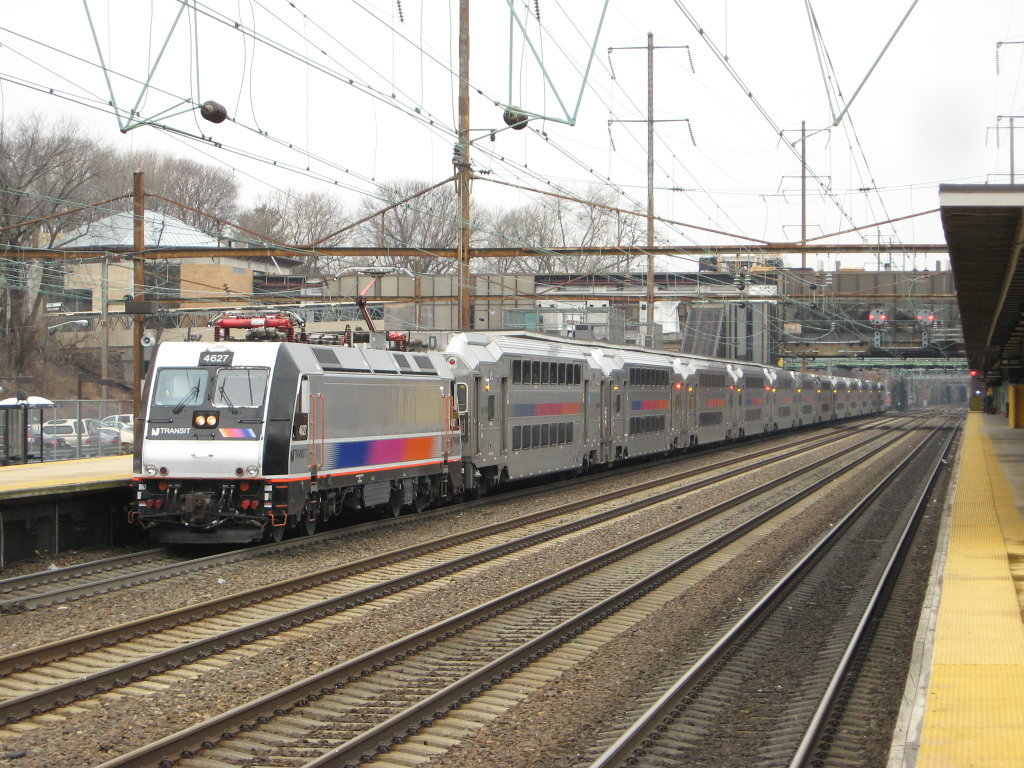
Two NJ Transit Bombardier ALP-46s with a consist of Bombardier MultiLevel Coaches at Trenton Transit Center

All service on the Northeast Corridor Line is electric via overhead lines and uses either Budd/GE Arrow III multiple unit cars during rush hours and normally one to two sets on the weekends, and push-pull locomotive trains hauled by ALP-46, an electric or ALP-45DP dual-mode locomotive, at all times. These trains are made up of Comet II & IV with a Comet V cab series cars or Bombardier Transportation MultiLevels.

== Line improvements ==
The modern era of commuter operations began in 1983 when New Jersey Transit Rail Operations took over the service from Conrail. Since that time, numerous changes to the line intended to improve New Jersey Transit service have been made. These include the following.

=== Morrisville Yard ===
The Morrisville Yard is used for train layups. In 2007 NJT opened a new 19-track yard on the site of the former Pennsylvania Railroad freight classification yard across the Delaware River in Morrisville, Pennsylvania. The new yard replaced the haphazard collection of storage tracks around the Trenton Station complex. This not only increased the absolute number of trains that could be stored at the end of the line, but also reduced the number of relay movements needed to position trains in at the correct platform at Trenton. Capacity was also increased by trains no longer having to cross all four mainline tracks to access their storage tracks as the new Morrisville yard is accessed by a flying junction.

=== Trenton Transit Center ===
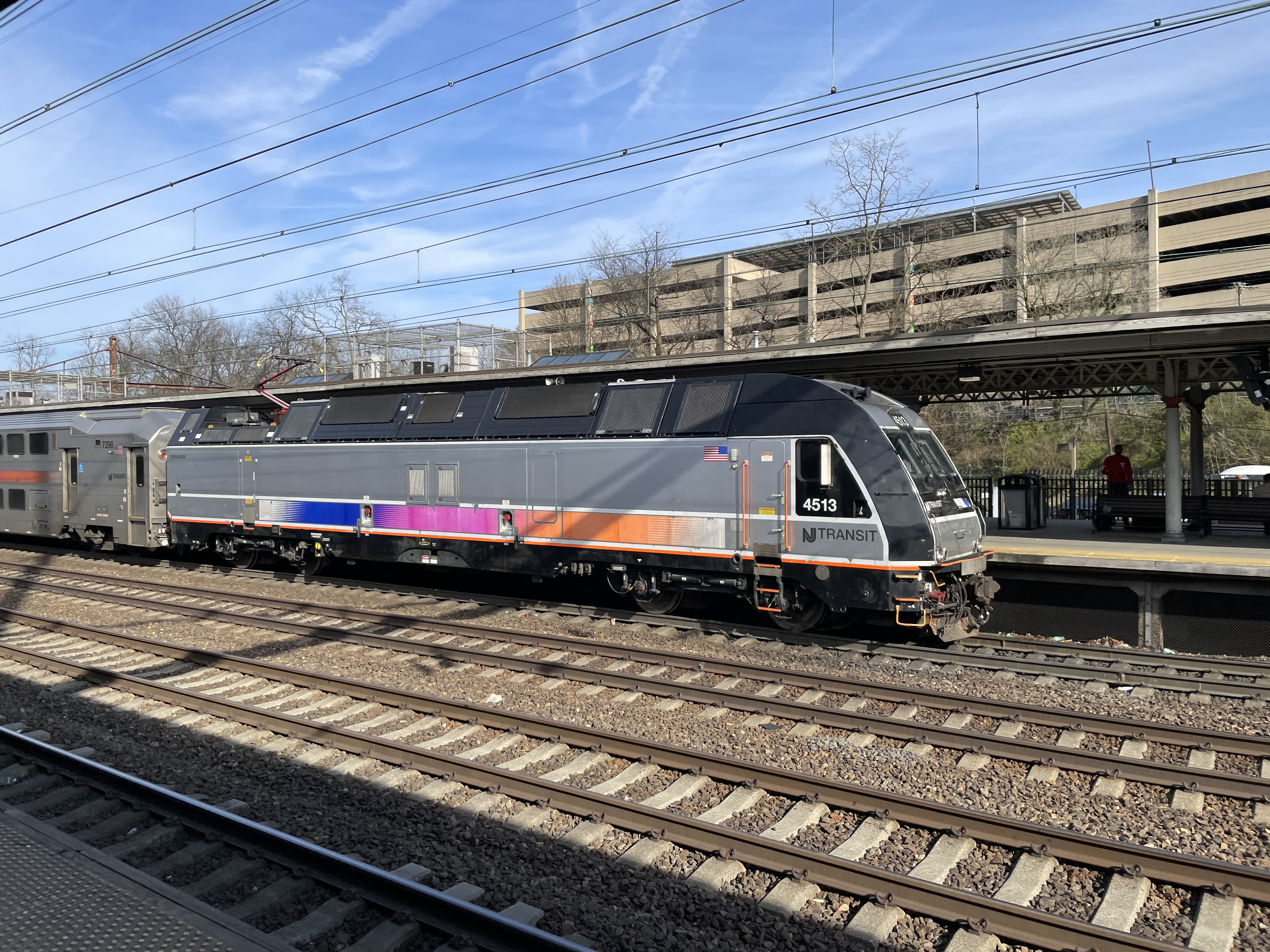
NJ Transit Northeast Corridor Line train at Trenton Transit Center

The Trenton Transit Center is the beginning of the New Jersey Transit portion of the Northeast Corridor line and the terminus of SEPTA's Trenton Line service. The Trenton station is also a major stop for Amtrak trains, serving 2 Acelas, most Northeast Regional trains, most Keystone Service trains, and nearly all medium- and long-distance trains running along the Northeast Corridor.

In 2004 the River Line light rail Trenton station opened across the street, creating a rail link between the Northeast Corridor Line and Camden and the riverfront communities of Burlington County that did not require crossing the Delaware River into Pennsylvania. In 2008 the station was formally renamed the Trenton Transit Center as the station was overhauled, including the complete replacement of the station headhouse and concourse structure which had last been rebuilt during the 1960s. The new station has more space for vendors and passengers.

=== Hamilton station ===
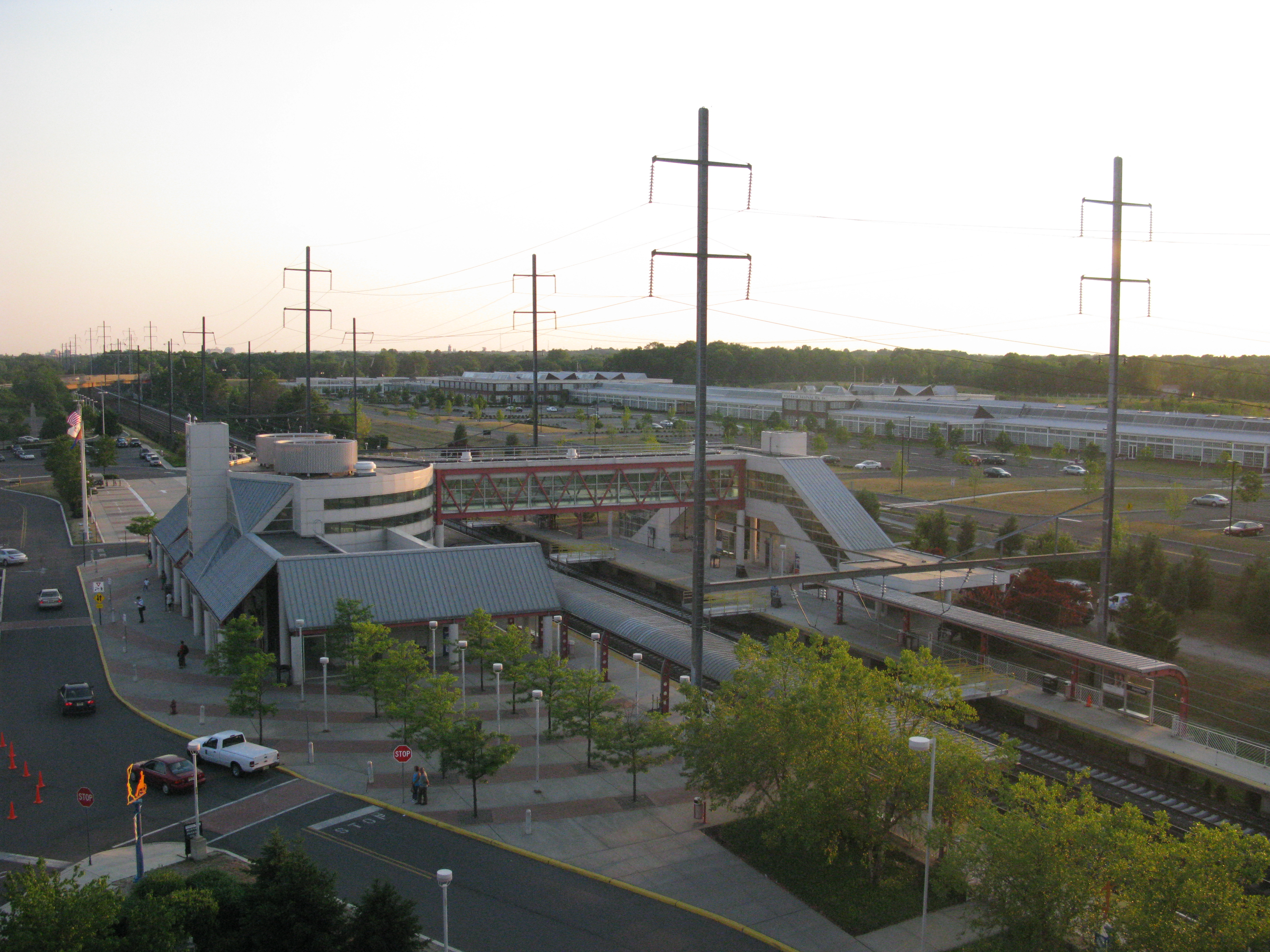
Hamilton station's building

Hamilton Station in Hamilton Township opened in 1999, costing $30 million (1992 USD). With almost direct access to Interstate 295, park and ride capacity was large with 1,556 spaces available at the station's opening. Due to the popularity of the station with commuters arriving via Interstate from points south in New Jersey and Pennsylvania, a parking deck was added in 2007 with 2,066 more spaces for a total of 3,622. The station has sculptures and designs from the Grounds for Sculpture, a sculpture park in Hamilton.

Hamilton Station did much to alleviate the increasingly desperate parking situations in Trenton and Princeton Junction. Trenton's downtown station is hard to reach and has little space for parking; Princeton Junction has no direct access to a major highway and its vast parking lot had long since reached capacity. The Hamilton Station was built for New York area commuters traveling increasing distances to work. Its direct freeway access and ample parking proved a hit with riders and it is one of the busiest stations on the New Jersey Transit system. The conversion of the nearby American Standard factory into transit oriented development led to further ridership gains. A new NJ Transit bus garage was also built within the station complex replacing an older garage formerly used by NJ Transit, and Mercer Metro within the City of Trenton.

=== Metropark station ===
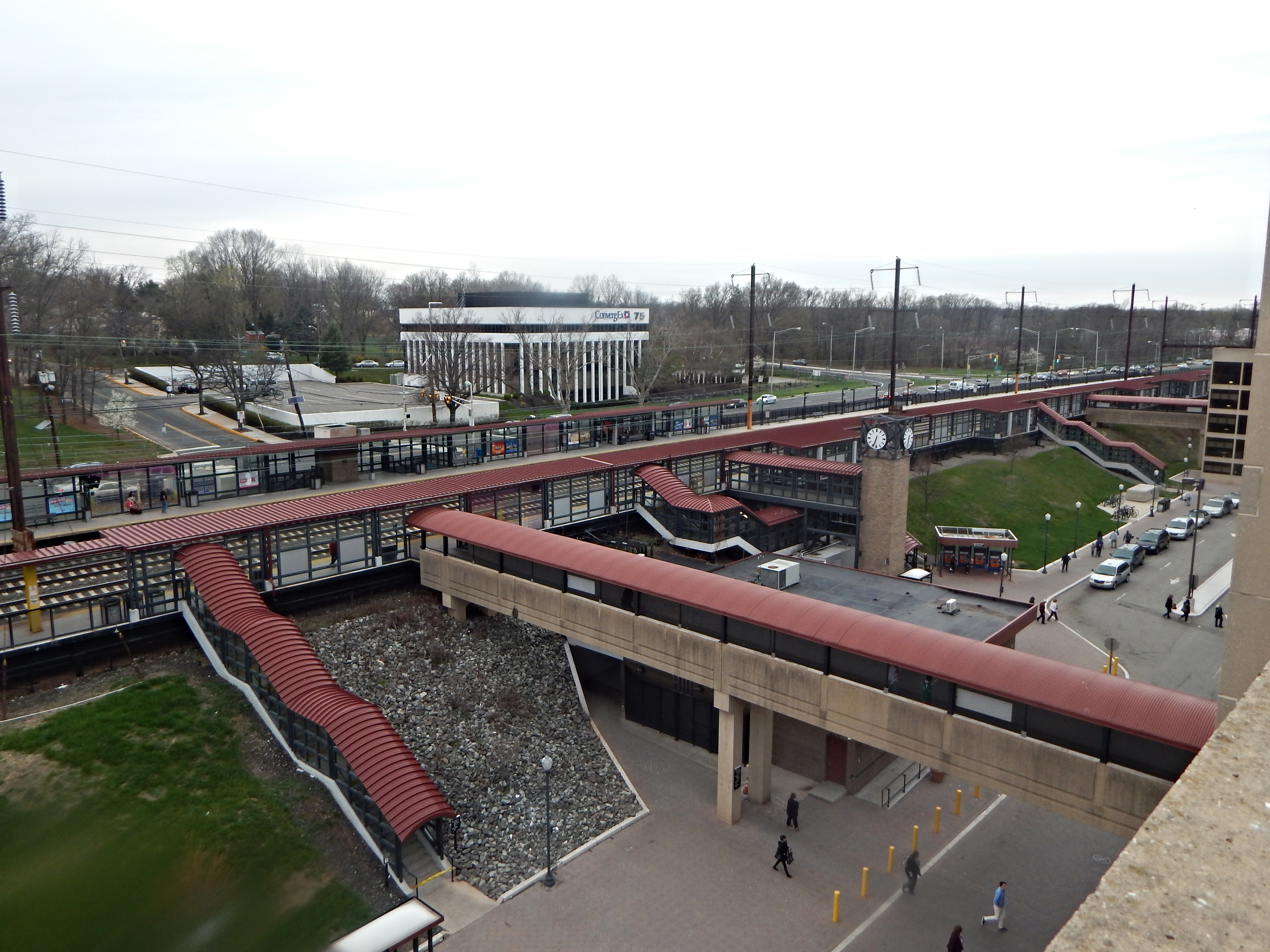
Metropark station in April 2015

The Metropark rail station project was initiated by NJDOT in 1968 as part of a plan to accommodate businesses and commuters that were fleeing the old urban cores. The station opened in 1971 next to the Garden State Parkway for easy access by automobile; nearby stations at Iselin and Colonia closed soon after. The new station was also designed with the new Metroliner Service in mind with high level platforms and a large business park to make the new station a destination in itself. To allow Metroliners and other express trains to stop at Metropark new crossovers were installed in the 1980s on either side of the station to allow trains on the inner express tracks to pull over and stop at the two side platforms.

=== Newark Airport station ===
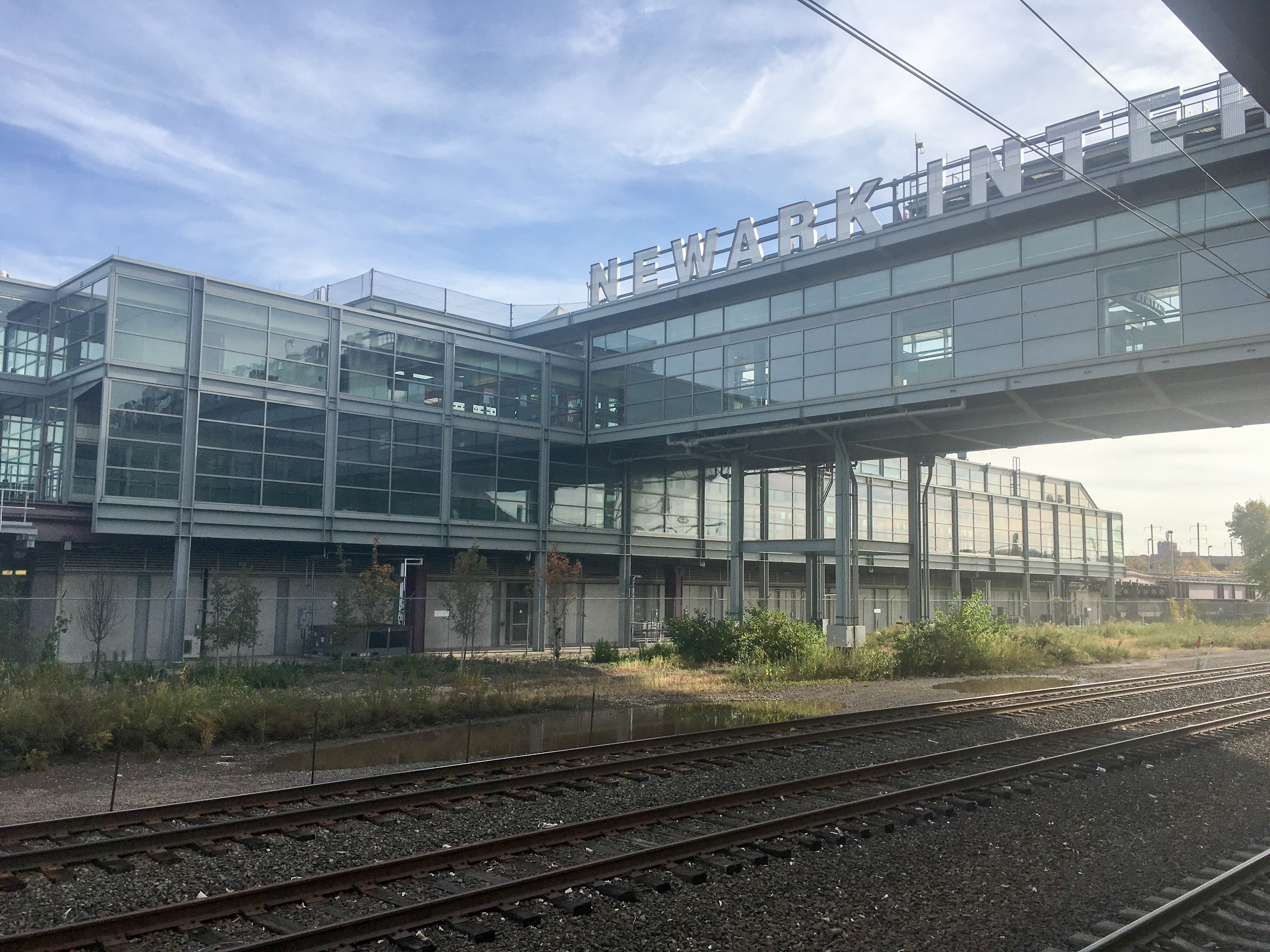
Newark Liberty International Airport Station in 2017

Newark Liberty International Airport Station was built in conjunction with the Port Authority of New York and New Jersey, the owner of Newark Liberty International Airport. This station allows passengers to connect with AirTrain Newark, the airport's monorail. The station opened in late 2001 and was part of a larger project to increase capacity south of Newark Penn Station. Along with the station's two island platforms, two tracks were added for a mile east and west of the station, bringing the number of tracks on this section of the corridor to 6. This allows some NJT express and Amtrak trains to pass local trains. The station was deliberately built as a train/monorail transfer station, as there is no direct pedestrian access, bus service, parking facility, or drop-off area. While the Port Authority has studied plans to extend PATH to Newark Airport station, these plans were put on hold in 2023.

=== Kearny and Waterfront Connections ===
The Waterfront Connection opened in 1991, allowing eastward trains from the ex-PRR Northeast Corridor to connect to ex-DL&W Morris and Essex Lines to Hoboken Terminal. No NEC trains serve Hoboken Terminal as of January 2010 (in the 1990s there was one Hoboken-Trenton train a day) but a few North Jersey Coast Line trains run across the connection during weekday peak hours, allowing NEC passengers to transfer. At other times, passengers must transfer using PATH.

The Kearny Connection opened in 1996, allowing the opposite connection, eastward from ex-DL&W to ex-PRR, and many Morristown Line trains now use it to reach New York Penn Station.

=== Secaucus Junction ===
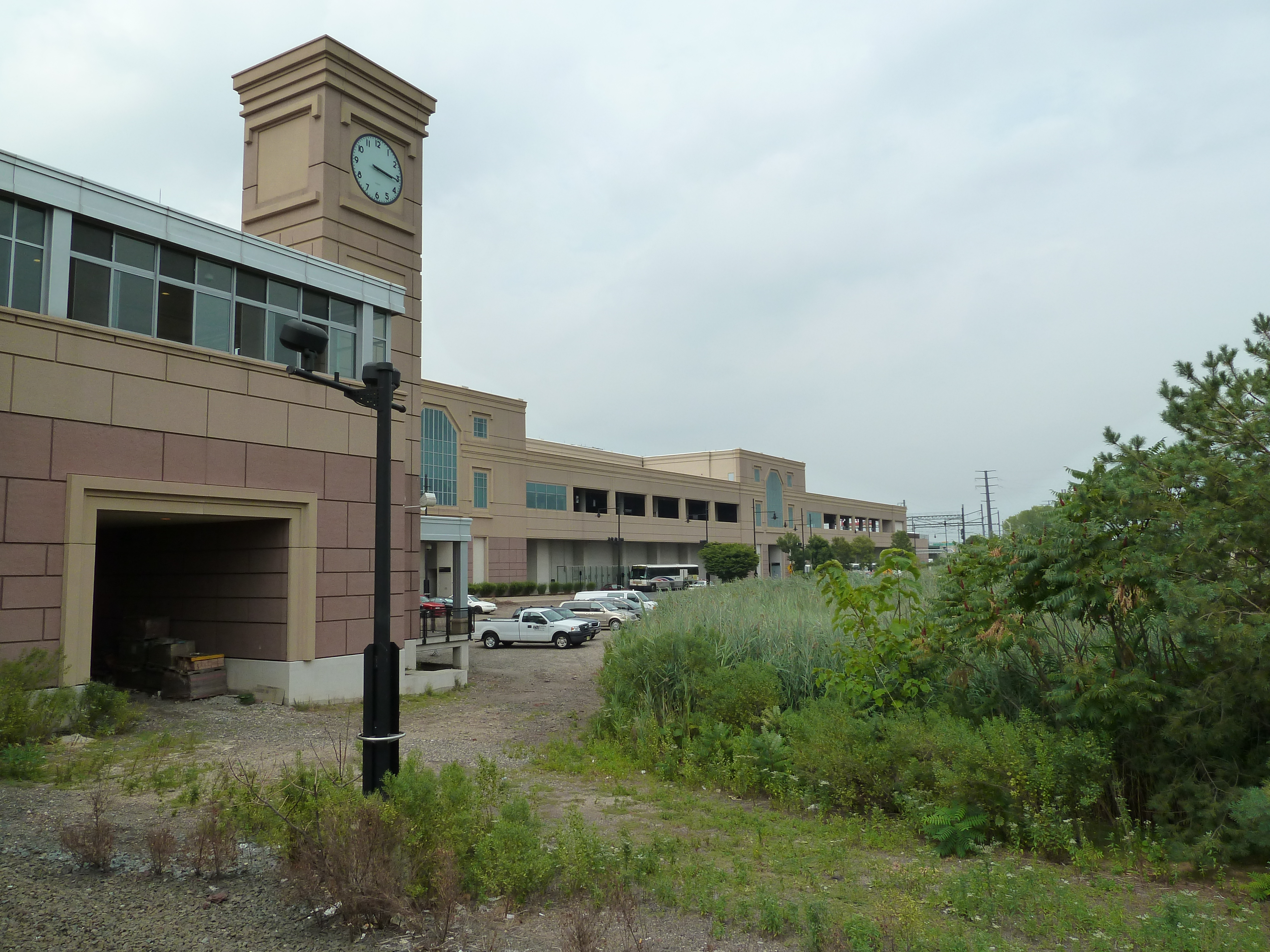
Secaucus Junction

Opened in 2003, Secaucus Junction was built as a major transfer hub for the New Jersey Transit system. Built where the Corridor crosses over the Main/Bergen/Port Jervis lines, the station allows passengers on Hoboken-bound trains to switch to trains to New York Penn Station, and vice versa. The station also allows for transfers to the Meadowlands Rail Line for service to MetLife Stadium.

== Planned improvements ==
=== North Brunswick station ===
A new station along the NEC at North Brunswick was approved by New Jersey Transit Rail Operations in 2013. In 2017, the New Jersey Legislature allocated $50 million for the project through the New Jersey Transportation Trust Fund, letting the project move forward. In 2019, the Middlesex County Improvement Authority was tasked with management of the project, a first between NJT and a county. In October 2020, the project's initial funding was approved. In October 2021, a contract with WSP USA was executed for design and engineering of the station, with it proceeding a month later. In January 2022, a consensus regarding location and design was reached. By the end of 2022, 10% of the conceptual design was approved by NJT. In February 2023, renderings and the plans for the station were revealed, and the bid for construction is set to go out by the end of 2025.

=== Mid-line loop ===
NJT currently originates trains to New York during peak hours from the Jersey Avenue station in New Brunswick. As of 2013, the agency planned to build a flying junction and balloon loop called the Mid-Line Loop south of a new station south of Jersey Avenue in North Brunswick, allowing trains to turn around, enter and leave the Northeast Corridor without crossing over tracks.

=== County Yard "train haven" ===
In January 2014, NJT awarded a $7.64-million design and engineering contract to develop a "train haven" and re-inspection facility where equipment could be stored during serious storms at an expanded and reconfigured County Yard in New Brunswick following severe flooding after Hurricane Sandy, which demonstrated the vulnerability of the agency's facilities to flooding.

== Stations ==
State	Zone	Location	Station	Miles (km)	Date opened	Date closed	Connections / notes
NY	1	Manhattan	New York Penn Station	0.0 (0.0)	1910		Amtrak (long-distance): Cardinal, Crescent, Lake Shore Limited, Palmetto, Silver Meteor; Amtrak (intercity): Acela, Adirondack, Carolinian, Empire Service, Ethan Allen Express, Keystone Service, Maple Leaf, Northeast Regional, Pennsylvanian, Vermonter; Long Island Rail Road: Babylon, Belmont Park, City Terminal Zone, Far Rockaway, Hempstead, Long Beach, Montauk, Oyster Bay, Port Jefferson, Port Washington, Ronkonkoma, West Hempstead branches NJ Transit Rail: Gladstone, Montclair–Boonton, Morristown, Raritan Valley, North Jersey Coast lines New York City Subway: (at 34th Street – Penn Station (Seventh Avenue)), (at 34th Street – Penn Station (Eighth Avenue)); New York City Bus: M7, M20, M34 SBS, M34A, Q32; Academy Bus: SIM23, SIM24; Flixbus: Eastern Shuttle; Vamoose Bus
NJ	1	Secaucus	Secaucus Junction	4.9 (8.0)	December 15, 2003		NJ Transit Rail: Bergen County, Gladstone, Main, Meadowlands, Montclair–Boonton, Morristown, Pascack Valley, Raritan Valley, and North Jersey Coast lines Metro-North Railroad: Port Jervis Line; NJ Transit Bus: 2, 78, 129, 329, 353
NJ	1	Newark	Newark Penn Station	10.0 (16.1)	March 24, 1935		Amtrak (long-distance): Cardinal, Crescent, Palmetto, Silver Meteor; Amtrak (intercity): Acela, Carolinian, Keystone Service, Northeast Regional, Pennsylvanian, Vermonter; NJ Transit Rail: North Jersey Coast and Raritan Valley lines PATH: NWK-WTC; Newark Light Rail: Grove Street – Newark Penn, Broad Street – Newark Penn; NJT Bus: 1, 5, 11, 21, 25, 28, 29, 30, 31, 34, 39, 40, 41, 44, 62, 67, 70, 71, 72, 73, 76, 78, 79, 108, 308, 319, 361, 375, 378, go25, go28 Greyhound Lines
NJ	1	Newark	South Street	11.0 (17.7)	February 14, 1904	1974–76	
NJ	1	Newark	Newark Liberty International Airport Station	12.6 (20.3)	October 21, 2001		Amtrak: Keystone Service, Northeast Regional; NJ Transit Rail: North Jersey Coast Line; AirTrain Newark
NJ	5	Elizabeth	North Elizabeth	14.4 (23.2)			NJ Transit Rail: North Jersey Coast Line; NJ Transit Bus: 112
NJ	5	Elizabeth	Elizabeth	15.4 (24.8)	December 21, 1835		NJ Transit Rail: North Jersey Coast Line; NJ Transit Bus: 24, 26, 48, 52, 56, 57, 58, 59, 62, 112
NJ	5	Elizabeth	South Elizabeth	16.1 (25.9)		1974–76	
NJ	7	Linden	Linden	18.6 (29.9)			NJ Transit Rail: North Jersey Coast Line; NJ Transit Bus: 56, 57, 94
NJ	8	Rahway	North Rahway	20.1 (32.3)		January 31, 1993	Closed due to maintenance issues
NJ	8	Rahway	Rahway	20.7 (33.3)	January 1, 1836		NJ Transit Rail: North Jersey Coast Line; NJ Transit Bus: 48; Rahway Community Shuttle
NJ	9	Iselin	Colonia	22.8 (36.7)	1876	1974–76	The station opened as "Houtenville".
NJ	9	Iselin	Iselin	24.0 (38.7)		June 11, 1972	
NJ	10	Iselin	Metropark	24.6 (39.6)	November 14, 1971		Amtrak: Acela, Crescent, Keystone Service, Northeast Regional, Vermonter; NJ Transit Bus: 48, 801, 802, 803, 804, 805
NJ	10	Menlo Park	Menlo Park	25.4 (40.9)		Early 1957	
NJ	11	Metuchen	Robinvale			1911	Robinvale station burned on March 27, 1915.
NJ	11	Metuchen	Metuchen	27.1 (43.6)	July 11, 1836		NJ Transit Bus: 810, 813, 819; Metuchen Community Shuttle
NJ	13	Edison	Edison	30.3 (48.8)	c. 1870		Edison Community Shuttle
NJ	14	New Brunswick	New Brunswick	32.7 (52.6)	January 1, 1838		Amtrak: Keystone Service, Northeast Regional; NJ Transit Bus: 810, 811, 814, 815, 818; Suburban Trails: 100, Dunellen Local; Coach USA: 100; Rutgers Campus Buses; Brunsquick Shuttles; DASH 1 & 2 New Brunswick Community Shuttle
NJ	14	New Brunswick	Jersey Avenue	34.4 (55.4)	October 24, 1963		
NJ	19	North Brunswick	Adams	36.8 (59.3)		December 3, 1967	
NJ	19	North Brunswick	North Brunswick				Proposed
NJ	19	South Brunswick	Deans	39.9 (64.2)		December 3, 1967	
NJ	19	South Brunswick	Monmouth Junction	42.4 (68.2)		December 3, 1967	
NJ	19	Plainsboro	Schalks Crossing			1914	
NJ	19	Plainsboro	Plainsboro	46.8 (75.3)	late 1910s	May 29, 1962	Razed in 1968
NJ	19	West Windsor	Princeton Junction	48.4 (77.9)	November 23, 1863		Amtrak: Keystone Service, Northeast Regional; NJ Transit: Princeton Branch; NJ Transit Bus: 600, 612
NJ	20	Lawrence	Lawrence	52.5 (84.6)	1865	1935	
NJ	20	Hamilton	Hamilton	54.4 (87.5)	February 16, 1999		NJ Transit Bus: 606, 608
NJ	22	Trenton	Trenton Transit Center	58.1 (93.5)	April 20, 1863		Amtrak: Cardinal, Carolinian, Crescent, Keystone Service, Northeast Regional, Palmetto, Pennsylvanian, Silver Meteor, Vermonter; SEPTA Regional Rail: Trenton Line; NJ Transit: River Line; NJT Bus: 409, 418, 600, 601, 604, 606, 608, 609, 611, 613, 619; SEPTA Suburban Bus: 127

== Bibliography ==
- Hart, William (2003). Images of America: Plainsboro. Mount Pleasant, SC: Arcadia Publishing. ISBN 978-0-7385-1168-9.
- Pattison, Mary (1949). Colonia Yesterday: A Biographical History of a Small Community. Little & Ives.
- Wall, John Patrick (1921). History of Middlesex County, New Jersey, 1664–1920, Volume 1. Lewis Historical Publishing Company.
