= Millstone and New Brunswick Railroad =

Branch railway line in Somerset County, New Jersey (U.S.)

The Millstone Branch as shown on a map created by the Pennsylvania Railroad in 1911

The Millstone and New Brunswick Railroad (M&NB) was chartered in the mid-19th century as a seven-mile long branch line from New Brunswick, New Jersey to East Millstone, New Jersey. Construction was completed and the line began operation on December 19, 1854. In 1871, under the order of the company's president Martin Howell, the M&NB signed a 999-year lease with the United Jersey Railroad Company, which would later become part of the Pennsylvania Railroad (PRR) known as the "Millstone Branch." In 1915, the company was dissolved and became part of the United Jersey Railroad Company.

== History ==
=== Intended connection westward ===
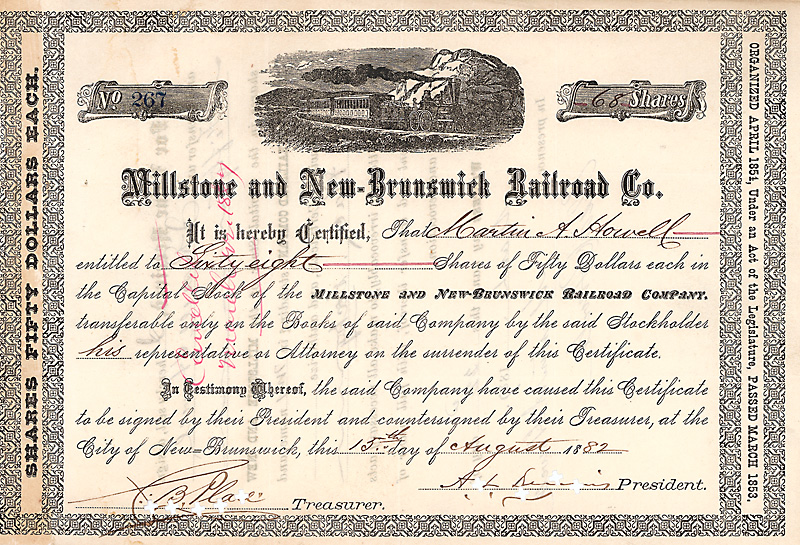
Share of the Millstone & New-Brunswick Railroad Co. from February 20, 1883

The M&NB was originally intended to cross the Millstone River and connect to western points in 1874 via the ill-fated Mercer & Somerset Railway (M&S), a short-lived line of PRR in western New Jersey.

M&S ran from Somerset Junction on the Belvidere Delaware Rail Road via Pennington and Hopewell to Millstone, with an intended connection to the Millstone & New Brunswick Railroad, via a bridge across the Millstone River, for a through route to New Brunswick.

M&S was abandoned in 1880 after filing for bankruptcy, and the connection over the Millstone River to M&NB was never built, except for a stone pillar in the middle of the Millstone River that remains today.

=== Passenger service ===
The Millstone Branch boasted 12 daily passenger trains East Millstone to New York City. Passenger stations, which consisted of small wooden shacks, were located at East Millstone, South Middlebush Road, Clyde Road, Voorhees (now Route 27), and Jersey Avenue. Passenger service permitted Millstone residents easy access to New Brunswick for shopping on weekends and allowed New York City businessmen the opportunity to commute. With the advent of the automobile, all passenger service ended in 1930. After that year the track past Route 27 (Voorhees) was used sporadically by a local freight train to access the rubber factory in East Millstone; track became weed-covered and maintenance deferred. The stations at Clyde and Voorhees were abandoned on June 8, 1932. The last passenger station to survive was Middlebush, which was razed in 1948.

=== 1960s to the 1980s ===
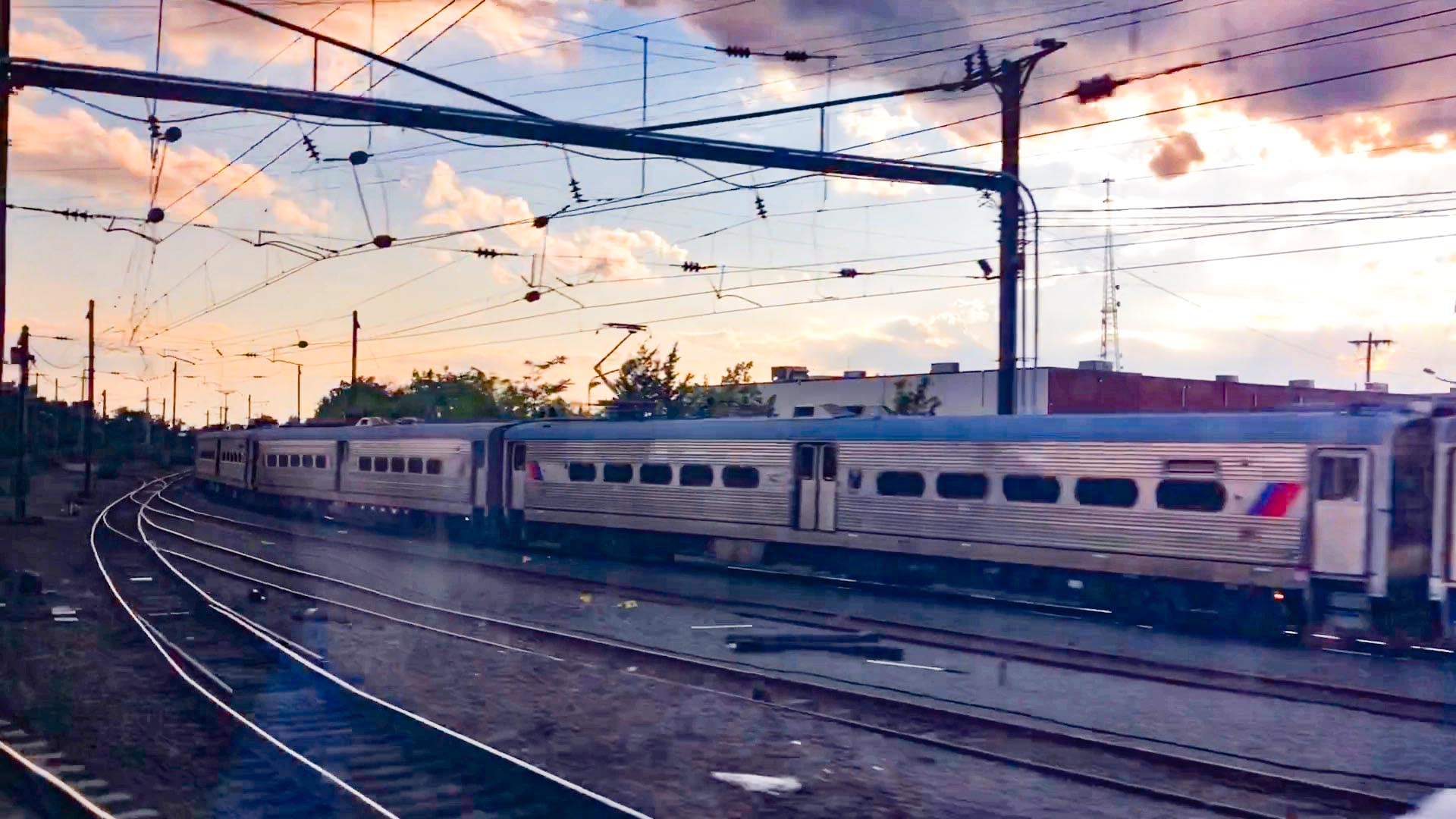
Millstone branch, as it splits off the Northeast Corridor (to the right)

The Jersey Avenue Park & Ride station operated by NJ Transit (NJT) opened October 24, 1963 by the Pennsylvania Railroad and uses part of the old branch. In an effort to cut costs, PRR merged with the New York Central Railroad to form the Penn Central Transportation Company (PC) in 1968. The Millstone Branch remained intact and active as far east as East Millstone to a rubber reclaiming facility located at the end of the branch until 1972 when the branch west of Clyde Road was abandoned. PC wanted to abandon the line but was required by federal law to serve any customers who wanted rail service regardless of profitability. During the first six months of 1972, PC delivered only six carloads to the rubber factory, earning $1,383 in revenue; the cost to PC for making those deliveries was $3,862. PC filed for bankruptcy in 1970, and sold all railroad assets to the new government-created Conrail (CR) on April 1, 1976. PC only sold the portion of the Millstone Branch up to South Middlebush Road to CR while retaining ownership of the South Middlebush Road–East Millstone section.

In 1971 several warehouses were built along Clyde Road, three of which had rail spurs installed and connected to the line. However, only Hermann Warehouse Corporation utilized rail. One of the rail spurs has since been removed, never having been used.

Trackage west of Clyde Road to the East Millstone terminus was abandoned and removed in summer 1980 (a small section of track remains buried in brush William and Market Streets in East Millstone). Motorists complained that the poorly maintained grade crossing near Colonial Park was causing damage to their cars. By this time, there were no active customers past the Route 27 crossing; the branch fell into disrepair and became overgrown with vegetation. For the next 30 years, the line west of Route 27 remained active to provide service to Hermann Warehouse Corp. CR upgrade the remaining infrastructure, replacing ties, switches, and brush. New ballast was also laid.

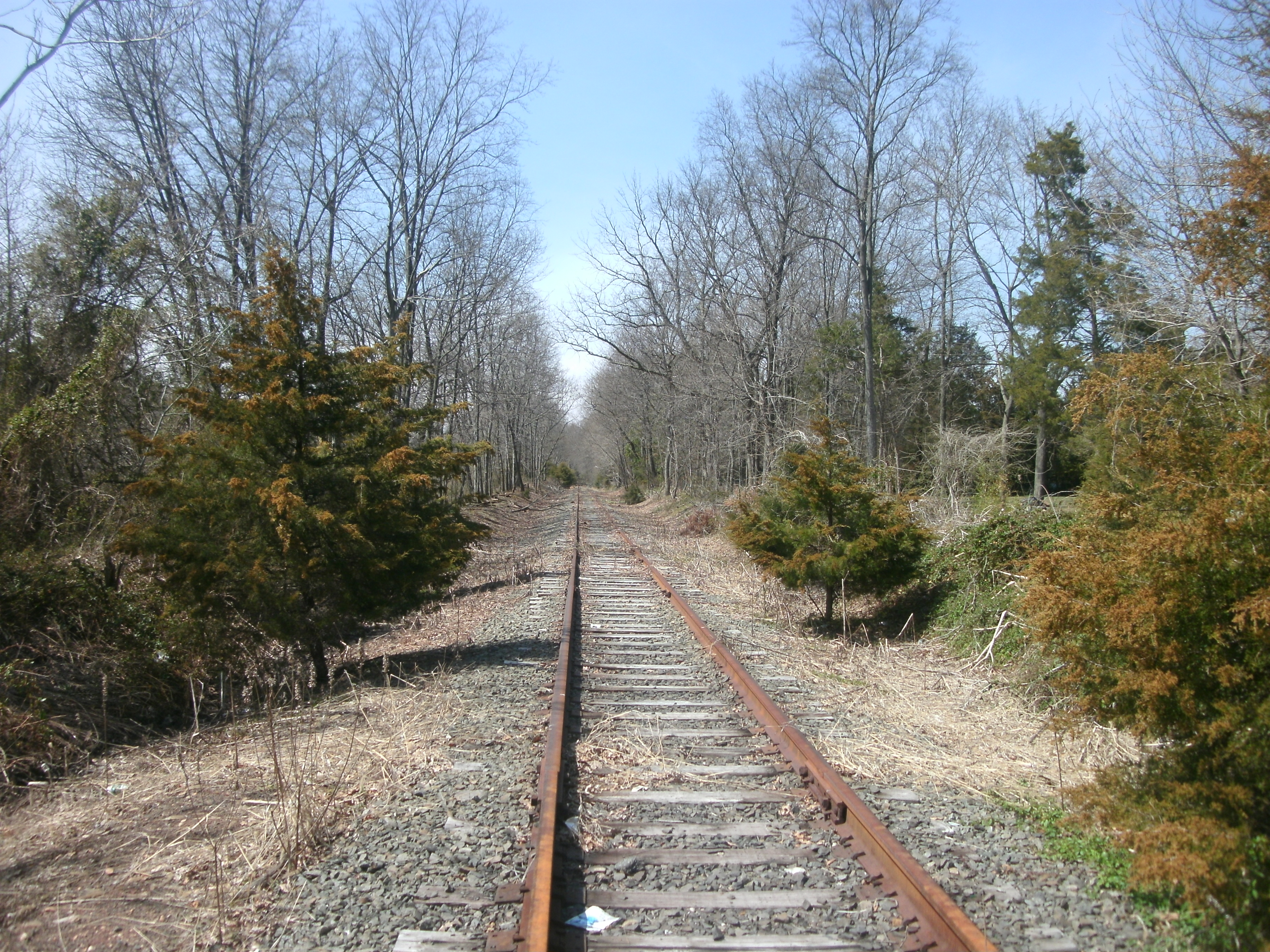
Millstone Branch at Clyde Road in April 2011, after track rehabilitation

=== Present conditions ===
After branching off Amtrak's Northeast Corridor at County Interlocking, the Millstone Branch begins with the use of NJT trains terminating at the Jersey Avenue station. Track currently ends at a point between Clyde and Dahmer Road crossings. In 2001 three luxury homes on the outskirts of East Millstone were built on top of the right-of-way that borders Colonial Park. In 2006 a new housing development was built west of Dahmer Road; backyards and driveways of several houses were constructed on top of the former roadbed. The bridge pillar in the middle of the Millstone River which was intended to carry the tracks to M&S still stands. The engine house and wye track in East Millstone are now a grass field.

What remains of the Millstone Branch is currently owned and served by Norfolk Southern Railway (NS). Service is provided by the "Metuchen local" that works the branch late at night (12am-2am) a few times per week. The branch is now referred to as the "Millstone Secondary" in Amtrak, NJT, and NS timetables. As of 2011, Hermann Warehouse Corp re-located out of the Clyde Road facility and there has not been rail service into that building since then. A bumper was placed east of the Somerset Road/Route 27 crossing, with Clyde Road, Veronica Avenue and Route 27 crossings currently out of service. Jersey Avenue/Route 91 remains the sole active crossing on the line.

== Station listing ==
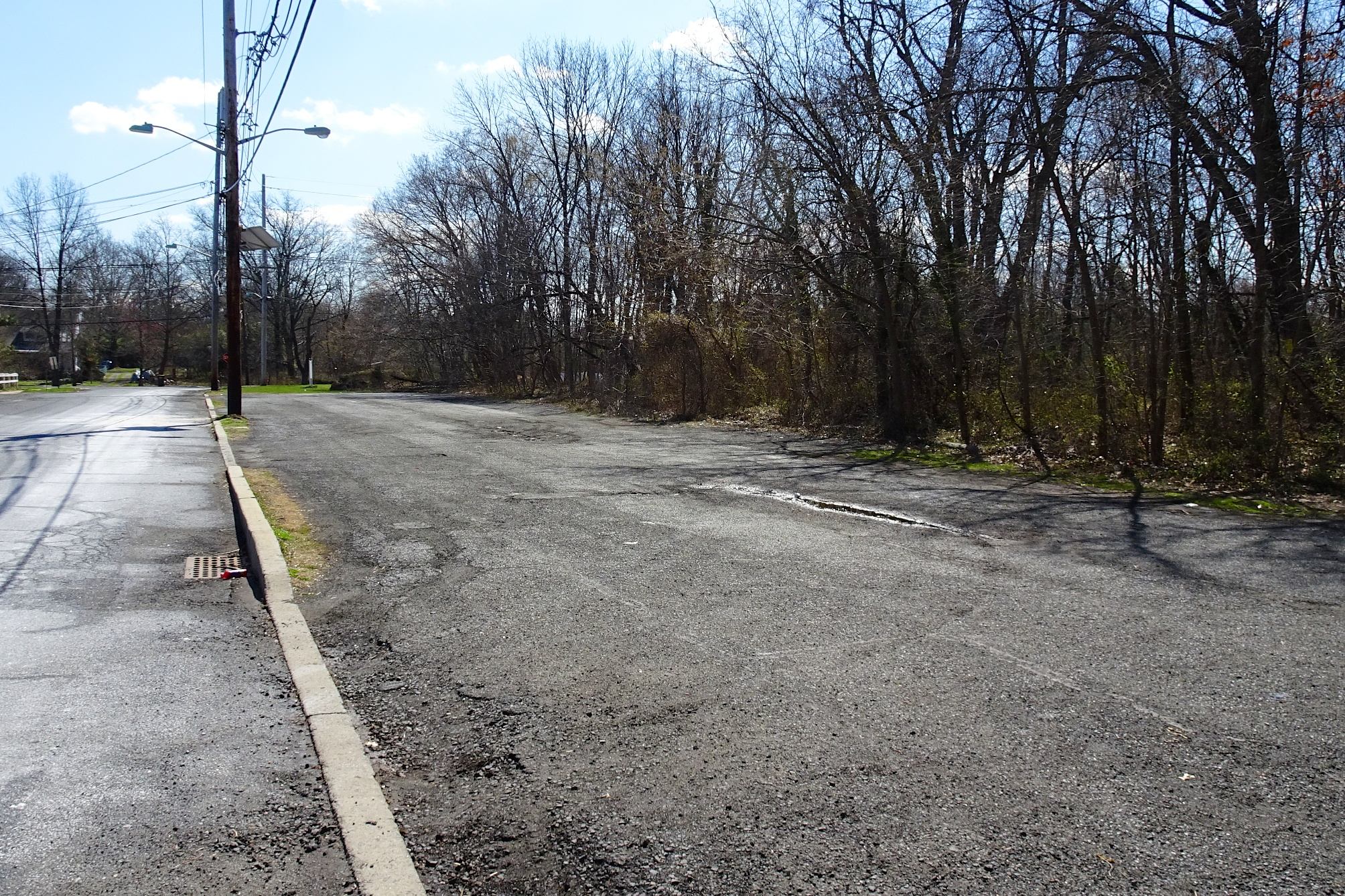
Site of former Middlebush station. Trackage through here was dismantled in 1980.

Station	Location	Opened	Rebuilt	Agency closed	Station closed	Notes
Vorhees	New Brunswick	—	—	—	1930	Station was located at grade crossing with Route 27. The station at Vorhees was abandoned on June 8, 1932.
Clyde	Franklin Township	—	—	—	1930	Located at intersection with Clyde Road in Franklin. The station at Clyde was abandoned on June 8, 1932.
Middlebush	Franklin Township	—	—	—	1930	Located at intersection with South Middlebush Road and Railroad Avenue. The railroad razed the depot at Middlebush in 1948.
Somerset Stock Farm	Franklin Township	—	—	—	—	
Mettlers	Franklin Township	—	—	—	—	
East Millstone	East Millstone	—	—	—	1930	

== See also ==
- County Yard
