= Jersey Avenue station =

NJ Transit rail station

Jersey Avenue
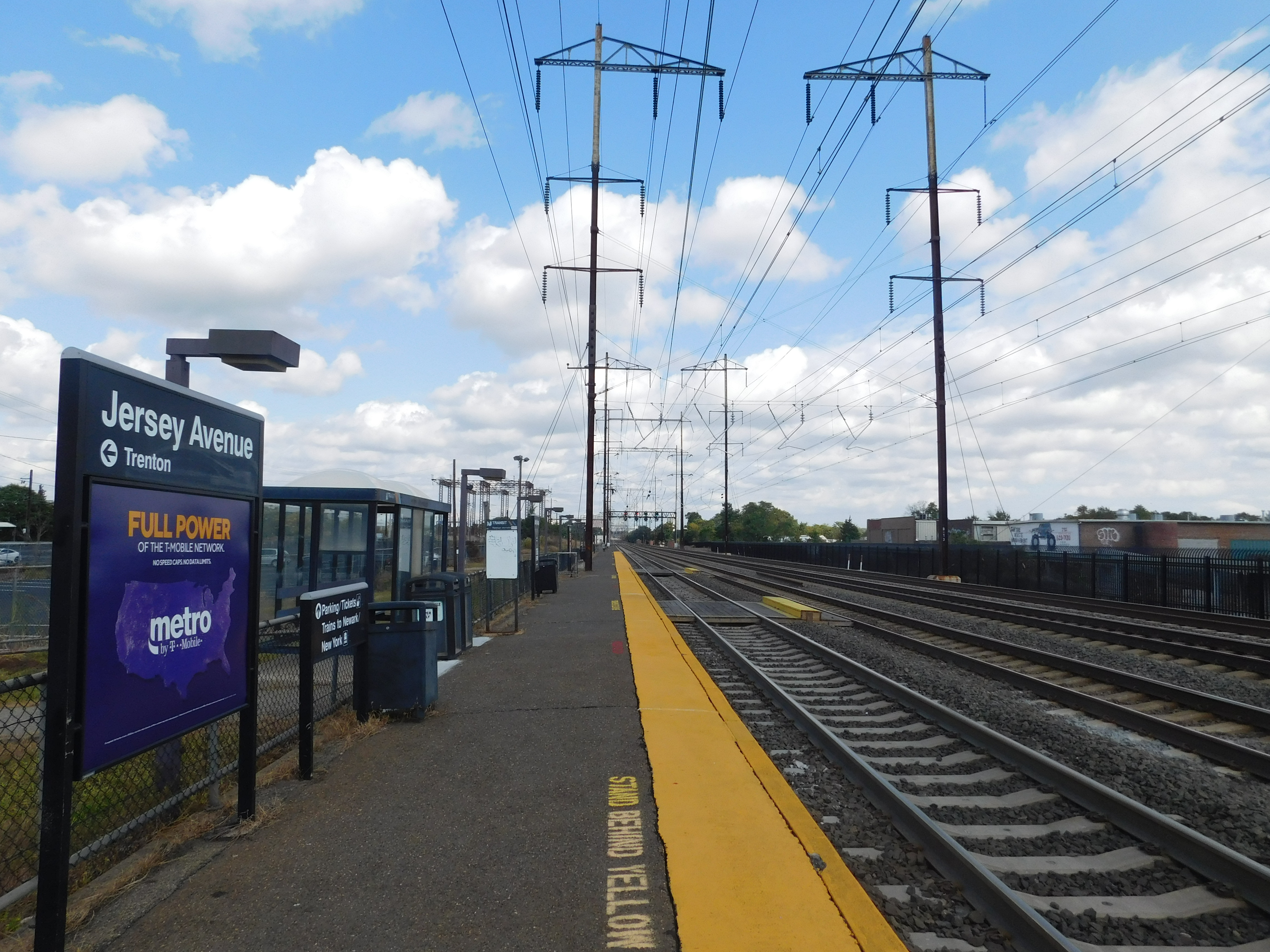
- The 1971-built platform for NJ Transit trains going to Trenton Transit Center in September 2020. New York-bound trains do not use this track when stopping at Jersey Avenue.

General information
- Location: 584 Jersey Avenue (Route 91), New Brunswick, New Jersey 08901; United States
- Coordinates: 40.478194°N 74.470997°W
- Owner: New Jersey Transit
- Line: Amtrak Northeast Corridor
- Platforms: 2 low-level side platforms
- Tracks: 5

Construction
- Parking: Yes
- Cycle facilities: Yes

Other information
- Fare zone: 14

History
- Opened: October 27, 1963

Passengers
- 2025: 619 (average weekday)
- Rank: 46 of 153

Services
Preceding station	NJ Transit	Following station
Princeton Junction toward Trenton	Northeast Corridor Line weekdays	New Brunswick toward New York
Former services
Preceding station	Pennsylvania Railroad	Following station
Terminus	New Brunswick Line	New Brunswick toward New York
Location

Jersey Avenue is a New Jersey Transit station on the Northeast Corridor Line in New Brunswick, New Jersey. It is near Jersey Avenue (Route 91), in an industrial area next to a New Jersey Transit rail yard. Unlike all other stations on the NJ Transit Northeast Corridor Line, Jersey Avenue has low-level platforms (the rest are elevated), and, since there is no wheelchair ramp, it is the only station on the line that is not handicapped-accessible. Jersey Avenue opened in October 1963 as part of an experimental park and ride program.

Jersey Avenue has a different layout than most New Jersey Transit stations. It has two platforms: a southbound platform on the main line for trains heading south toward Trenton Transit Center, and a northbound platform on a siding behind the southbound platform for trains heading north toward New York Penn Station. The platforms are separated by a parking lot. There is no platform on the northbound main line, so northbound trains from Trenton cannot serve Jersey Avenue. About a third of the southbound trains that stop at Jersey Avenue do terminate there, using the siding. Jersey Avenue station is the only station on the Northeast Corridor Line that does not have weekend service.

In April 2014 NJT approved a contract for a design for relocation and rebuilding the station platform to permit high-level boarding, along with pedestrian overpass, vertical circulation, improved parking, and bus connection areas, as well as improvements to 5 miles of the existing Delco freight line to make it a 130 kilometers per hour (80 miles per hour) main line track for passenger trains. As of 2015, additional design and engineering work to reconfigure the station was funded, but no construction date had been scheduled.

== History ==
=== Proposal and opening (1962–1965) ===
Hebert Thomas, the chief of rail transit for the New Jersey State Highway Department announced a $400 million proposal in March 1962 that would involve the construction of multiple park and ride facilities along the Pennsylvania Railroad main line. One of these would include a new station west of downtown New Brunswick to replace the station downtown.

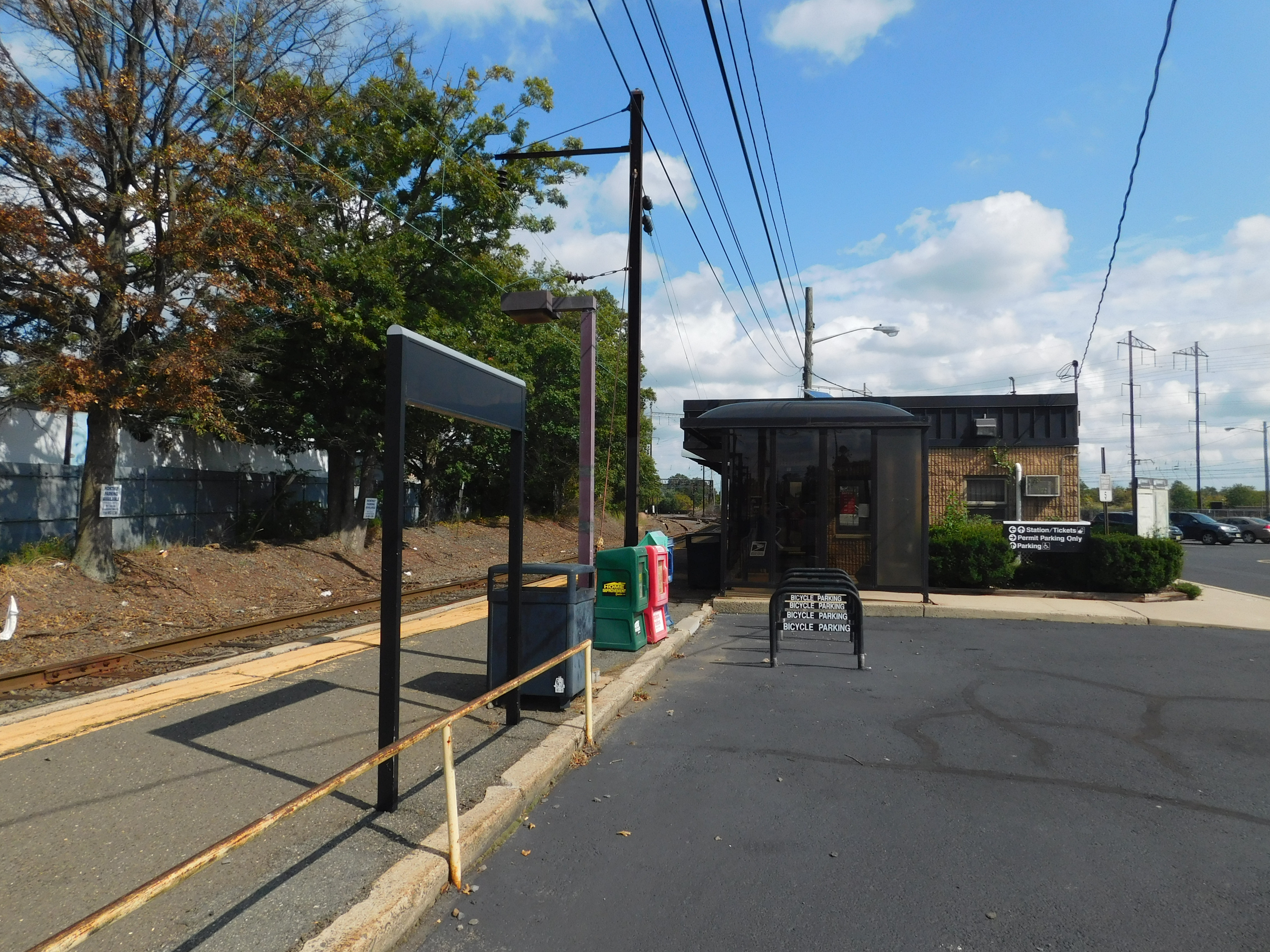
The eastbound tracks and platform at Jersey Avenue station in 2020

In May 1962, the Tri-State Transportation Committee, a conglomerate of officials from New Jersey, New York and Connecticut formed to improve mass transit in the area around New York City, proposed a new park and ride in the area of Van Dyke Avenue and Jersey Avenue (NJ 91) in New Brunswick at the local railroad yard. This new station would be located where the former Millstone Branch diverted from the main line. It would only serve local trains and no through main line trains would stop at it. Through services would continue to use the downtown station in New Brunswick.

In its decision making, the Committee noted that the city of New Brunswick had become a victim of new commuter bus services taken away from its railroad ridership harder than other areas along the Pennsylvania Railroad. By building a new station to attract new ridership, they hoped to reverse the trend and prove that rail service would still be viable. The new station would be paid by the Federal Housing Act of 1961 and the rest by at least one of the state of New Jersey, the city of New Brunswick or the Pennsylvania Railroad. New Jersey had already shown support with their announcement in March and the railroad was willing to update schedules for a new service.

The proposal for a new station was met with mixed reviews by commercial businesses in New Brunswick. Some thought the new station was a good idea, including that the commuter business in downtown New Brunswick was already not as prominent as it had been in recent years. However, several thought it was a bad idea and would pull business away from downtown New Brunswick and closer to the suburbs. They noted that the departure of Mack Trucks and the closure of Camp Kilmer had already hurt the city from a business perspective and that downtown New Brunswick was already struggling. The concern would be that the new station would lead to further development outside of downtown, which would continue to rot in their perspective.

In June 1962, Thomas announced that the new $183,250 station would have free parking for 300 cars. The fare to go to the new station would be the same as the fare to go to downtown New Brunswick and the hope was the new station would eliminate commuter congestion in the city. Karl Metzger, the Director of the Middlesex County Board of Freeholders, added that some might park at the new station and take a train to the downtown station for shopping and that there should be a 5¢ train for those who wanted to do the shopping and back trip. Thomas and Roger Gilman, the director of the Tri-State Transportation Committee, tried to quell fears that this station would eliminate the downtown stop and hurt the city further, reiterating that through trains would all stop at the downtown stop and that all new local trains beginning at the new station would stop at the downtown station anyway.

In December 1962, United States Senator Harrison A. Williams (D–NJ) announced that a federal grant of $170,790 would be provided for the construction of a new station at Jersey Avenue. This new station would be an experimental stop and that it would operate for at least one calendar year. If successful, the new station would become a permanent part of the schedule and that it would be a good testament to reviving rail ridership if new modern facilities were provided. The rest of the project would be funded by the State Highway Department's Division of Railroad Transportation and the Tri-State Transportation Committee.

Ground was broken for the new project on July 16, 1963 with Governor of New Jersey Richard J. Hughes and Harrison Williams at the ceremonies. The new station, at a total cost of $256,185, would be ready to open in October. Hughes also spoke at the groundbreaking about the $750 million state bond issue that would be a boost to transportation and education in New Jersey. Construction of the new station and its parking lot came from Rule Construction of New Brunswick for $81,499.

Hughes also attended the opening of the new station on October 24, 1963, with 150 people in attendance. The new station had a prefabricated steel building with a waiting room, a ticket office and restrooms for commuters. Jersey Avenue station would begin operating on October 27, 1963 with nine trains in the morning and 13 trains in the afternoon making round trips between Jersey Avenue and New York Pennsylvania Station. The new station would be open for 18 months for the experimental testing. The proposal was an early success, noting that by 8 a.m., 110 people had already used the new station to commute, with 92 cars in the parking lot. Starting on October 29, eight buses operated by Suburban Transit would be extended from downtown New Brunswick to the Jersey Avenue station to help promote use of the new station.

By January 1964, the Jersey Avenue station had been considered a success, with a 7 percent increase in rail ridership on Pennsylvania Railroad trains after opening. 157 people on average used Jersey Avenue station for eastbound trains in November 1962 and 162 in December 1962. Westbound train service was 141 and 146. The car rate increased to 100. Downtown ridership at the downtown New Brunswick station did not shift much in the same time period, losing only four riders on average from 2,117 to 2,113. The Pennsylvania Railroad and state of New Jersey added service from Jersey Avenue to Penn Station on April 26, 1964. This upgrade included five new trains, three heading for New York and two more heading for Jersey Avenue. They also announced that time between the two locations would also be improved. By November 1964, an average of 211 cars used the Jersey Avenue parking lot and local demand was to ensure that the station would continue to be open after the end of the 18-month experimental period.

Dwight Palmer, the State Highway Commissioner announced in late April 1965 that the Jersey Avenue station would continue to be open after the ending of the 18-month experiment. As part of the decision, state officials asked that the city take over operations of the park and ride on a financial basis, to which New Brunswick officials declined. As a result, the parking lot would become a pay parking facility rather than a free one with a 50¢ charge for parking. However, they noted that discussions were still underway for continuing the park and ride. However, the station would remain free instead.

=== Improvements (1971–1986) ===
The new Penn Central Railroad announced on April 20, 1971 that they would be increasing fares by 25 percent on January 1, 1971. As part of the agreement to raise fares, officials announced that they would expand the station at Jersey Avenue. This expansion would bring the lot capacity from 380 to 440. As of the point of the announcement, an average of 640 people was using Jersey Avenue station to commute on the 23 trains, resulting in the parking lot overflowing to Jersey Avenue on the side of the entrance road. A new train would be added eastbound, leaving Jersey Avenue at 8:20 a.m. and getting to New York Pennsylvania Station at 9:15 a.m. The last part of the announcement is the construction on the westbound side of the main line of a new platform, facilitating service towards Trenton. A late evening train that used to terminate at Jersey Avenue would move to Trenton and upon completion of the new platform, would service Jersey Avenue once again. This new train would begin operation on May 24, 1971.

In November 1971, Penn Central announced that the new platform at Jersey Avenue would open beginning on November 14 with the introduction of its autumn schedules. With the new platform in place, 41 new trains would service Jersey Avenue station on a weekly basis. This included six additional trains on weekdays, seven on Saturdays and three on Sundays and various holidays, adding to the 24 that terminate at Jersey Avenue.

J&L Parking, the subcontractor that operated the parking lot for Penn Central announced in October 1974 that the station would no longer be a free parking lot. Due to the 1973 oil crisis, Penn Central stated that they needed a new company to run the lot and that they would need a parking fee for raising funds. As part of the agreement, the lot would get an extra ten spaces, expanding official capacity to 450. However, they would also ban people from parking along the tracks where the overload of cars had been parking. The new 50¢ parking lot fee would be collected by a person during the morning rush hour load and a coin machine would handle the rest of the facility's parking fares.

Opposition to the new parking fee was almost immediate. South Brunswick Township passed a resolution on November 19, 1974 that opposed the fee. With protests after the announcement, the level of angst reached the state government in Trenton. Arthur Penn, the Director of Public Interest at the newly-formed Department of Public Advocate, wrote to the State Transportation Commissioner Alan Sanger that the railroad's decision to implement a parking fare structure at Jersey Avenue station was a possible illegal act on constitutional grounds and a poor look ethically. Penn argued that the state allowing the railroad to do it was a possible violation of law preventing the use of state fund donations for private companies. He considered it a fare increase and that public hearings should have been held before the fare was implemented. Because of the parking fee, the city of New Brunswick removed the railroad's tax exemption in February 1975. The 4-acre (1.6 ha) lot would command over $2,700 in taxes and $18,800 on other properties the railroad owned within the city with an assessment of $60,000. Because of the parking fare, the state made it unenforceable by creating a law that prevented the parking fee on lands built with public funds.

With the introduction of Conrail in 1976, ownership of the station switched to Amtrak, which took over the tracks on the main line and the stations along the alignment.

In February 1979, Mayor John A. Lynch Jr. announced that they were looking at leasing the downtown and Jersey Avenue stations from the state of New Jersey. Louis Gambaccini, the State Transportation Commissioner, announced that they were offering the station buildings at stops for $1 a year. This was despite a recent rejection because rents of the facilities of the downtown station was not enough to make up for the costs of maintenance. However, when the city was informed they could also get the Jersey Avenue station, they felt that charging parking lot fees would make up for the loss at the downtown station. J&L, continuing the Penn Central lease under Amtrak, announced that the 50¢ fare would be upgraded to 60¢ in February 1980 due to company expanses in having security on the property due to local vandalism. Local Conrail staff and commuters noted that the attendant would collect the morning fares and leave, leaving the station unstaffed for the rest of the day. Amtrak stated that they should have an attendant at the station all day.

At the same time, Amtrak announced it was moving the ownership of the station from itself to NJ Transit, the new state agency for operating railroads and busses in New Jersey. NJ Transit officials added that they would like to offer the operation of the parking lot and Jersey Avenue station platforms to the city. Lynch added that they were waiting on a $6 million grant from the Urban Mass Transportation Administration to renovate the downtown station. However, they would not take over Jersey Avenue without the grant. By February 24, the City Council announced that they were finishing the final application for the grant, totaling to $6.8 million. With the grant in hand, Lynch added that the city would take over the operation of both stations, eliminating J&L's involvement, and that would result in more security at the Jersey Avenue station. This would be included as part of the Parking Authority's plans to expand the Ferren Parking deck downtown and construction of a new downtown bus station and a new pedestrian walkway to the new parking deck over French Street (NJ 27). 200 more parking spaces would also be added for commuters to use. In early March 1980, the New Jersey Department of Transportation told Lynch that they would offer a grant from a state transportation bond for improvements to both stations. $350,000 would be provided for expanding the parking lot at Jersey Avenue station.

In December 1982, Middlesex County Freeholder David Crabiel stated that NJ Transit was looking at cutting facilities at Jersey Avenue station as part of financial stability concerns. This included closing the station depot at Jersey Avenue station, removing access to the waiting room, the ticket agent and restroom facilities for commuters. City Administrator Stanley Marcinczyk pushed the city to take over the downtown and Jersey Avenue stations. As part of the use of funding from the grant, the new station parking lot would gain 50 new parking spaces. It also would extend the platform from 300 feet (91 m) to 500 feet (150 m) and adding a canopy on it for 200 feet (61 m).

In February 1983, Marcinczyk announced that NJ Transit finished acquisition of the downtown and Jersey Avenue stations in New Brunswick from Amtrak. Marcinczyk added that they came to an agreement with NJ Transit to lease the stations to operate the facilities. NJ Transit would maintain two leases, one for each station through 1988 with an option for an extension to 1993. 25¢ of every dollar spent would go to operate the Jersey Avenue station, including an expansion of the station parking lot from 440 to 700 spaces. The rest of the money would go to downtown station. Any revenues beyond that would be split between the city and NJ Transit. Marcinczyk added that the Jersey Avenue station would generate the majority of the revenue for the city and that it would also get new improved lighting in addition to the proposed improvements in December 1982. He added that Jersey Avenue would receive its upgrades first. New Brunswick City Council agreed to create an ordinance on July 5 to take over both stations in New Brunswick. In January 1984, NJ Transit officialized the lease of both stations and guaranteed $3 million for improvement of both stations. With construction beginning in Spring 1984, Jersey Avenue station would get a new station building and its expanded parking.

In December 1984, Marcinczyk added that Triangle Fidelco, a local company on Jersey Avenue, would offer up some unused land for more parking for commuters. As part of a new lease agreement of $650 per month, the lot would add 140 new parking spaces. NJ Transit would approve it and that the agency and the Department of Transportation would install the lot and put lighting in. The new lot opened on January 28, 1985, adding 100 spaces for commuters on a monthly permit basis. This lot would serve as a temporary lot until the new upgraded station at Jersey Avenue station was finished. The new station opened in April 1986.

== Station layout and services ==
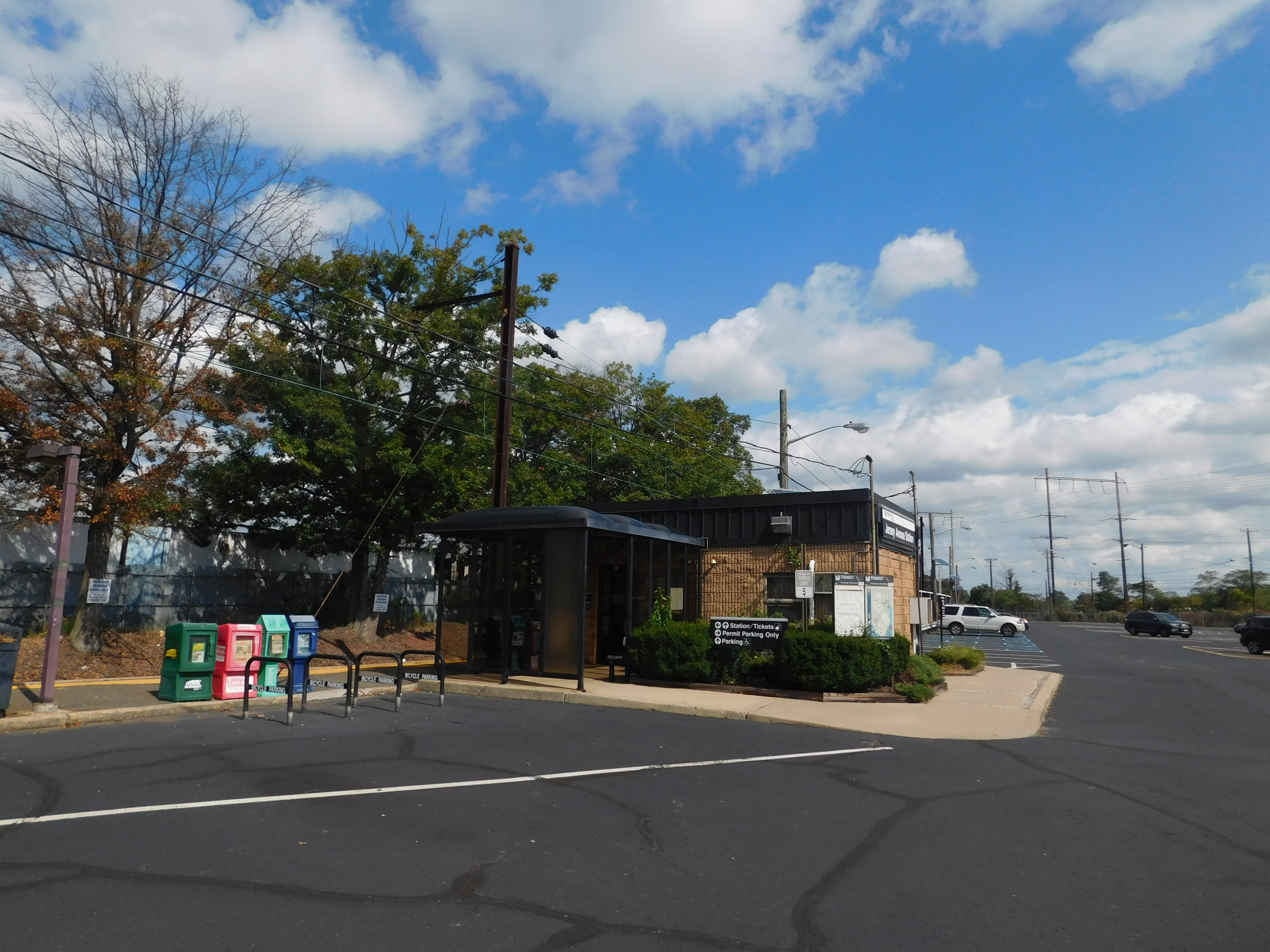
The 1986-built station depot along the eastbound platform at Jersey Avenue in 2020

Jersey Avenue station has an unusual design compared to the stations along the Northeast Corridor Line. The station contains two low-level side platforms, one of which is on a siding track towards the namesake Jersey Avenue. The other is on the main Northeast Corridor Line tracks, but only on the westbound side. There is no eastbound platform along the Northeast Corridor tracks. All eastbound service to Penn Station in New York City from Jersey Avenue originates from Jersey Avenue station via equipment stored at County Yard. The westbound platform services only trains going to Trenton Transit Center. All Amtrak services bypass the station. Due to the station having low-level platforms, it is the only Northeast Corridor Line station that is not handicap-accessible. The station has a single station depot on the inner eastbound platform. A ticket agent is staffed in the waiting room during morning rush hours. There are two ticket vending machines also on the same platform.

The station contains three separate parking lots, operated by the New Brunswick Parking Authority. Two are on the main station lot, with 844 spaces available along with 22 handicap-accessible spaces. The third lot is across Jersey Avenue from the station, offering 540 more spaces and six more handicap-accessible stations. Parking is permit only except at nights at the main station lots. The separate lot allows free parking on weekends.

Jersey Avenue station, along with the downtown New Brunswick station, are both in NJ Transit fare zone 14.

== See also ==
- New Jersey Route 91
- County Yard
- Millstone Branch
