= Newark =

Newark most commonly refers to:

- Newark, New Jersey, city in the United States
- Newark Liberty International Airport, New Jersey; a major air hub in the New York metropolitan area

Newark may also refer to:

== Places ==
=== Canada ===
- Niagara-on-the-Lake, Ontario, once called Newark

=== Germany ===
- Neuwerk (Archaic English: Newark), an island and quarter of Hamburg

=== United Kingdom ===
- Newark-on-Trent, Nottinghamshire, England
  - Newark and Sherwood, a local government district
  - Newark (UK Parliament constituency)
  - Newark Wapentake, a former administrative division
- Newark, Peterborough in Cambridgeshire, a hamlet
- Port Glasgow, Scotland, called Newark until 1667

=== United States ===
- Newark, Arkansas
- Newark, California
- Newark, Delaware
- Newark, Illinois
- Newark, Indiana
- Newark, Maryland
- Newark, Missouri
- Newark, Nebraska
- Newark, New Jersey
- Newark, New York
- Newark, Ohio
- Newark, South Dakota
- Newark, Texas
- Newark, Vermont
- Newark, West Virginia
- Newark, Wisconsin
- Newark Islands, Sodus Bay, New York
- Newark Township (disambiguation)

== Other uses ==
- Newark (company), American electronic components distribution company
- HMS Newark, various ships of the Royal Navy
- USS Newark, various ships of the United States Navy
- Newark Academy (disambiguation)
- Newark High School (disambiguation)
- Newark Castle (disambiguation)
- Newark station (disambiguation)
- Newark Valley (disambiguation)
- Roman Catholic Archdiocese of Newark, New Jersey
- Newark cipher, a variation of the Pigpen cipher system
- Newark Park, a country house and estate in Gloucestershire, England
