= Newark (Amtrak station) =

Newark (Amtrak station) may refer to:

- Newark Liberty International Airport Station, a rail station in New Jersey
- Newark Penn Station, a major transportation hub in New Jersey
- Newark station (Delaware), a rail station in Delaware
