= Newark station =

Newark station may refer to:

== United Kingdom ==
- Newark Castle railway station, Newark-on-Trent, Nottinghamshire, on the Nottingham to Lincoln line
- Newark Northgate railway station, Newark-on-Trent, Nottinghamshire on the East Coast Main Line

== United States ==
=== Newark, Delaware ===
- Newark station (Delaware)

=== Newark, New Jersey ===
- Newark Broad Street station, a New Jersey Transit commuter rail station
- Newark Broad Street station (Central Railroad of New Jersey), a disused station
- Newark Liberty International Airport Station, a rail station
- Newark Penn Station, a major transportation hub

== See also ==
- List of Newark City Subway stations in Newark, New Jersey and its suburbs
