= South Street station (Pennsylvania Railroad) =

South Street
- Graphic designs of the South Street station in the Railroad Gazette in 1904.

General information
- Location: South Street between McCarter Highway (Route 21) and Mulberry Street, Newark, New Jersey
- Coordinates: 40°43′24″N 74°10′32.5″W
- Platforms: 2 low-level side platforms

History
- Opened: February 14, 1904
- Closed: c. October 1975

Key dates
- November 1951: Station agent eliminated

Former services
Preceding station	Pennsylvania Railroad	Following station
Elizabeth toward Chicago	Main Line	Newark toward New York or Exchange Place
Waverly toward New Brunswick	New Brunswick Line	Newark toward New York or Exchange Place
Waverly toward New Brunswick	New Brunswick Line	Newark Market Street (until 1935) toward New York or Exchange Place
Location

South Street is a closed commuter railroad station in the city of Newark, Essex County, New Jersey. Located at the intersection of the eponymous South Street and State Route 21 (McCarter Highway), the station served local trains of the Pennsylvania Railroad and its successor, Penn Central Railroad. The station, one of three in Newark (along with Newark Penn Station and a stop in the Waverly section of Newark), contained two low-level side platforms and shelters to protect riders. Remains of a branch track cross South Street via a bridge next to current Northeast Corridor Line, operated by Amtrak and NJ Transit.

South Street station opened on February 14, 1904, replacing two at-grade stops at Emmet Street and Chestnut Street in the city as part of construction for a new elevated trackway for the Pennsylvania Railroad main line through the city. The station continued as a stop on local trains until 1975, when it was closed along with South Elizabeth and Colonia stations as part of Penn Central Railroad's budget cuts.

== Cancelled PATH proposal ==
A proposal to build a PATH station near the South Street station was abandoned. However, this was mixed up with the new station planned to be in the south ward, and politicians responded with anger to the Port Authority as a result. The Port Authority later explained the misunderstanding and that the South Ward project was not cancelled but still in the planning phase.
