= Newark High School =

Newark High School may refer to:

- Newark High School (Delaware), Newark, Delaware
- Newark High School (Ohio), Newark, Ohio
- The Lilley and Stone Girls' School, known as Newark High School, Newark, England
- Newark Catholic High School, Newark, Ohio
- Newark Memorial High School, Newark, California
- Barringer High School, Newark, New Jersey (The name was changed from Newark High School in 1907.)

== See also ==
- Newark Academy (disambiguation)
- Newark (disambiguation)
