= HMS Newark =

Three ships of the Royal Navy have borne the name HMS Newark, after the town Newark-on-Trent:

- HMS Newark (1695), 80-gun third rate ship of the line that was launched in 1695 and served until 1787
- HMS Newark (1918), a Hunt-class minesweeper laid down as Newlyn and commissioned in 1918. She was broken up in 1928.
- HMS Newark (G08), the Wickes-class destroyer USS Ringgold (DD-89) that served in the Royal Navy between 1940 and 1947

== See also ==
- Newark (disambiguation)
