= USS Newark =

Multiple ships of the United States Navy have been named USS Newark, after the city of Newark, New Jersey.

- USS Newark (C-1) was a protected cruiser in service from 1891 to 1912.
- USS Newark (SP-266) was a minesweeper and tug in commission from 1917 to 1919.
- USS Newark (CL-88) was a planned Cleveland-class light cruiser; construction was cancelled in 1940.
- USS Newark (CL-100) was a Cleveland-class light cruiser that was converted during construction to the Independence-class light aircraft carrier USS San Jacinto (CVL-30).
- USS Newark (CL-108) was a planned Fargo-class light cruiser; construction was cancelled in 1945.
