= Newark Academy (disambiguation) =

Newark Academy may refer to:

- Newark Academy, a private school in Livingston, New Jersey, United States
- The Newark Academy, a secondary school in Balderton, Nottinghamshire, England
- Newark Collegiate Academy, a high school located in Newark, New Jersey, United States

== See also ==
- Newark High School (disambiguation)
- Newark (disambiguation)
