= Metropark station =

NJ Transit and Amtrak station

Metropark
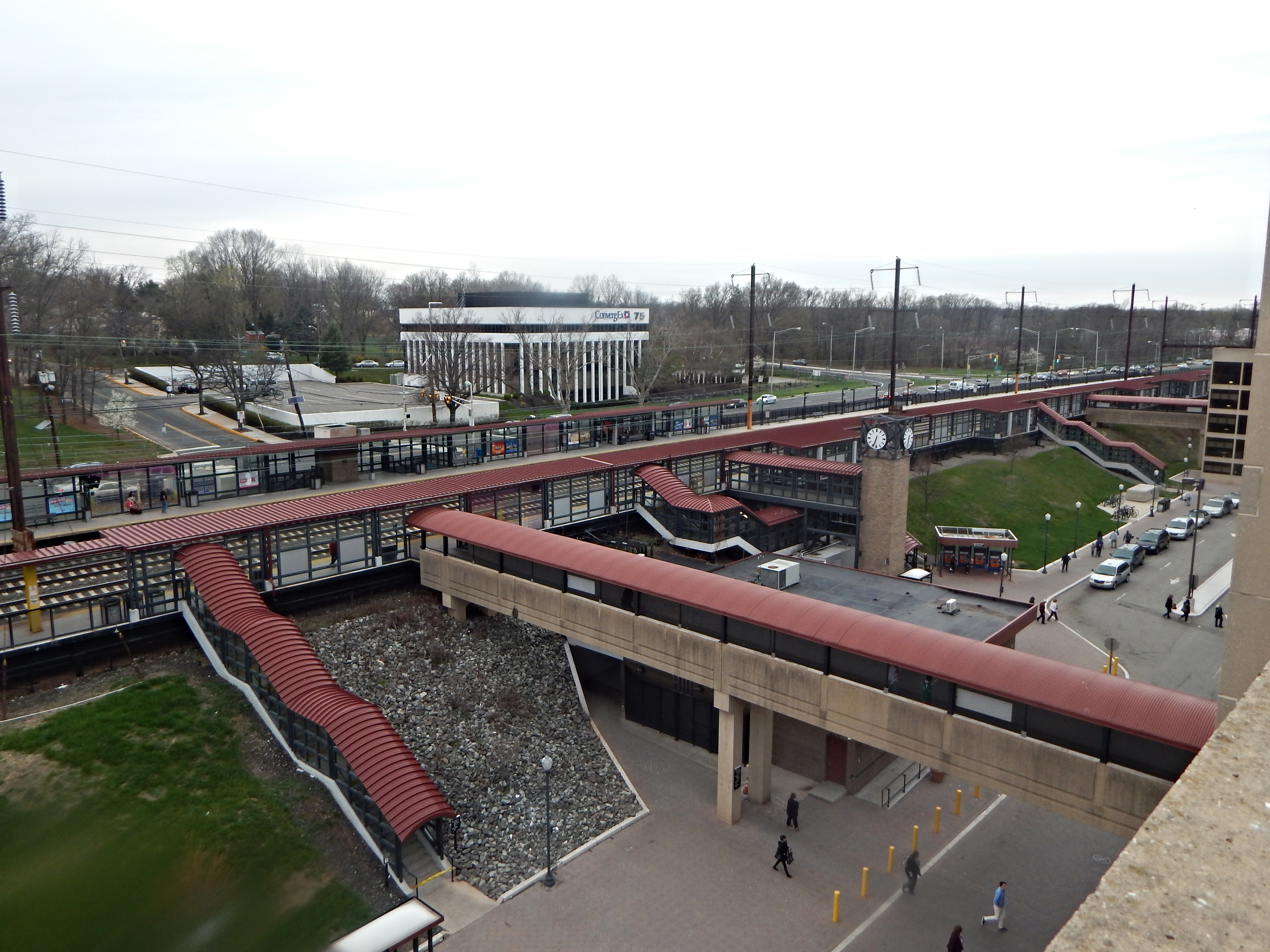
- Metropark station from the parking deck, April 2015

General information
- Location: 100 Middlesex–Essex Turnpike; Iselin, Woodbridge Township, New Jersey; United States
- Coordinates: 40.5681°N 74.3298°W
- Owner: New Jersey Transit
- Line: Amtrak Northeast Corridor
- Platforms: 2 side platforms
- Tracks: 4
- Connections: NJ Transit Bus: 48, 801, 802, 803, 804, 805

Construction
- Parking: 3,615 spaces
- Cycle facilities: Yes
- Accessible: Yes

Other information
- Station code: Amtrak: MET
- IATA code: ZME
- Fare zone: 10 (NJT)

History
- Opened: November 14, 1971
- Rebuilt: 2007–2009 (refurbishment)

Passengers
NJ Transit
- 2025: 3,878 (average weekday)
- Rank: 7 of 153
Amtrak
- FY 2025: 368,392 annually

Services
Preceding station	Amtrak	Following station
Philadelphia toward Washington, D.C.	Acela	Newark Penn toward Boston South
Trenton One-way operation	Crescent	Newark Penn toward New York
Trenton toward Savannah	Palmetto	Newark Penn toward New York
Trenton toward Pittsburgh	Pennsylvanian limited service	Newark Penn One-way operation
New Brunswick toward Harrisburg	Keystone Service limited service	Newark Airport toward New York
New Brunswick toward Norfolk, Newport News or Roanoke	Northeast Regional	Newark Airport toward Boston South or Springfield
Trenton toward Washington, D.C.	Vermonter weekends	Newark Penn toward St. Albans
Cardinal does not stop here
Carolinian does not stop here
Silver Meteor does not stop here
Preceding station	NJ Transit	Following station
Metuchen toward Trenton	Northeast Corridor Line	Rahway toward New York
Former services
Preceding station	Amtrak	Following station
Trenton toward Washington, D.C.	Metroliner Until 2005	Newark Penn toward New York
Location

Metropark station is an intermodal transportation hub in the Iselin section of Woodbridge Township, Middlesex County, New Jersey. Owned and operated by NJ Transit, the station services trains on the agency's Northeast Corridor Line along with several Amtrak services, including the Acela, Crescent, Keystone Service, Northeast Regional, Palmetto, Pennsylvanian, and Vermonter. Several other Amtrak trains bypass the station. NJ Transit also operates five bus routes that loop from Metropark.

The station is near the interchange of Route 27 and Garden State Parkway near exits 131 and 132. and has a multi-story parking facility that is open at all times.

The station, built by the New Jersey Department of Transportation (NJDOT) and the United States Department of Transportation, opened on November 14, 1971, as Garden State Metropark. It was built as a suburban park-and-ride stop for the then-new high-speed rail Metroliners.

== History ==
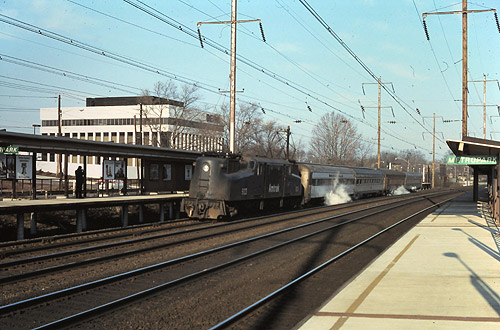
Amtrak train at Metropark, January 1976

Metropark was one of two park-and-ride infill stations proposed in the 1960s for use by the new Metroliners, the other being Capital Beltway in Lanham, Maryland, just outside Washington, D.C. The two stations were originally named Capital Beltway Metropark and Garden State Metropark; these were shortened to Capital Beltway and Metropark. Both were conceived as public-private partnerships. Under a plan put forward in late 1968 by the New Jersey Department of Transportation (NJDOT) the state would contribute $648,000 toward the cost of the station, then estimated at $1.4 million.

Amtrak service to Metropark began on November 14, 1971. The station's cost had increased to $2.6 million, shared by NJDOT and the United States Department of Transportation. It had two 850-foot (260 m) high-level platforms and had 820 parking spaces. It was next to the Garden State Parkway to allow easy access by automobile; a large business park – "the first Edge City in the world to grow from a parking lot" – soon grew near the station. Commuter trains continued to use Iselin station, half a mile east.

=== Renaming controversy ===
In early April 1979, Governor Brendan T. Byrne announced in Newark that he would rename the station in honor of United States Senator Harrison A. Williams Jr., a long-time mass transit advocate for the state. The rename, which would rebrand the stop as the Harrison A. Williams Metropark Station, was an idea of the Governor and supported by officials at the New Jersey Department of Transportation. A spokesperson at the Department of Transportation station stated that they would officially endorse his project on April 10 and plan a ceremony for the renaming. Williams was surprised by Byrne's announcement and was proud of the fact he had helped get some of the funding for the project. Ceremonies were held for the renaming on July 30, with Byrne doing the official dedication himself and praising Senator Williams. Williams spoke at the ceremony, attended by his wife, along with Department of Transportation Commissioner Louis Gambacchini. New signage was also revealed, signifying the new name.

On February 3, 1980, Harrison Williams was arrested in a Federal Bureau of Investigation (FBI) scandal known as Abscam. As part of Abscam, Williams helped get himself 17% of stock in a mine in Piney River, Virginia with a bogus company known as Abdul Enterprises in return for securing contracts from the United States Department of Defense for titanium. The mine, formerly owned by American Cyanamid, had been abandoned since 1971 and Henry Williams III, a former publisher from Paterson, New Jersey, purchased it in 1976. Williams III was on the verge of selling the mine to foreign investors at a cost of $100 million. However, the foreign investors were instead of agents of the FBI, disguised as Arabic sheiks, pretending to be Abdul Enterprises. FBI and United States Department of Justice officials noted that they also had Williams on videotape helping Ritz Associates save $3 million on a new casino in Atlantic City through corrupt measures.

State Senator S. Thomas Gagliano joked with the press on an Amtrak train to Washington D.C. that the newly named Harrison A. Williams Jr. Metropark station should be renamed Abdul Enterprises Station in honor of Williams' arrest and added that it would be considered unwise to name train stations after living people for this reason.

Williams was convicted on May 1, 1981 after 28 hours of deliberation of bribery, conspiracy, conflict of interest, interstate travel in aid of a racketeering enterprise and receiving an unlawful gratuity; he was the final member of the United States Congress to be convicted for his involvement in Abscam. He would resign from Congress on March 11, 1982.

With his conviction and resignation, questions came about his name on Metropark station. NJ Transit stated on March 11 that they had no existing plans to remove Williams' name from the station title. David Crabiel, a Middlesex County freeholder, stated NJ Transit would possibly have to form a committee to decide what to do with the name change. NJ Transit confirmed on March 16 that they had no standing plans to remove Williams' name and it had never come up in any board discussions.

In January 1984, Woodbridge Township Mayor Philip Cerria requested that Williams' name be removed from the station. With all of Williams' appeals exhausted, Cerria felt that leaving the former senator's name on the station would cause a black cloud over the township. Cerria added that the Township Council would vote on a resolution on January 17 to request the removal. Cerria also reached out to new Governor Thomas Kean to have it removed. NJ Transit added that they would still be the ones to make that decision, but that by the time of the resolution, no plans were expected to change the station name. NJ Transit's spokesperson, Richard Mariani, added that despite the conviction, they viewed Williams favorably for his work on mass transit funding. The six members of the Republican Party voted in favor of the removal of his name while the three Democratic Party members opposed the resolution.

While Senator Williams would be released from custody on January 31, 1986, the name would not be removed until the early 1990s.

=== Traffic and parking improvements (1986–1997) ===
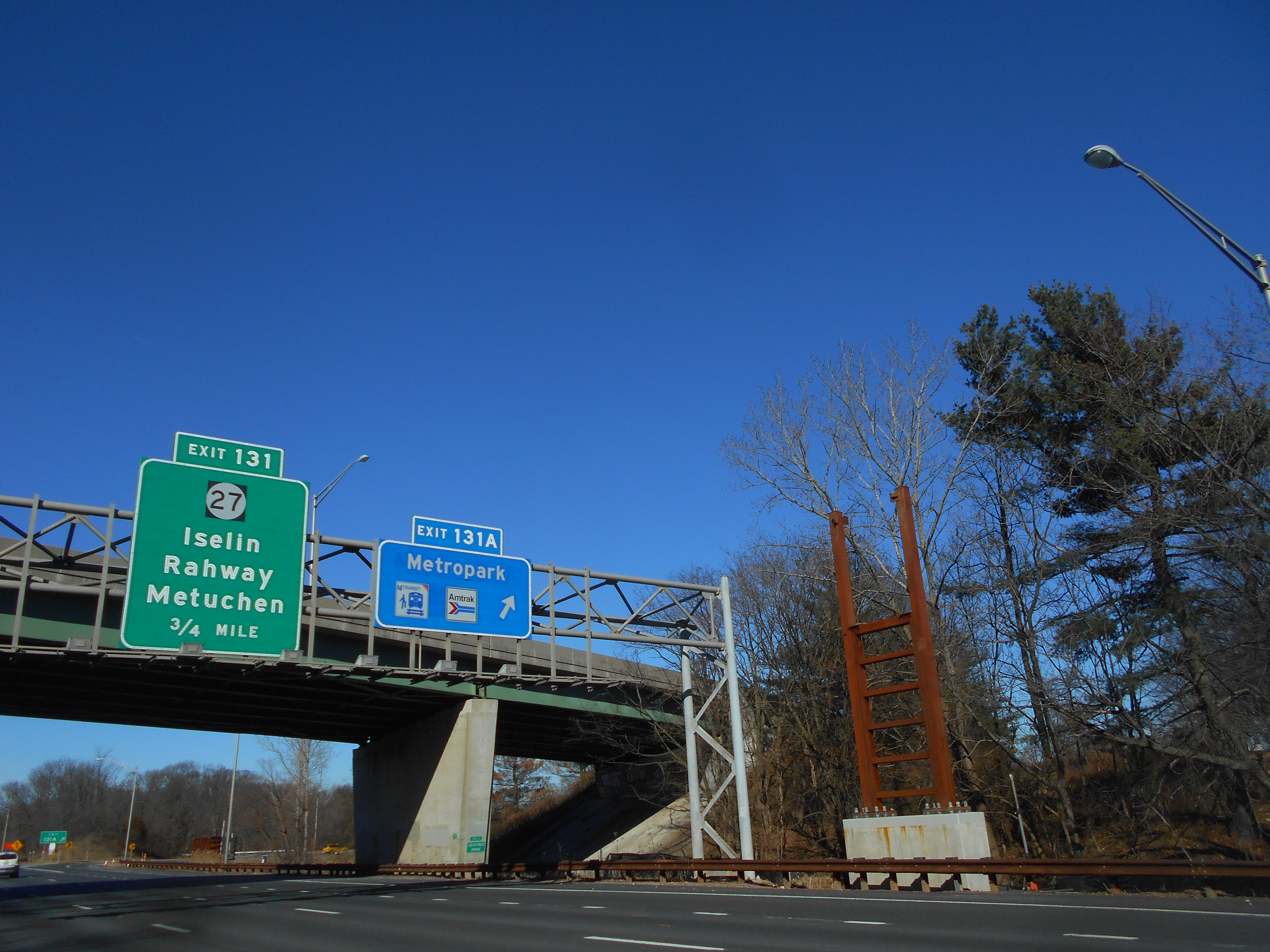
Exit 131A ramp in January 2015, prior to the renumbering of exit 131 as exit 132

As part of improvements for traffic in the area, a new ramp was built on the northbound Garden State Parkway at exit 131A in 1986. Constructed for $4.4 million, 75% of which were from federal funds and 25% from New Jersey's Transportation Trust Fund, the new interchange would allow drivers to avoid traffic at Metropark station but access businesses around the station. Metropark station by 1986 had become the home of a hotel and at least ten major office complexes. Local opposition had been fierce due to belief of even more development coming into the Metropark area, but that occurred anyway without the interchange. Department of Transportation Commissioner Hazel Gluck, Crabiel, and other officials from multiple levels of government opened the new northbound ramp on November 19, 1986. Crabiel told the press that with growing levels of commuter use at the station (3,200 daily), that more improvements in the area would be necessary, including a possible parking deck.

Crabiel and Middlesex County officials met with NJ Transit on September 17, 1987 to discuss the improvement of parking at Metropark station. Middlesex County had maintained the parking lot since March 1980, and noted that the fees at the station covered maintenance and repairs of the lot. Crabiel added that the parking lot at Metropark was in need of resurfacing and that it might be time to consider construction of a parking deck to help move parking. At the time, Metropark station had 1,385 parking permits and access to only 1,216 permit spaces. The rest of the parking at Metropark included a 384 daily parking space lot with fees. There was also a waiting list of 2,500 names of people who wanted parking permits for Metropark, most of which were from Woodbridge Township and Edison Township. Repaving would add only 80 space by eliminating the islands that separated parking spaces.

Middlesex County Planning Director George Ververides added that without a new parking deck, the waiting list would have to be given a different place to park, suggesting a lot proposed for exit 10 of the New Jersey Turnpike, where they would be bussed to Metropark. Crabiel, aware that NJ Transit did not have funds to build such a deck, offered to raise fees to help cover costs of a new structure. He also offered a "free enterprise" proposal where a private developer would build a new office building and a parking deck for use by both private and public entities. Ververides added that improvements were needed in the general area around Metropark, including work at multiple intersections and four railroad overpasses on the Northeast Corridor. NJ Transit officials added that they were aware of the issues at Metropark and would have a study released by November 1987 about what to do with the parking lots.

The study resulted in NJ Transit going ahead with plans to construct a parking deck. Due to lack of funds, they announced in December 1987 that they would be looking for a private developer to help with the construction. They added that a request for proposals would be released in early 1988 and that a new parking deck would open about 1,200 new spaces at Metropark station. Gluck added that this would help with the overcrowding and provide more office space in a rapidly developing area of Middlesex County. NJ Transit added that they would build the parking garage over the existin gparking lot but the new office building would separate (though nearby). Crabiel, happy with the decision to go with a private developer, added that because Metropark's station lot was built with federal funds, the government had to approve the measures before they could talk to private developers, a process that took 18 months.

Two different companies offered proposals to Edison Township in early 1988. J.M. Huber Corp offered in February 1988 a new office building of 183,000 square feet (17,000 m^{2}) wth 85 new parking spaces and a four-story parking deck. The proposal would include an access road between the new building and a building previous built by Huber in the complex. A month later, M. Alfieri Co., a local investing firm, proposed a pair of 24-story office towers, a three-story parking deck and a six-story hotel that would reach into Woodbridge Township. The hotel would have 198 rooms and the parking deck would have 3,000 parking spaces. This was a scaled down version of a 1986 proposal that would have brought 6,000 parking spaces to the area between a 5,000 car garage and a 1,000 car parking lot. The United States Army Corps of Engineers rejected the original design due to the 40 acres (16 ha) of wetlands that would need to be filled for such a project. The new version would only take 8.8 acres (3.6 ha) of wetlands and the developer expected the government would approve it. The Edison Township Planning Board approved the reduced scale project on March 16, 1988.

Middlesex County officials announced in April 1988 that they would add 200 parking spaces to Metropark station to help reduce some parking issues. The plan, which would cost $500,000, would involve removing the islands between parking spaces and making tighter parking spaces in the repaved lot. With a recent fare increase on January 1 requested by NJ Transit, the funding would be paid over a two-year span. NJ Transit added they would be likely to start accepting proposals from developers later in the month for the construction of a new parking deck. Resurfacing of the parking lot began in late July 1988, with T&M Associates of Middletown, New Jersey doing the work. All work would be done only on Sundays and finished by Labor Day to help reduce the strain on parking commuters. NJ Transit delayed the request for proposals to August 1, with plans requested to be returned by September 29. The resurfaced parking lot would result in 182 new parking spaces, but NJ Transit failed to get new proposals by November 1988, stating that they would make another announcement before the end of the year and review proposals during 1989 before naming a developer for the project. NJ Transit also was performing a traffic study in the Metropark area. However, NJ Transit would end up dropping the plan because of concerns about the traffic that would come with the office building attached to the new deck.

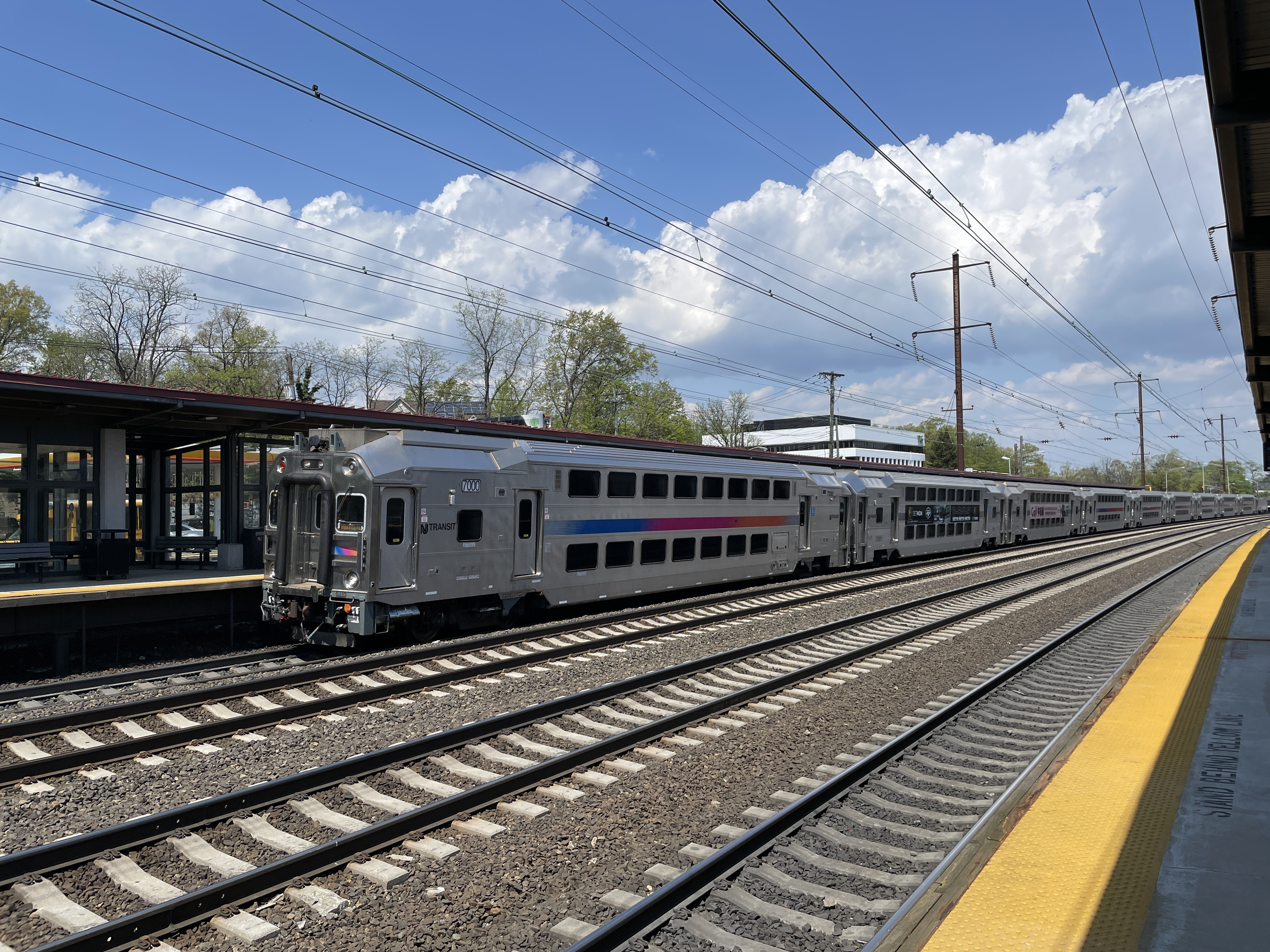
An outbound Northeast Corridor Line train stops at Metropark station

The proposal would not be revived until May 1991, when NJ Transit elevated the parking deck project as a priority for the agency. With traffic continuing to grow at Metropark, NJ Transit decided a different approach was necessary to fund the project. Crabiel stated that the agency told him there were three options: funding from the Port Authority of New York and New Jersey, moving funds around for NJ Transit's capital improvements, or receiving money from Amtrak for a new parking deck. Crabiel speculated that the office building proposal would no longer be considered. NJ Transit did not confirm Crabiel's statement but stated they would be talking with officials before any decisions.

Woodbridge Township officials, including Mayor Joseph DeMarino and the Township Council, opposed construction of the new deck due to the expectation of more traffic on local streets. DeMarino noted that the new deck would exacerbate the traffic and that the Department of Transportation should focus on improvements along the U.S. Route 1 corridor to alleviate congestion in the area instead. This would include a cloverleaf built at Route 1 and the Garden State Parkway and improvement to the junction at Ford Avenue would help. DeMarino added that they should look at finding ways to reduce congestion on Route 27 rather than build the new parking deck. Edison Township officials disagreed with Woodbridge Township, stating that they would rather have the parking deck to reduce the amount of traffic on local streets. However, with NJ Transit operating the property and Middlesex County operating the parking lot, both townships noted that they would not be able to stop any project, despite opposition.

NJ Transit and local officials quietly released proposals for a new deck in August 1992. The new plan would be a parking deck that would bring the capacity to 3,500 people and cost $30 million. The quiet release was considered by Middlesex County officials to stave off opposition until a final proposal was ready. NJ Transit added that the agency had several different decks proposed, but the main one would be a five-story parking deck, with the lowest level underground.

Woodbridge Economic Development Corporation (WEDCO) did their own traffic study around Metropark in early 1993, producing a 32-page report that noted that improvements to local roads would be required as part of construction of the new parking deck. WEDCO officials added that the traffic would get worse in the area even if the parking deck was not built and that the occupancy rate for offices in the area would grow from 75% to 90% by 1998. The study noted that the traffic on roads around Metropark would decrease with the new parking deck as a lot of commuters would go from being dropped off by others to parking in the deck on their own, reducing standing traffic. NJ Transit added that they were working with Woodbridge and Edison officials to create a traffic plan for the new parking deck. WEDCO offered several solutions to mitigate traffic, including adding a right turn lane at the junction of Middlesex–Essex Turnpike and Gill Lane; replacing the stripes at exit 131B, adding traffic signals on Middlesex–Essex Turnpike and outlawing parking to allow an extra lane in each direction. The junction of Green Street and Middlesex–Essex Turnpike would be improved, a widening of the junction of Thornall Street and Evergreen Road and at Wood Avenue and Route 27. The final solution would be to improve several intersections on Route 27 in Iselin and Menlo Park.

NJ Transit officially approved the construction of a new parking deck at Metropark station on November 16, 1993. A new $32 million project would result in the construction of two new parking decks that would be interconnected. The surface lot of 1,791 spaces would be eliminated in its entirety for the two structures: a four-story deck for 1,500 vehicles and a six-story deck for 2,000 more vehicles. NJ Transit officials stated that the new parking decks would take 2.5–3 years to be built and opened and that 800 people would be displaced during construction of the first parking deck. With that expectation, NJ Transit offered it would rent space with office buildings to open more parking on a temporary basis. With construction expected to start in the summer of 1994, NJ Transit would make its final selection on a bidder for the project by the end of 1993.

$12.5 million of the project would be funded from revenue bonds and parking fees attached to the deck would pay off the bonds and operate the new structures. As part of construction, the fee would be raised from its current level to help facilitate payment of the bonds. Amtrak would also kick in $5.5 million with the caveat that spaces in the deck would be set aside for overnight Amtrak riders. NJ Transit would pay for the rest of the project with the exception of the road improvements, which would be paid by the New Jersey Department of Transportation. $4 million would be spent to improve 11 intersections in Woodbridge and Edison for the expected traffic based on WEDCO's suggestions. Woodbridge Mayor Jim McGreevey asked that NJ Transit ensure that the traffic work was done first before the parking deck construction began. However, after a meeting between NJ Transit officials, McGreevey, Assemblymen Stephen Mikulak (R-Middlesex County) and Ernest Oros (R-Middlesex County) at Oros' office on December 3, 1993, NJ Transit agreed to postpone the contract awards until money was found by the State Legislature to improve traffic. Oros, McGreevey and Mikulak agreed they would ask officials from the county, Department of Transportation, New Jersey Highway Authority and incoming Governor Christine Todd Whitman to fund the traffic improvements.

Amtrak signed off on the $5.5 million to pay NJ Transit on May 25, 1994.

Delays of the project continued on multiple occasions, including in September 1994, where they postponed it for work on the design of the new structure to alleviate local concerns about the traffic.

After failing to get NJ Transit to change their mind, McGreevey and Edison Mayor George Spadoro both made an effort to reach out to Whitman in March 1995 to prevent construction of the parking decks. Feeling that the agency had ignored their requests about the construction plans, the two opposed the construction until they got the intersection improvements they wanted done first. They wanted the Senate and Assembly to hold hearings to make a decision before construction would begin on any section. Construction began on March 27, 1995 of the 1,500-space parking deck, resulting in little gridlock compared to what was expected by skeptics of the project. After not getting an injunction from Whitman, McGreevey and Spadoro went ahead and worked on an agreement in April 1995 to pave Wood Avenue from Route 27 to Oak Tree Road, a project that would cost $70,000. Woodbridge would pay for the 1400 tons of asphalt and Edison would provide the labor.

By October 1995, the majority of the 1,500 car parking deck was complete, with NJ Transit leading a tour of the structure. Oros offered the tour to skeptical Woodbridge Township residents and McGreevey, who reiterated that the work NJ Transit did not agree to should have been done first. Later that month, the NJ Transit Board of Directors approved Parkway Corporation of Philadelphia, Pennsylvania to operate the parking lot through 1998 with an extension to 2000. The 1,500-space parking deck opened on February 5, 1996 with no gridlock of traffic in the area. The 2,000-space second parking garage opened on March 3, 1997.

=== Renovations (2006–2009) ===
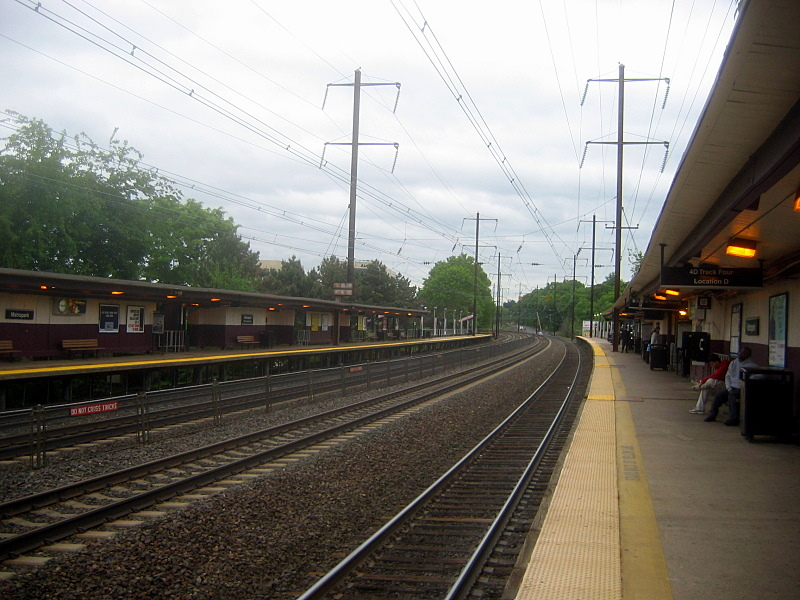
Metropark station in May 2005, prior to renovations

On December 13, 2006, NJ Transit's Board of Directors voted to approve reconstruction of Metropark station at a cost of $49 million, letting a contract out to Anslmi & DeCicco of Maplewood, New Jersey. $29 million of that cost would build new platforms that were longer and wider than the predecessor structures, and refurbish the waiting room, adding longer canopies and shelters. The pedestrian tunnel would be renovated, new staircases, communication systems, signs and lights would also be installed. The new platforms were 1,050-foot (320 m) long for the eastbound platform and 1,135-foot (346 m) long on the westbound platform. The other $20 million would go towards new connections towards Route 27 to the westbound platform. The agency slated for construction to begin in early 2007 with completion in 2010.

The groundbreaking occurred on April 23, 2007, with Transportation Commissioner Kris Kolluri and NJ Transit Executive Director Richard Sarles on hand to launch the ceremony. The organization announced that the now $47 million station construction would be done in multiple phases to reduce the impact on the commuters (averaging 15,200 between NJ Transit and Amtrak on a daily basis.) During construction, murals made by Mary Angers, a local artist, were retained by NJ Transit for display in the new station. Construction was finished ahead of schedule in the summer of 2009.

== Layout and services ==
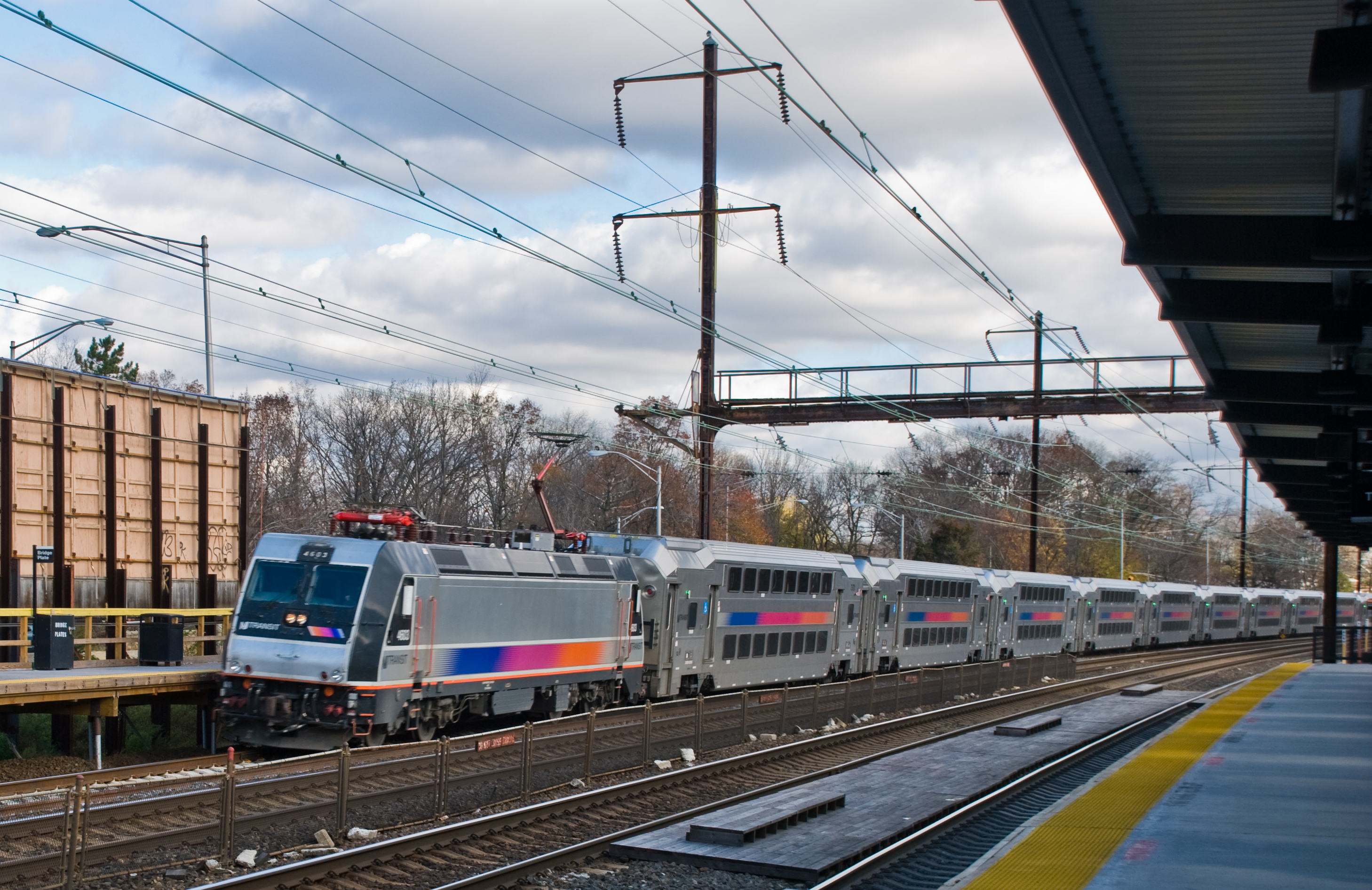
An NJ Transit train at Metropark

The station is served by NJ Transit Rail Operations Northeast Corridor Line. The station has two high-level side platforms flanking the four tracks of the Northeast Corridor. Amtrak's long-haul services and most Keystone Service trains that utilize the Northeast Corridor bypass the station via the inner tracks, as do some NJ Transit express trains. Until 2005, the eastbound Pennsylvanian also stopped at Metropark. Amtrak trains skip most other stations between Trenton and Newark Penn Station, but many trains stop at Metropark despite having to switch to the outside (local) tracks to do so. Pairs of 45-mph crossovers (interlockings MENLO and ISELIN) just east and west of the station were added about 1986 to make this easier.

NJ Transit operates five rush hour bus routes, known as the "Metropark Loops": the 801, which runs via JFK Medical Center in Edison; the 802, which runs via Iselin; the 803, which runs to Woodbridge Center Mall; the 804, which serves Colonia; and the 805, which loops through Fords. The NJ Transit 48 bus between Elizabeth and Perth Amboy also operates via Metropark all day weekdays and weekends.
