= Newark Township =

Newark Township may refer to:

- Newark Township, Webster County, Iowa
- Newark Township, Wilson County, Kansas
- Newark Township, Michigan
- Newark Township, Kearney County, Nebraska
- Newark Township, New Jersey, now the city of Newark
- Newark Township, Licking County, Ohio
- Newark Township, Marshall County, South Dakota, in Marshall County, South Dakota
