= USS Newark (SP-266) =

Minesweeper of the United States Navy

History

United States
- Name: USS Newark
- Namesake: Newark, New Jersey; Newark, Delaware; Newark, New York; and Newark, Ohio (previous name retained)
- Builder: Skinner Shipbuilding Company, Baltimore, Maryland
- Completed: 1913
- Acquired: 18 August 1917
- Commissioned: 23 September 1917
- Decommissioned: 15 May 1919
- Fate: Sold 19 May 1919
- Notes: Operated as civilian tug Newark 1913-1917

General characteristics
- Type: Minesweeper and tug
- Displacement: 231 long tons (235 t)
- Length: 107 ft (33 m)
- Beam: 26 ft (7.9 m)
- Draft: 11 ft 6 in (3.51 m)
- Speed: 14 kn (16 mph; 26 km/h)
- Armament: 1 × 1-pounder gun

The second USS Newark (SP-266) was a United States Navy minesweeper and tug in commission from 1917 to 1919.

Newark was built as a commercial tug of the same name in 1913 by the Skinner Shipbuilding Company at Baltimore, Maryland. The U.S. Navy acquired her from her owner, the Delaware, Lackawanna and Western Railroad Company, on 18 August 1917 for World War I service as a minesweeper and tug. She was commissioned on 23 September 1917 as USS Newark (SP-266).

Operating in the 3rd Naval District (headquartered at New York City) during World War I, Newark got under way on 26 September 1917 as a minesweeper in and around New York City, berthing at Marine Basin. She steamed on patrol to Whitestone, Long Island, New York on 4 January 1918. In February, she operated as a tug, breaking ice in Marine Basin, helping six submarine chasers out of the harbor, and towing ships from docks to coal barges. In May, she resumed minesweeping activities, operating in Ambrose Channel.

After the war, on 22 January 1919, Newark steamed up to Fort Lafayette in New York Harbor, towing barges and ships such as Lowell to the Lackawanna Terminal coal docks in Hoboken, New Jersey.

Newark was decommissioned on 15 May and was sold on 19 May.
