= Newark Valley =

Newark Valley may refer to:

- Newark Valley, New York, United States, a town
  - Newark Valley (village), New York, a village within the town
- Newark Valley (Nevada), United States
- "Newark Valley", a 2004 song by Gary Wilson
