= AirTrain Newark =

Monorail system at Newark Liberty International Airport

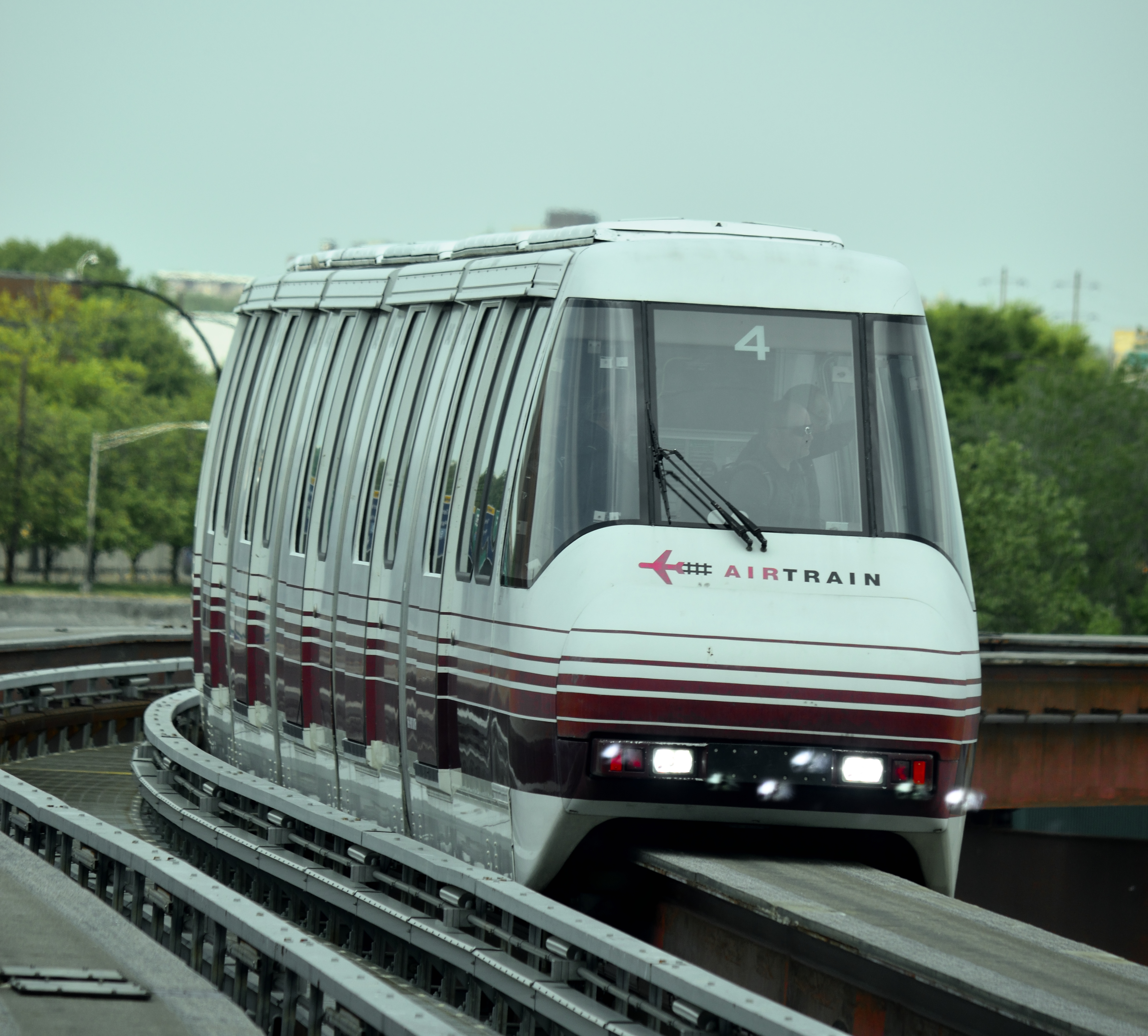
- AirTrain Newark in 2023

Overview
- Status: Operating
- Owner: Port Authority of New York and New Jersey
- Locale: Newark Liberty International Airport, Newark & Elizabeth, New Jersey
- Termini: Terminal A; Newark Liberty International Airport station
- Stations: 6 (formerly 8)

Service
- Type: People mover, monorail
- Operator: Alstom
- Rolling stock: 18 x Von Roll Mk III

History
- Opened: May 31, 1996; 30 years ago
- Last extension: October 21, 2001 (to RailLink station)

Technical
- Track length: 3 miles (4.8 km)
- Character: Elevated
- Electrification: Dual third rails
- Operating speed: 20 mph (32 km/h)

AirTrain Newark is a 3-mile (4.8 km) monorail people mover system connecting the terminals at Newark Liberty International Airport (EWR) and the Newark Liberty International Airport Station on the Northeast Corridor (NEC), where transfers are made to Amtrak and NJ Transit's Northeast Corridor Line and North Jersey Coast Line. The monorail opened in 1996, and is planned to be replaced by a Cable Liner system by 2030.

== History ==
=== Planning and initial operations ===
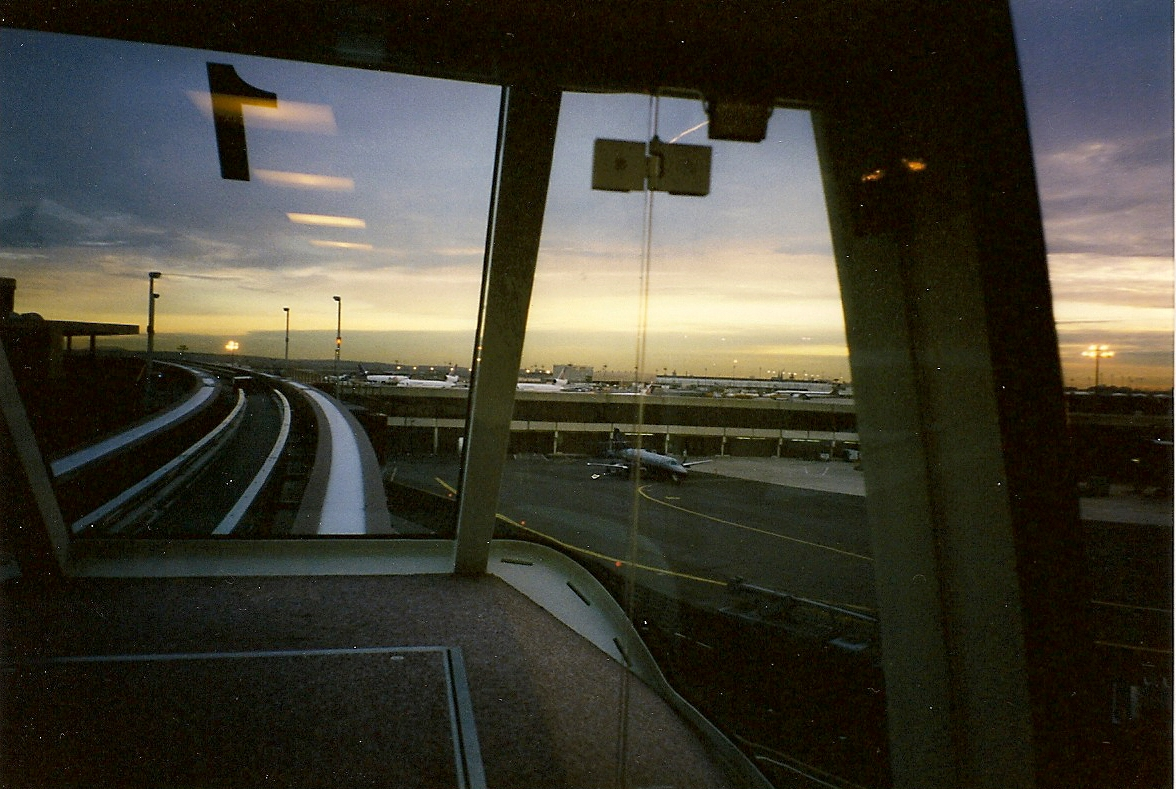
View from the front car of a train in 1997

In 1991, ground was broken for AirTrain Newark's construction. A monorail had been proposed in order to alleviate vehicular traffic at the terminals. Originally projected to open in 1994, the completion date was pushed back due to a change in project management and issues related to the system's switches.

The $354 million monorail eventually opened on May 31, 1996. It initially served only as an airport circulator, a service which allows passengers to transfer between airport terminals or concourses. Service was phased in, with trains operating from 5 am to 11 pm for the first 60 days of the monorail's operations, after which time it would operate at all times, starting early that August. The monorail tracks were soon thereafter extended to the Northeast Corridor, with construction on that project beginning in 1997; the extension opened on October 21, 2001.

When the system first opened in 1996, a fleet of 12 six-car trains ran on the network. The fleet was later expanded to 18 six-car trains.

In September 2000, the monorail temporarily shut down after defects were detected in the system's de-icing mechanisms. Originally anticipated to last for three months, the shutdown & repairs lasted for six months, and the monorail resumed operations on the morning of March 10, 2001. Adtranz was responsible for paying the $25 million in repairs, and temporary shuttle buses provided service in lieu of the monorail during the shutdown period.

The contract to build the system was awarded to Von Roll, but the project was finished by Adtranz, which acquired Von Roll's monorail division while the system was being built. Adtranz was later acquired by Bombardier Transportation, which was itself purchased by Alstom, which continues to operate the AirTrain under contract to the Port Authority of New York and New Jersey – the operator of the airport.

AirTrain service was suspended from May 1, 2014, for 75 days, until mid-July, to allow for repairs to be made. Repairs were completed early, and the system resumed operations on July 3.

=== Replacement ===
The system has a projected lifespan of 25 years. In April 2015, the PANYNJ suggested that initial work to replace the system would cost $40 million in consultant and engineering studies. In 2017, the Port Authority decided to include the then $1.7 billion PATH extension to the Newark Liberty International Airport "RailLink" station in their 2017 10-year capital plan, while the AirTrain was given $300 million for maintenance and repairs.

However, in January 2019, New Jersey Governor Phil Murphy announced a plan for a $2 billion replacement project for the AirTrain. Murphy has stated that replacement is necessary because the system is reaching the end of its projected 25-year life and is subject to persistent delays and breakdowns. The Port Authority would be responsible for funding the project. In October 2019, the Port Authority's Board of Commissioners approved the AirTrain Newark Replacement Project, with an estimated cost of $2.05 billion. Construction was expected to start in 2021 and be completed in 2024. A draft environmental impact statement was completed in February 2021 when the proposed opening date was shifted to 2026. Federal environmental approval for the project was received later that year.

In December 2023, the Port Authority announced that Doppelmayr will manufacture the replacement system, awarding them the contract in the first phase of the project's contract procurement process. The new system will use automated, cable-driven trains, and many portions of the route will travel along new alignments; the new system will be in 2.5 miles (4.0 km) in length and have four stations. Tutor Perini received a $1.2 billion contract in November 2024 to construct the new system's stations and elevated tracks, at which point the system's cost had increased to $3.5 billion and the opening date shifted further to 2030. Parsons Corporation was hired the next month to design the stations and guideway. Work on the AirTrain Newark replacement commenced October 7, 2025. Because it wished to prioritize the AirTrain replacement, the PANYNJ deferred an extension of the PATH's Newark–World Trade Center line to Newark Airport by ten years.

Starting January 15, 2026, the AirTrain is suspended on weekdays between 5:00 AM until 3:00 PM to allow construction on the replacement project, with a brief temporary reopening of service on May 22. Additional suspensions are also planned from September 30 until October 30 of the same year, and for October 30, 2026 lasting until January 15, 2027. Throughout each of the shutdowns, AirTrain service will be replaced by temporary free shuttle buses, where it will feature a temporary additional stop at the rental car facility outside of Terminal A. On January 15, 2026, AirTrain service was truncated back to P4, its former terminus, where riders are currently required to use replacement shuttle buses for service to and from the RailLink station.

== Fare ==
The AirTrain is fare-free, except for passengers traveling to and from the RailLink station to connect with NJ Transit or Amtrak; passengers are required to pay an $8.75 "AirTrain access fee" at that station. When passengers purchase a rail ticket to or from the station, the fee is automatically added to the ticket price and a barcode is printed on the ticket that is used to pass through the fare gate array between the AirTrain platform and the train platform. Passengers using passes to another station and those who pay a cash fare on board the train must purchase a separate AirTrain ticket from machines located on either side of the fare gates. Child tickets (ages 5 to 11) are exempt from this additional fare.

The access fee has been raised several times since the system was built, with the last increase to $8.75 going into effect on March 4, 2026.

== Stations ==
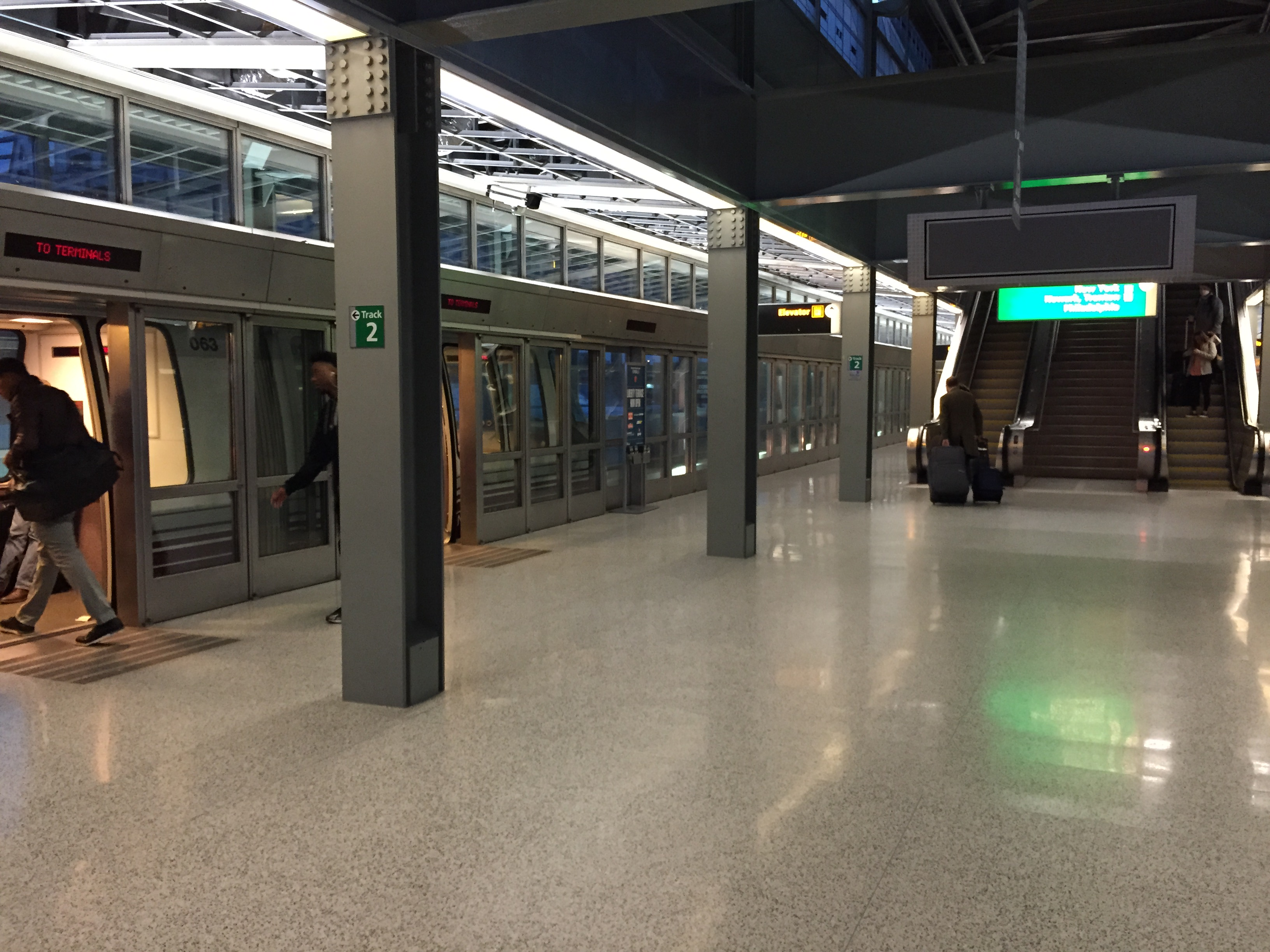
Newark Liberty International Airport Station (RailLink station, Amtrak/NJ Transit trains)

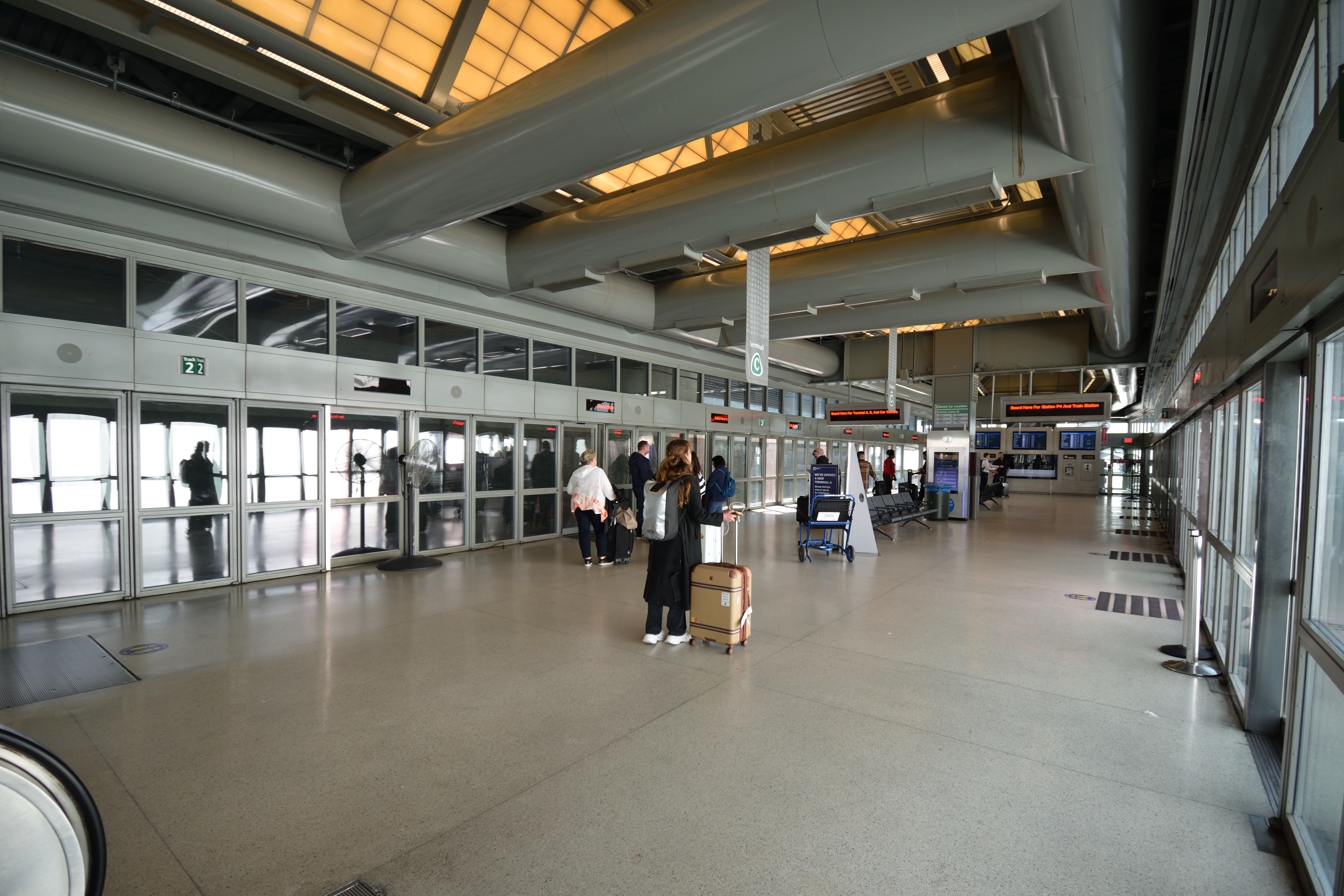
Terminal C station

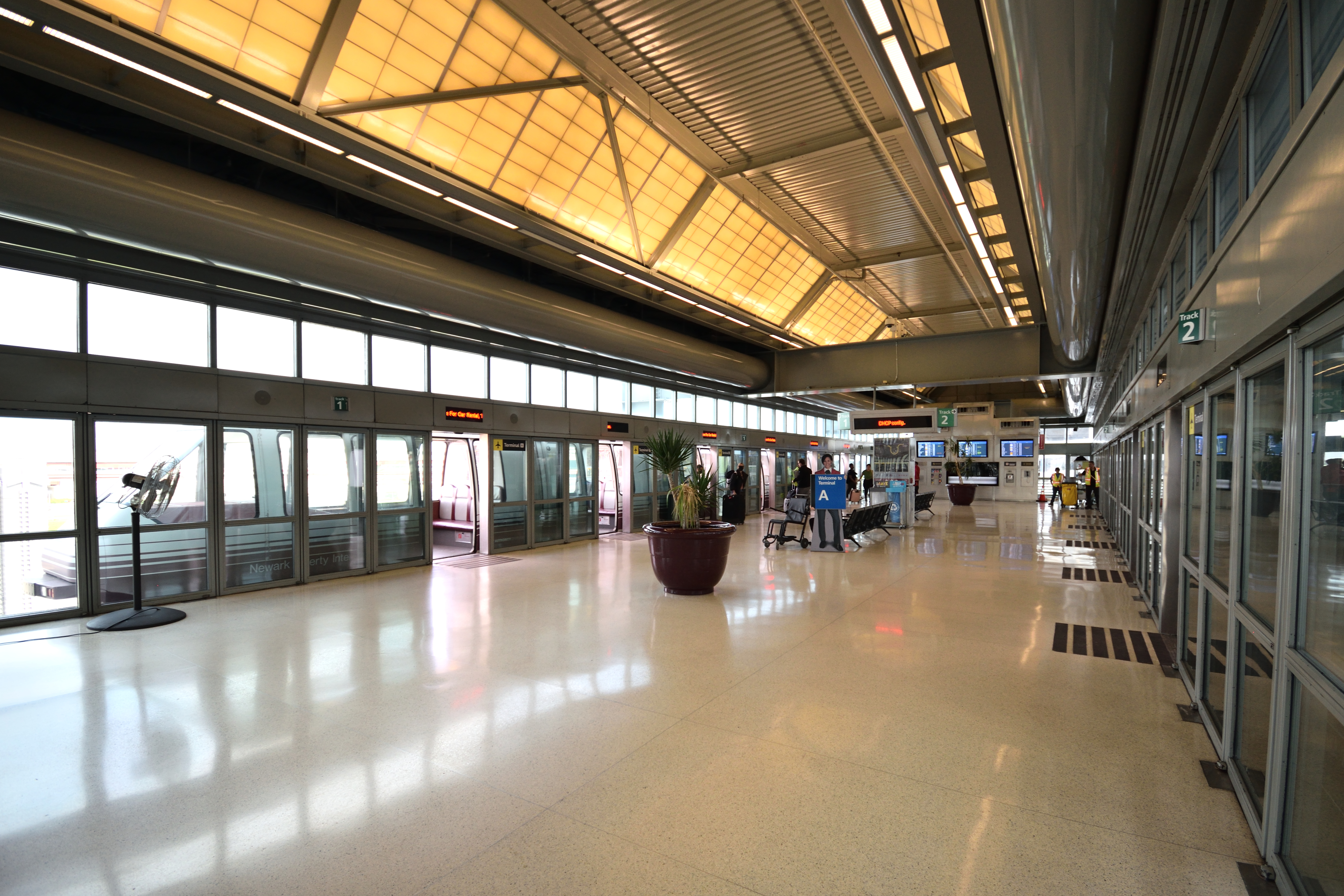
Terminal A (formerly P2; reopened January 2023)

The AirTrain has three major stations within the airport: one for each terminal (A, B, and C). Two stations – Terminal B and Terminal C – sit on top of their respective terminal buildings. There are two other stations (P3 and P4) for the parking lots and rental car facilities, plus a sixth (the RailLink station) at the Northeast Corridor. The system previously included two other stations: P1 and P2 – but the P1 station was removed in July 2019 to permit construction of a new consolidated rental car and parking facility, and P2 closed in June 2021 in connection with the same project. However, the P2 station was reopened as the new Terminal A station in conjunction with the new Terminal A in January 2023. The original Terminal A station was initially used as an "employees only" stop, but as a result of the terminal's replacement, the "employees only" stop was relocated to the dormant P3 station. The P3 station reopened to passengers in January 2026 to provide a temporary shuttle pickup area for service to parking facilities, rental cars, and hotels during the replacement project.

All stations are compliant with the Americans with Disabilities Act of 1990.

In 2007, the average daily paid ridership was 4,930.

Station	Connections	Notes
RailLink	Amtrak: Northeast Regional, Keystone Service; NJ Transit: Northeast Corridor Line, North Jersey Coast Line; Shuttle bus to P4, Terminal A, and rental car facility - 5:00 AM to 3:00 PM on weekdays	Opened on October 21, 2001; AirTrain replaced by shuttle buses until May 22, 2026
P4	P4 parking garage – daily parking; Shuttle bus to the RailLink station - 5:00 AM to 3:00 PM on weekdays	Original terminus prior to the system's extension to the RailLink station ; terminus reinstated during AirTrain replacement project; Shuttles to airport hotels, off-airport rental cars, and off-airport parking facilities originally served this station but have relocated to P3 to accommodate construction of the AirTrain replacement project.
Terminal C	Terminal C; Short-term Parking C	AirTrain service planned to be replaced by shuttle buses during shutdowns amid replacement project.; Terminal B planned to be replaced.
Terminal B	Terminal B; Short-term Parking B	AirTrain service planned to be replaced by shuttle buses during shutdowns amid replacement project.; Terminal B planned to be replaced.
P3	Airport hotel shuttles; Off-airport rental car shuttles; Shuttles to off-airport parking facilities	Former consolidated rental car facility; Formerly provided daily parking facility; Closed to passengers in 2023; later reopened in January 2026 to temporarily accommodate shuttles during the AirTrain replacement project.; Terminus during AirTrain shutdowns
Terminal A	Terminal A; Short-term Parking A; Consolidated rental car facility	Formerly P2, which originally closed in 2021.; Later reopened as Terminal A in January 2023; Shuttle bus required for access between the AirTrain station and terminal; Replaced by shuttle buses during AirTrain shutdowns amid replacement project; additional stop also added at the rental car facility

=== Former stations ===
Station	Opened	Closed	Notes
P1	May 31, 1996	May 2019	Daily parking facility
Terminal A	May 31, 1996	January 2023	Under demolition as of 2024; Replaced by new Terminal A in 2023

== Rolling stock ==
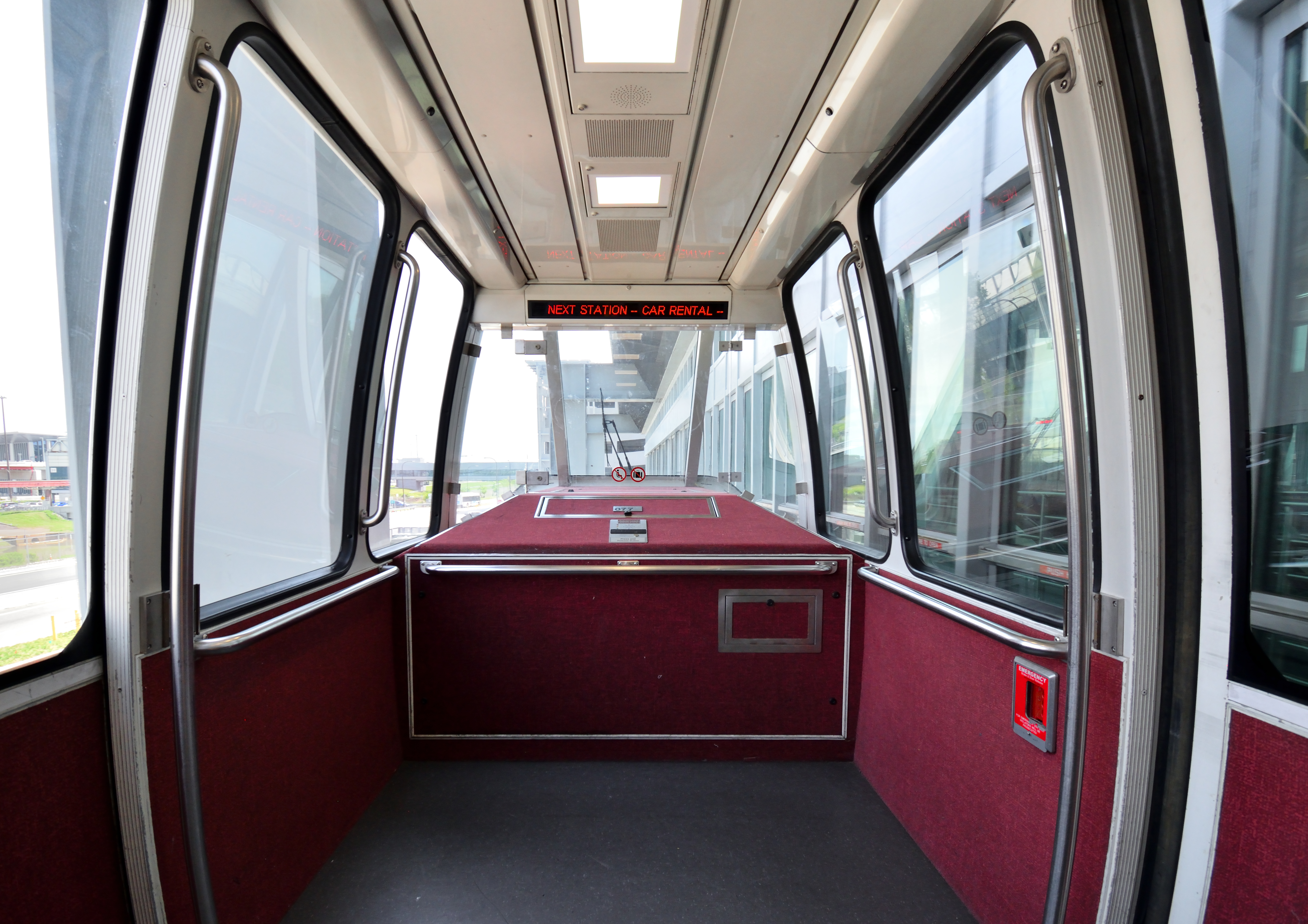
The interior of an AirTrain Newark monorail car in 2023

AirTrain Newark operates using 18 Von Roll Mk III trainsets, each train consisting of 6 cars. Each set travels up to 20 miles per hour (32 km/h) along the line. The fleet originally consisted of 12 six-car trains, but an additional six trainsets – also six cars in length – were eventually added, bringing the total number of trainsets to 18. Pre-recorded announcements onboard the trains announce the stations and the airlines and connections available at the given station – in addition to various other messages; the announcements are recorded by former traffic reporter Bernie Wagenblast.

Upon the completion of the replacement AirTrain Newark system in 2030, the current Von Roll Mk III monorail trainsets will be retired and replaced by cable-driven trainsets manufactured by Doppelmayr.

== See also ==
- List of rapid transit systems
- List of airport people mover systems
- Airport rail link
- AirTrain JFK
- AirTrain LaGuardia, a proposed but later cancelled project
- AirTrain SFO, at San Francisco International Airport
