= Newark Castle =

Newark Castle may refer to:

- Newark Castle, Fife, Scotland
- Newark Castle, Nottinghamshire, England
  - Newark Castle railway station, Nottinghamshire
- Newark Castle, Port Glasgow, Inverclyde, Scotland
- Newark Castle, Selkirkshire, Scotland
