= Newark Penn Station =

Transportation center in Newark, New Jersey

Newark Penn
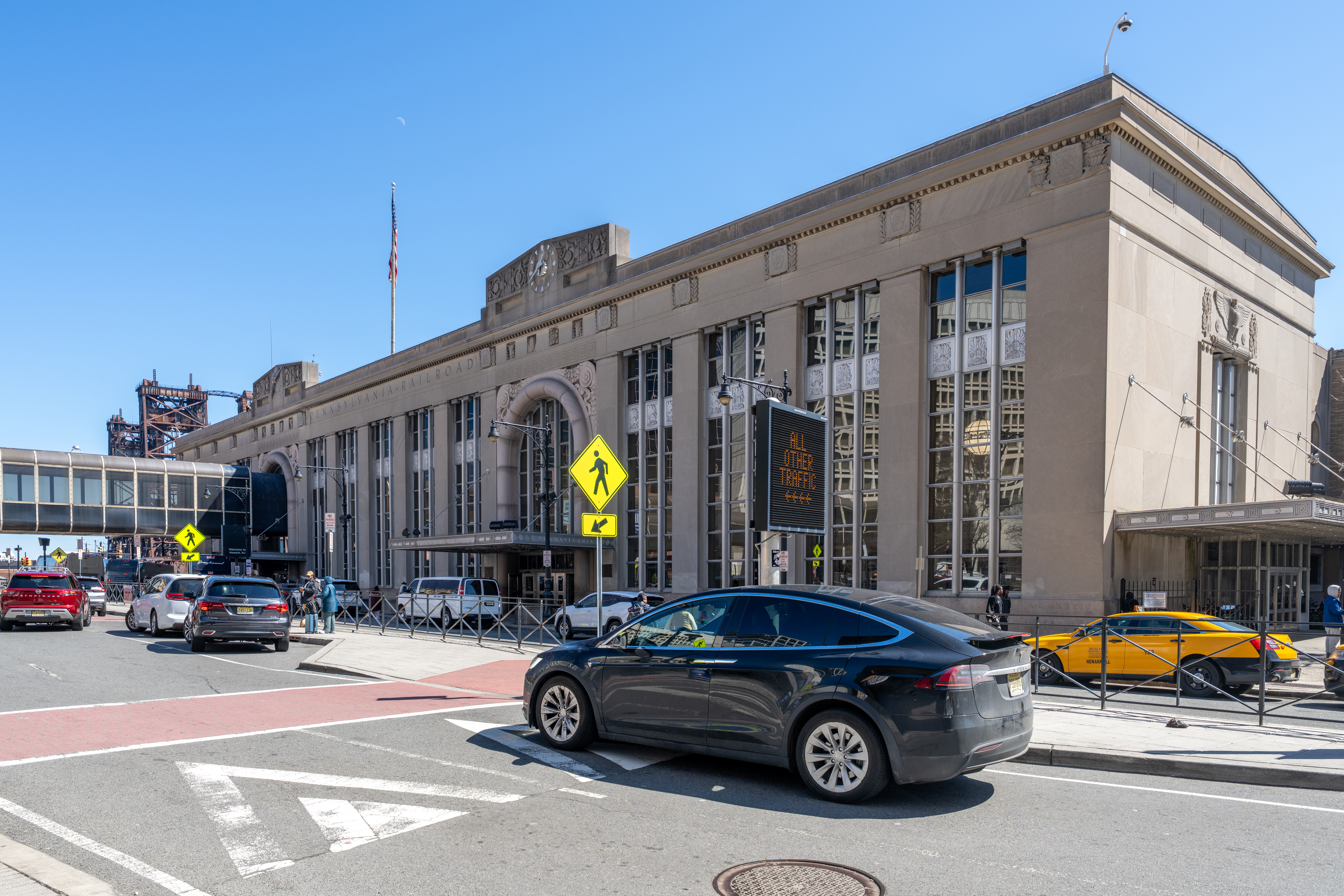
- Penn Station's main entrance in 2026

General information
- Other names: Newark (PATH)
- Location: 1 Raymond Plaza West; Newark, New Jersey; United States
- Owner: NJ Transit
- Line: Amtrak Northeast Corridor
- Distance: 10.0 miles (16.1 km) from New York Penn Station
- Platforms: Upper level: 1 side platform; Main level: 3 island platforms, 2 side platforms; Lower level: 2 island platforms, 3 side platforms
- Tracks: 6 (Northeast Corridor), 2 (PATH), 5 (Newark Light Rail)
- Train operators: Amtrak, NJ Transit, Newark Light Rail, PATH
- Bus stands: 12
- Connections: NJ Transit Bus: 1, 5, 11, 21, 25, GO25, 28, 29, 30, 31, 34, 39, 40, 41, 44, 62, 65, 66, 67, 70, 71, 72, 73, 76, 78, 79, 108, 319, 361, 375, 378; Greyhound Lines; FlixBus; Fullington Trailways; Rutgers University Shuttle

Construction
- Parking: Paid parking nearby
- Cycle facilities: No
- Accessible: Yes

Other information
- Station code: Amtrak: NWK
- IATA code: ZRP
- Fare zone: 1 (NJT)

History
- Opened: March 24, 1935
- Rebuilt: 2007

Passengers
Amtrak
- FY 2025: 884,002 annually
NJ Transit Rail Operations
- 2025: 15,205 (average weekday)
- Rank: 2 of 153
Newark Light Rail
- 2025: 5,172 (average weekday)
- Rank: 1 of 17
PATH
- 2025: 5,372,919 annually ▲7.9%
- Rank: 5 of 13
Services
Preceding station	Amtrak	Following station
Metropark toward Washington, D.C.	Acela	New York toward Boston South
Trenton toward Chicago	Cardinal	New York Terminus
Trenton toward Charlotte	Carolinian	New York Terminus
Metropark One-way operation	Crescent	New York Terminus
Trenton toward New Orleans	Crescent	New York Terminus
Newark Airport toward Harrisburg	Keystone Service	New York Terminus
Metropark toward Savannah	Palmetto	New York Terminus
Metropark toward Pittsburgh	Pennsylvanian	New York Terminus
Trenton toward Miami	Silver Meteor	New York Terminus
Newark Airport toward Norfolk, Newport News or Roanoke	Northeast Regional	New York toward Boston South or Springfield
Metropark weekends toward Washington, D.C.	Vermonter	New York toward St. Albans
Preceding station	NJ Transit	Following station
NJ Transit Rail Operations
Newark Airport toward Trenton	Northeast Corridor Line	Secaucus Junction toward New York
Newark Airport toward Bay Head	North Jersey Coast Line	Secaucus Junction toward New York
Union toward High Bridge	Raritan Valley Line	Secaucus Junction limited service toward New York
Newark Light Rail
NJPAC/Center Street toward Broad Street	Broad Street – Newark Penn	Terminus
Military Park toward Grove Street	Grove Street – Newark Penn	Terminus
Preceding station	PATH	Following station
Terminus	NWK–WTC	Harrison toward World Trade Center
Former services
Preceding station	Amtrak	Following station
Trenton toward Washington, D.C.	Metroliner	New York Terminus
Metropark Until 2005 toward Washington, D.C.	Metroliner	New York Terminus
Trenton toward Chicago	Three Rivers 1995–2005	New York Terminus
Trenton toward Chicago	Broadway Limited Until 1995	New York Terminus
Trenton toward Kansas City	National Limited	New York Terminus
Trenton toward Washington, D.C.	Montrealer	New York toward Montreal
Trenton toward Miami	Silver Star 1971–2024	New York Terminus
Preceding station	NJ Transit	Following station
Atlantic City Terminus	ACES 2009–2011	New York Terminus
Preceding station	Conrail	Following station
Bound Brook toward Reading Terminal	Crusader and Wall Street 1976–1981	Terminus
Bound Brook toward West Trenton	West Trenton Line 1981–1982 (NJ Transit)	Terminus
Preceding station	Pennsylvania Railroad	Following station
Newark South Street toward Chicago	Main Line (Note: Manhattan Transfer was closed 1937; next station post-1937 is New York (replaced with the current New York Penn Station in 1968) or Exchange Place (closed in 1961))	Manhattan Transfer toward New York or Exchange Place
Newark South Street toward New Brunswick	New Brunswick Line	Manhattan Transfer toward New York or Exchange Place
Preceding station	Lehigh Valley Railroad	Following station
Townley toward Buffalo	Main Line	Manhattan Transfer toward New York
Meeker Avenue toward Buffalo	Main Line	Manhattan Transfer toward New York
Preceding station	Central Railroad of New Jersey	Following station
Roselle Park toward Scranton	Main Line After 1967	Terminus
- Pennsylvania Station
- U.S. National Register of Historic Places
- Interactive map of Pennsylvania Station
- Coordinates: 40°44′5″N 74°9′51″W
- Area: 5 acres (2 ha)
- Built: 1935
- Architect: McKim, Mead & White
- Architectural style: Classical Revival, Art Deco
- NRHP reference No.: 78001760
- Added to NRHP: December 20, 1978
Location

Newark Penn Station is an intermodal passenger station in Newark, New Jersey. One of the New York metropolitan area's major transportation hubs, Newark Penn Station is served by multiple rail and bus carriers, making it the ninth busiest rail station in the United States, and the fourth busiest in the New York City metropolitan area.

Located at Raymond Plaza between Market Street and Raymond Boulevard, the station is served by three NJ Transit commuter rail lines, the Newark Light Rail, the PATH rapid transit system, and all 10 of Amtrak's Northeast Corridor services, including the Acela. The station is also Newark's main intercity bus terminal; it is served by carriers Greyhound, Bolt, and Fullington Trailways. Additionally, it is served by 33 local and regional bus lines operated by NJ Transit Bus Operations.

== History ==
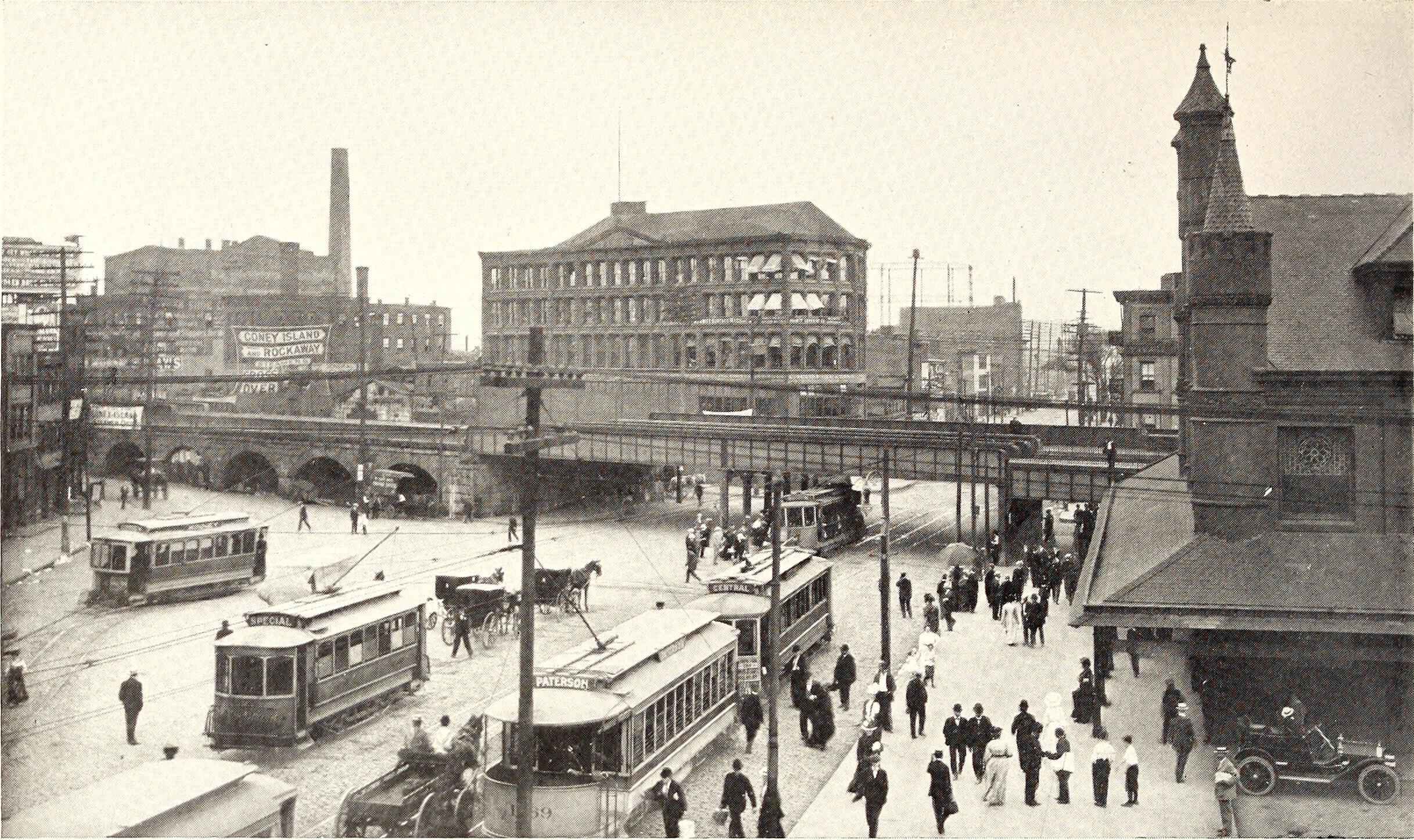
Market Street Station, 1911

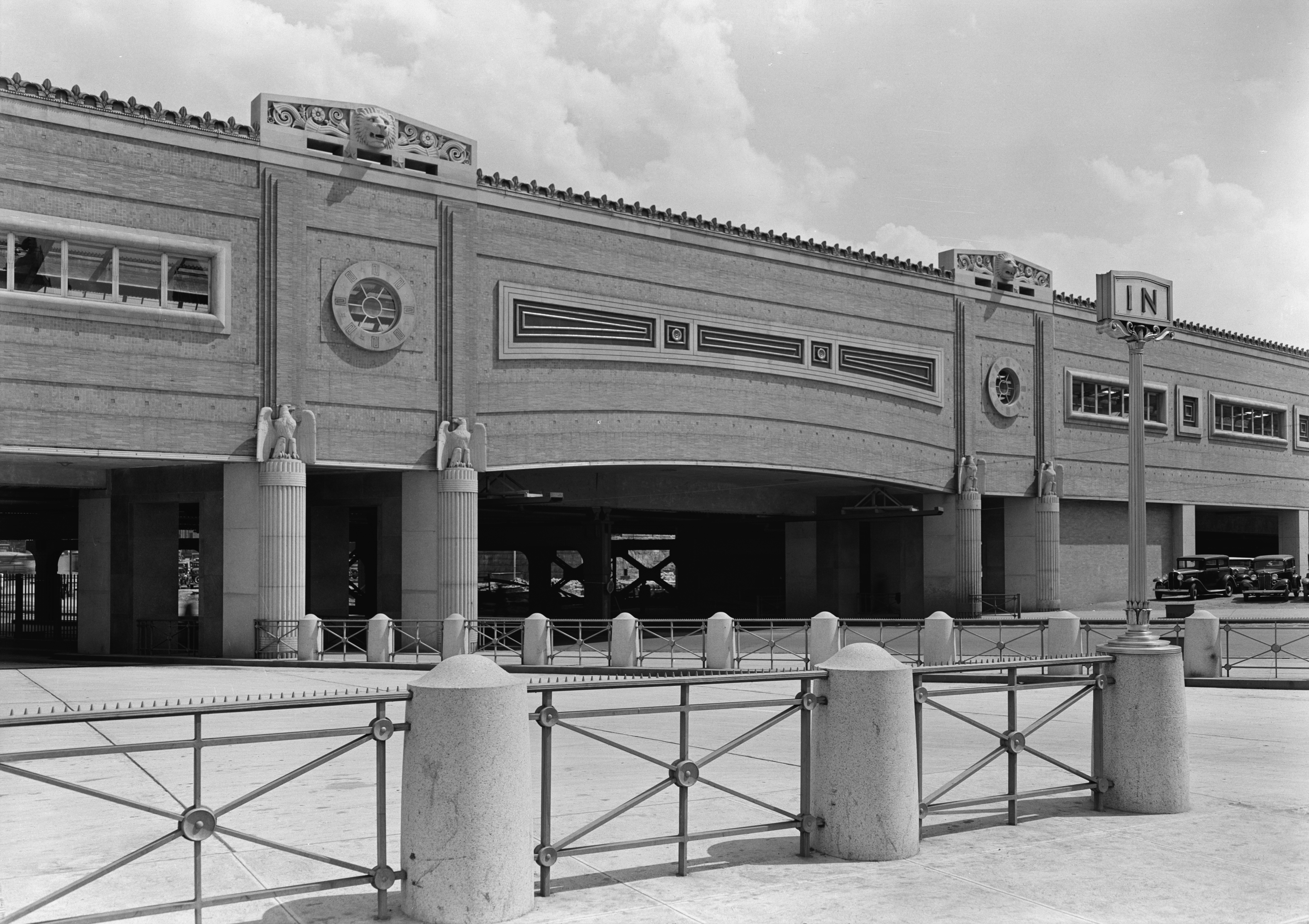
Market Street under Newark Penn Station, June 1935

Designed by the renowned architectural firm McKim, Mead & White, the same team behind the Pennsylvania Railroad's original New York Penn Station ten miles to the east, the station has Art Deco and Neo-Classical features. The main waiting room has medallions showing the history of transportation, from wagons to steamships to cars and airplanes, the eventual doom of the railroad age. Chandeliers are decorated with Zodiac signs. The building was dedicated on March 23, 1935; the first regular train to use it was a New York–Philadelphia express at 10:17 on March 24.

The new station was built alongside (northwest of) the old station, which was then demolished and replaced by the southeast half of the present station, completed in 1937. Except for the separate, underground Newark Light Rail station, all tracks are above street level.

It was to be one of the centerpieces of Pennsylvania Railroad's (PRR's) train network, and to become a transfer point to the Hudson and Manhattan Railroad (now PATH), which was partially funded by the PRR, for travel to lower Manhattan. PRR then scheduled 232 weekday trains through Newark, about two-thirds of them to or from New York Penn Station and the rest to/from Exchange Place in Jersey City.

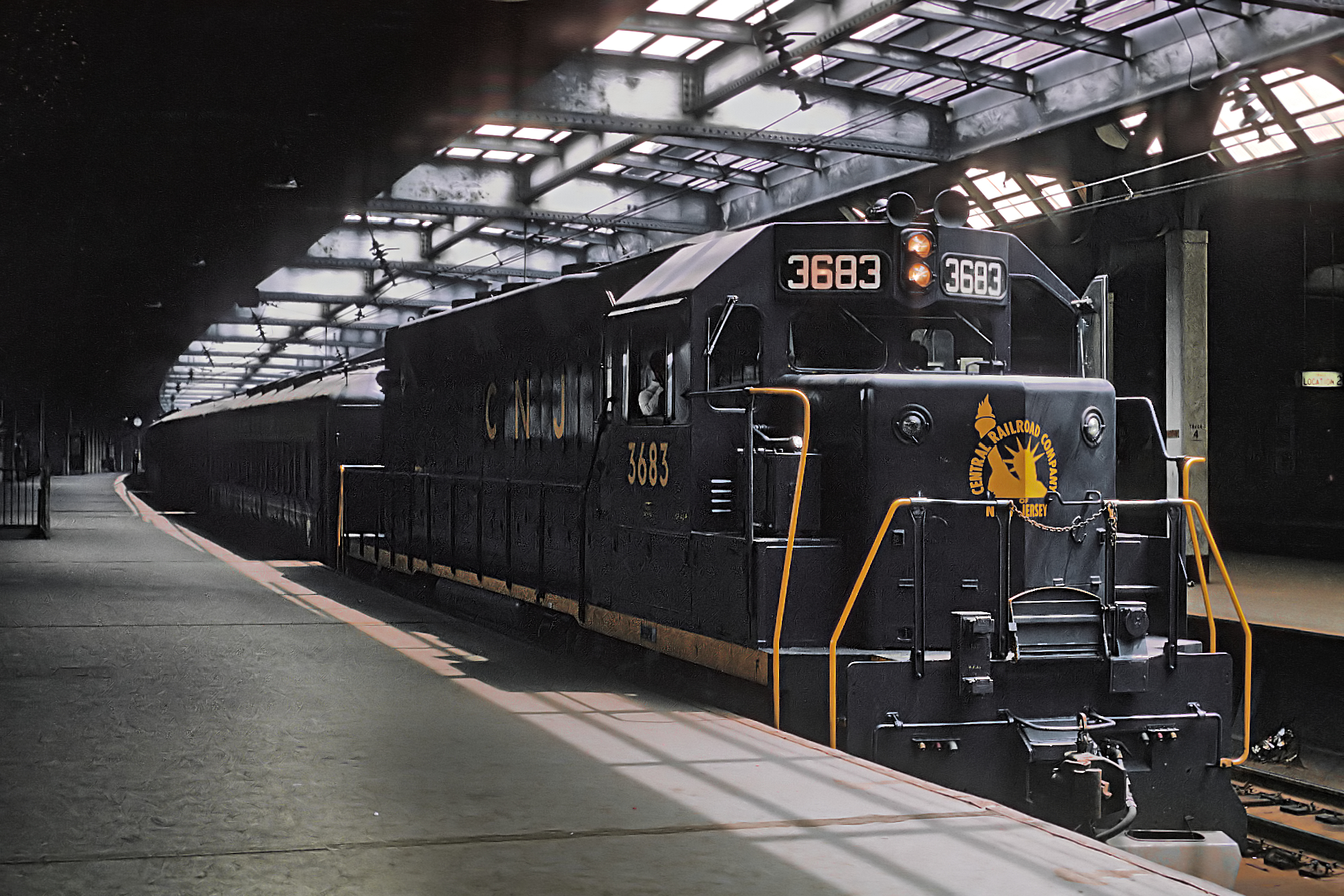
CNJ train at Newark Penn Station, July 1969

The station itself, the adjacent 230-foot Dock Bridge over the Passaic River (the longest three-track railway lift span in existence at the time) and the realignments of the Newark City Subway (now Newark Light Rail) and H&M cost $42 million, borne almost evenly by the PRR and the City of Newark. The City Subway extension and H&M realignment opened on June 20, 1937, and the nearby Manhattan Transfer station was closed, along with the H&M's original Park Place station.

The Port of New York Authority (now the Port Authority of New York and New Jersey) bought the bankrupt H&M Railroad and reorganized it as Port Authority Trans-Hudson in 1962. New Jersey Department of Transportation's Aldene Plan redirected Central Railroad of New Jersey and Reading Railroad trains from Communipaw Terminal in Jersey City to Newark Penn Station in 1967. The Pennsylvania Railroad merged with longtime rival New York Central Railroad in 1968 to form Penn Central Railroad, but Newark kept the name "Penn Station." In 1970, Penn Station became the sole intercity station in Newark when the Erie Lackawanna ran its last intercity trains through Broad Street Station.

After Amtrak took over inter-city service in 1971, Penn Central continued to operate commuter service, despite being bankrupt. In 1976 the New Jersey Department of Transportation acquired Penn Central, Reading and Jersey Central passenger service, which included lines from as far away as Philadelphia's SEPTA diesel service along the West Trenton Line, with Conrail operating service under contract. New Jersey Transit acquired the rail line north of West Trenton in 1982, and established its rail operations division in 1983, acquiring almost all commuter rail service from Conrail within the state.

When Gateway Center and the Newark Legal Center were built, skybridges were also installed to connect these office buildings to Penn Station.

Newark Penn Station was extensively renovated in 2007, with restoration of the facade and historic interior materials (e.g., plaster ceilings, marble and limestone, windows, lighting fixtures), as well as train platform and equipment improvements.

In 2017, the Port Authority of New York and New Jersey conducted a study on extending PATH's Newark–World Trade Center line from Penn Station to Newark Liberty International Airport Station so that passengers could transfer to Newark Liberty International Airport's AirTrain Newark.

In August 2019 the United States Department of Transportation awarded $18.4 million to NJ Transit to rehabilitate and repair Platform "D" that serves Tracks 3 & 4 and is a major transfer point for Amtrak and NJ Transit.

As of 2021, Newark artist Jerry Gant created an installation of five sculptural steel panels as median fencing outside of the station. The abstract designs refer to the history of transportation.

On the morning of December 14, 2023, NJ Transit service was delayed for 45 minutes at Newark Penn Station because a long-horned bull was running loose along one of the station's tracks. The bull, which had escaped from a nearby slaughterhouse, was tranquilized, safely removed from the tracks, and transported to Skylands Animal Sanctuary in Wantage, where he was named Ricardo.

In 2023 ground was broken on the Mulberry Commons Pedestrian Bridge, a 1/2-mile (0.80 km) footbridge over McCarter Highway and the Northeast Corridor and a new train hall entrance with direct access to the platforms at Newark Penn. It will connect Mulberry Commons to Peter Francisco Park in the Ironbound, and eventually link to Newark Riverfront Park.

== Current operations ==
=== Amtrak ===
Despite its proximity to New York Penn Station, Newark Penn is a major station in its own right. In 2014, Newark Penn was the 14th busiest station in the Amtrak system, the eighth busiest in the Mid-Atlantic region (behind New York Penn, Washington Union, Philadelphia, Baltimore Penn, Albany-Rensselaer, BWI Airport and Wilmington) and by far the busiest of the six Amtrak stations in New Jersey. Since the 1970s, it has been the only intercity rail station in heavily populated northeastern New Jersey.

Newark Penn is served by all 10 services running along the Northeast Corridor, providing another option for Amtrak passengers traveling through the New York area.

Due to the wide availability of alternatives, including the Northeast Regional and Acela, as well as NJ Transit's commuter routes, passengers are not usually allowed to use Amtrak's long distance trains to Florida, New Orleans, or Chicago for local travel between Newark and New York.

Newark Penn Station carries the IATA airport code of ZRP.

=== NJ Transit ===
Three NJ Transit commuter rail lines converge here: the Northeast Corridor Line, North Jersey Coast Line and the Raritan Valley Line. The former two continue to New York at all times via Secaucus Junction. The Raritan Valley Line generally terminates here, with the exception of certain off-peak weekday trains that continue to New York and one inbound weekday train that continues to Hoboken. Formerly, the North Jersey Coast Line also offered limited service to Hoboken, though present-day schedules have eliminated this service.

=== PATH ===
Newark Penn Station is the western terminus of the Newark–World Trade Center line of the PATH train, operated by the Port Authority of New York and New Jersey. Trains discharge on Platform H (upper level) and return to service on the lower level (platform B/C). Until the opening of Secaucus Junction in 2003, NJ Transit commuter rail passengers and Amtrak intercity passengers had to transfer to PATH here in order to reach Jersey City or Hoboken.

=== Newark Light Rail ===
On the lower level is the southern terminus of the Newark Light Rail (formerly the Newark City Subway), with three outbound tracks and two inbound tracks. Passengers on this light rail system from Newark and its nearby suburbs can transfer to Amtrak, NJ Transit or PATH trains, or travel to Newark Broad Street or downtown Newark. The Broad Street extension, opened in 2006, was intended to ease transfers between the former Erie Lackawanna commuter routes that call at Broad Street and the Amtrak and former PRR commuter routes that call at Newark Penn Station. Previously, passengers had to make their own way (usually by taxi or bus) between the two stations.

=== Tracks and platforms ===
Newark Penn Station has eight tracks and six platforms for both NJT and PATH (Newark Light Rail not included), but PATH trains from NYC arrive on the upper level and ones from South Street arrive on the lower level.

- Track A is less-used and has a side platform, usually for Raritan Valley Line arrivals. Trains relay and lay-up at Hudson Yard in Harrison before returning on Track 5 for the reverse trip. Occasionally also used by Amtrak trains to New York Penn Station.
- Track 1 is normally used by New Jersey Transit trains to New York Penn Station and is served by an island platform shared with Track M.
- Track 2 is typically used by northbound Amtrak and New Jersey Transit express trains. This track has an island platform that is shared with track M.
- Track 3 is usually used by southbound Amtrak trains, though westbound New Jersey Transit Northeast Corridor Line express trains will often use this track in the evening rush hours. This platform has an island platform shared with track 4.
- Track 4 is normally used by westbound New Jersey Transit trains traveling via Newark Airport or Rahway.
- Track 5 is usually used by westbound Raritan Valley Line trains and weekend eastbound Raritan Valley Line trains terminating. This track has a side platform. This track has closed periodically since 2013 for extensive construction and renovations.
- Track M is the track for departing PATH trains to World Trade Center in Lower Manhattan.
- Track H is for discharging PATH trains. This upper-level track, which did not have turnstiles until 2005, has stairs to Track 2, along with ramps to Tracks 3 and 4, and a separate stairway to Track 5. Trains relay and lay-up south of the station before returning on Track M for the trip to World Trade Center. There are two pairs of crossover switches south of the station for that purpose, as well as a center track from which trains can be reversed quickly.

== Gallery ==
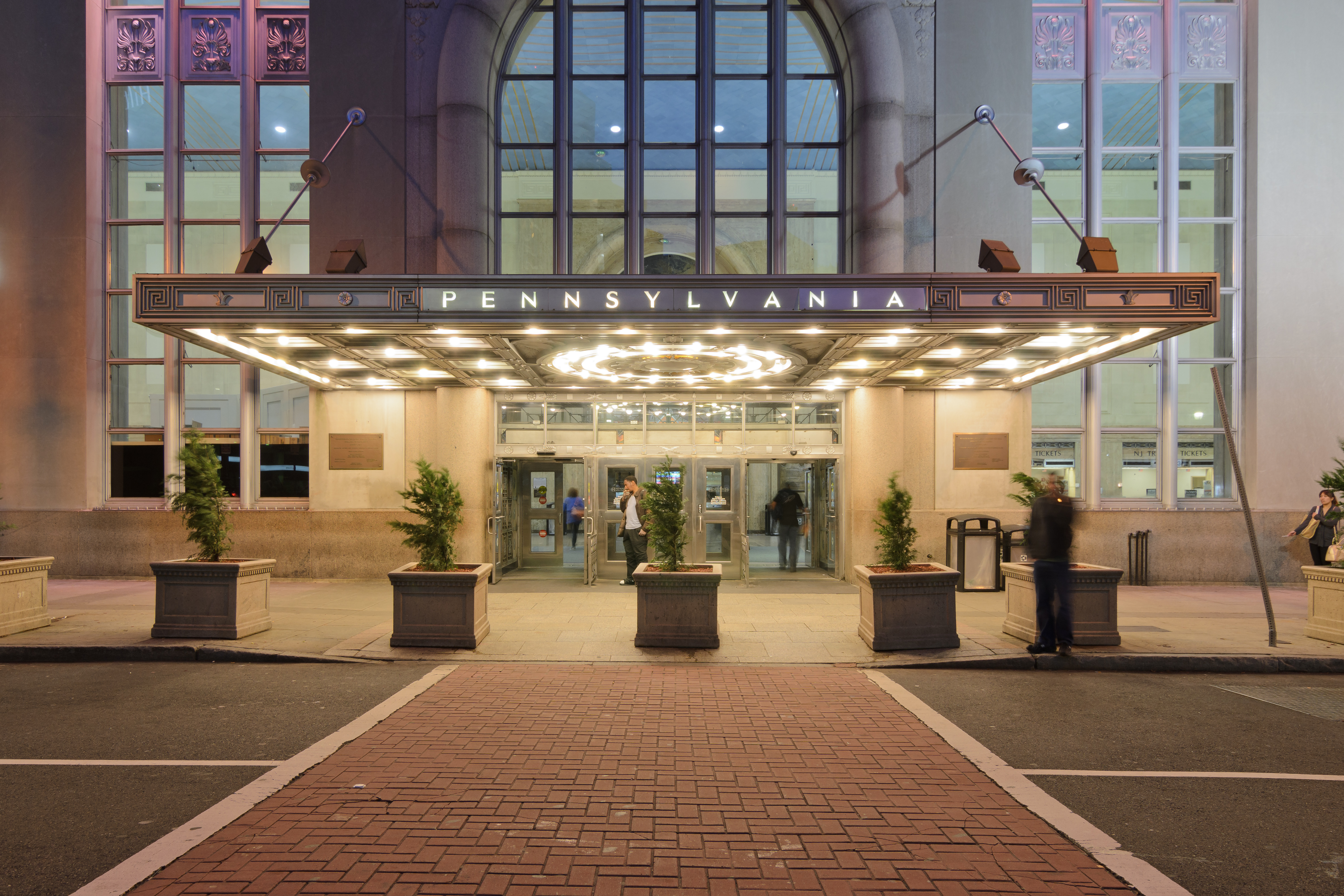
Main entrance at night

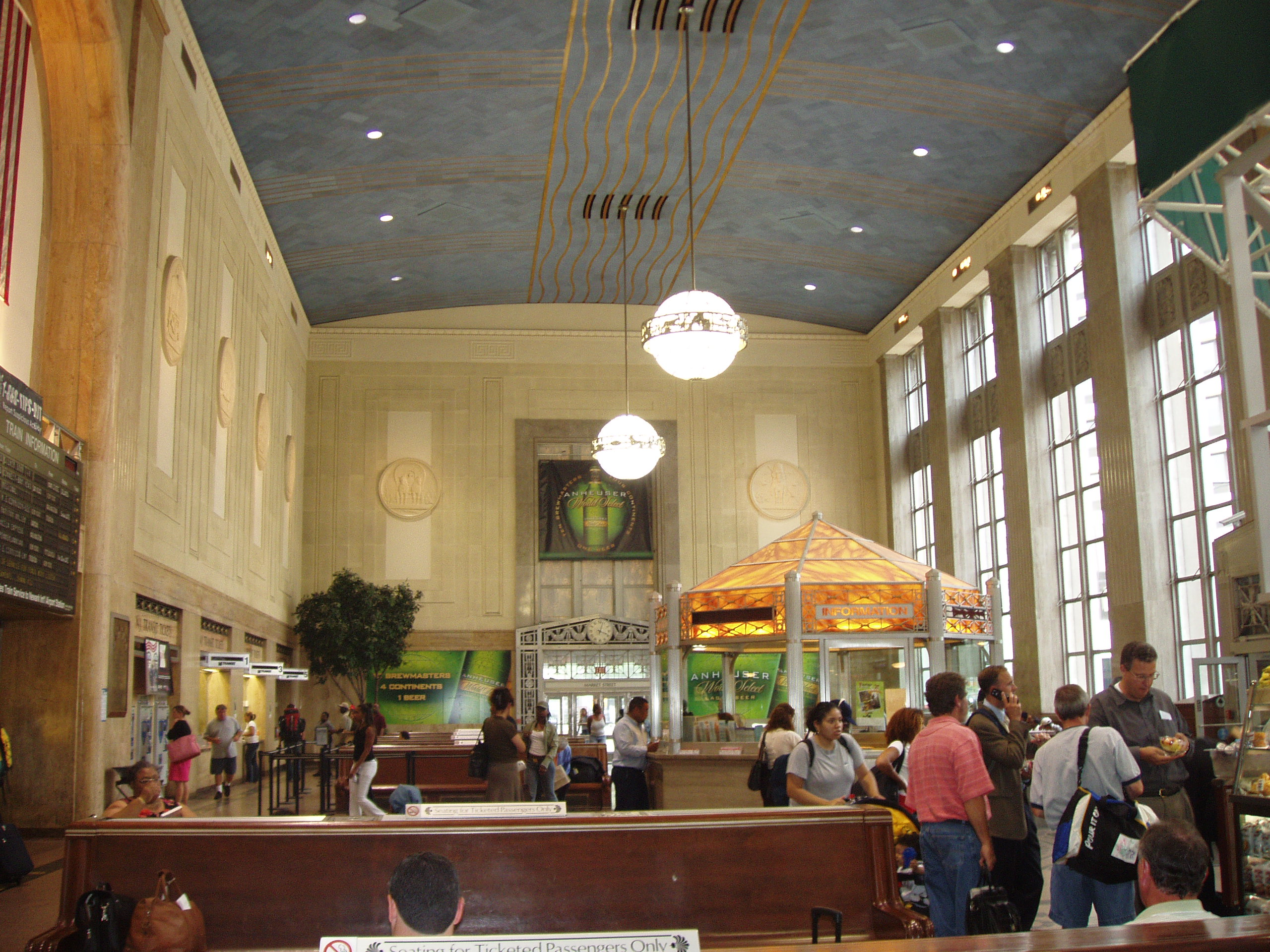
Interior of main waiting room, featuring an information booth

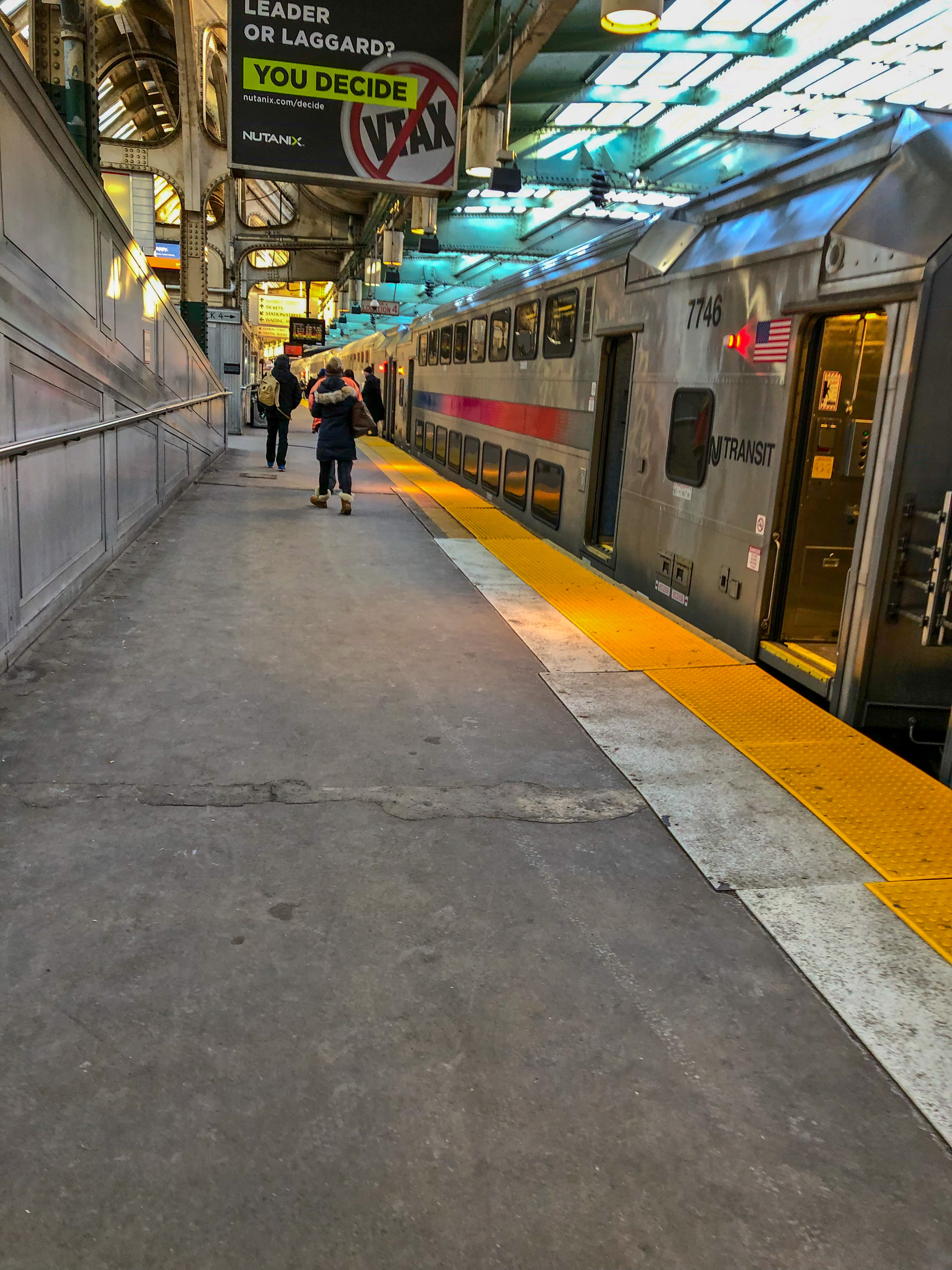
A multi-level NJ Transit train at Newark Penn Station

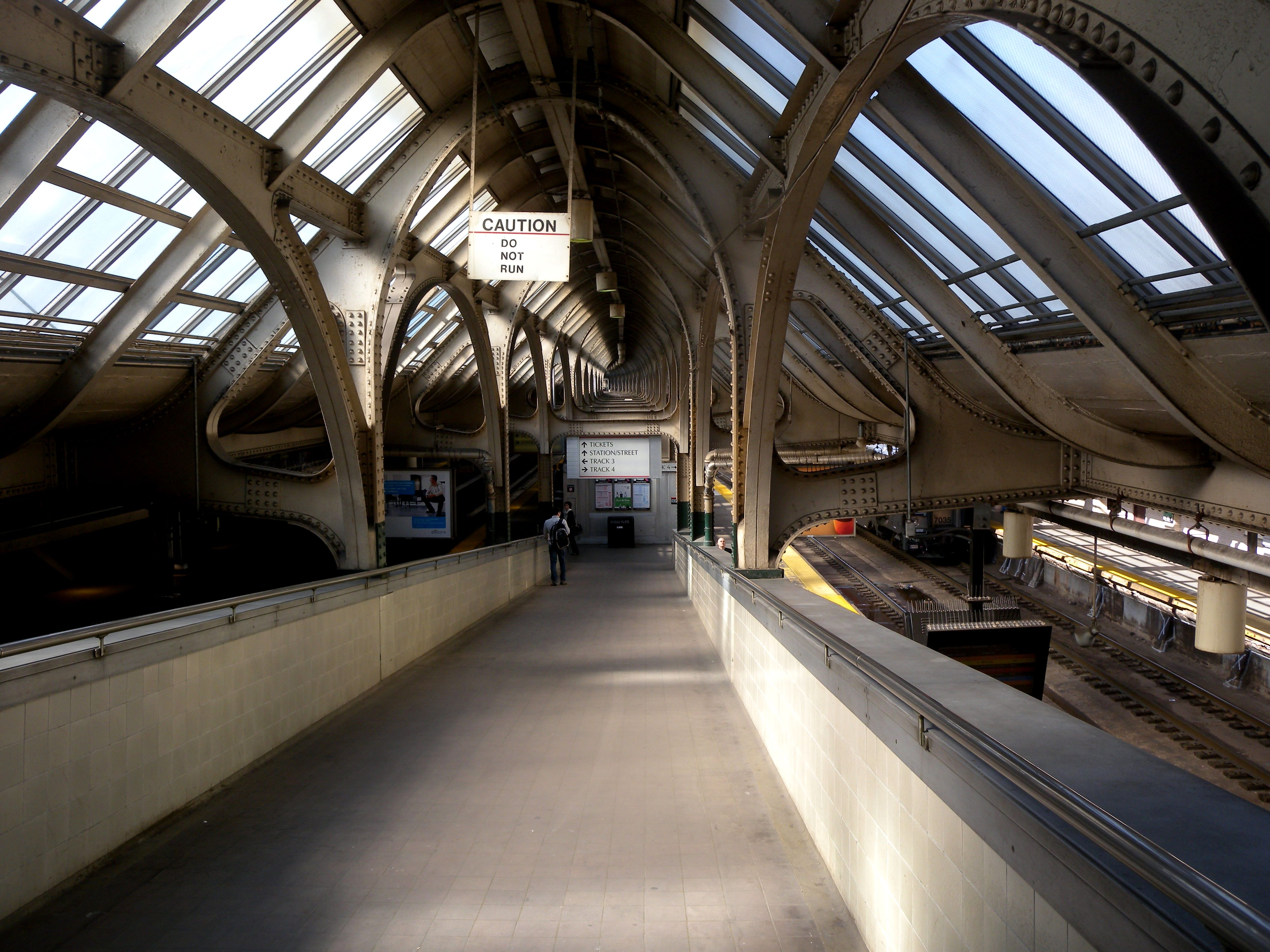
Pedestrian ramp

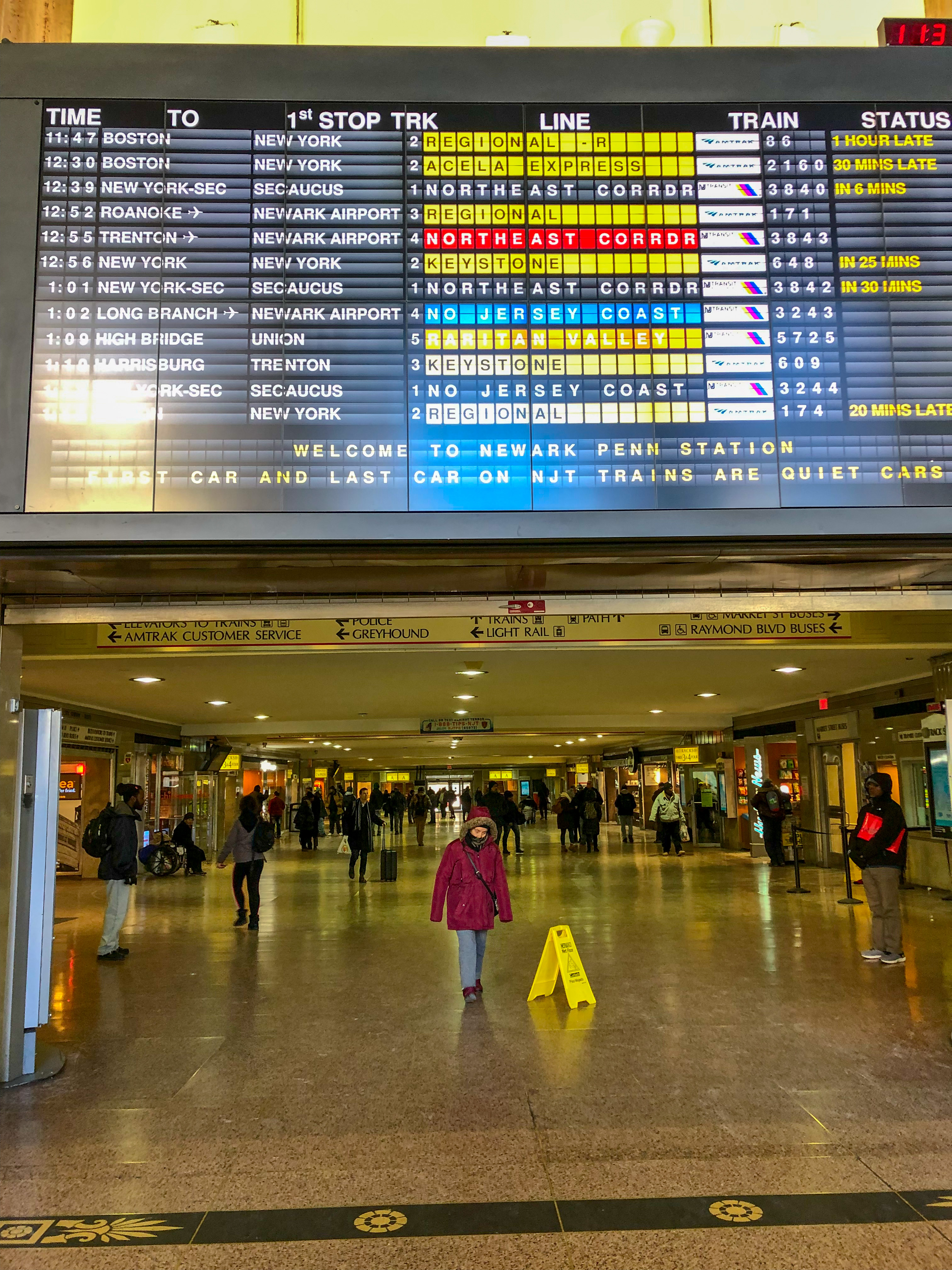
Main corridor to tracks
