= Newark Liberty International Airport Station =

NJ Transit and Amtrak station

Newark Liberty International Airport
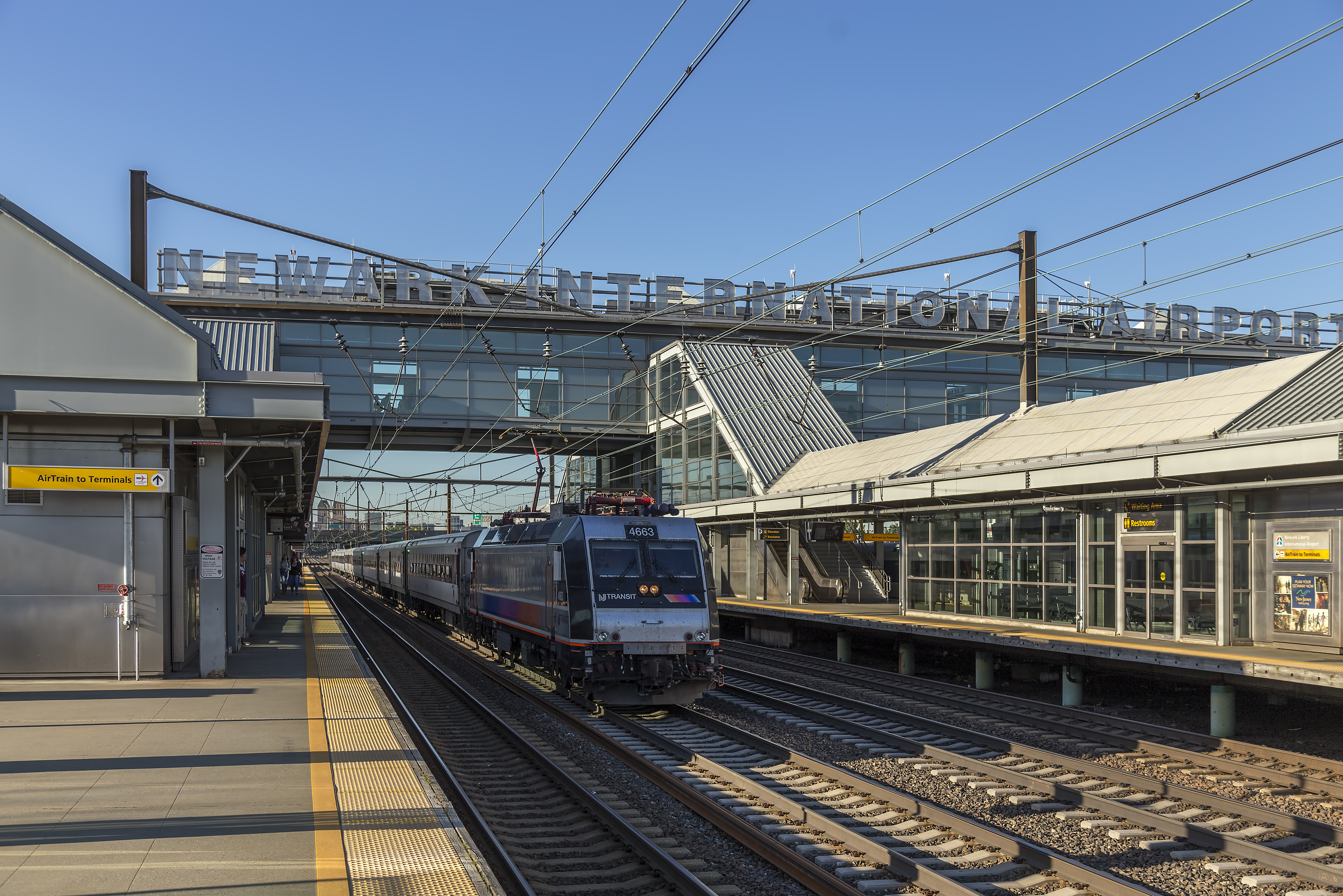
- An NJ Transit train passes through the station in June 2017.

General information
- Location: 3 Brewster Road; Newark, New Jersey; United States
- Coordinates: 40°42′16″N 74°11′26″W
- Owner: Port Authority of New York and New Jersey
- Line: Amtrak Northeast Corridor
- Platforms: 2 island platforms
- Tracks: 6
- Connections: AirTrain Newark (via replacement shuttle buses to and from P4)

Construction
- Accessible: Yes
- Architect: HNTB

Other information
- Station code: Amtrak: EWR
- IATA code: EWR
- Fare zone: 1 (NJ Transit)

History
- Opened: October 21, 2001

Passengers
NJ Transit Rail Operations
- 2025: 4,161 (average weekday)
- Rank: 6 of 153
Amtrak
- FY 2025: 201,751 annually

Services
Preceding station	Amtrak	Following station
Metropark toward Harrisburg	Keystone Service limited service	Newark Penn toward New York
Metropark toward Norfolk, Newport News or Roanoke	Northeast Regional	Newark Penn toward Boston South or Springfield
Acela does not stop here
Cardinal does not stop here
Carolinian does not stop here
Crescent does not stop here
Palmetto does not stop here
Pennsylvanian does not stop here
Silver Meteor does not stop here
Vermonter does not stop here
Preceding station	NJ Transit	Following station
North Elizabeth toward Trenton	Northeast Corridor Line	Newark Penn toward New York
North Elizabeth toward Bay Head	North Jersey Coast Line	Newark Penn toward New York
Proposed services
Preceding station	PATH	Following station
Terminus	NWK–WTC	Newark toward World Trade Center
Location

Newark Liberty International Airport Station (also known as Newark Airport Rail Station and Newark RaiLink station, and often announced simply as Newark Airport) is a railroad hub on the Northeast Corridor (NEC) in Newark, New Jersey. The station provides access to Newark Liberty International Airport (EWR) via the AirTrain Newark monorail which connects the station to the airport's terminals and parking areas. The station is served by New Jersey Transit's (NJT) Northeast Corridor Line and North Jersey Coast Line and Amtrak's Northeast Regional and Keystone Service trains.

The station, located in the Dayton neighborhood of the city, is accessible only by train. A project to expand the station to include direct pedestrian access is under construction.

== Station layout ==
It is owned by the Port Authority of New York and New Jersey (PANYNJ), the airport's operator, and therefore has a different design from other New Jersey Transit and Amtrak stations, especially the signage, which is the same as used throughout the airport.

NJ Transit trains typically stop on the outer platform tracks, while Amtrak trains typically stop on the inner platform tracks. The two center tracks, which do not serve the station, are used by express NJ Transit trains, as well as Amtrak services that do not stop here (the Acela and long-distance services).

Passengers connecting between the Northeast Corridor and AirTrain Newark must pass through faregates and pay a fee.

The facility was built with no direct pedestrian access from nearby streets.

== History ==
=== Opening ===
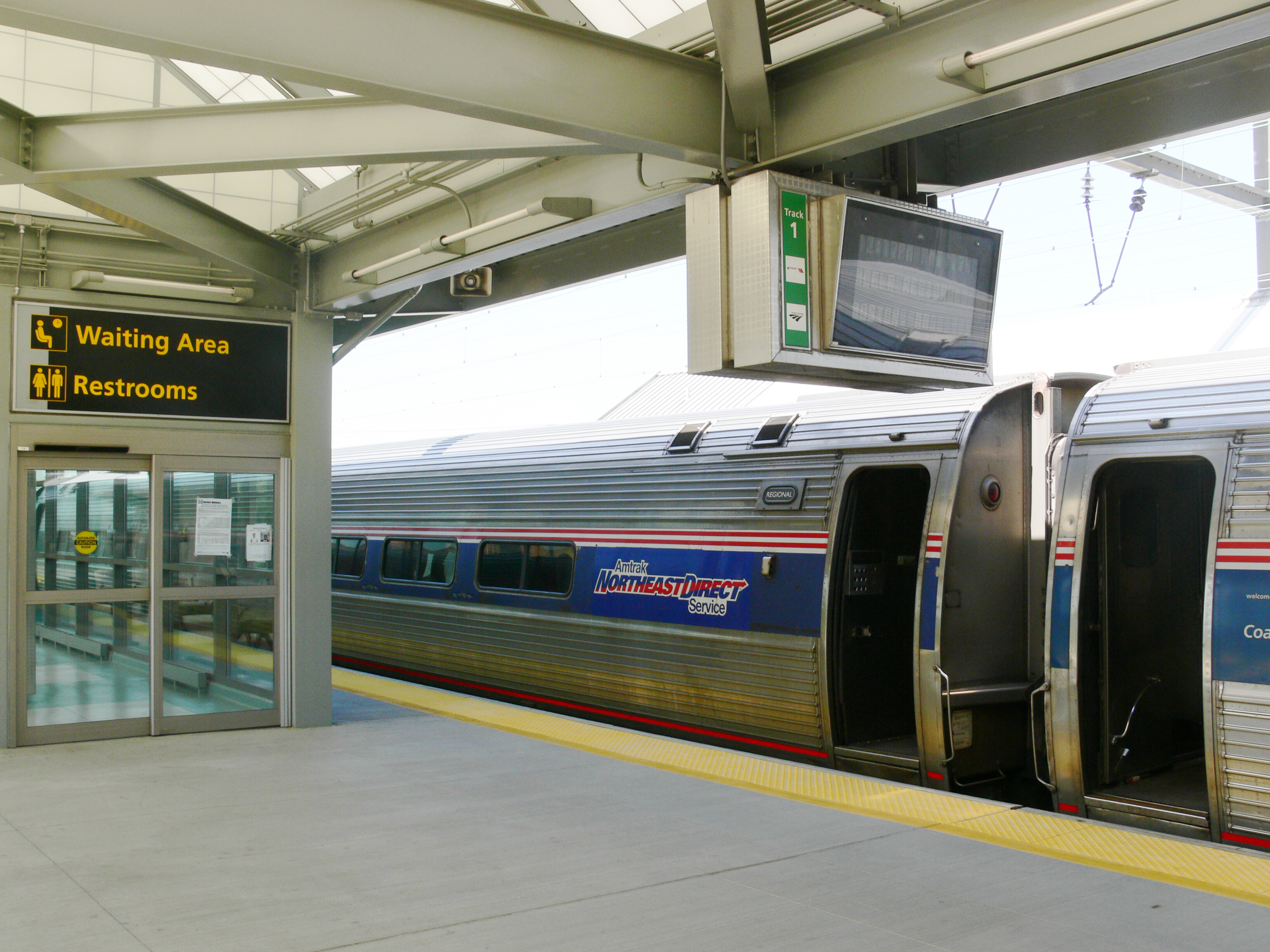
An Amtrak Northeast Regional train at the station in 2007

The station opened on October 21, 2001. $250 million of the US$400 million cost (equivalent to US$727 million in 2025) facility was funded through a surcharge on airline passengers.

Since federal regulations only allowed those funds to be used for facilities exclusively for people using airport facilities, no street access was provided. In April 2001, Hartz Mountain Industries planned on submitting a plan to build a new hotel and conference center on an old rail yard and connect it to the station. To get around the federal regulation, the developers proposed having a concierge desk in the passageway to restrict access to the hotel to airport travelers.

The Port Authority originally intended to name the station "Newark Airport" but changed it to "Newark Liberty International Airport" after the airport's renaming, which honors the victims of the September 11 attacks and the proximity of the airport to the Statue of Liberty.

Amtrak increased Northeast Regional service at the station by one-quarter in July 2024.

On January 15, 2026, AirTrain service to and from this station has been replaced by shuttle buses due to construction related to the replacement project, during which shuttle buses will provide replacement service between this station and P4, requiring passengers to connect to and from the AirTrain for service between P4 and the terminals.

=== PATH extension proposal ===
In September 2012, the Port Authority of New York and New Jersey announced that work would commence on a study to explore extending the PATH system to the station. The new station would be located at ground level to the west of the existing NJ Transit station. A storage yard for PATH trains would also be built. There would be a park and ride facility at the stop, with a new entrance to the surrounding Dayton neighborhood, and an overpass to the existing NJ Transit and AirTrain platforms.

In 2014, the PANYNJ proposed a 10-year capital plan that included the PATH extension, which was approved by the Board of Commissioners on February 19 of that year. However, in late 2014, there were calls for reconsideration of Port Authority funding priorities. The PATH extension followed the route of existing Manhattan-to-Newark Airport train service, while there was no funding for either the Gateway Tunnel under the Hudson River, or the replacement of the aging and overcrowded Port Authority Bus Terminal. On January 11, 2017, the PANYNJ released its 10-year capital plan that included $1.7 billion for the extension. Under the plan, construction was projected to start in 2020.

The PANYNJ announced in March 2023 that it was deferring funding for the Newark Airport extension to a future capital plan.

=== Street access ===
On March 16, 2023, the PANYNJ's Board of Commissioners authorized the completion of a $12 million study that would plan and design a new street-level entrance to the station from neighborhoods to the west via a new access point on Frelinghuysen Avenue (New Jersey Route 27). This would allow the local community to get improved transit access at a cost substantially lower than a PATH extension. The project was initially expected to cost $125 million, and PANYNJ applied for a $45 million grant from the federal Rebuilding American Infrastructure with Sustainability and Equity (RAISE) Grant program. PANYNJ's Board of Commissioners approved a $160 million contract to build the project on March 28, 2024. Work was expected to be completed in 2026. On June 13, 2025, the Port Authority broke ground on the project.
