= Columbia Transportation =

Columbia University campuses bus network

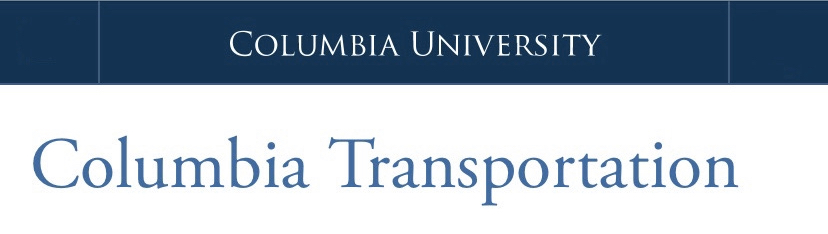

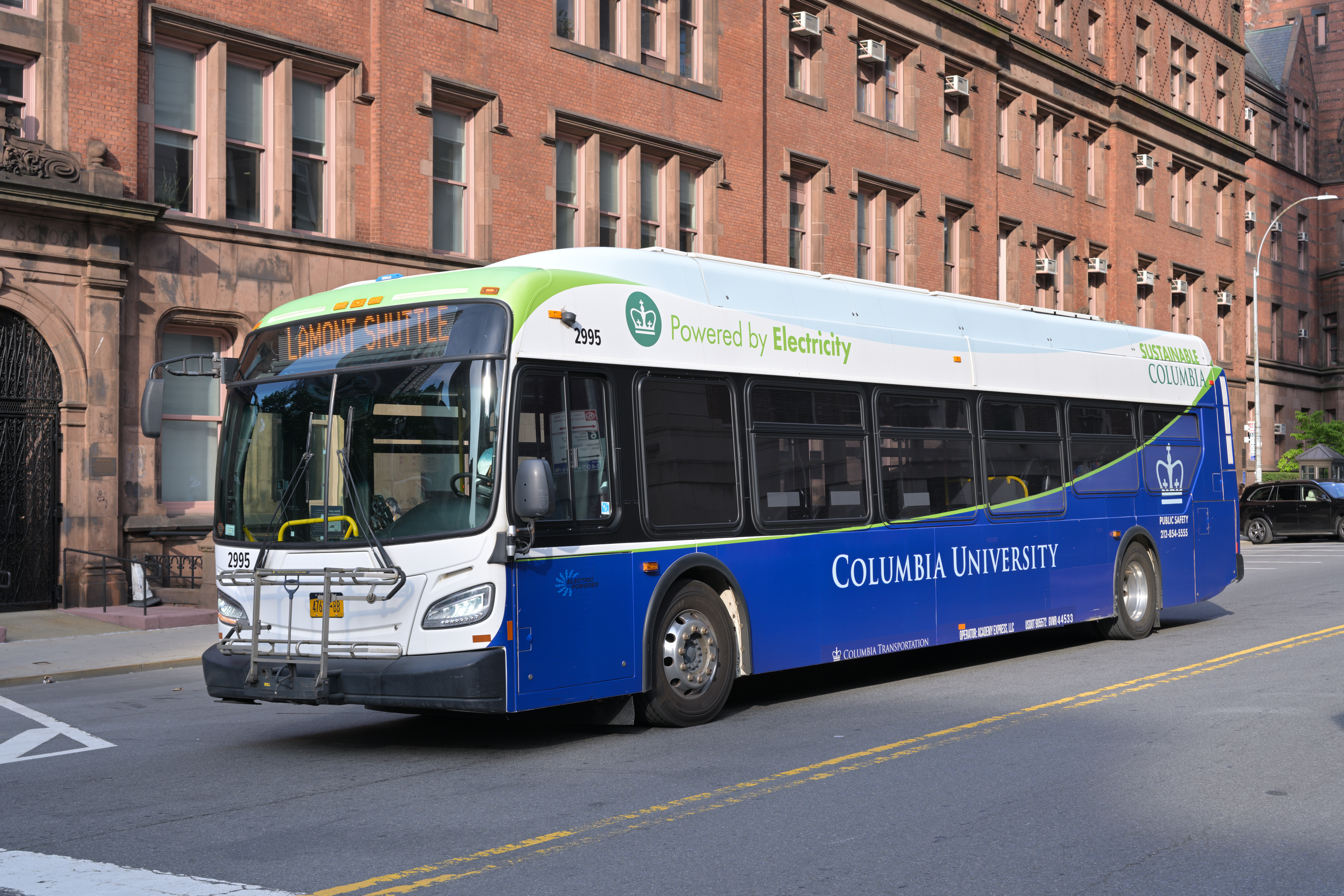
- New Flyer XE40 electric bus No. 2995 on the Lamont Shuttle
- Parent: Columbia University
- Locale: Manhattan, The Bronx, Palisades, New York
- Service area: Upper Manhattan, Riverdale, Fort Lee, Palisades-Lamont
- Service type: University Shuttle bus
- Routes: 8
- Hubs: CUIMC Campus; 166th Street at Broadway
- Fleet: Fleet
- Daily ridership: ~700 on the Intercampus Shuttle per day ~100 on the Lamont Shuttle per day
- Fuel type: Diesel and Electric
- Operator: Academy Bus Lines and Luxury Transportation
- Website: Official website

Columbia Transportation is a fare-free bus network providing service to Columbia University campuses. It is operated by Academy Bus Lines and Luxury Transportation to serve employees and students. The buses are open to all Columbia faculty, students, Dodge Fitness Center members, and anyone else who holds a Columbia ID card.

== Routes ==
=== Active routes ===
Route	Termini		Via	Notes
Arbor Shuttle	Morningside Heights; Morningside Campus; 120th Street at Amsterdam Avenue	Riverdale; Arbor; 235th Street at Henry Hudson Parkway	Henry Hudson Parkway	Operated by subcontractors for Columbia Residential using minibuses; Serves CUIMC by request
Fort Lee Shuttle	Fort Lee, New Jersey; Parker Plaza; Lewis Street at Center Avenue	Washington Heights; CUIMC Campus; 169th Street at Broadway	George Washington Bridge	Rush hours only
Intercampus Shuttles (Green, Blue, and Red Lines)	Washington Heights; CUIMC Campus; 167th Street at Broadway	Upper West Side; 96th Street at Broadway	Broadway, 125th St, St Nicholas Av (rush hours only)	Open to senior citizens, Medicare Card holders, and Access-A-Ride ID card holders, as well as Columbia ID holders; Runs via 125th St are rush hours only; Limited service to Harlem Hospital; Limited service ends at 116th Street, does not continue to 96th Street
Intercampus Shuttles (Green, Blue, and Red Lines)	Washington Heights; CUIMC Campus; 167th Street at Broadway	Upper West Side; 96th Street at Broadway	Broadway	Open to senior citizens, Medicare Card holders, and Access-A-Ride ID card holders, as well as Columbia ID holders; Runs via 125th St are rush hours only; Limited service to Harlem Hospital; Limited service ends at 116th Street, does not continue to 96th Street
Intercampus Shuttle; Green Line	Harlem; Harlem Hospital; 135th Street at Lenox Avenue (limited service)	Upper West Side; 96th Street at Broadway	Broadway, St Nicholas Av, 135th St	Open to senior citizens, Medicare Card holders, and Access-A-Ride ID card holders, as well as Columbia ID holders; Runs via 125th St are rush hours only; Limited service to Harlem Hospital; Limited service ends at 116th Street, does not continue to 96th Street
Manhattanville Shuttle	Morningside Heights; Morningside Campus	Manhattanville Loop	Broadway, 12th Av	Discontinued in April 2020, reactivated in September 2021.
Lamont Shuttle	Morningside Heights; Morningside Campus; 120th Street at Broadway	Palisades; Lamont–Doherty Earth Observatory	George Washington Bridge, Route 9W	Rush hour trips run express; One trip in the rush hour direction each morning uses an Academy coach bus.
Bakers Field Shuttle	Morningside Heights; Morningside Campus	Inwood; Bakers Field; West 218th St at Broadway	Henry Hudson Pkwy	Uses Academy-branded coach buses

=== Former Routes ===
Route	Termini		Via	Notes
Yankee Stadium Commuter Route	Washington Heights; CUIMC Campus; 167th Street at Broadway	Yankee Stadium	Broadway, 161st Street	Discontinued due to extremely low ridership. Replaced by East Manhattan Commuter Route
Hoboken Shuttle Pilot	Hoboken; Willow Av at 14th St	Manhattanville; Amsterdam Av at 125th St	10th Avenue	Discontinued in June 2021 after the Intercampus Shuttle changed to the summer schedule.
Manhattan Commuter Shuttle	Midtown Manhattan; Penn Station	Washington Heights; CUIMC Campus; 167th Street at Broadway	8th/9th Avenues, Broadway	Discontinued on December 30, 2021
Brooklyn via West Manhattan Commuter Shuttle	Downtown Brooklyn; Tillary St at Jay St	Washington Heights; CUIMC Campus; 167th Street at Broadway	Broadway, 8th/9th Avenues, Canal Street, Manhattan Bridge	Discontinued on December 30, 2021
Brooklyn via East Manhattan Commuter Shuttle	Downtown Brooklyn; Tillary St at Jay St	Washington Heights; CUIMC Campus; 167th Street at Broadway	Broadway, 110th Street, 2nd/3rd Avenues, Canal Street, Manhattan Bridge	Discontinued on December 30, 2021
Queens-Riverdale Commuter Shuttle	Citi Field; Southfield Commuter Lot	Riverdale; West 238th St at Riverdale Av	Grand Central Pkwy, 125th Street, Broadway	Discontinued on December 30, 2021
Morningside Loop	Morningside Heights; Morningside Campus Loop		120th St, Amsterdam Av, 113th St, Broadway	Temporary shuttle established on May 4, 2024 during the closure of Columbia campus due to the pro-Palestinian campus occupation.; This route was operated in-house by Columbia Transportation and Columbia Public Safety, not by Academy.; The shuttle was discontinued on May 7, 2024

=== Columbia Commuter Shuttles ===
In August 2020, Columbia announced that they would start commuter shuttle service in the Fall 2020 semester. These buses would function as express buses, linking areas that do not have direct connections to Columbia to each campus. The contractor for these routes is Academy Bus Lines, using coach buses. The original system included the Yankee Stadium Commuter Route, which functioned essentially as a park and ride route, however this was discontinued due to extremely low ridership. The buses assigned to the Yankee Stadium route were reassigned to the East Manhattan Route. The Queens-Riverdale Commuter Route, however still serves the Southfield Commuter Lot at Citi Field park and ride in Queens. The Commuter Shuttle Service ended on December 30, 2021.

=== Evening Shuttle ===
On June 9, 2020, Columbia announced that the Evening Shuttle service, previously provided by the Columbia Public Safety department, would restart with an on-demand service model. Users would order cars from the ridesharing service Via, and provided the rides were within the coverage area, Columbia Transportation would reimburse. This program would operate 7 days a week, from 6 pm to 3 am in the summer, and 4 pm to 3 am in the winter. In January 2022, Service was expanded eastwards, covering much of Central Harlem. In June 2022, the service was changed to operate from 8 pm to 3 am. The service was estimated to have 162,000 riders during the 2021-2022 academic year. On September 1, 2022, the hours were changed again. Rides would operate from 6 to 8 pm, only from street corner to street corner, and past 8 pm on a door-to-door basis, where rides are offered to anywhere in the zone.

== Fleet ==
=== Active ===
==== Intercampus, Lamont, Manhattanville, and Fort Lee Shuttles ====
Fleet number(s)	Photo	Year	Manufacturer	Model	Garage	Notes
2114-2119		2007-2008	Nova Bus	LFS TL40102A	Hoboken	Formerly owned by Rutgers Campus Buses, transferred to Columbia Transportation in 2011; Various buses retired; 2118 retired
2400		2015	New Flyer	XD40	Hoboken	Used on Lamont Shuttle
2991-2996		2018	New Flyer	XE40 Xcelsior CHARGE	Hoboken	
4987		2007	Orion Bus Industries	Orion VII OG	Hoboken	Formerly used for Port Authority of New York and New Jersey service

==== Baker Field Shuttle ====
Fleet number(s)	Photo	Year	Manufacturer	Model	Garage	Notes
6405-6410		2013	Van Hool	C2045	Hoboken	Can be used on Fort Lee Shuttle

==== Arbor Shuttle ====
The Arbor Shuttle uses various cutaway buses operated by subcontractors for Columbia Residential.

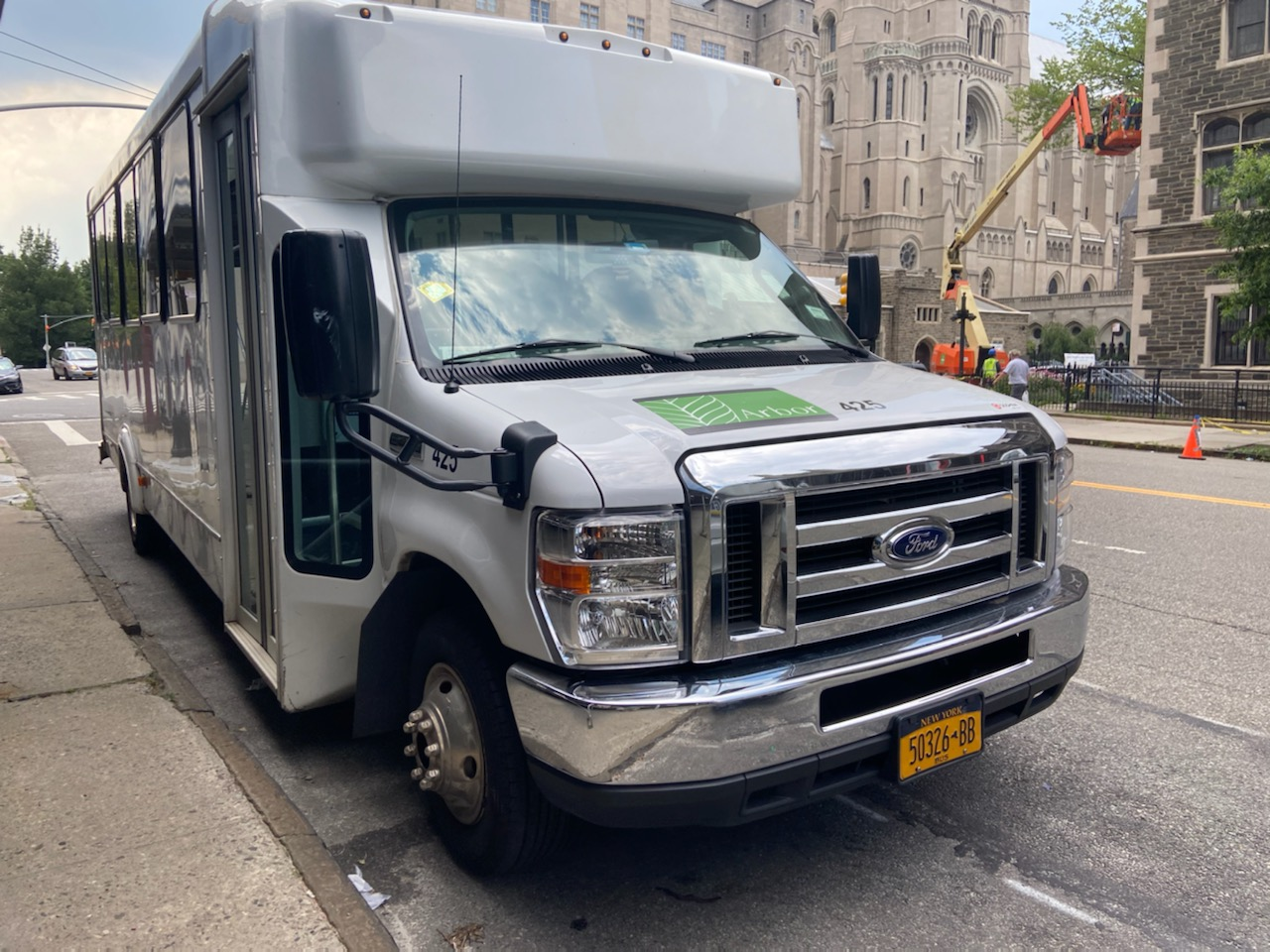
Arbor Shuttle Ford cutaway

=== Retired ===
Fleet number(s)	Photo	Year	Manufacturer	Model	Notes	
2101-2113		2006	Nova Bus	LFS TL40102A	Formerly owned by Rutgers Campus Buses, transferred to Columbia Transportation in 2011; Some units used for New York University service; Retired in 2018; 2105 and 2110 reactivated in 2022, have been re-retired	
2114, 2118		2007	Nova Bus	LFS TL40102A	Formerly owned by Rutgers Campus Buses, transferred to Columbia Transportation in 2011; 2115-2117 still active	
2143		2017	Nova Bus	LFS TL40102A	Formerly owned by New York University, transferred to Columbia in late 2019 to replace bus #2114.; Used on the Manhattanville Shuttle; Transferred to Academy’s operations in Boston in April 2020 with the discontinuance of the Manhattanville Shuttle.	
Former Commuter Shuttle buses
6711, 6730, 6784-6795		2015-2018	Van Hool	CX45		Former Commuter Shuttle buses, not used in Columbia Commuter services anymore, but still used for Academy services.; Can be used on Lamont Shuttle if needed.
6838-6852		2020	Van Hool	CX45	Some units used for other Academy services.	Former Commuter Shuttle buses, not used in Columbia Commuter services anymore, but still used for Academy services.; Can be used on Lamont Shuttle if needed.
1608-1611		2015	MCI	J4500		Former Commuter Shuttle buses, not used in Columbia Commuter services anymore, but still used for Academy services.; Can be used on Lamont Shuttle if needed.
1618-1620		2020	MCI	J4500		Former Commuter Shuttle buses, not used in Columbia Commuter services anymore, but still used for Academy services.; Can be used on Lamont Shuttle if needed.
3512-3520		2017	Van Hool	CX35		Former Commuter Shuttle buses, not used in Columbia Commuter services anymore, but still used for Academy services.; Can be used on Lamont Shuttle if needed.
1344-1349		2018	Prévost	H3-45	Some units used for other Academy services.	Former Commuter Shuttle buses, not used in Columbia Commuter services anymore, but still used for Academy services.; Can be used on Lamont Shuttle if needed.
1350-1361, 1363		2019-2020	Prévost	H3-45	1361 and 1363 are 2020 units	Former Commuter Shuttle buses, not used in Columbia Commuter services anymore, but still used for Academy services.; Can be used on Lamont Shuttle if needed.
19040-19046		2019	MCI	D4500CT	All owned by New Jersey Transit; Used only occasionally as backup buses; Normally used on Academy routes in NJ	Former Commuter Shuttle backup buses, not used in Columbia Commuter services anymore, but still used for Academy routes in New Jersey
