= Niner Transit =

Public transit authority serving the University of North Carolina at Charlotte

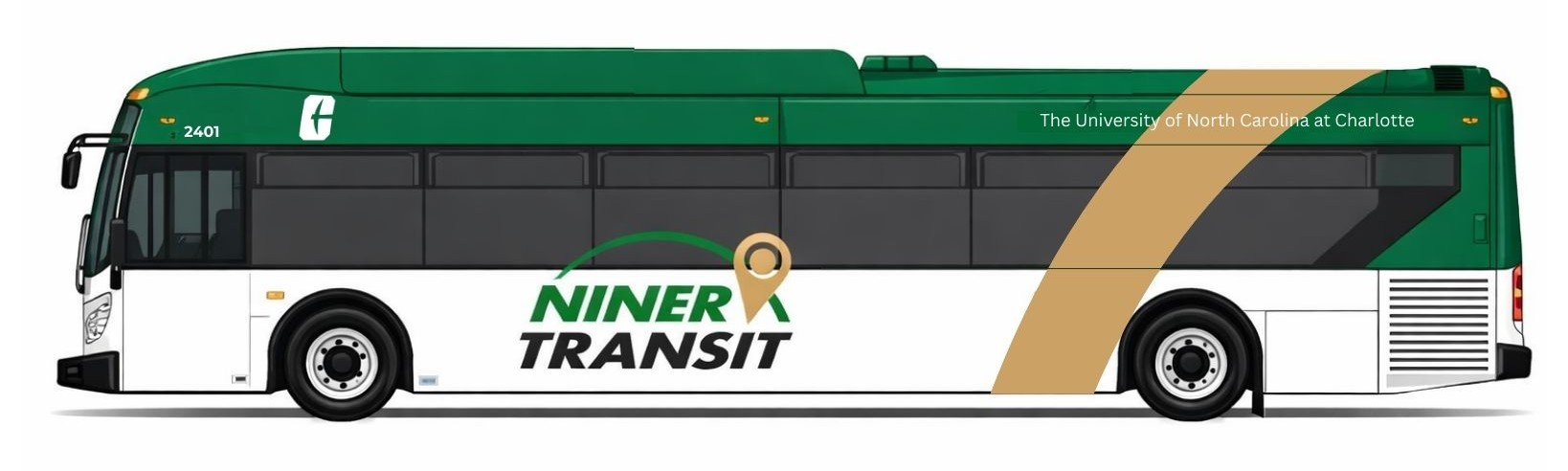

Overview
- Area served: University City (Charlotte, NC)
- Transit type: Bus
- Number of lines: 5
- Number of stations: 48
- Annual ridership: 2.6 million
- Website: Official website

Operation
- Began operation: August 2017
- Operators: Academy Bus Lines & UNC Charlotte Parking and Transportation Services
- Number of vehicles: 24

Niner Transit is a zero-fare bus service serving the students, staff, faculty, and general public on and around the University of North Carolina at Charlotte's campus in Charlotte, North Carolina. Since it began operations in July 2017, Academy Bus Lines and the University provide year-round service, with Academy operating traditional bus services and the University operating student-only shuttles and paratransit services.

Currently, Niner Transit operates 3 bus routes and 2 shuttle bus routes on a regular basis. Of the 5 routes, 3 run on weekdays 6:00 am to 2:00 am, with various shuttle and ParaTransit services on limited schedules. On weekends, the Green and Silver routes are the only routes that provide service, running from 9:00am to 2:00 am.

As of March 6, 2026, Academy Bus Lines’ original contract that was expected to end June 30, 2027, has been extended to June 30, 2028.

== Fleet ==
As of February 2026, Niner Transit's fleet consists of 13 transit buses, 8 shuttles, and 3 ParaTransit vans, with vehicles ranging in production years from 2011 to 2025. Despite utilizing vehicles as old as 2011, Niner Transit's operators, Academy Bus Lines and UNC Charlotte's PaTS, ensure that all vehicles are well-maintained and kept in excellent working condition.

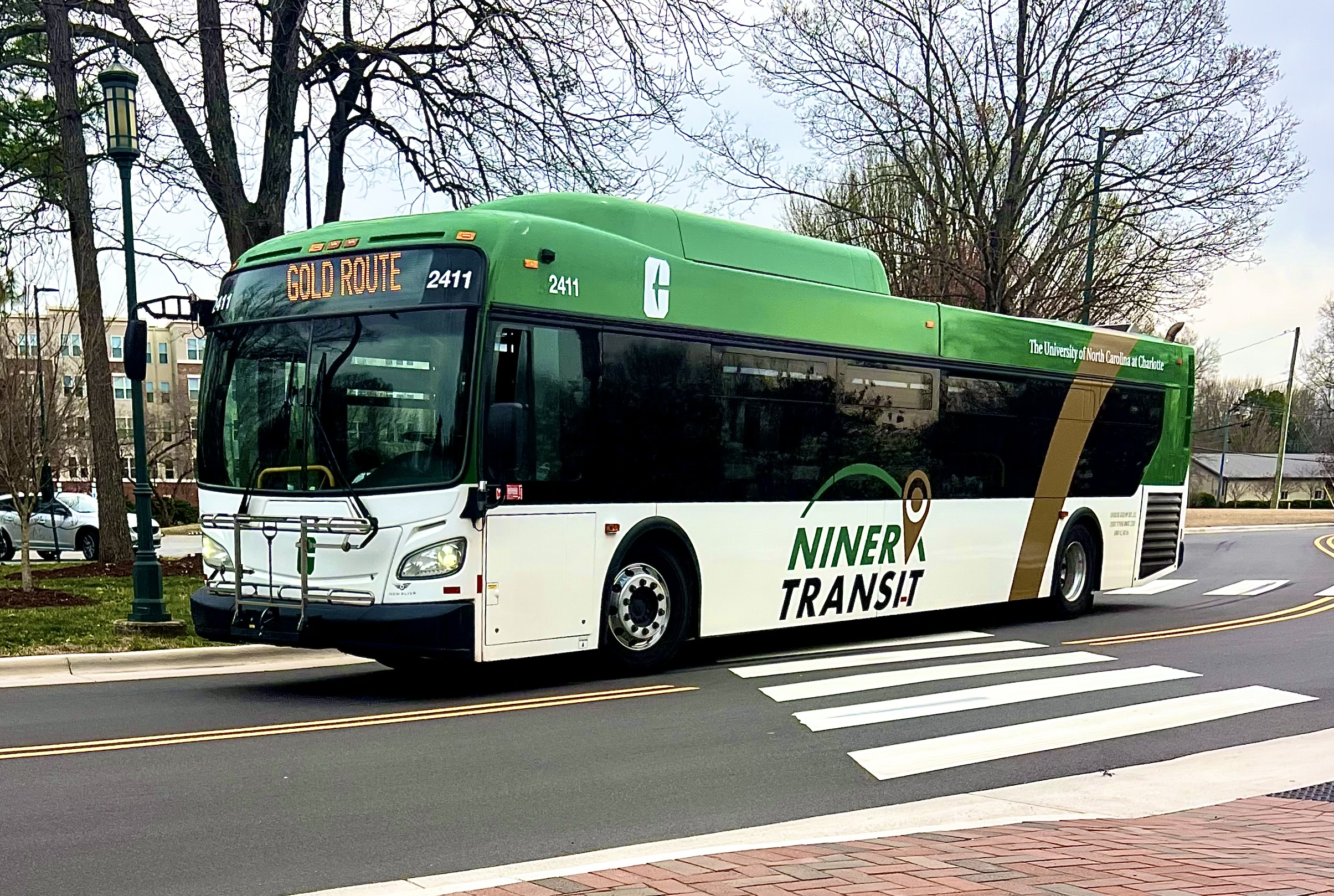
UNC Charlotte’s Niner Transit bus 2411 operating on the Gold Route

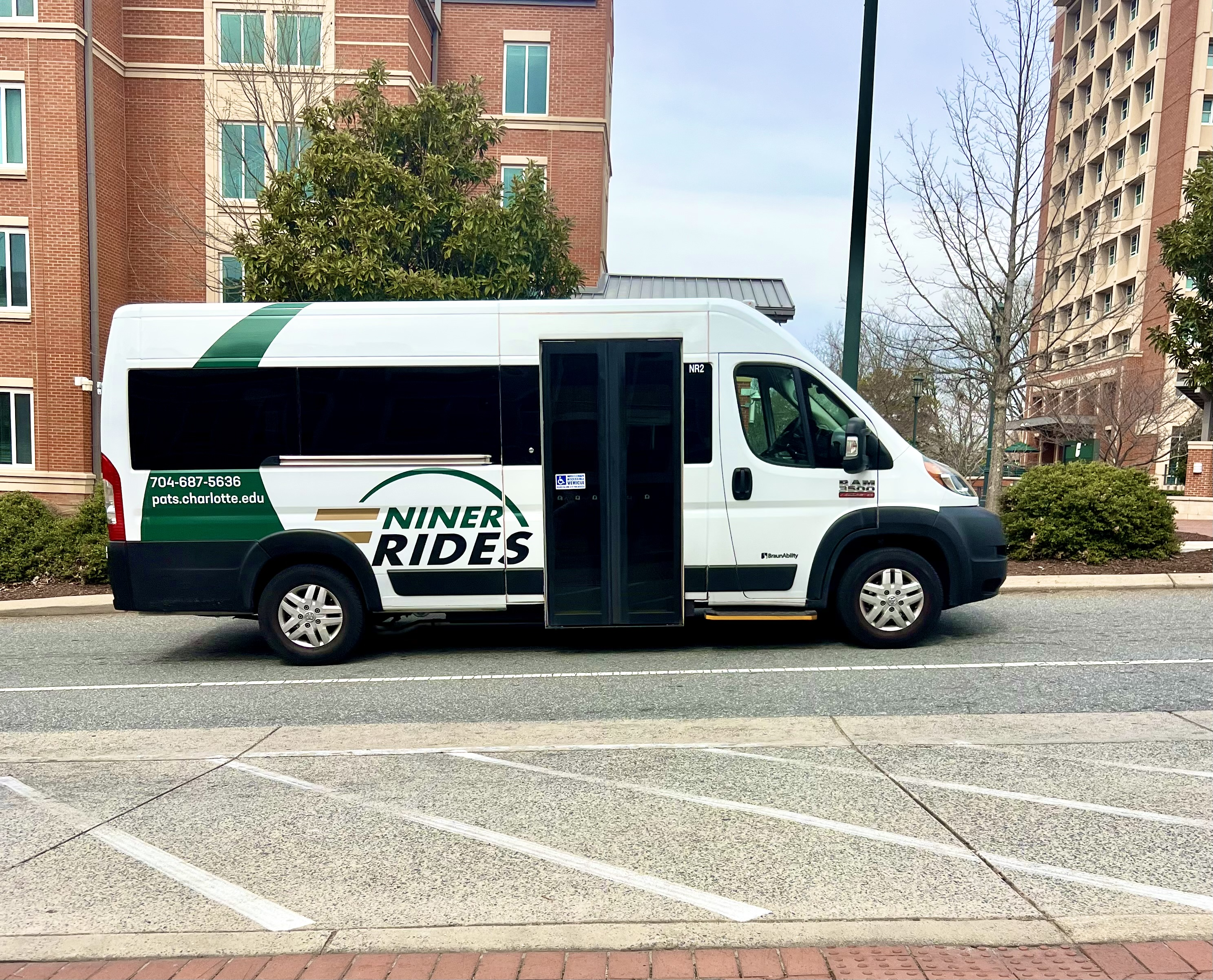
UNC Charlotte’s Niner Rides Paratransit Van NR2

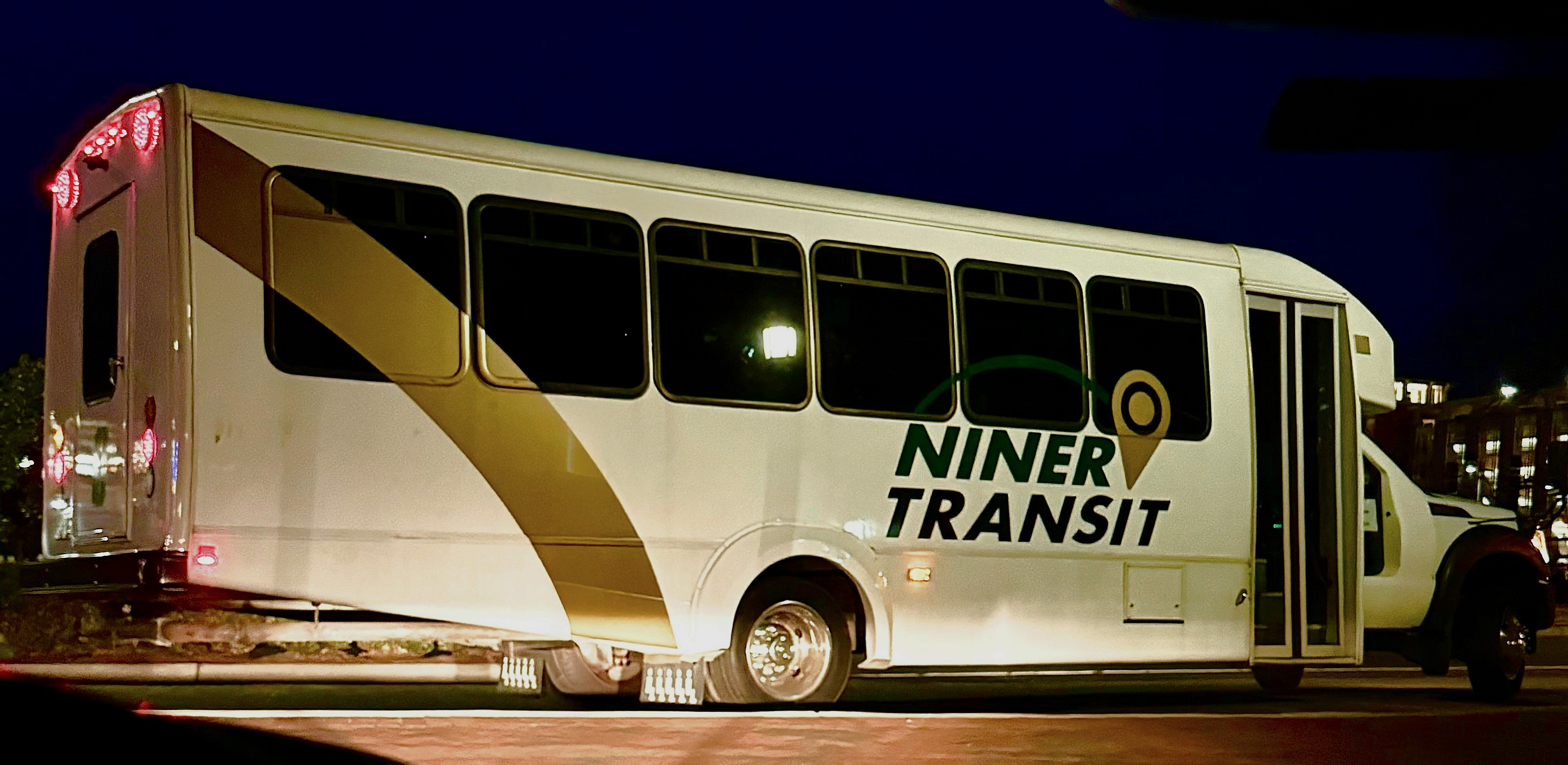
Niner Transit Bus S6 Operating the Shopping Shuttle at Night

=== Active Fleet ===
Fleet number	Operator	Builder and model name	Year built	Length	Seats	Notes
2401	Academy Bus Lines	New Flyer Industries; XD-40	2018	40 ft (12 m)	36	Entered Service in March 2018.
2402	Academy Bus Lines	New Flyer Industries; XD-40	2018	40 ft (12 m)	36	Entered Service in March 2018.
2403	Academy Bus Lines	New Flyer Industries; XD-40	2018	40 ft (12 m)	36	Entered Service in March 2018.
2404	Academy Bus Lines	New Flyer Industries; XD-40	2018	40 ft (12 m)	36	Entered Service in March 2018.
2405	Academy Bus Lines	New Flyer Industries; XD-40	2018	40 ft (12 m)	36	Entered Service in March 2018.
2406	Academy Bus Lines	New Flyer Industries; XD-40	2018	40 ft (12 m)	36	Entered Service in March 2018.
2407	Academy Bus Lines	New Flyer Industries; XD-40	2018	40 ft (12 m)	36	Entered Service in March 2018.
2408	Academy Bus Lines	New Flyer Industries; XD-40	2018	40 ft (12 m)	36	Entered Service in March 2018.
2409	Academy Bus Lines	New Flyer Industries; XD-40	2018	40 ft (12 m)	36	Entered Service in March 2018.
2410	Academy Bus Lines	New Flyer Industries; XD-40	2018	40 ft (12 m)	36	Entered Service in March 2018.
2411	Academy Bus Lines	New Flyer Industries; XD-40	2018	40 ft (12 m)	36	Entered Service in March 2018.
2412	Academy Bus Lines	New Flyer Industries; XD-40	2018	40 ft (12 m)	36	Entered Service in March 2018.
S2 (2nd)	UNC Charlotte PaTS	Starcraft Allstar; Ford E-450	2025	20 ft (6.1 m)	13	Handicap Accessible
S3 (2nd)	UNC Charlotte PaTS	Starcraft Allstar; Ford E-450	2025	20 ft (6.1 m)	13	Handicap Accessible
S4 (2nd)	UNC Charlotte PaTS	Starcraft Allstar; Ford E-450	2025	24 ft (7.3 m)	22	
S5	UNC Charlotte PaTS	Starcraft Allstar XL; Ford F-550	2013	28 ft (8.5 m)	26	Handicap Accessible
S6	UNC Charlotte PaTS	Starcraft Allstar XL; Ford F-550	2013	28 ft (8.5 m)	30	
NR1	UNC Charlotte PaTS	Starcraft ProMaster; Ram 3500	2023	20 ft (6.1 m)	8	Designated ParaTransit vehicle
NR2	UNC Charlotte PaTS	Starcraft ProMaster; Ram 3500	2023	20 ft (6.1 m)	8	Designated ParaTransit vehicle
NR3	UNC Charlotte PaTS	Starcraft ProMaster; Ram 3500	2023	20 ft (6.1 m)	8	Designated ParaTransit vehicle

=== Spare Fleet ===
Fleet number	Operator	Builder and model name	Year built	Length	Seats	Notes
S2 (1st)	UNC Charlotte PaTS	Starcraft Allstar; Ford E-450	2011	20 ft (6.1 m)	13	Handicap Accessible. Replaced from regular service in 2025 by new buses.
S3 (1st)	UNC Charlotte PaTS	Starcraft Allstar; Ford E-450	2013	20 ft (6.1 m)	13	Handicap Accessible. Replaced from regular service in 2025 by new buses.
S4 (1st)	UNC Charlotte PaTS	Starcraft Allstar; Ford E-450	2013	20 ft (6.1 m)	22	Handicap Accessible. Replaced from regular service in 2025 by new buses.

=== Future Fleet ===
Fleet number	Operator	Builder and model name	Year built	Length	Seats	Notes
(15 Buses)	TBD	New Flyer Industries; XD-40	2028	40 ft (12 m)	37	Buses will be procured by new contractor, and will be owned by university at the conclusion of contract. Will enter service July 1, 2028.

=== Former Fleet ===
Fleet number	Operator	Builder and model name	Year built	Exited Service	Length	Seats	Notes
2101	Academy Bus Lines	Nova Bus; LFS	2006	2018	40 ft (12 m)	35	Entered service in Summer 2017 and were replaced by the New Flyer XD-40 buses.
2102	Academy Bus Lines	Nova Bus; LFS	2006	2018	40 ft (12 m)	35	Entered service in Summer 2017 and were replaced by the New Flyer XD-40 buses.
2103	Academy Bus Lines	Nova Bus; LFS	2006	2018	40 ft (12 m)	35	Entered service in Summer 2017 and were replaced by the New Flyer XD-40 buses.
2104	Academy Bus Lines	Nova Bus; LFS	2006	2018	40 ft (12 m)	35	Entered service in Summer 2017 and were replaced by the New Flyer XD-40 buses.
2111	Academy Bus Lines	Nova Bus; LFS	2006	2018	40 ft (12 m)	35	Entered service in Summer 2017 and were replaced by the New Flyer XD-40 buses.
2112	Academy Bus Lines	Nova Bus; LFS	2006	2018	40 ft (12 m)	35	Entered service in Summer 2017 and were replaced by the New Flyer XD-40 buses.
2113	Academy Bus Lines	Nova Bus; LFS	2006	2018	40 ft (12 m)	35	Entered service in Summer 2017 and were replaced by the New Flyer XD-40 buses.
2114	Academy Bus Lines	Nova Bus; LFS	2007	2018	40 ft (12 m)	35	Entered service in Summer 2017 and were replaced by the New Flyer XD-40 buses.
2130	Academy Bus Lines	Nova Bus; LFS	2007	2018	40 ft (12 m)	35	Entered service in Summer 2017 and were replaced by the New Flyer XD-40 buses.
2131	Academy Bus Lines	Nova Bus; LFS	2007	2018	40 ft (12 m)	35	Entered service in Summer 2017 and were replaced by the New Flyer XD-40 buses.
2132	Academy Bus Lines	Nova Bus; LFS	2007	2018	40 ft (12 m)	35	Entered service in Summer 2017 and were replaced by the New Flyer XD-40 buses.
2133	Academy Bus Lines	Nova Bus; LFS	2007	2018	40 ft (12 m)	35	Entered service in Summer 2017 and were replaced by the New Flyer XD-40 buses.
2501	Academy Bus Lines	New Flyer Industries; XD-40	2013	2026	40 ft (12 m)	38	Utilized as a spare, for charters, and for training from January 2026 through June 2026 before transferring to Rutgers University.
S1	UNC Charlotte PaTS	Starcraft Allstar; Ford E-450	2009	2019	20 ft (6.1 m)	15	Handicap Accessible
PARA1	UNC Charlotte PaTS	VPG; MV-1	2017	2023	15 ft (4.6 m)	4	Designated ParaTransit Vehicle. Replaced in 2023 by the Starcraft ProMaster 3500.
PARA2	UNC Charlotte PaTS	VPG; MV-1	2017	2023	15 ft (4.6 m)	4	Designated ParaTransit Vehicle. Replaced in 2023 by the Starcraft ProMaster 3500.
PARA3	UNC Charlotte PaTS	VPG; MV-1	2017	2023	15 ft (4.6 m)	4	Designated ParaTransit Vehicle. Replaced in 2023 by the Starcraft ProMaster 3500.
CASSI	Beep	Navya Autonom	2023	2023	15.6 ft (4.8 m)	11	Part of an NCDOT pilot program that ran from July through December 2023.

== Routes ==
=== Active Routes ===
Niner Transit offers 5 routes on a regular basis, 2 Gameday-only bus routes, and prearranged ParaTransit & Charter services. Additionally, the University also operates the "49er ColdRush" Route during snowdays.

Route	Hours	Stops
Green	Mon - Fri: 6 am - 2 am Sat - Sun: 9 am - 2 am	Light Rail West
Green	Mon - Fri: 6 am - 2 am Sat - Sun: 9 am - 2 am	Belk Hall
Green	Mon - Fri: 6 am - 2 am Sat - Sun: 9 am - 2 am	Student Union East
Green	Mon - Fri: 6 am - 2 am Sat - Sun: 9 am - 2 am	Auxiliary Services
Green	Mon - Fri: 6 am - 2 am Sat - Sun: 9 am - 2 am	Fretwell South
Green	Mon - Fri: 6 am - 2 am Sat - Sun: 9 am - 2 am	Cato Hall South
Green	Mon - Fri: 6 am - 2 am Sat - Sun: 9 am - 2 am	Robinson Hall South
Green	Mon - Fri: 6 am - 2 am Sat - Sun: 9 am - 2 am	Reece West
Green	Mon - Fri: 6 am - 2 am Sat - Sun: 9 am - 2 am	Cone Deck
Green	Mon - Fri: 6 am - 2 am Sat - Sun: 9 am - 2 am	Alumni Way East
Green	Mon - Fri: 6 am - 2 am Sat - Sun: 9 am - 2 am	South Village Deck
Green	Mon - Fri: 6 am - 2 am Sat - Sun: 9 am - 2 am	Gage Undergraduate Admissions
Green	Mon - Fri: 6 am - 2 am Sat - Sun: 9 am - 2 am	Robinson Hall North
Green	Mon - Fri: 6 am - 2 am Sat - Sun: 9 am - 2 am	Cato Hall North
Green	Mon - Fri: 6 am - 2 am Sat - Sun: 9 am - 2 am	Fretwell North
Green	Mon - Fri: 6 am - 2 am Sat - Sun: 9 am - 2 am	Student Health North
Green	Mon - Fri: 6 am - 2 am Sat - Sun: 9 am - 2 am	FM/PPS
Green	Mon - Fri: 6 am - 2 am Sat - Sun: 9 am - 2 am	North Deck
Silver	Mon - Fri: 6 am - 2 am Sat - Sun: 9 am - 2 am	CRI Deck
Silver	Mon - Fri: 6 am - 2 am Sat - Sun: 9 am - 2 am	Duke Centennial Hall
Silver	Mon - Fri: 6 am - 2 am Sat - Sun: 9 am - 2 am	EPIC South
Silver	Mon - Fri: 6 am - 2 am Sat - Sun: 9 am - 2 am	Athletics Complex East
Silver	Mon - Fri: 6 am - 2 am Sat - Sun: 9 am - 2 am	Student Union East
Silver	Mon - Fri: 6 am - 2 am Sat - Sun: 9 am - 2 am	Auxiliary Services
Silver	Mon - Fri: 6 am - 2 am Sat - Sun: 9 am - 2 am	Student Health North
Silver	Mon - Fri: 6 am - 2 am Sat - Sun: 9 am - 2 am	Martin Hall
Silver	Mon - Fri: 6 am - 2 am Sat - Sun: 9 am - 2 am	Lot 6
Silver	Mon - Fri: 6 am - 2 am Sat - Sun: 9 am - 2 am	Lot 5A
Silver	Mon - Fri: 6 am - 2 am Sat - Sun: 9 am - 2 am	East Deck 2
Silver	Mon - Fri: 6 am - 2 am Sat - Sun: 9 am - 2 am	Fretwell North
Silver	Mon - Fri: 6 am - 2 am Sat - Sun: 9 am - 2 am	Klein Hall
Silver	Mon - Fri: 6 am - 2 am Sat - Sun: 9 am - 2 am	Student Union West
Silver	Mon - Fri: 6 am - 2 am Sat - Sun: 9 am - 2 am	Athletics Complex West
Silver	Mon - Fri: 6 am - 2 am Sat - Sun: 9 am - 2 am	EPIC North
Silver	Mon - Fri: 6 am - 2 am Sat - Sun: 9 am - 2 am	Grigg Hall
Silver	Mon - Fri: 6 am - 2 am Sat - Sun: 9 am - 2 am	BATT Cave
Silver	Mon - Fri: 6 am - 2 am Sat - Sun: 9 am - 2 am	PORTAL
Gold	Mon - Fri: 6 am - 2 am	Light Rail East
Gold	Mon - Fri: 6 am - 2 am	Student Health East
Gold	Mon - Fri: 6 am - 2 am	Fretwell South
Gold	Mon - Fri: 6 am - 2 am	Cato Hall South
Gold	Mon - Fri: 6 am - 2 am	Robinson Hall South
Gold	Mon - Fri: 6 am - 2 am	Levine Hall
Gold	Mon - Fri: 6 am - 2 am	Hunt Hall
Gold	Mon - Fri: 6 am - 2 am	Alumni Way West
Gold	Mon - Fri: 6 am - 2 am	Reece East
Gold	Mon - Fri: 6 am - 2 am	Robinson Hall North
Gold	Mon - Fri: 6 am - 2 am	Cato Hall North
Gold	Mon - Fri: 6 am - 2 am	Fretwell North
Gold	Mon - Fri: 6 am - 2 am	Klein Hall
Gold	Mon - Fri: 6 am - 2 am	Student Union West
Gold	Mon - Fri: 6 am - 2 am	Student Union Deck
Greek Village Shuttle	Fall/Spring; Mon - Fri: 7:30 am - 5:30 pm	Student Union West
Greek Village Shuttle	Fall/Spring; Mon - Fri: 7:30 am - 5:30 pm	Greek Village 1
Greek Village Shuttle	Fall/Spring; Mon - Fri: 7:30 am - 5:30 pm	Greek Village 8
Greek Village Shuttle	Fall/Spring; Mon - Fri: 7:30 am - 5:30 pm	Greek Village 4
Greek Village Shuttle	Fall/Spring; Mon - Fri: 7:30 am - 5:30 pm	Klein Hall
Shopping Shuttle	Fall/Spring; Wed - Fri: 4:45 pm - 9 pm	Levine Hall
Shopping Shuttle	Fall/Spring; Wed - Fri: 4:45 pm - 9 pm	Hunt Hall
Shopping Shuttle	Fall/Spring; Wed - Fri: 4:45 pm - 9 pm	Light Rail East
Shopping Shuttle	Fall/Spring; Wed - Fri: 4:45 pm - 9 pm	Martin Hall
Shopping Shuttle	Fall/Spring; Wed - Fri: 4:45 pm - 9 pm	Patel Brothers
Shopping Shuttle	Fall/Spring; Wed - Fri: 4:45 pm - 9 pm	Target
Shopping Shuttle	Fall/Spring; Wed - Fri: 4:45 pm - 9 pm	Harris Teeter
Football North	GAMEDAY ONLY	Football Stadium/Gate 1
Football North	GAMEDAY ONLY	Student Union East
Football North	GAMEDAY ONLY	North Deck
Football North	GAMEDAY ONLY	Light Rail West
Football South	GAMEDAY ONLY	Football Stadium/Gate 1
Football South	GAMEDAY ONLY	West Deck South
Football South	GAMEDAY ONLY	South Village Deck
Football South	GAMEDAY ONLY	Gage Undergraduate Admissions
Football South	GAMEDAY ONLY	Cato Hall North
Football South	GAMEDAY ONLY	Student Union West
Niner Paratransit	Mon - Fri: 7 am - 12 am	Prearranged Service (54 stops)
49er ColdRush	Snowdays: 9 am - 7 pm	Light Rail East
49er ColdRush	Snowdays: 9 am - 7 pm	Student Health East
49er ColdRush	Snowdays: 9 am - 7 pm	Fretwell South
49er ColdRush	Snowdays: 9 am - 7 pm	Cato Hall South
49er ColdRush	Snowdays: 9 am - 7 pm	Robinson Hall South
49er ColdRush	Snowdays: 9 am - 7 pm	Main Entrance Traffic Circle
49er ColdRush	Snowdays: 9 am - 7 pm	Robinson Hall North
49er ColdRush	Snowdays: 9 am - 7 pm	Cato Hall North
49er ColdRush	Snowdays: 9 am - 7 pm	Fretwell North
49er ColdRush	Snowdays: 9 am - 7 pm	Student Health North
49er ColdRush	Snowdays: 9 am - 7 pm	FM/PPS
49er ColdRush	Snowdays: 9 am - 7 pm	Light Rail West

=== Former Routes ===
Throughout the years, Niner Transit has offered various different shuttle and bus services. Several routes have been altered to shift changes in demand, while other routes have been created to temporarily assist in the mass transportation of students.

Route	Last Operated	Hours	Stops	Notes
Blue (Temporary)	2020	Mon - Fri: 10 am - 5 pm Sat - Sun: 11 am - 4 pm	Arcadia	Introduced as temporary routes to assist students living off campus with access to the Student Union and main campus.
Blue (Temporary)	2020	Mon - Fri: 10 am - 5 pm Sat - Sun: 11 am - 4 pm	Aspen 1 (Monument Hill Rd.)	Introduced as temporary routes to assist students living off campus with access to the Student Union and main campus.
Blue (Temporary)	2020	Mon - Fri: 10 am - 5 pm Sat - Sun: 11 am - 4 pm	Aspen 2 (Epic Run)	Introduced as temporary routes to assist students living off campus with access to the Student Union and main campus.
Blue (Temporary)	2020	Mon - Fri: 10 am - 5 pm Sat - Sun: 11 am - 4 pm	Student Union East	Introduced as temporary routes to assist students living off campus with access to the Student Union and main campus.
Orange (Temporary)	2020	Mon - Fri: 10 am - 5 pm Sat - Sun: 11 am - 4 pm	University Crossings	Introduced as temporary routes to assist students living off campus with access to the Student Union and main campus.
Orange (Temporary)	2020	Mon - Fri: 10 am - 5 pm Sat - Sun: 11 am - 4 pm	Haven 49/University Walk	Introduced as temporary routes to assist students living off campus with access to the Student Union and main campus.
Orange (Temporary)	2020	Mon - Fri: 10 am - 5 pm Sat - Sun: 11 am - 4 pm	University Village 1 (Mine Shaft Ln.)	Introduced as temporary routes to assist students living off campus with access to the Student Union and main campus.
Orange (Temporary)	2020	Mon - Fri: 10 am - 5 pm Sat - Sun: 11 am - 4 pm	University Village 2 (University Village Blvd.)	Introduced as temporary routes to assist students living off campus with access to the Student Union and main campus.
Orange (Temporary)	2020	Mon - Fri: 10 am - 5 pm Sat - Sun: 11 am - 4 pm	The Mill	Introduced as temporary routes to assist students living off campus with access to the Student Union and main campus.
Orange (Temporary)	2020	Mon - Fri: 10 am - 5 pm Sat - Sun: 11 am - 4 pm	Student Union West	Introduced as temporary routes to assist students living off campus with access to the Student Union and main campus.
Pink - A (Temporary)	2020	Mon - Fri: 10 am - 5 pm Sat - Sun: 11 am - 4 pm	49 North/Millenium One	Introduced as temporary routes to assist students living off campus with access to the Student Union and main campus.
Pink - A (Temporary)	2020	Mon - Fri: 10 am - 5 pm Sat - Sun: 11 am - 4 pm	The Edge	Introduced as temporary routes to assist students living off campus with access to the Student Union and main campus.
Pink - A (Temporary)	2020	Mon - Fri: 10 am - 5 pm Sat - Sun: 11 am - 4 pm	Student Union West	Introduced as temporary routes to assist students living off campus with access to the Student Union and main campus.
Pink - B (Temporary)	2020	Mon - Fri: 10 am - 5 pm Sat - Sun: 11 am - 4 pm	The Union	Introduced as temporary routes to assist students living off campus with access to the Student Union and main campus.
Pink - B (Temporary)	2020	Mon - Fri: 10 am - 5 pm Sat - Sun: 11 am - 4 pm	Boulevard 98	Introduced as temporary routes to assist students living off campus with access to the Student Union and main campus.
Pink - B (Temporary)	2020	Mon - Fri: 10 am - 5 pm Sat - Sun: 11 am - 4 pm	The Edge	Introduced as temporary routes to assist students living off campus with access to the Student Union and main campus.
Pink - B (Temporary)	2020	Mon - Fri: 10 am - 5 pm Sat - Sun: 11 am - 4 pm	Student Union West	Introduced as temporary routes to assist students living off campus with access to the Student Union and main campus.
Gold	2019	Mon - Fri: 6 am - 2 am	Light Rail East	Route was modified & several stops were removed or replaced
Gold	2019	Mon - Fri: 6 am - 2 am	Police/FM	Route was modified & several stops were removed or replaced
Gold	2019	Mon - Fri: 6 am - 2 am	Hickory Hall	Route was modified & several stops were removed or replaced
Gold	2019	Mon - Fri: 6 am - 2 am	Fretwell South	Route was modified & several stops were removed or replaced
Gold	2019	Mon - Fri: 6 am - 2 am	Cato Hall South	Route was modified & several stops were removed or replaced
Gold	2019	Mon - Fri: 6 am - 2 am	Robinson Hall West (South)	Route was modified & several stops were removed or replaced
Gold	2019	Mon - Fri: 6 am - 2 am	Levine Hall	Route was modified & several stops were removed or replaced
Gold	2019	Mon - Fri: 6 am - 2 am	South Village (Hunt Hall)	Route was modified & several stops were removed or replaced
Gold	2019	Mon - Fri: 6 am - 2 am	Alumni Center West	Route was modified & several stops were removed or replaced
Gold	2019	Mon - Fri: 6 am - 2 am	Foundation Building	Route was modified & several stops were removed or replaced
Gold	2019	Mon - Fri: 6 am - 2 am	Cone Deck	Route was modified & several stops were removed or replaced
Gold	2019	Mon - Fri: 6 am - 2 am	Reece East	Route was modified & several stops were removed or replaced
Gold	2019	Mon - Fri: 6 am - 2 am	Robinson Hall East (North)	Route was modified & several stops were removed or replaced
Gold	2019	Mon - Fri: 6 am - 2 am	East Deck	Route was modified & several stops were removed or replaced
Gold	2019	Mon - Fri: 6 am - 2 am	Fretwell North	Route was modified & several stops were removed or replaced
Gold	2019	Mon - Fri: 6 am - 2 am	PaTS	Route was modified & several stops were removed or replaced
Gold	2019	Mon - Fri: 6 am - 2 am	Student Union West	Route was modified & several stops were removed or replaced
Gold	2019	Mon - Fri: 6 am - 2 am	Belk Hall	Route was modified & several stops were removed or replaced
Copper	2020	Mon - Fri: 7 am - 9:15 pm	Light Rail West	Introduced to maintain access to the Foundation Building with the removal from the Gold Route
Copper	2020	Mon - Fri: 7 am - 9:15 pm	West Deck South	Introduced to maintain access to the Foundation Building with the removal from the Gold Route
Copper	2020	Mon - Fri: 7 am - 9:15 pm	Alumni Center South	Introduced to maintain access to the Foundation Building with the removal from the Gold Route
Copper	2020	Mon - Fri: 7 am - 9:15 pm	Foundation building 1	Introduced to maintain access to the Foundation Building with the removal from the Gold Route
Copper	2020	Mon - Fri: 7 am - 9:15 pm	Foundation building 2	Introduced to maintain access to the Foundation Building with the removal from the Gold Route
Copper	2020	Mon - Fri: 7 am - 9:15 pm	Alumni Center North	Introduced to maintain access to the Foundation Building with the removal from the Gold Route
Copper	2020	Mon - Fri: 7 am - 9:15 pm	Levine East	Introduced to maintain access to the Foundation Building with the removal from the Gold Route
Copper	2020	Mon - Fri: 7 am - 9:15 pm	Reece West	Introduced to maintain access to the Foundation Building with the removal from the Gold Route
Copper	2020	Mon - Fri: 7 am - 9:15 pm	West Deck North	Introduced to maintain access to the Foundation Building with the removal from the Gold Route
Copper	2020	Mon - Fri: 7 am - 9:15 pm	Student Union East	Introduced to maintain access to the Foundation Building with the removal from the Gold Route
Purple (Temporary)	2022	Mon - Fri: 11 am - 10 pm Sat - Sun: 11 am - 4 pm	Holiday Inn Charlotte University	Introduced to provide connect HRL students living in off-campus locations to main campus
Purple (Temporary)	2022	Mon - Fri: 11 am - 10 pm Sat - Sun: 11 am - 4 pm	Sonesta Select Charlotte University Research Park	Introduced to provide connect HRL students living in off-campus locations to main campus
Purple (Temporary)	2022	Mon - Fri: 11 am - 10 pm Sat - Sun: 11 am - 4 pm	South Village Deck	Introduced to provide connect HRL students living in off-campus locations to main campus
Purple (Temporary)	2022	Mon - Fri: 11 am - 10 pm Sat - Sun: 11 am - 4 pm	Fretwell North	Introduced to provide connect HRL students living in off-campus locations to main campus
Purple (Temporary)	2022	Mon - Fri: 11 am - 10 pm Sat - Sun: 11 am - 4 pm	Student Union West	Introduced to provide connect HRL students living in off-campus locations to main campus
Amtrak/Airport Holiday Shuttle	January 2023	Mon - Sun: 8 am, 11 am, 2 pm, 5 pm	Levine Hall	Offered only during Thanksgiving Break and Winter Break
Amtrak/Airport Holiday Shuttle	January 2023	Mon - Sun: 8 am, 11 am, 2 pm, 5 pm	Hunt Hall	Offered only during Thanksgiving Break and Winter Break
Amtrak/Airport Holiday Shuttle	January 2023	Mon - Sun: 8 am, 11 am, 2 pm, 5 pm	Light Rail East	Offered only during Thanksgiving Break and Winter Break
Amtrak/Airport Holiday Shuttle	January 2023	Mon - Sun: 8 am, 11 am, 2 pm, 5 pm	Martin Hall	Offered only during Thanksgiving Break and Winter Break
Amtrak/Airport Holiday Shuttle	January 2023	Mon - Sun: 8 am, 11 am, 2 pm, 5 pm	Charlotte Douglas Airport	Offered only during Thanksgiving Break and Winter Break
Amtrak/Airport Holiday Shuttle	January 2023	Mon - Sun: 8 am, 11 am, 2 pm, 5 pm	Charlotte Amtrak Station	Offered only during Thanksgiving Break and Winter Break
CASSI	December 2023	Mon - Fri: 8:30 am - 11:30 am, 1:30 pm - 4:30 pm, 5:30 pm - 8:30 pm	Student Union West	Part of an NCDOT pilot program that ran from July through December 2023. Route Vehicle was autonomous.
CASSI	December 2023	Mon - Fri: 8:30 am - 11:30 am, 1:30 pm - 4:30 pm, 5:30 pm - 8:30 pm	Student Union Deck	Part of an NCDOT pilot program that ran from July through December 2023. Route Vehicle was autonomous.
CASSI	December 2023	Mon - Fri: 8:30 am - 11:30 am, 1:30 pm - 4:30 pm, 5:30 pm - 8:30 pm	Light Rail East	Part of an NCDOT pilot program that ran from July through December 2023. Route Vehicle was autonomous.
CASSI	December 2023	Mon - Fri: 8:30 am - 11:30 am, 1:30 pm - 4:30 pm, 5:30 pm - 8:30 pm	Greek Village 1	Part of an NCDOT pilot program that ran from July through December 2023. Route Vehicle was autonomous.
CASSI	December 2023	Mon - Fri: 8:30 am - 11:30 am, 1:30 pm - 4:30 pm, 5:30 pm - 8:30 pm	Greek Village 8	Part of an NCDOT pilot program that ran from July through December 2023. Route Vehicle was autonomous.
CASSI	December 2023	Mon - Fri: 8:30 am - 11:30 am, 1:30 pm - 4:30 pm, 5:30 pm - 8:30 pm	Science Building	Part of an NCDOT pilot program that ran from July through December 2023. Route Vehicle was autonomous.
Red Express	Spring 2025	Mon - Fri: 9 am - 3 pm	Student Union East	Operated Fall & Spring semesters from 2019-2020 and 2022-2025. Operated in place of a fifth bus on the silver route.
Red Express	Spring 2025	Mon - Fri: 9 am - 3 pm	Fretwell South	Operated Fall & Spring semesters from 2019-2020 and 2022-2025. Operated in place of a fifth bus on the silver route.
Red Express	Spring 2025	Mon - Fri: 9 am - 3 pm	Fretwell North	Operated Fall & Spring semesters from 2019-2020 and 2022-2025. Operated in place of a fifth bus on the silver route.
Red Express	Spring 2025	Mon - Fri: 9 am - 3 pm	Student Union West	Operated Fall & Spring semesters from 2019-2020 and 2022-2025. Operated in place of a fifth bus on the silver route.
Red Express	Spring 2025	Mon - Fri: 9 am - 3 pm	Football Stadium/Gate 1	Operated Fall & Spring semesters from 2019-2020 and 2022-2025. Operated in place of a fifth bus on the silver route.
