= Academy Bus Lines =

Bus company in New Jersey, US

Coordinates: 40.75672°N 74.03250°W

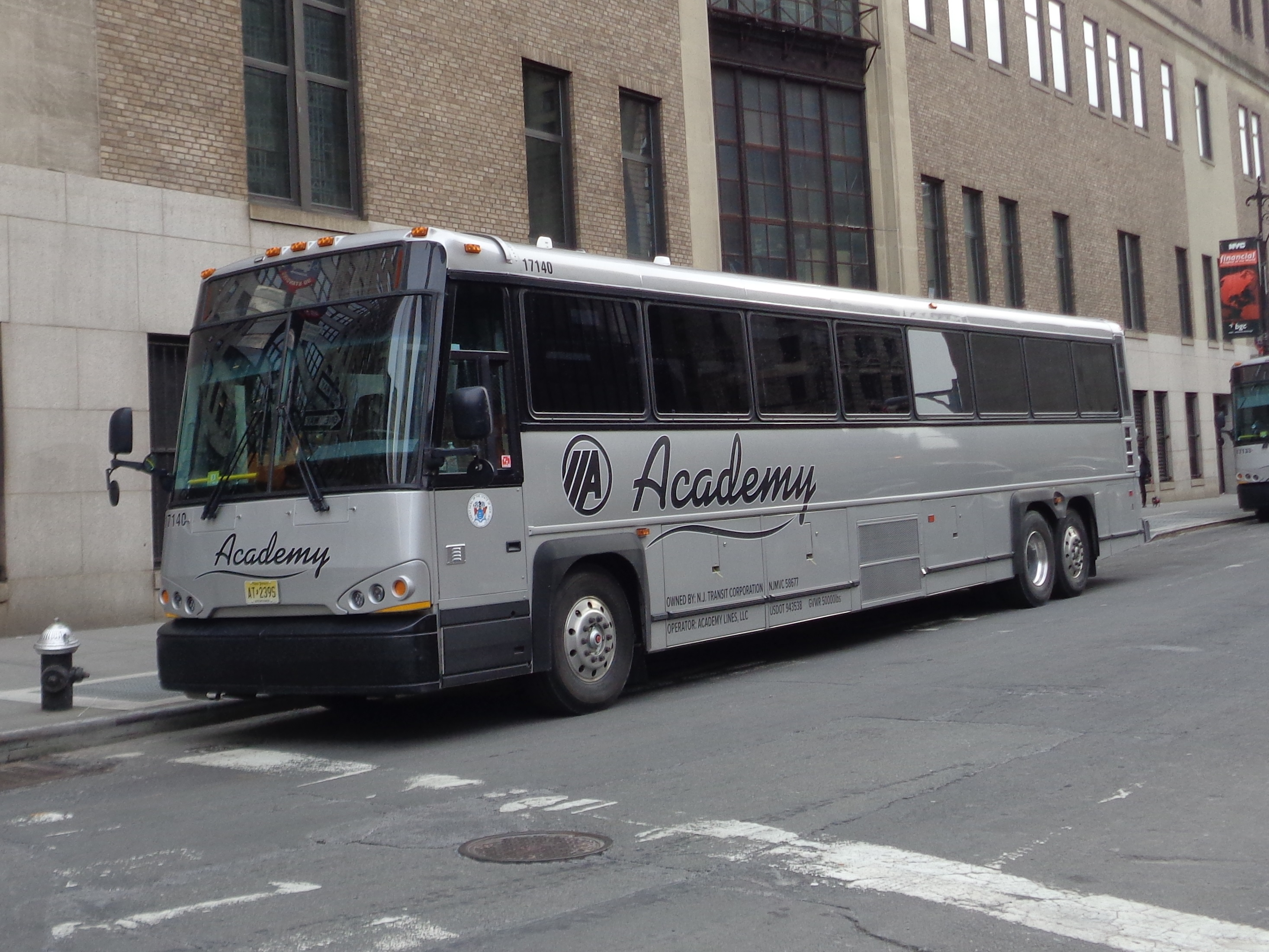
- Academy bus in the Financial District, Manhattan
- Founded: 1968
- Headquarters: Hoboken, New Jersey
- Locale: Eastern United States
- Service area: Eastern United States
- Service type: Local and commuter bus service, contract service, charter service
- Operator: Academy Lines LLC; No. 22 Hillside LLC; Academy Express LLC; Academy Bus LLC(Florida); Airport Express LLC
- Chief executive: Francis Tedesco
- Website: academybus.com

Academy Bus Lines is a bus company in New Jersey providing local bus services in northern New Jersey, line-run services to/from New York City from points in southern and central New Jersey, and contract and charter service in the eastern United States from Boston to Miami. In 2014, Academy acquired Go Buses, which currently operates bus service between Boston and Washington, D.C., and in southern Florida. On September 27, 2023, Academy acquired James River Transportation, which operates in Virginia. Academy is the third-largest motorcoach operator in the United States and Canada.

Academy's fleet consists of a variety of motor coaches, including MCI D4500 (in the process of being retired), MCI J4500, Van Hool CX35, Van Hool CX45, Van Hool C2045 motorcoaches, and Mercedes Tourrider coaches which are used for commuter and charter services. ENC Eldorado, Nova Bus LFS, Gillig, and New Flyer Industries low floor buses are used for university contracts and charters, such as Columbia Transportation. Services operated under contract to New Jersey Transit use NJT-owned (and branded) North American Bus Industries buses.

== Routes ==
=== Under contract to NJ Transit ===
Under contract to New Jersey Transit (NJT), Academy Bus operates the following routes using NJT-owned equipment. Routes are listed by county. NJT did not renew its contract with Academy for Hudson and Middlesex Counties following a fraud settlement with Academy.

==== Current ====
| County | Garage | Routes | Equipment | Notes |
|---|---|---|---|---|
| Monmouth County | Toms River | 130, 132, 136, 139 | 2017-2020 MCI D4500CT | Operates alongside NJ Transit during peak hours. Route 132 is now the 139E (139 Englishtown) |
| Ocean County | Toms River | 130, 132, 136, 139 | 2017-2020 MCI D4500CT | Operates alongside NJ Transit during peak hours. Route 132 is now the 139E (139 Englishtown) |
| Bergen County and Passaic County | Hackensack | 702, 705, 707, 709, 722, 744, 746, 748, 751, 752, 753, 755, 756, 758, 762, 772, 780 | 2012 NABI 416.15 | Was originally operated by CoachUSA Community Coach until they became bankrupt. Routes were transferred to Academy Bus on August 17, 2024. |

==== Former ====
| County | Garage | Routes | Equipment | Notes |
|---|---|---|---|---|
| Hudson County | Hoboken | 2, 10, 22, 22X, 23, 88 and 119 | 2012 NABI 416.15 | Service was taken over by Coach USA Elizabeth (ONE Bus) in June 2021. NJT took over these routes in 2022 and 2024. |
| Middlesex County | Perth Amboy | 801, 802, 803, 804, 805, 810, 811, 813, 814, 815, 817, 818, 819 and 822 | 2012 NABI 416.15 | Service was taken over by Coach USA Suburban Trails in January 2021. |
| Hudson County | Hoboken | 24 | 2008-2013 NABI 416.15 | Operated alongside NJ Transit, until NJT had enough operators. Academy temporarily operated from October to December 2023. |

=== Other contract operations ===
Under contract to Rutgers University, Academy Bus operated the campus shuttles for the New Brunswick and Piscataway campuses under a 10-year contract, until June 30, 2011, after which time First Transit Services, Inc. took over operations of the Rutgers Campus Buses. Academy has filed a lawsuit against the university over the loss of the contract. Despite the loss of shuttle operations, the company continues to provide the chartered bus operations used for tours and other events. Academy Bus took back the Rutgers University Bus contract for Newark on January 20, 2026 from Transdev. They will take the New Brunswick contract on July 1, 2026.

Academy operates Columbia Transportation for Columbia University, using both Columbia-branded transit buses and Academy-branded coaches.

Academy continues to run a separate operation in New York City for New York University and various operations for universities in southern Connecticut and around Boston. Also, Academy Bus operates long-term parking shuttles around Newark Liberty Airport under contract to the Port Authority of New York and New Jersey using Port Authority-owned and branded Orion VII buses, and using their own fleet as well.

In January 2014, Academy began operation of the SIM23 and SIM24 (formerly X23 and X24) routes between Manhattan and Staten Island, formerly operated by the now bankrupt Atlantic Express. These routes were subsidized by and operated under contract to the New York City Economic Development Corporation. On January 3, 2022, operations of the two routes transferred to the MTA, with minor changes to the operating times and routing.

As of October 1, 2014, Academy operates the MTA Maryland Commuter Express routes #410, #411, & #420 under contract to and using MTA Maryland owned buses. The #820 was also awarded by MTA Maryland and began operations on July 1, 2015.

In 2017, Academy began a contract with UNC Charlotte to operate shuttles for Niner Transit, where Academy currently operates 13 New Flyer XD-40 Buses. Academy's Contract is expected to expire June 30, 2028.

In 2021, Academy Bus Lines began operating the Tri-Rail Community bus network, where they operate a fleet of 21 ElDorado E-Z Rider II buses.

In July 2022, Academy Bus took over operations of Disney World's Cruise Line Bus route. This service was previously done by Mears Transportation, until they lost the contract in June 2022. Academy Bus also added a new Disney World Sunshine Flyer service in November 2022. As of 2021, Academy is also contracted by Disney for shuttles for their Disney College Program participants. The routes are only for Flamingo Crossing Village residents in the College Program.

As of September 27, 2023, Academy Bus acquired James River Transportation of Richmond, Virginia. As part of the acquisition, Academy took over Amtrak Thruway service between Charlottesville and Richmond that was previously operated by James River Transportation.

On June 17, 2024, Academy Bus took over EZRide from Paul Revere Transportation. Academy Bus increased service, while adding new Eldorado buses to run the service.

Academy operated under contract BestBus, which provides intercity buses between New York and the Washington area. BestBus was acquired by competitor DC Trails.

Academy formerly operated under contract to Bridj, a private, app-based, on-demand transit service, in the Greater Boston area.

Academy Bus also provides Uber shuttle bus service, as of July 2024.

The company was selected by the Virginia Department of Rail & Public Transportation to operate the Tidewater Current, a bus line of the Virginia Breeze intercity bus service in Virginia, which started operations in the spring of 2026.

On August 31, 2026, MTA Maryland would debut a new route, the 411T. This service runs from White Marsh To Trade Point Atlantic and is operated by Academy.

=== Directly controlled commuter routes ===
Academy Bus provides commuter line run service along several routes from Burlington, Mercer, Middlesex, Monmouth, and Ocean counties in New Jersey.

The full route is shown for each except for branching. Unless otherwise noted, passengers are carried to and from New York only.

| Route | Terminals | | | Via | Notes |
|---|---|---|---|---|---|
| Line 300 | New York; Port Authority Bus Terminal | ↔ | East Windsor; Windsor Heights Shopping Center | New Jersey Turnpike; Applegarth Road; Franklin Street; Stockton Street | Local passengers carried between East Windsor and Monroe.; Full-time service. Off-peak service operated by Suburban Trails.; Most service continues on to East Midtown during the AM rush only. |
| Line 300 | New York; Port Authority Bus Terminal | ← AM ---- → PM | Plainsboro; Town Center | New Jersey Turnpike; Plainsboro Road | Peak service only.; Clearbrook served daily on the East Windsor service.; Most service continues on to East Midtown during the AM rush only. |
| Line 300 | New York; Port Authority Bus Terminal | ← AM ---- → PM | Jamesburg; The Ponds, Concordia, and Whittingham | New Jersey Turnpike; Applegarth Road; Prospect Plains Road | Peak service only.; Clearbrook served daily on the East Windsor service.; Most service continues on to East Midtown during the AM rush only. |
| Sayreville | New York; East Midtown via 5/Madison Avenues | ← AM ---- → PM | Sayreville; Winding Woods | Garden State Parkway; Main Street; Washington Road; Bordentown Avenue | Peak service only. |
| Sayreville | New York; Wall Street area | ← AM ---- → PM | Sayreville; Harbor Club | Weekday service only. | Peak service only. |
| Route 9^{1} | New York; Wall Street area | ← AM ---- → PM | Lakewood Bus Terminal | Route 9 | Peak service only.; During the height of rush hour, three services operate: Old Bridge to Union Hill Road only.; Gordon's Corner to Lakewood.; Jackson to Lakewood. |
| Shore Points | New York; Port Authority Bus Terminal | ↔ | Point Pleasant Beach; Railroad station | Garden State Parkway; Lincroft Park-Ride (Exit 109); Route 35; Ocean Avenue; Route 71 | Via Chesequeake and PNC Bank Arts Center park-rides.; Local passengers are carried between Asbury Park and Lincroft.; Wall Street service operates during peak hours only.; Weekday midday service does not travel south of Asbury Park.; Weekend service does not travel south of Ocean Grove.; Jersey Shore Premium Outlets service also interlined on both weekdays and weekends to operate via Cheesequake and Lincroft. |
| Shore Points | New York; Wall Street area | ← AM ---- → PM | Point Pleasant Beach; Railroad station | Garden State Parkway; Lincroft Park-Ride (Exit 109); Route 35; Ocean Avenue; Route 71 | Via Chesequeake and PNC Bank Arts Center park-rides.; Local passengers are carried between Asbury Park and Lincroft.; Wall Street service operates during peak hours only.; Weekday midday service does not travel south of Asbury Park.; Weekend service does not travel south of Ocean Grove.; Jersey Shore Premium Outlets service also interlined on both weekdays and weekends to operate via Cheesequake and Lincroft. |
| Route 36 | New York; Port Authority Bus Terminal | ↔ | Long Branch; Railroad station | Garden State Parkway; Route 36 | Via Airport Plaza in Hazlet and Chesequeake Park-Ride.; Local passengers are carried between Hazlet and Long Branch.; Wall Street service operates during peak hours only. |
| Route 36 | New York; Wall Street area | ← AM ---- → PM | | Garden State Parkway; Route 36 | Via Airport Plaza in Hazlet and Chesequeake Park-Ride.; Local passengers are carried between Hazlet and Long Branch.; Wall Street service operates during peak hours only. |
| Route 35 | New York; Port Authority Bus Terminal | ← AM ---- → PM | Red Bank; Route 35 and Navesink River Road | Garden State Parkway; Route 35 | Peak service only.; Via Airport Plaza in Hazlet and Chesequeake Park-Ride. |
| Parkway Express | New York; Port Authority Bus Terminal | ← AM ---- → PM | Forked River; Park and Ride | Garden State Parkway; CR 549 (some trips) | Peak service only.; Also serves Jersey City.; Some lower Manhattan service operates via Jersey City.; Weekday Midday service from Monmouth Service Area, Lincroft and Cheesequake operated as part of their Manchester-Jackson service.; See Note 2 below for Toms River and Route 549 service. |
| Parkway Express | New York; Wall Street area | ← AM ---- → PM | | | Peak service only.; Also serves Jersey City.; Some lower Manhattan service operates via Jersey City.; Weekday Midday service from Monmouth Service Area, Lincroft and Cheesequake operated as part of their Manchester-Jackson service.; See Note 2 below for Toms River and Route 549 service. |
| Westampton | New York; Port Authority Bus Terminal | ↔ | Willingboro Van Sciver Parkway (peak); Westampton Exit 5 park-ride (full-time) | New Jersey Turnpike; Exit 5; Mount Holly Road; Sunset Road | Wall Street via Jersey City service operates during peak hours only.; AM rush service to midtown continues to East Midtown.; Willingboro served during peak hours only. |
| Westampton | New York; Wall Street area | ← AM ---- → PM | Willingboro Van Sciver Parkway (peak); Westampton Exit 5 park-ride (full-time) | New Jersey Turnpike; Exit 5; Mount Holly Road; Sunset Road | Wall Street via Jersey City service operates during peak hours only.; AM rush service to midtown continues to East Midtown.; Willingboro served during peak hours only. |

NOTES:

1. Route 9 service via Academy is provided to lower Manhattan only (except for service via Jackson, which is available to midtown Manhattan). Route 9 service to midtown (except Jackson service) is provided on the 139 full-time.
2. Toms River and Route 549 service via Academy is only provided to lower Manhattan. Toms River service to midtown Manhattan is provided on the 137 line full-time.
3. All service via the Garden State Parkway (except for Route 9) operates via the Cheesequake park and ride. Shore Points and Parkway Express services also stop at the PNC Bank Arts Center.

=== Casino line runs ===
Academy Bus operates several regularly scheduled line services from points in the New York metropolitan area to and from casinos in Atlantic City, Yonkers, and Connecticut, with service to the Port Authority Bus Terminal operated in partnership with Coach USA as a Megabus service, the M25 (buses carry Academy markings).

=== Go Buses ===
Academy Bus runs an intercity bus common carrier service under the "Go Buses" brand, servicing the Northeast United States from Boston to Washington, D.C.. Go Buses markets its service with amenities such as free Wi-Fi, electrical outlets, and a free bottle of water upon boarding, along with a frequent rider rewards program. Offering tickets as low as $5 per one-way trip, Go Buses competes with other low-cost intercity bus services, such as Megabus, BoltBus, and various Chinatown bus lines. Academy Bus acquired Go Buses in 2014.

== Facilities ==
As of March 2026, Academy Bus Lines manages 25 locations along the East Coast in order to facilitate its Scheduled, Charter and Contract Service operations.

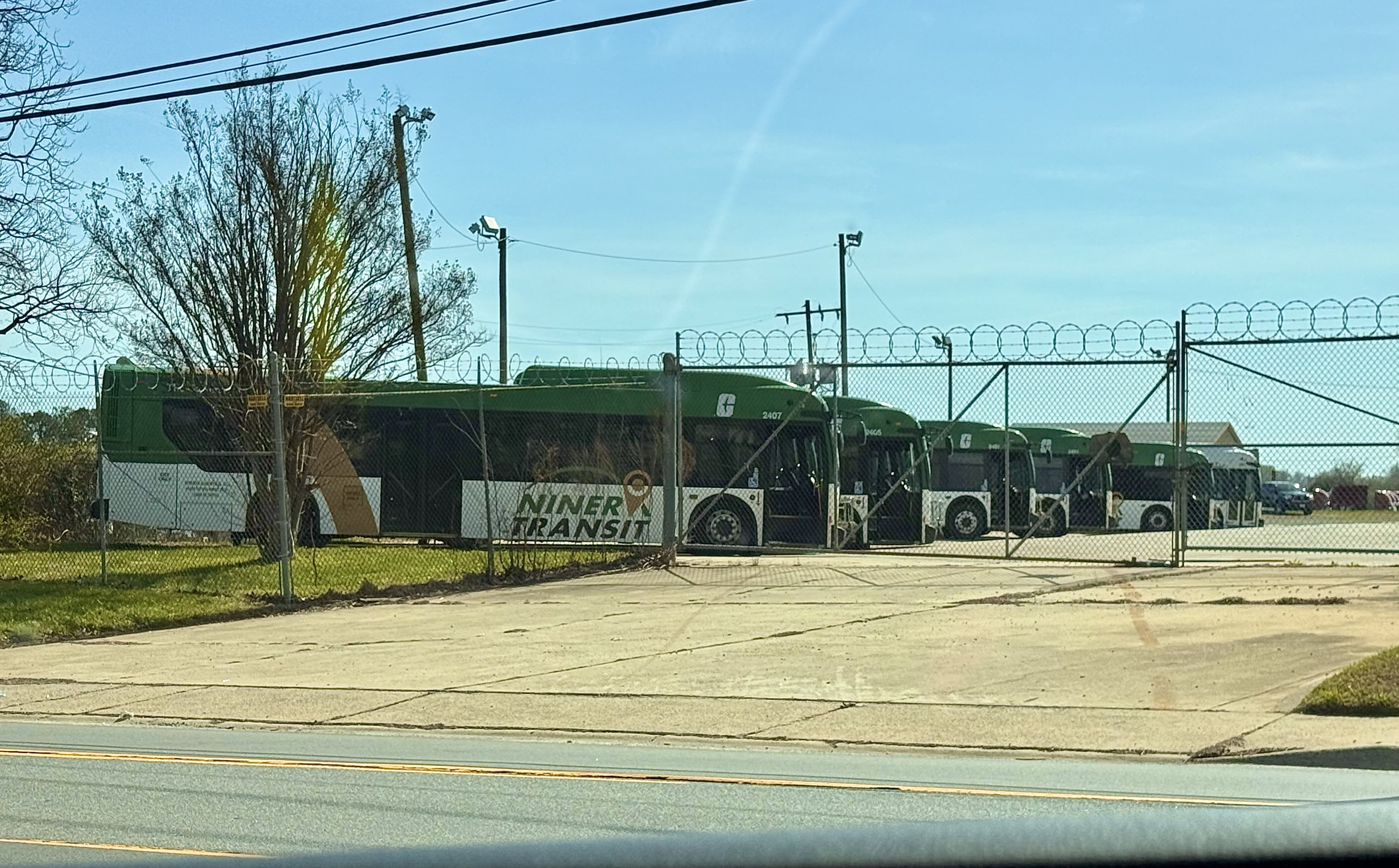
UNC Charlotte Niner Transit Buses located at the Academy Bus Garage in Charlotte, North Carolina

=== Connecticut ===
==== Bridgeport ====
- Address: 114 River Street, Bridgeport, CT 06604
- Services Offered: Charter

=== Florida ===
==== Fort Lauderdale ====
- Address: 4160 Ravenswood Road, Fort Lauderdale, FL 33312
- Services Offered: Charter & Contract (Miami Hurry' Canes Shuttle)

==== Jacksonville ====
- Address: 3501 West Beaver Street, Jacksonville, FL 32254
- Services Offered: Charter

==== Orlando ====
- Address: 1155 Elboc Way, Winter Garden, FL 34787
- Services Offered: Charter & Contract (Disney College Shuttle)

==== Tampa ====
- Address: 12301 40th Street North Clearwater, FL 33762
- Services Offered: Charter

==== West Palm Beach ====
- Address: 6575 Southern Blvd, West Palm Beach, FL 33413
- Services Offered: Charter & Contract (Tri-Rail Buses)

=== Georgia ===
==== Atlanta ====
- Address: 3535 Bestfriend Road, Atlanta, GA 30554
- Services Offered: Charter

=== Maryland ===
==== Baltimore ====
- Address: 201 Frankfurst Ave, Baltimore, MD 21225
- Services Offered: Charter & Contract (Johns Hopkins University Campus Shuttle)

==== Capitol Heights ====
- Address: 1700 Rochelle Ave, Capitol Heights, MD 20743
- Services Offered: Charter & Scheduled

=== Massachusetts ===
==== Boston ====
- Address: 531 Pond Street, Braintree, MA 02184
- Services Offered: Charter & Contract (EZRide)

==== Chelsea ====
- Address: 333 3rd Street, Chelsea, MA 02150
- Services Offered: Charter & Contract (BU Shuttle & Logan Express Black Bay Shuttle

=== New Jersey ===
==== Corporate Headquarters ====
- Address: 111 Paterson Ave, Hoboken, NJ 07030
- Services Offered: N/A (office)

==== Body Rite ====
- Address: 57 County Ave, Secaucus, NJ 07094
- Services Offered: Body Shop, Charter & Contract (Newark Airport)

==== Hackensack Garage ====
- Address: 600 River St., Hackensack, NJ 07601
- Services Offered: NJ Transit

==== Hoboken ====
- Address: 1515 Jefferson St, Hoboken, NJ 07030
- Services Offered: Scheduled, Charter & Contract (NYU Shuttle, Columbia University Shuttle, Newark Airport)

==== Leonardo ====
- Address: 890 State Route 36, Leonardo, NJ 07737
- Services Offered: Scheduled, Charter & Contract (NJ Transit)

==== Newark Airport ====
- Address: 620 Division Street, Suite J, Elizabeth, NJ 07201
- Services Offered: N/A (office)

==== Perth Amboy ====
- Address: 440 Florida Grove Rd, Perth Amboy, NJ 08861, USA
- Services Offered: Charter & Contract (Rutgers Campus Buses)

==== Toms River ====
- Address: 2253 Route 9, Toms River, NJ 08755
- Services Offered: Scheduled, Charter & Contract (NJ Transit)

==== Westhampton ====
- Address: 6 Western Drive, Westampton, NJ 08060
- Services Offered: Scheduled, Charter & Contract (NJ Transit)

=== North Carolina ===
==== Charlotte ====
- Address: 1251 W. Craighead Road, Charlotte, NC 28206
- Services Offered: Charter & Contract (Niner Transit)

==== Durham ====
- Address: 2020 South Briggs Ave, Durham, NC 27703
- Services Offered: Charter

=== Rhode Island ===
==== West Warwick ====
- Address: 76 Industrial Lane, West Warwick, RI 02893
- Services Offered: Charter

=== Virginia ===
==== Bristow ====
- Address: 7920 Gainsford Court, Bristow, VA 20136
- Services Offered: Charter

==== Norfolk ====
- Address: 33141 Azalea Garden Rd, Norfolk, VA 23513
- Services Offered: Charter

==== Richmond ====
- Address: 915 N. Allen Avenue, Richmond, VA 23220
- Services Offered: Charter

== Corporate structure ==
Academy Bus, LLC is a limited liability corporation and holding company that owns four operating companies: Academy Lines, LLC, Academy Express, LLC, Airport Express LLC, and No. 22 Hillside Corporation.

== Gallery ==
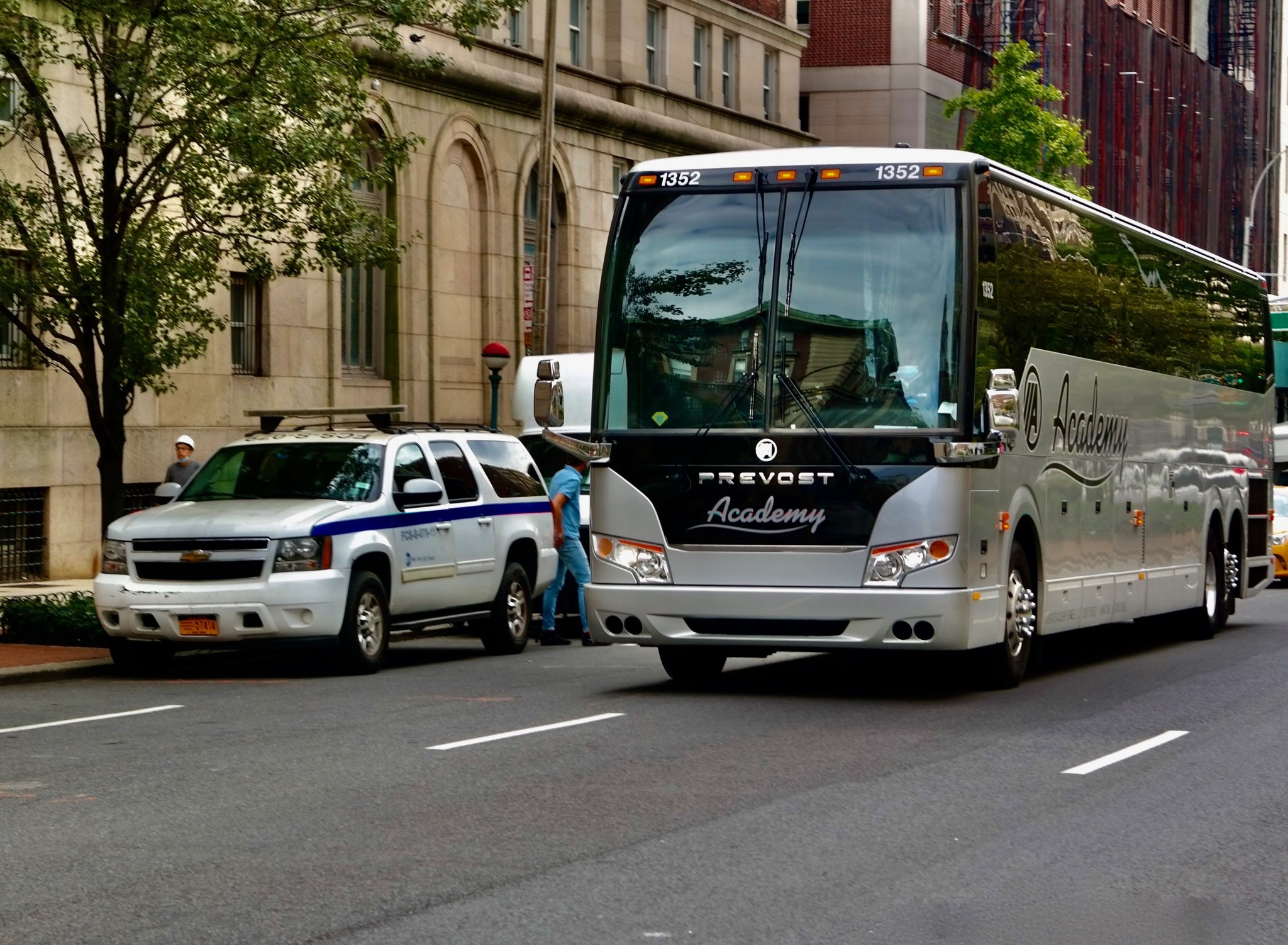
A 2019-model Prévost H3-45 in Columbia Commuter Shuttle service

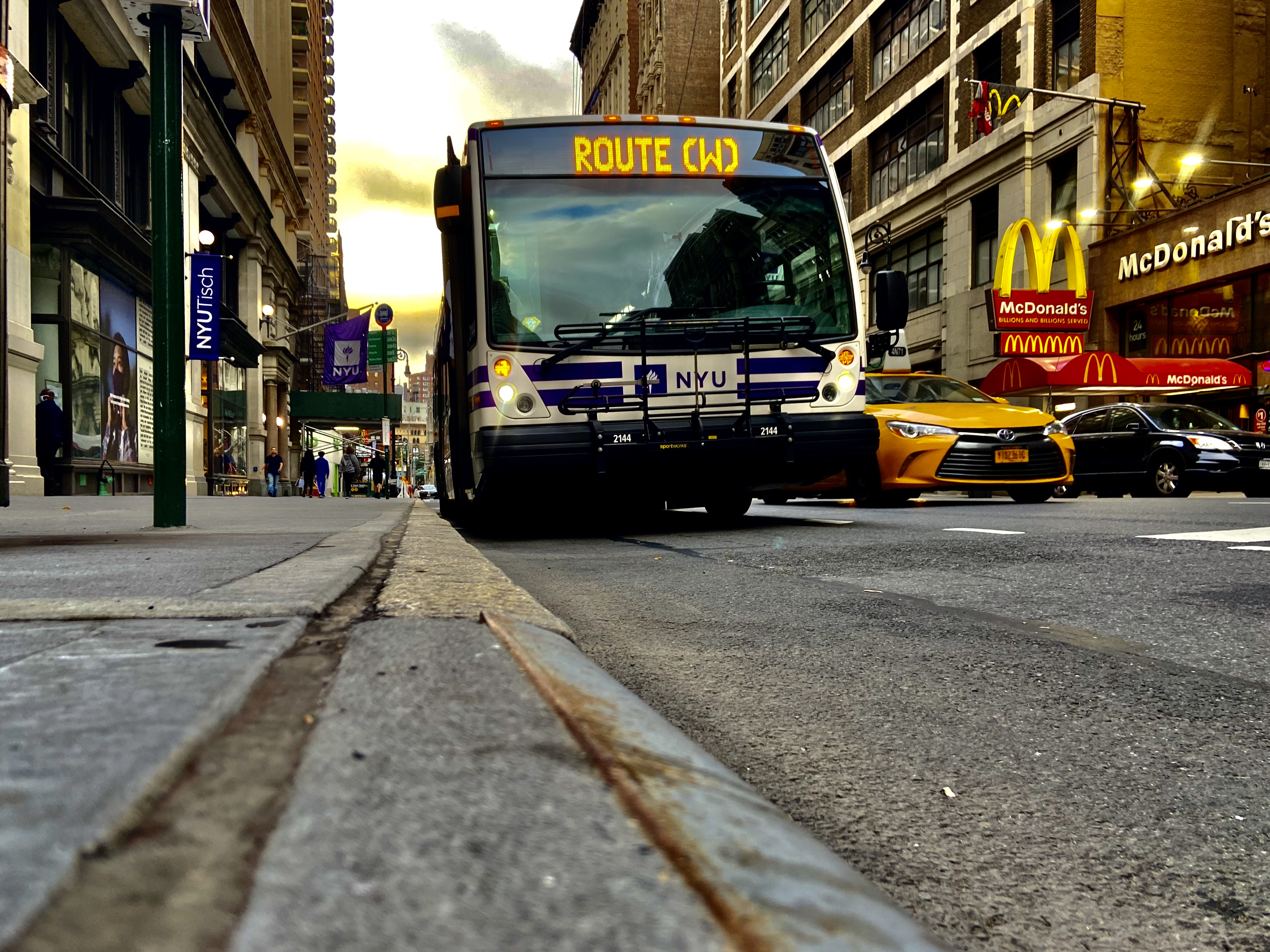
An Academy-owned 2017-model Nova Bus LFS in NYU Transportation service

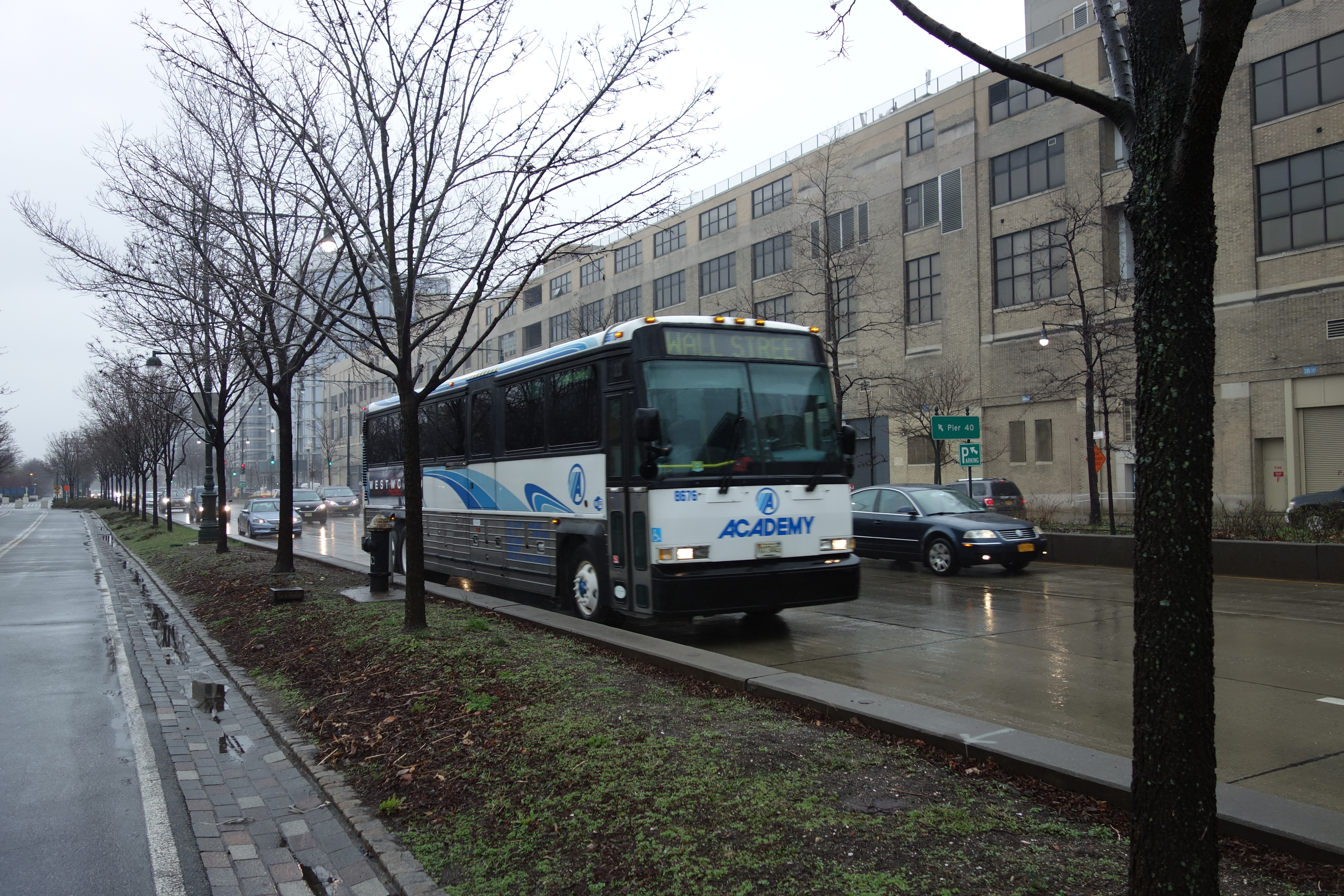
An NJT-owned, Academy-operated 2003-model MCI D4000 Commuter Coach in Lower Manhattan. This bus has since retired.

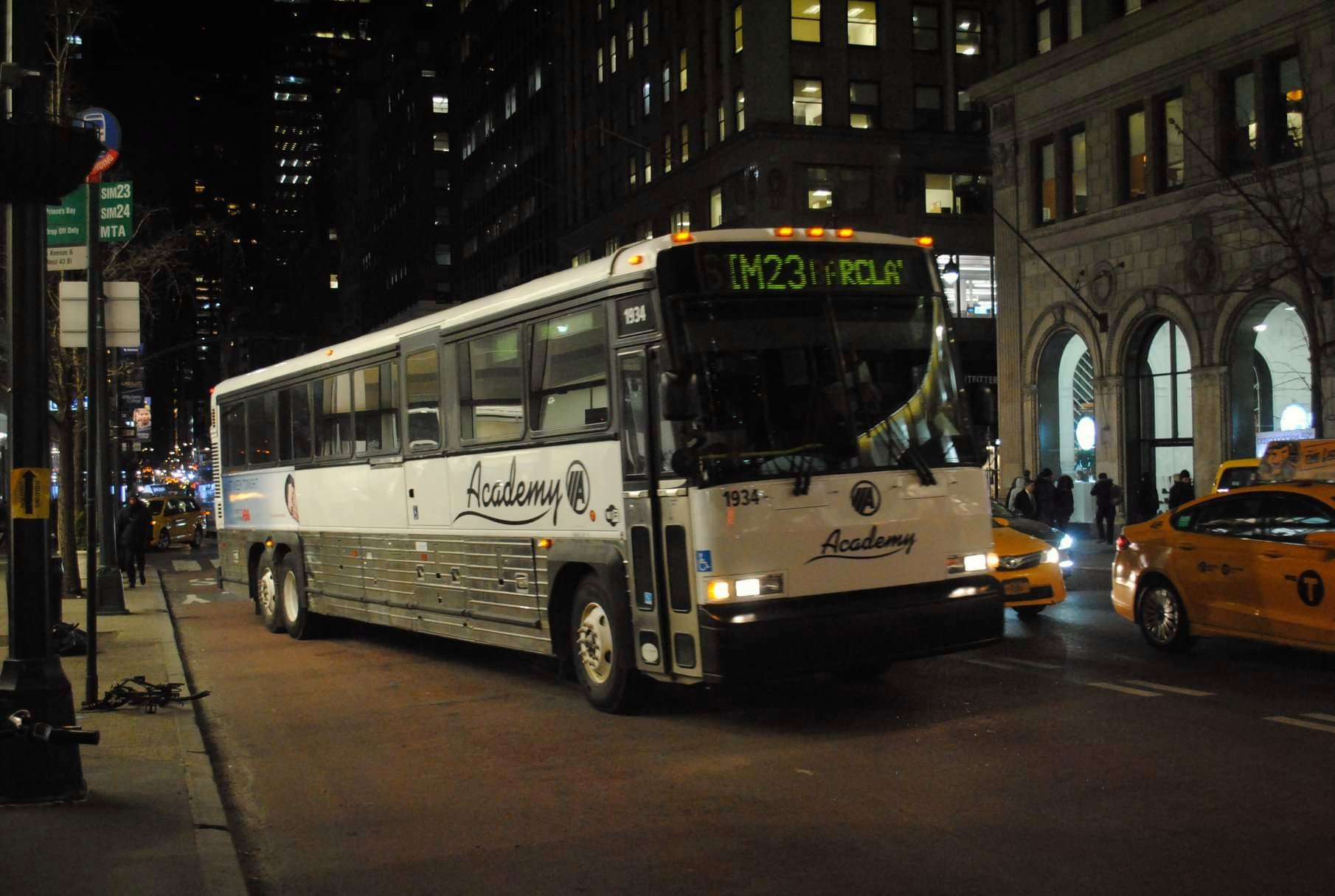
A 2003-model MCI D4500 Commuter Coach on the SIM23 Staten Island-Manhattan express route, a formerly Academy-operated route. This bus has since been replaced with Van Hool CX45 and C2045 models. The route was given to MTA NYCT in 2022.

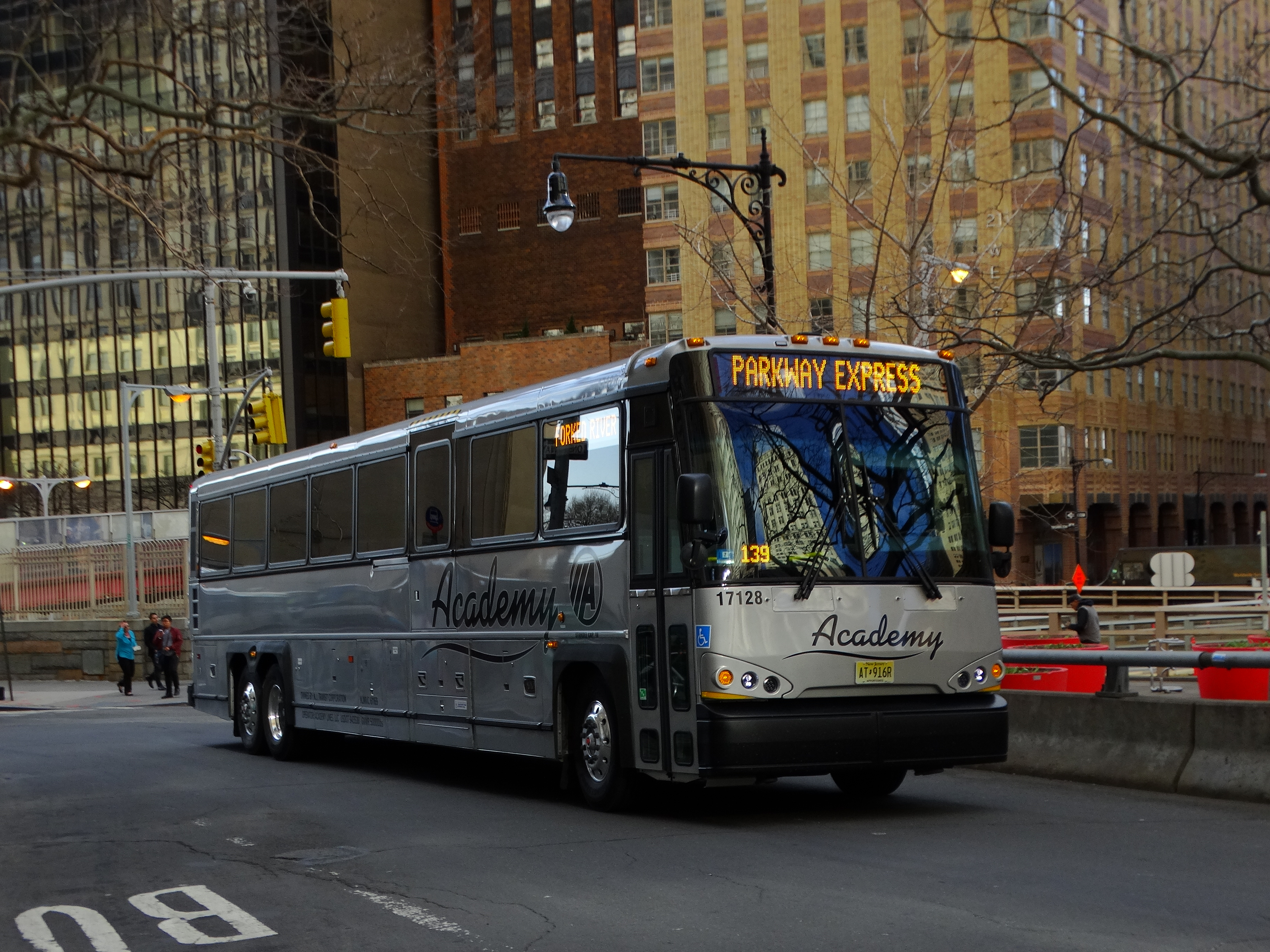
A 2017-model MCI D4500CT Commuter Coach operating on the Parkway Express route that goes to the Jersey Shore

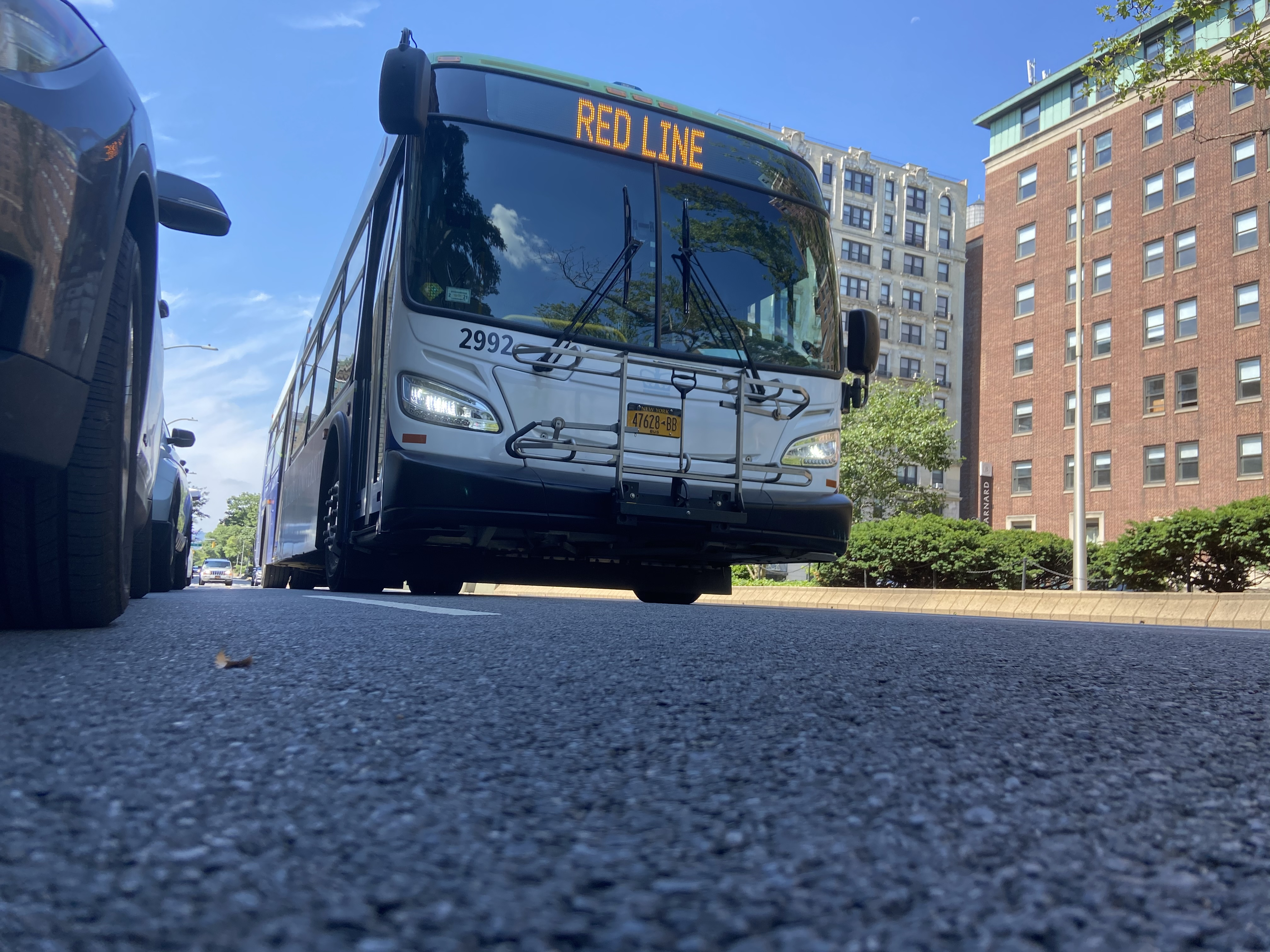
A 2018-model New Flyer XE40 Xcelsior CHARGE electric bus operating for Columbia Transportation

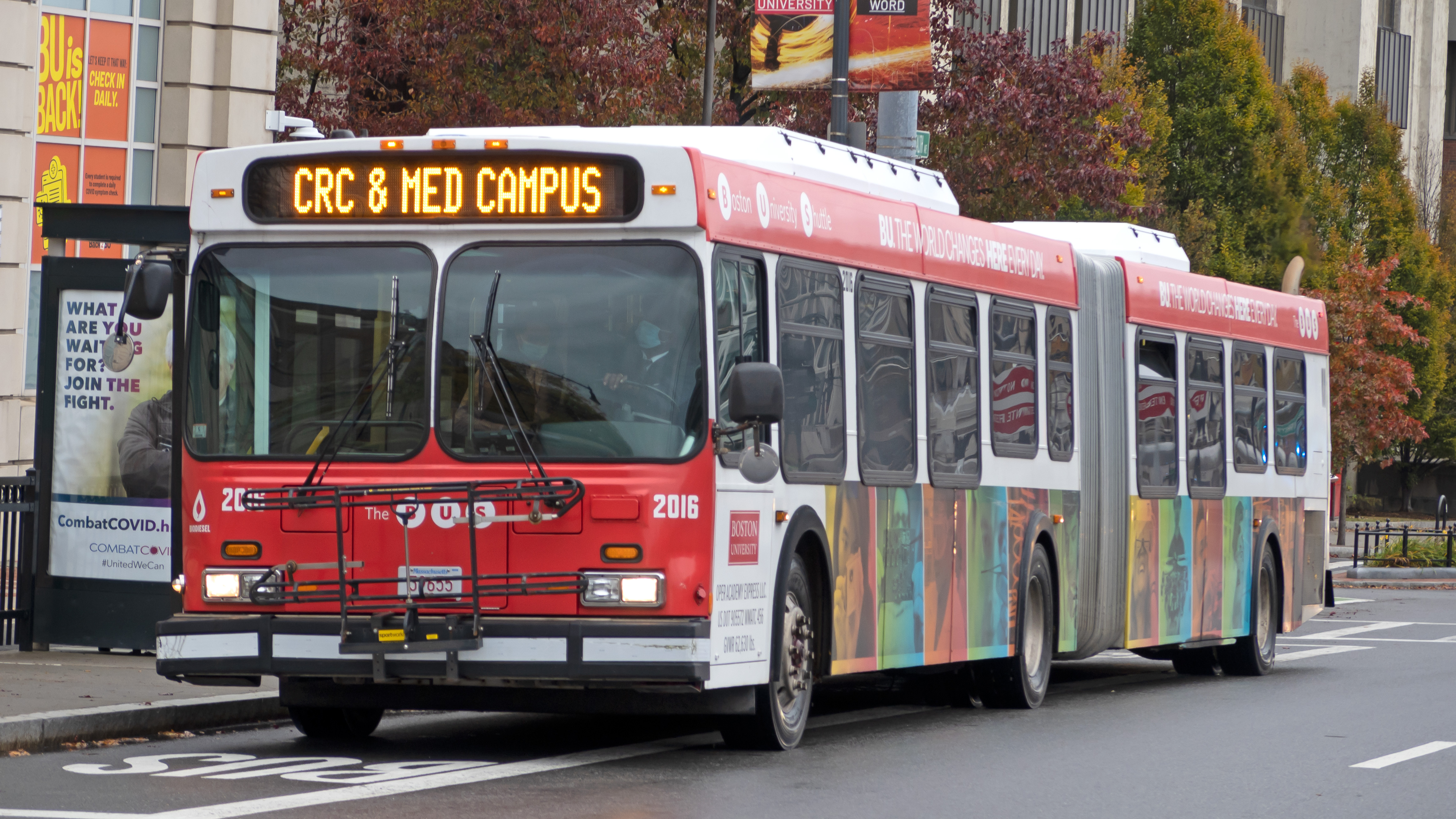
A New Flyer D60LF in Boston University's CRC & MED Campus shuttle service

== See also ==
- Number 22 Hillside LLC/Corp
