= Rutgers Campus Buses =

Bus service used by students at Rutgers University in the US

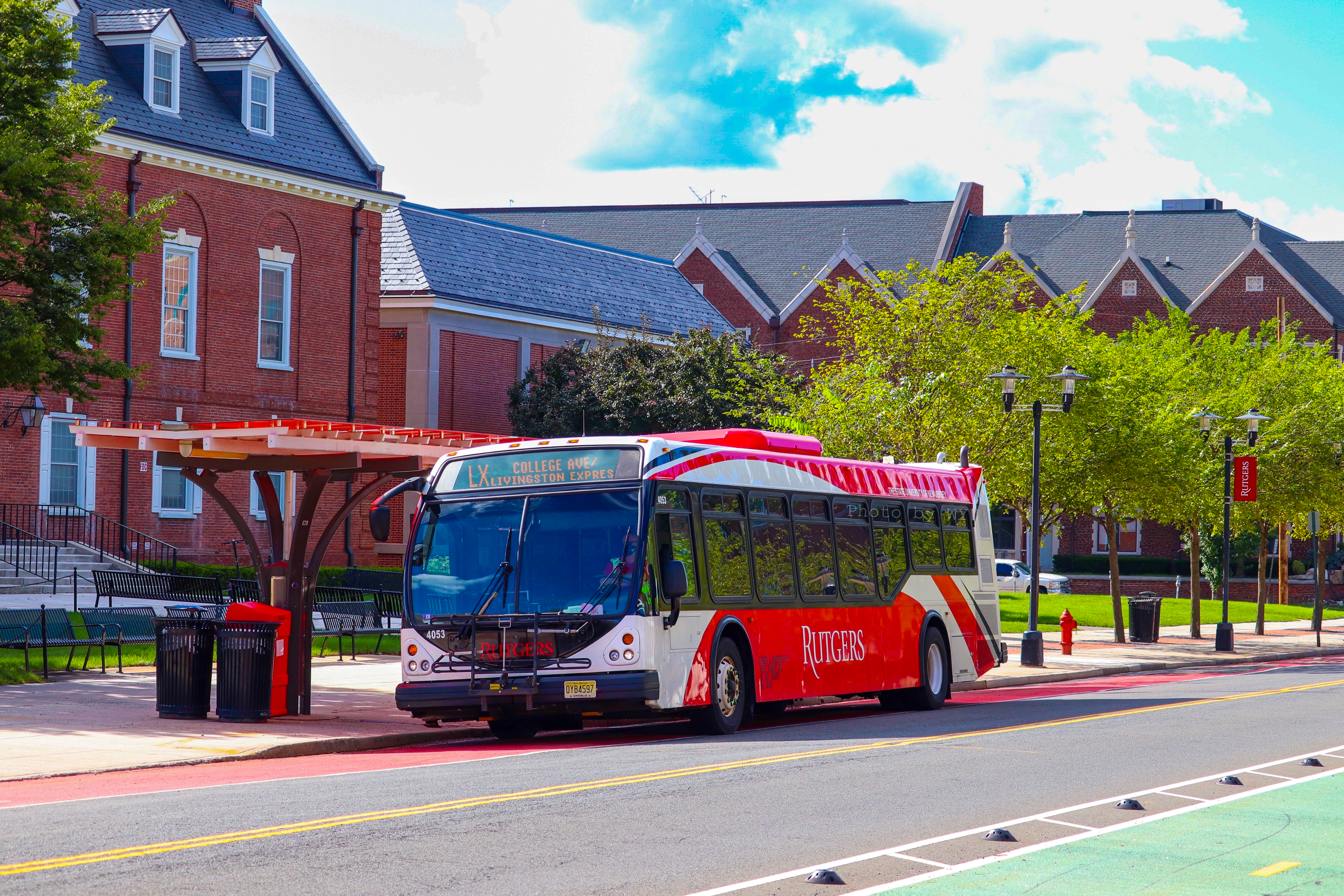
- Rutgers Bus #4053 on Route LX
- Founded: 1961
- Locale: Rutgers University
- Service area: New Brunswick/Piscataway, Newark, and Camden
- Service type: University bus system
- Routes: 15 (New Brunswick); 4 (Newark); 1 (Camden)
- Fleet: 84
- Daily ridership: 85,000 Daily (70,000 New Brunswick; 9,000 Newark; 6,000 Camden)
- Annual ridership: 25,550,000
- Fuel type: Diesel; Electric; Gasoline (Ford cutaways)
- Operator: Academy Bus Lines
- Chief executive: Henry X. Velez
- Assistant Director: John Karakoglou
- Website: Rutgers Campus Buses

Rutgers Campus Buses are a zero-fare bus service used by students at Rutgers University campuses. It is the second-largest bus service in New Jersey after NJ Transit, and one of the largest university bus systems in the United States. The service is provided by Academy Bus Lines year-round, including weekends, breaks, holidays, and events. Late night shuttle service for students is provided by Rutgers Department of Transportation Services (known as the "Knight Mover") when the New Brunswick campus transit system is not in service. Academy Bus Lines took over Newark service on January 20, 2026, and began operation at New Brunswick and Camden Campus on July 1, 2026. The contract will remain until June 30, 2046.

== History ==
From July 1, 2001, to June 30, 2011, Rutgers New Brunswick Campus bus service was provided by Academy Bus Lines. Prior to that, Suburban Transit was the operator.

Rutgers began to install new bus shelters in the summer of 2010. The new shelters incorporate red roofs to cast a red tone on the sidewalk, showcasing university colors.

Director Jack Molenaar announced that the L route would be discontinued due to budget cuts, effective 28 August 2010. Molenaar called the bus a "relic" and said it was "slowest and most underutilized" of the bus routes. There was significant opposition to the move, especially from graduate students and Highland Park residents who had already made housing arrangements expecting the bus to be there. After 600 people signed an online petition calling for its reinstitution, a temporary LXc route was created for the 2010–11 school year, stopping at Cedar Lane every 30 minutes. A second bus was later added to shorten wait times to 15 minutes. In addition, the three weekend buses (A, EE, L) were reorganized into two all campus loop buses (Weekend 1 and Weekend 2).

On October 21, 2010, First Transit was awarded a 5-year contract with an option to extend up to 15 years for the operation of New Brunswick Campus shuttle system. The main reason cited for the switch is cost. First Transit will refurbish existing buses and supply new ones for a total of 50 buses featured automatic stop announcements, whereas now drivers may or may not announce stops.

On December 10, 2010, Academy filed a lawsuit against the university over the loss of the contract. Despite the loss of shuttle operations, the company continues to provide the chartered bus operations used for tours and football games.

First Transit expanded their bus service to the Newark Campus beginning September 1, 2014; to Camden Campus since September 1, 2019. The new Rutgers-logo fleet of buses utilize the NextBus system and real-time status is available via the official Rutgers app. In 2018, Rutgers replaced the NextBus system with TransLoc. After Transdev completed the acquisition of First Transit on March 7, 2023, all current First Transit contracts were transferred to Transdev. Starting August 2, 2023, Rutgers replaced TransLoc with Passio Go! as the new tracker for Rutgers buses. This app includes features such as bus capacity, how long the bus will take at each stop, dwelling features, the bus number, while tracking each bus.

On January 20, 2026, Academy Bus Lines began operations at Newark campus, providing some new and refurbished vehicles for use. On July 1, 2026, they began operations for the New Brunswick/Piscataway and Camden Campuses, providing more vehicles and purchasing some of the former fleet from Transdev.

=== Alternative plans ===
Several times over the past decade, it has been suggested that the bus system be partially or fully replaced with bus rapid transit (BRT), monorail, or light rail. Closing College Avenue to non-bus motor vehicle traffic was also proposed, but indefinitely canceled in February 2010, due to excessive costs. Current plans are for incorporating the Rutgers bus system into the proposed New Brunswick Bus Rapid Transit, which would be centered on the New Brunswick Station near the intersection of Route 18 and Route 27.

== Routes ==
=== New Brunswick Campus ===
There are currently 12 routes on weekdays, 2 routes on weekends and winter/spring/summer breaks, and 1 route on holidays for the New Brunswick Campus.

==== Weekday routes ====
Rutgers New Brunswick Bus System Map - Weekdays - Fall 2025

As of May 3, 2026.

Name	Route	Stops	Hours of Operation	Notes
A	College Avenue/Busch	College Avenue Student Center → The Yard → Student Activities Center → Stadium West Lot → Hill Center (North) → Science Buildings → Busch Student Center → Werblin Recreation Center	7:00AM–9:20PM (Mon-Fri)	
B	Livingston/Busch	Livingston Student Center → Quads → Hill Center (North) → Science Buildings → Busch Student Center → Livingston Plaza	7:00AM–10:40PM (Mon-Fri)	
B/L	Livingston/Busch	Jersey Mike's Arena → Livingston Student Center → Quads → Busch Student Center → Rodkin Academic Center → Stadium West Lot → Hill Center (North) → Science Buildings	6:00AM–2:30AM (Mon-Fri)	
C	Busch Commuter Loop	Stadium West Lot → Hill Center (North) → Allison Road Classroom Building → Hill Center (South)	7:30AM–10:00PM (Mon-Thurs) 7:30AM–7:30PM (Fri)	
EE	College Avenue/Douglass-Cook via George Street	College Avenue Student Center → The Yard → SoCam Apartments (SB) → Red Oak Lane → Lipman Hall → Biel Road → Henderson Apartments → Gibbons → College Hall → SoCam Apartments (NB) → Student Activities Center	6:00AM–2:54AM (Mon-Wed) 6:00AM–3:41AM (Thurs-Fri)	
F	College Avenue/Douglass Express via Route 18	Red Oak Lane → Lipman Hall → College Hall → Student Activities Center → The Yard	7:00AM–9:24PM (Mon-Fri)	
H	College Avenue/Busch	College Avenue Student Center → The Yard → Student Activities Center → Werblin Recreation Center → Busch Student Center → Allison Road Classroom Building → Hill Center (South) → Stadium West Lot	6:00AM–3:16AM (Mon-Wed) 6:00AM–4:00AM (Thurs-Fri)	
HELIX	Helix Shuttle (RBHS/HELIX)	RBHS → HELIX H-1	7:00AM–6:00PM (Mon-Fri)	A pilot program which began on July 20, 2026.
KB	Knightbridge Shuttle (College Avenue/Knightsbridge Road)	The Yard → 33 Knightsbridge Road	7:00AM–7:00PM (Mon-Fri)	A pilot program which began on Feb 20, 2026.
LX	College Avenue/Livingston Express	College Avenue Student Center → The Yard → Student Activities Center → Livingston Plaza → Livingston Student Center → Quads	6:00AM–2:46AM (Mon-Wed) 6:00AM–3:46AM (Thurs-Fri)	
REXB	Douglass/Busch	Red Oak Lane → Lipman Hall → College Hall → Hill Center (North) → Allison Road Classroom Building → Hill Center (South)	7:00AM–11:18PM (Mon-Fri)	
REXL	Douglass/Livingston	Red Oak Lane → Lipman Hall → College Hall → Livingston Plaza → Livingston Student Center	7:00AM–11:22PM (Mon-Fri)	

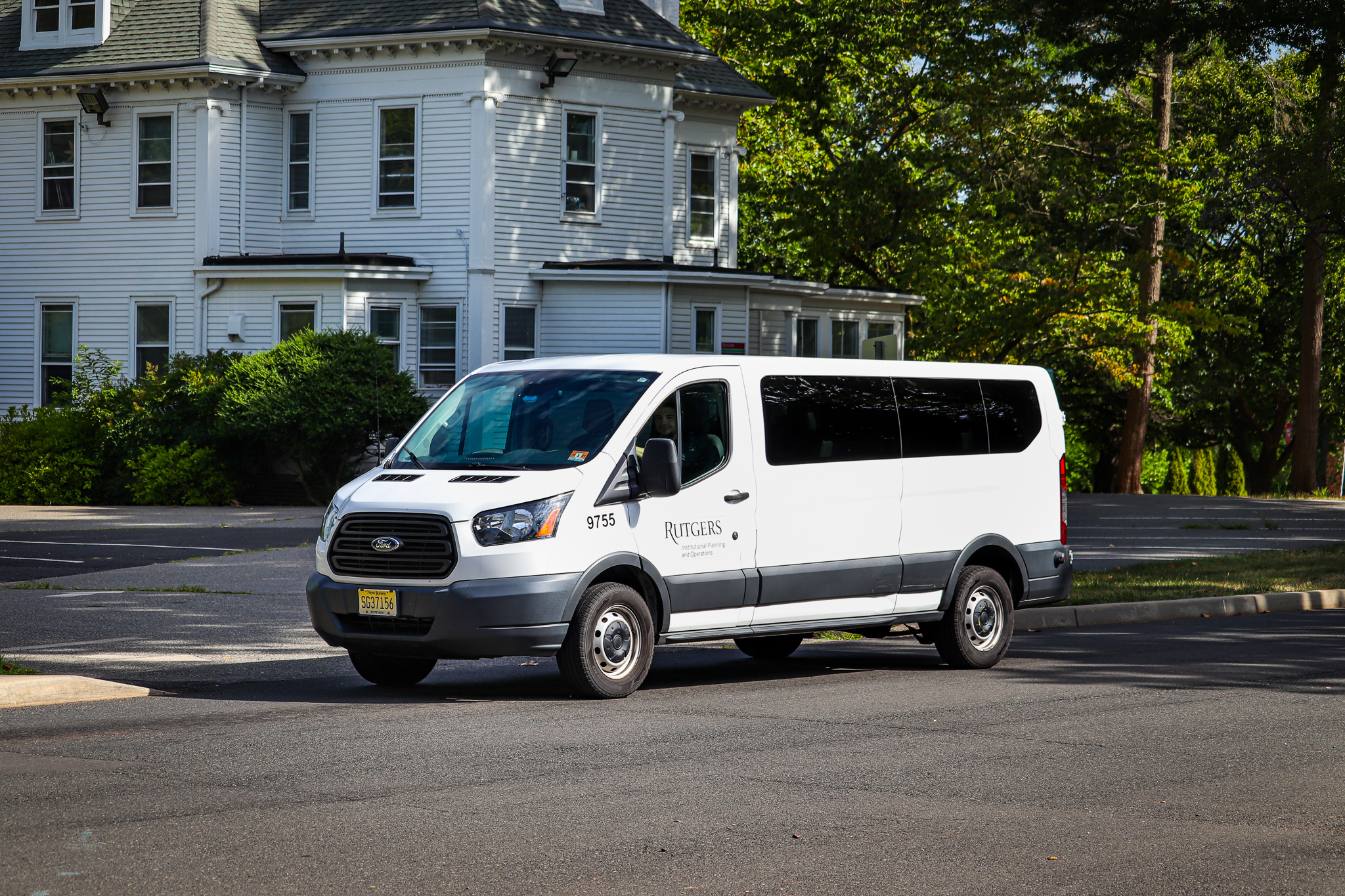
Knight Mover operated by RUDOTS

The Knight Mover operates when weekday buses stop running; it runs Monday through Thursday from 3:00AM to 6:00AM.

==== Weekends and breaks ====
Rutgers New Brunswick Bus System Map - Weekends - Fall 2025

In spring 2021, a variation of the weekend routes was introduced. They are essentially an express version of the regular weekend routes, stopping only at the stops served by the color routes on each campus. In fall 2021, a revised version of previous letter routes with redundant stops eliminated was introduced. Weekend routes were also based on revised letter routes.

Name	Route	Hours of Operation	Notes
Weekend 1	College Ave → Busch → Livingston → Douglass-Cook	4:00AM–6:00AM (FRI) 4:00AM (SAT)-3:00AM (MON)	Known as Summer 1 during summer break, Winter Break 1 during winter break, and Spring Break 1 during spring break.
Weekend 2	College Ave → Douglass-Cook → Livingston → Busch	4:00AM–6:00AM (FRI) 4:00AM (SAT)-3:00AM (MON)	Known as Summer 2 during summer break, Winter Break 2 during winter break, and Spring Break 2 during spring break.
All Campuses	College Ave → Busch → Livingston → Douglass-Cook	10:00AM–7:00PM	Identical to the Weekend 1 route, operates on weekends during breaks and during holidays (Thanksgiving, Holiday Recess, Memorial Day, Juneteenth, and Fourth of July).

==== Special event shuttles ====
Buses for the following routes are not trackable.

Name	Route	Notes
Campus Tour	Visitor Center → Werblin Recreation Center → Livingston Student Center → College Avenue Student Center → Biel Road → Gibbons	Operated by Academy Express
Commencement Shuttle	Jersey Mike's Arena → Busch Practice Bubble	Operated by Academy Express
Commencement Shuttle	College Avenue Student Center → New Brunswick Train Station (Albany St) → Lot 48 (Busch Campus)	Operated by Academy Express
Convocation Shuttle	Busch Campus pickup: Busch Student Center → Green Lot; Busch Campus return: Lot 101 → Busch Student Center	Operated by Academy
Convocation Shuttle	College Avenue Campus pickup: College Avenue Student Center → Green Lot; College Avenue Campus return: Lot 101 → College Avenue Student Center	Operated by Academy
Convocation Shuttle	Douglass/Cook Campuses pickup: Biel Road → Green Lot; Douglass/Cook Campuses return: Livingston Student Center → Biel Road	Operated by Academy
Football Shuttle	Jersey Mike's Arena → Busch Practice Bubble	Operated by Academy Express & Rutgers Department of Transportation
Football Shuttle	College Avenue Student Center → New Brunswick Train Station (Albany St) → Johnson Park	Operated by Academy Express
Football Shuttle	Red Oak Lane → Biel Road → Johnson Park	Operated by Academy Express
New Student Orientation	Livingston Student Center → College Avenue Student Center → Gibbons → Werblin Recreation Center	Operated by Academy
Open House Day Shuttle	Visitor Center → Livingston Student Center → College Avenue Student Center → Gibbons	Operated by Academy
Rutgers Day Shuttle	Busch Student Center → Lot 48 Far → Student Activities Center SB → Zimmerli Art Museum SB → SoCam Apt SB → Douglass Student Center → George Street Northbound at Liberty Street → Zimmerli Art Museum NB → Student Activities Center NB → Lot 48 Near	Operated by Academy
Shopping Shuttle	Bevier Road (Busch Campus) → ShopRite → Walmart → Kam Man Food	Operated by Rutgers Department of Transportation; Open to students with slightly different routes on select dates throughout the semester
Social Security Shuttle	College Avenue Student Center → Social Security Administration (550 Jersey Ave #200)	Operated by Academy; Available by appointment via Rutgers Global

==== Former routes ====
===== B-He =====
B-He began as a set of B buses specifically designated to stop at the Busch/Livingston Health Center before going to Busch. B-He was first introduced as a separate route in the Fall 2022 semester as a route serving stops in opposite sequence from the B route. B-He was discontinued after the Fall 2024 semester and was replaced with B/L Loop.

Name	Route	Stops	Hours of Operation
B-He	Livingston/Busch	Livingston Student Center → Quads → Busch-Livingston Health Center → Busch Student Center → Allison Road Classroom Building → Hill Center (South) → Livingston Plaza	6:00AM–2:25AM (Mon-Fri)

===== Color Routes =====
In fall 2020, 6 Color Routes were introduced to help with social distancing on Rutgers buses due to COVID-19. They were based on regular intercampus routes, but featured less stops to reduce students traveling time on bus. These routes were implemented on August 26, 2020. However, due to low ridership, these routes were discontinued after October 2, 2020, and weekend routes were used until the end of Spring 2021 semester. In early 2021, Color Routes were planned to continue in fall 2021. However, this plan was scrapped in summer 2021, and Letter Routes were brought back for Fall 2021 with slight modifications.

Rutgers New Brunswick Color Routes (Fall 2020)

Name	Route	Notes
Purple (PRL)	College Avenue/Busch	
Blue (BLU)	Livingston/Busch	One bus designated as Blue-He (BLU/H) stops at the Busch-Livingston Health Center.
Scarlet (SCR)	College Avenue/Douglass via George Street	
Orange (ORG)	College Avenue/Livingston	
Green (GRN)	Douglass/Livingston	
Yellow (YLW)	Douglass/Busch	

===== Shuttles =====
Name	Route	Hours of Operation	Notes
Busch Library Shuttle	Library of Science & Medicine to residence halls and parking lots on Busch Campus	7:30PM–2:00AM, 7 nights per week	Departs every 30 min, operates during class and exam periods.; Operated by Rutgers Department of Transportation.; Discontinued after March 11, 2020.
Douglass Library Shuttle	Douglass Library to residence halls on Cook/Douglass Campus	7:30PM–2:00AM, 7 nights per week	Departs every 30 min, operates during class and exam periods.; Operated by Rutgers Department of Transportation.; Discontinued after March 11, 2020.
New BrunsQuick 1 Shuttle	College Ave/New Brunswick Train Station via select stops in New Brunswick	6:00AM–11:00PM, weekdays only	Operated on weekdays during the academic year and during summer.; Operated by First Transit.; Discontinued after April 24, 2020.
New BrunsQuick 2 Shuttle	College Ave/New Brunswick Train Station via select stops in New Brunswick	6:30AM–10:00PM, weekdays only	Operated on weekdays during the academic year only.; Operated by First Transit.; Runs roughly the same route as New BrunsQuick Shuttle 1, but in the opposite direction.; Discontinued after March 11, 2020.
RBHS	Robert Wood Johnson Medical School/ Clinical Academic Building	5:00AM–11:00PM, weekdays only	Operated on weekdays during the academic year and during summer.; Operated by First Transit.; Discontinued after March 11, 2020.

===== Routes operated under previous contractors =====
The majority of the below routes ran throughout the late 20th Century as alternative variants or service patterns of the current routes.

Name	Route	Notes
AX	College Avenue Express/ARC Building (Busch)	Ran for the 2000–01 school year as a test-run replacement for the A to expedite travel between Busch classes, and College Avenue for commuters.; Reverted to the A the following year.
CA	College Avenue/Stadium Lot West (Busch)	Ran as a shuttle from the Rutgers Stadium parking lot during the 1997–98 school year to help alleviate commuter congestion on College Avenue.; Replaced by rerouted A and H buses the next term.
D	College Avenue/Livingston via Highland Park	Operated as a local version of the former L route, which it was later replaced by circa 1990.
E	College Avenue / Douglass–Cook via George Street	Former local variant of the EE which originally made less stops via Downtown.; Eventually dissolved into the current EE by the mid-1990s.
G	Busch/Douglass-Cook via Livingston	Service ran until May 2005 when Route 18 reconstruction predicted to slow down service.; Eventually reincarnated into the current REXB by the middle of September 2005.
GG	Livingston/Douglass-Cook via Highland Park	Service ran until May 2005 when Route 18 reconstruction predicted to slow down service.; Eventually reincarnated into the current REXL by the middle of September 2005.
L	College Avenue/Livingston	Originally an express variant of the D, service replaced it by the mid-1990s with the introduction of the LX.; Eliminated in 2010 due to low ridership.
LXc	College Avenue/Livingston via Cedar Lane	Temporary version of the LX for the 2010–11 school year after complaints by students and staff who settled into places within the Highland Park region prior to the late-onset elimination of the L.; Did not return after Spring 2011.

=== Newark Campus ===
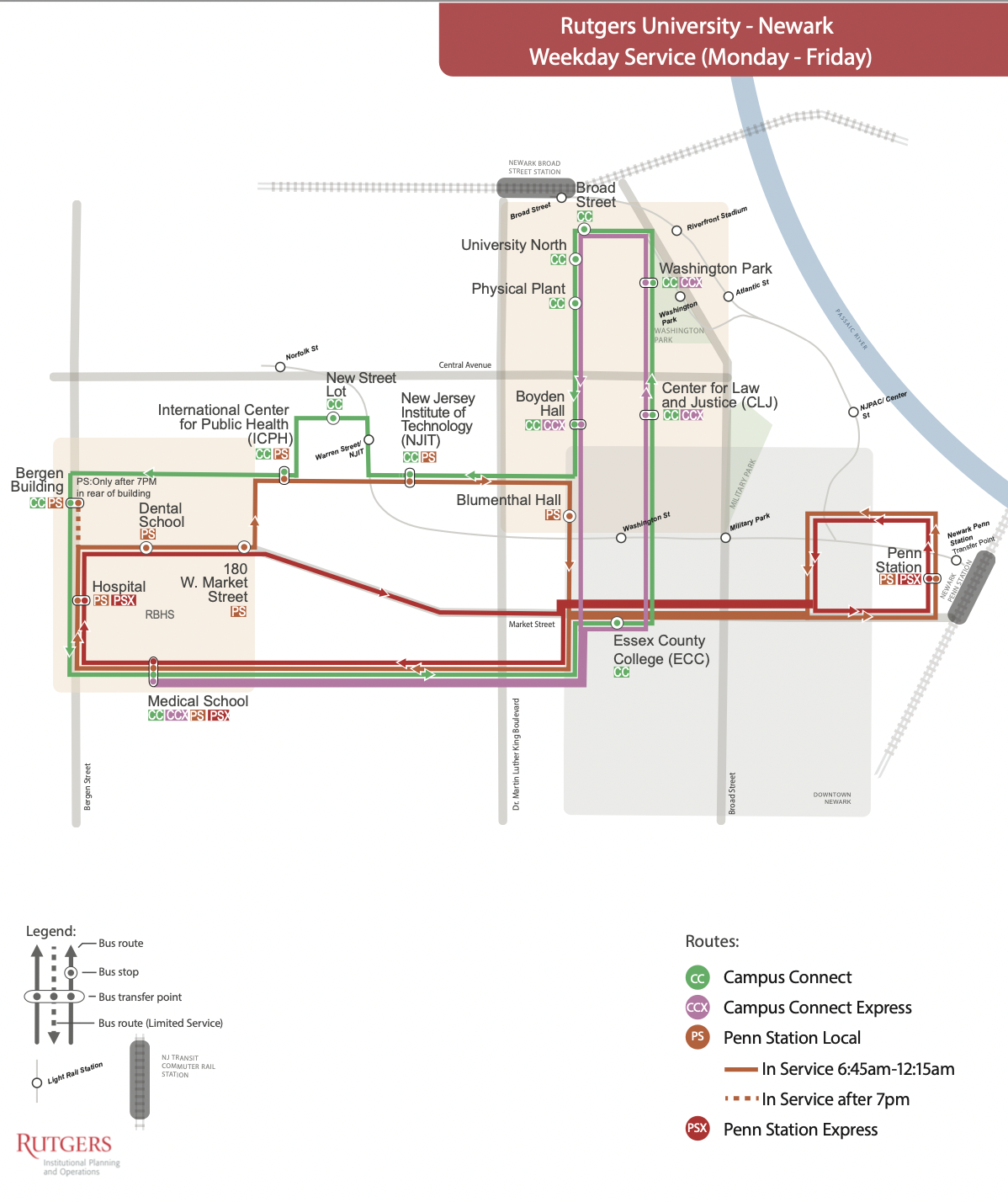
Rutgers Newark Bus System Map - Weekdays - Fall 2022

There are currently 4 routes on weekdays and 1 night service running seven nights a week for the Newark Campus.

==== Weekday routes ====
Name	Stops	Hours of Operation
Campus Connect	Boyden Hall → NJIT → New Street Lot → ICPH → Bergen Building → Medical School → ECC → Washington Park → Broad St → University North → Physical Plant	7:00AM–11:30PM
Campus Connect Express	Boyden Hall → Medical School → CLJ → Washington Park	9:05AM–3:25PM
Newark Penn Station Local	Penn Station → Medical School → University Hospital → Bergen Building (after 7pm only) → Dental School → 180 W. Market St. → ICPH → Blumenthal Hall	6:45AM–12:15AM
Newark Penn Station Express	Penn Station → Medical School → University Hospital	7:00AM–10:00AM; 3:00PM–7:00PM

The Newark Penn Station Midnight Express Security Shuttle operates between 12:00AM and 4:00AM every day, providing transportation between Newark Penn Station and the Rutgers Newark Campus via Boyden Hall.

==== Former routes ====
Name	Hours of Operation	Notes
Newark Kearny	3:00PM–12:00AM	Discontinued after February 26, 2021.
Newark Run Run	7:00AM–12:00AM	Intracampus shuttle that ran seven days a week (excluding holidays), stopping at Boyden Hall, Golden Dome, CLJ (Rutgers Law), 15 Washington, Broad St. Station, Physical Plant, and Newark Penn Station (morning/evening only).; Discontinued since Fall 2020.
Newark Run Run Express	7:00AM–10:00AM; 3:00PM–7:00PM	Express version of Newark Run Run, stopping at Boyden Hall, CLJ, Washington Park, Broad St, and Physical Plant.; Discontinued since Fall 2020.

=== Camden Campus ===
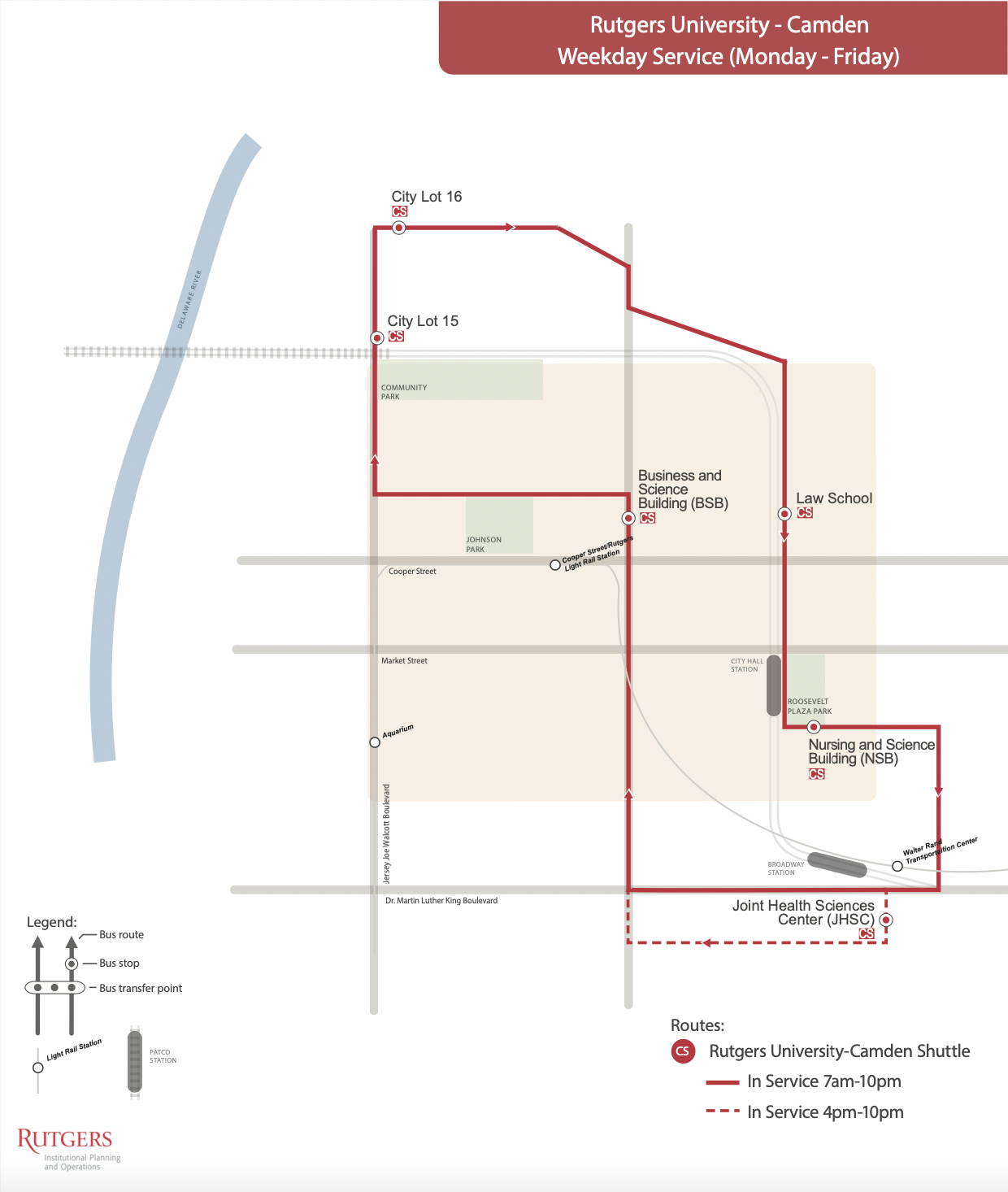
Rutgers Camden Bus System Map - Weekdays - Fall 2022

Bus routes for the Camden Campus only operate on weekdays.

Name	Stops	Hours of Operation
Camden Shuttle	City Lot 15 → City Lot 16 → Law School → Nursing & Science Building → Joint Health Sciences Center → Business & Science Building	7:00AM–10:00PM

== Bus Tracking ==
The Rutgers Campus Buses system officially uses the TripShot app. The app informs users on the real-time location of every bus on all three campuses (New Brunswick, Newark, and Camden). There are other bus trackers to help track the Rutgers buses such as XRadar and RUBus that are student made.

== Fleet ==
Academy Bus Lines operates a variety of heavy-duty transit buses for Rutgers University's campus bus service. The bulk of the fleet consists of 40-foot ENC Axess BRT buses, with the majority being built new for Academy's new contract with Rutgers as well as 15 acquired from Transdev, the previous contractor. Academy also operates a handful of 40-foot Gillig Low Floor buses acquired from Transdev and refurbished New Flyer XD40 buses. Much of the current Academy fleet for Rutgers can be referenced in the table below.

Manufacturer	Model	Fleet number(s)	Photo	Model Year	Notes
New Flyer	XD40	2305-2317		2011-13	Acquired from various transit agencies in the US and Canada.
New Flyer	XD40	2501		2012	Acquired from various transit agencies in the US and Canada.
New Flyer	XD40	2502-2510		2016	Acquired from various transit agencies in the US and Canada.
ENC	Axess BRT 40'	2685-2699		2023	Acquired from the previous Transdev contract.
ENC	Axess BRT 40'	2741-2765		2026	
ENC	E-Z Rider II BRT 32'	2951–2952, 2954–2957		2024	
Gillig	Low Floor EV 40'	4054E-4058E		2024	Acquired from the previous Transdev contract.
Gillig	Low Floor 40'	12491-12500		2024-25	Acquired from the previous Transdev contract.
