= NJ Transit bus garages =

Bus garages in New Jersey, United States

New Jersey Transit (NJ Transit) was created by the Public Transportation Act of 1979 to “acquire, operate and contract for transportation service in the public interest.” In 1980, it purchased Transport of New Jersey, at that time the state’s largest private bus company, including its bus maintenance and storage facilities; it has subsequently acquired numerous other previously privately owned or corporate carriers.

NJ Transit Bus Operations is organised into three operating divisions: Northern, Central, and Southern. Each division has bus depots to house and maintain its bus fleet. As of 2024 NJ Transit had over 2800 buses and eighteen garages across the state. It also has over 500 minibuses and 50 vans used for community transportation. In addition to directly operated routes, NJ Transit also provides buses to carriers providing service on NJ Transit routes under contract, as well as private carriers operating their own routes. Most maintain their own garages.

NJ Transit introduced compressed natural gas (CNG) buses in 1999 and hybrid electric buses in 2007. As of the 2020s, NJ Transit is making the transition to clean diesel and battery electric buses (New Flyer Industries XE40 CHARGE NG first introduced in 2022) as part of its reduced-emission strategy. It intends to eventually build a 100% zero-emission fleet by 2040. In order to accommodate the new fleet some garages will be closed, others retrofitted for distributed generation, and new ones built.

== Bus garages ==
=== Northern Division ===
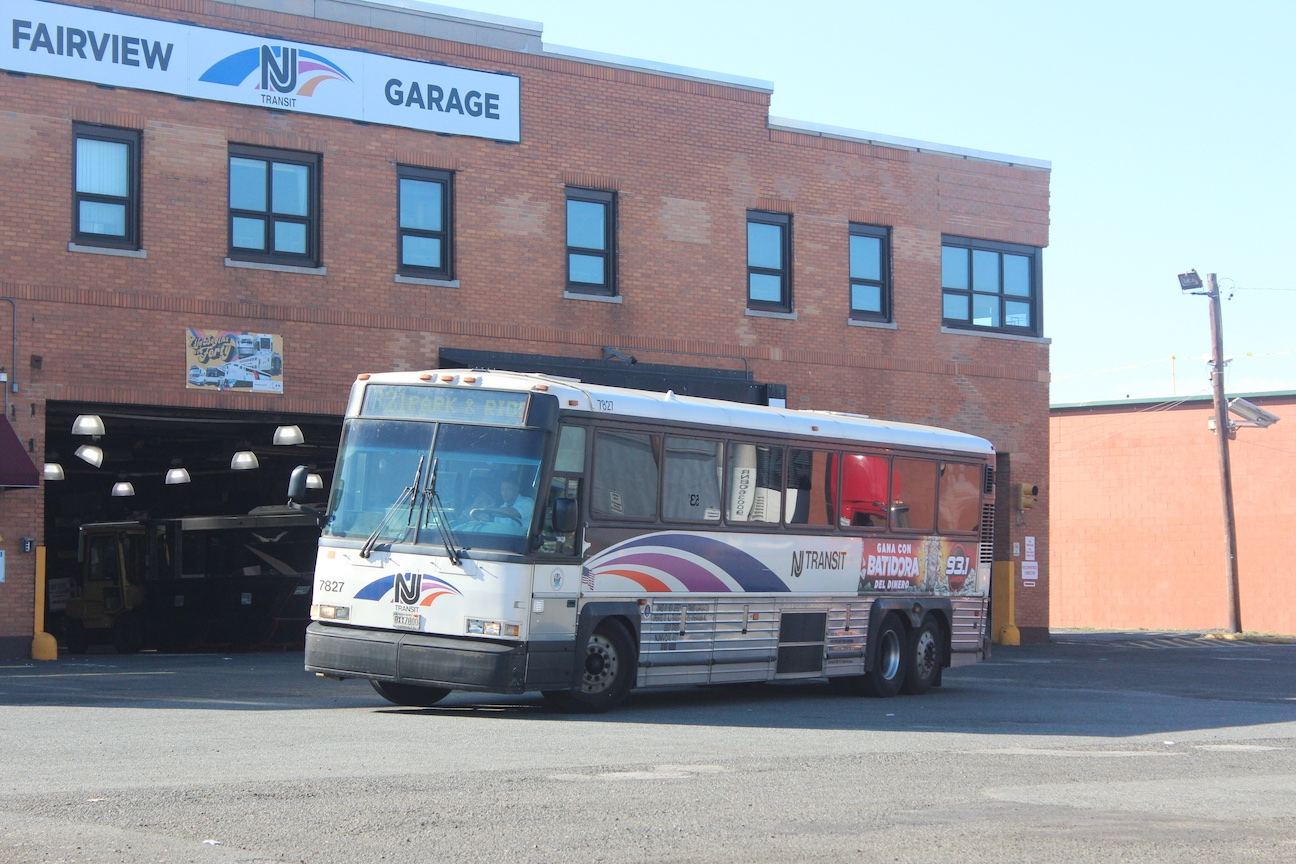
Fairview Garage

| Name | Location | Notes |
| Fairview | 419 Anderson Avenue, Fairview; 40.820332°N 73.992184°W | Houses many of buses on routes 100–199 in the Hudson Waterfront communities along the Palisade Avenue, Bergenline Avenue, Boulevard East, and River Road corridors to the Port Authority Bus Terminal. Planned for closure. |
| Market Street | 16 Market Street, Paterson; 40.914344°N 74.177939°W | Built in 1903 as a trolley barn for Jersey City, Hoboken and Paterson Street Railway, later Public Service Railway. Now part of the Great Falls Historic District, underwent renovation in 2021–2023. Operates local routes in Passaic, Bergen, and Essex (many originating at Broadway Bus Terminal) and commuter routes to GWB Plaza/GWB Bus Terminal. Considered obsolete, it planned for expansion and retrofitting, and possible replacement. |
| Meadowlands | 2600 Penhorn Avenue, North Bergen/ Secaucus; 40.779441°N 74.043757°W | Operates 32 bus routes in Hudson County. It is located adjacent to the North Bergen P+R under the Lincoln Tunnel Approach, with service to the Port Authority Bus Terminal on bus route 320. Built in 1993, it slated for expansion and retrofitting to handle longer articulated buses and electric buses. Initial construction of an outdoor charging facility with a overhead canopy/catenary and pantographs will provide charging equipment for 67 buses by 2028 and will include the infrastructure to expand the site to accommodate 130 buses. |
| Oradell | 455 New Milford Avenue, Oradell; 40.941265°N 74.026103°W | Opened in 1962 near County Route 503 (Kinderkamack Road). Adjacent to Hackensack River, it flooded in 2021 as a result of Hurricane Ida. Considered obsolete, planned for closure. |
| Wayne | 55 West Belt Parkway, Wayne; 40.900118°N 74.247751°W | Built to replace Madison Ave garage in Paterson and Warwick Garage in Warwick, New York in 1998, it was upgraded in 2000. It is located near the intersection of New Jersey Route 23, U.S. Route 46, and Interstate 80 near Wayne Route 23 Transit Center and Willowbrook Mall, major park and ride/bus stations for the region. Renovations in 2021 began work to eventually handle battery electric buses. |
| Westwood | 180 Old Hook Road, Westwood; 40.984673°N 74.017496°W | NJ Transit leased, and subsequently purchased in 2022, the former Rockland Coaches facility to alleviate overcrowding at Oradell Garage. Will house reassigned diesel buses as other facilities are retrofitted for electric buses. Operates commuter service between Bergen and Hudson counties to Manhattan. |

NJT also owns three lots for layovers of buses on routes originating at the Port Authority Bus Terminal, one of which is at the entrance to the Lincoln Tunnel in Weehawken.

==== Future garages ====
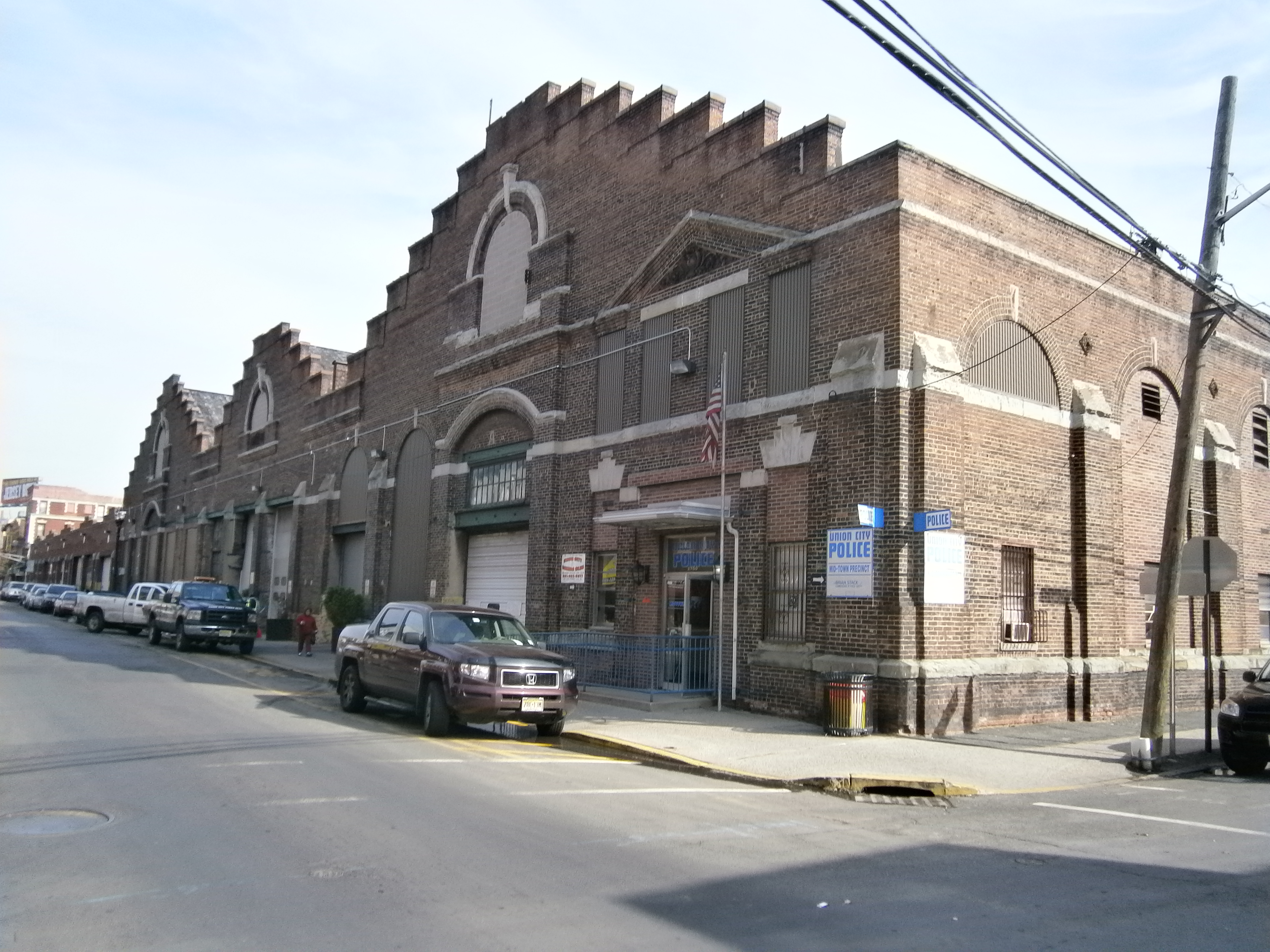
Former depot on Bergenline Avenue replaced by Meadowlands Garage and Facility in 1993

| Name | Location | Notes |
| Northern Bus Garage | Adjacent to U.S. Route 46 and the New Jersey Turnpike; Ridgefield Park; 40.844197°N 74.016°W | Sited on more than 50 acres (20 ha) and equipped to handle 500 buses, the newly constructed facility will replace Oradell and Fairview garages and is scheduled to be completed in 2029. |
| Union City Bus Garage | Bergenline Avenue at 28-29th streets in Union City; 40.770067°N 74.030079°W | After demolition of existing facility, once the trolley barn for the North Hudson County Railway and later Public Service Coordinated Transport, the newly constructed garage will accommodate 40 articulated, emission-free buses. The 100,000 square foot facility is projected to be completed in 2030. |

=== Central Division ===
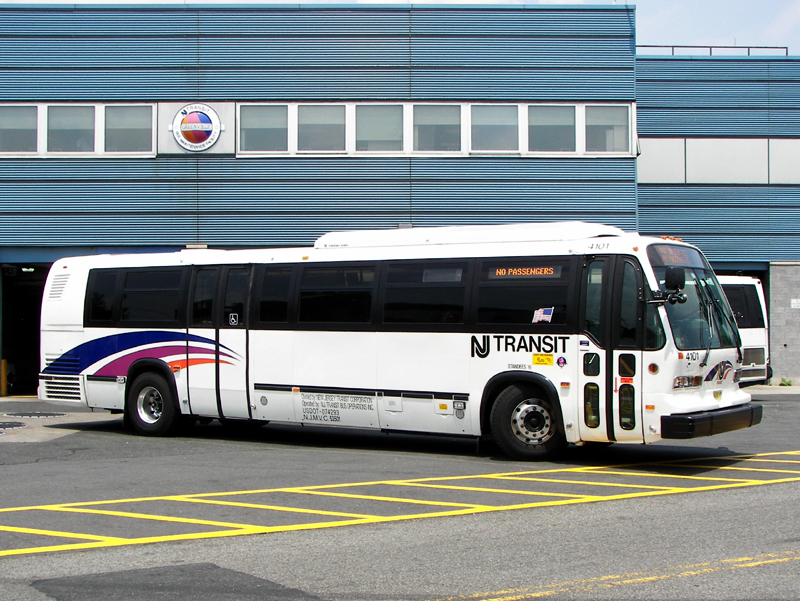
Greenville Bus Garage

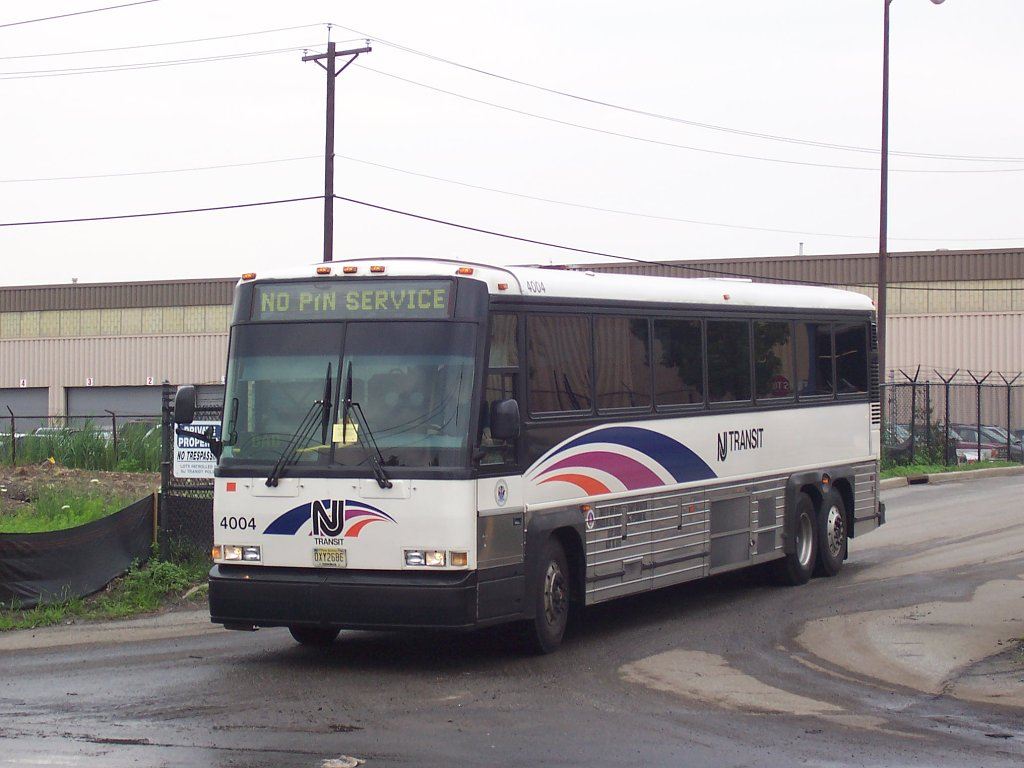
MCI D4000 hybrid leaving Ironbound Garage

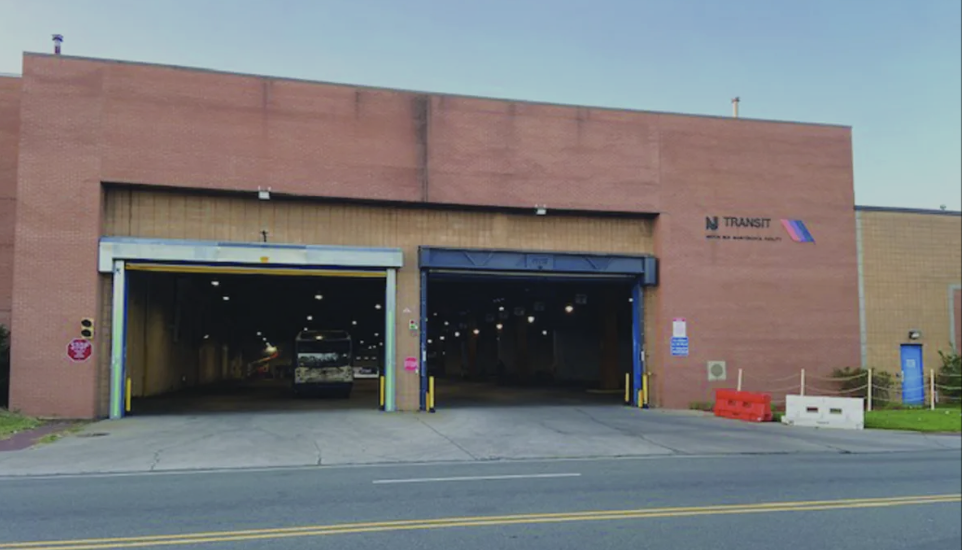
Hilton in Maplewood

| Name | Location | Notes |
| Big Tree | 1 Washington Avenue, Nutley; 40°48′25″N 74°8′52″W | Opened in 1989. Located on New Jersey Route 7, it operates local routes in Newark and adjacent towns. Planned for closure. |
| Greenville | 53 Old Bergen Road, Greenville, Jersey City; 40°41′38″N 74°5′43″W | Originally a part of the Northern Division. Opened in 1998 on the site of the former Greenville garage, It largely handles routes in southern Hudson County below Journal Square. Slated for retrofitting for electric buses. |
| Hilton | 1450 Springfield Avenue, Maplewood; 40.723794°N 74.250879°W | Located near Irvington Bus Terminal. Site of head-on collision between bus and garbage truck, in which bus driver died, in 2018. Adaption to handle battery-operated electric emission-free buses expected to be completed in 2025 with construction of an overhead pantogragh charging system. First deployment will be on GO25 Irvington-Newark line. |
| Howell | 1251 U.S. 9, Howell 40.196814°N 74.248664°W | Built in 1985. Houses most of NJT's compressed natural gas (CNG) fleet (147 as of 2024) and operates many routes along the Route 9 corridor. |
| Ironbound | 677 Wilson Ave, Newark; 40.715436°N 74.132159°W | Ironbound Garage and the adjacent Kearny Point Garage are just north the Newark Airport Interchange and south U.S. Route 1/9 Truck and Raymond Boulevard, the latter of which provides access to Newark Penn Station. Opened in 1997, it is a major maintenance facility for the NJT fleet. |
| Kearny Point | 442 Avenue P, Newark; 40.715436°N 74.132159°W | Kearny Point Garage and adjacent Ironbound Garage are west the Kearny Point Reach of the Passaic River. Kearny Point was an disused factory converted to a NJT garage when Coach USA's ONE Bus stopped operations and opened in August 2024. |
| Morris | 34 Richboynton Road, Dover; 40°53′23″N 74°34′1″W | Was the facility of PABCO Transit (Passaic-Athenia Bus Company) until 2010 when the company became NJ Transit subsidiary. |
| Orange | 420 Washington Street, Orange; 40.781328°N 74.224160°W | New garage opened in 1989. Operates local routes in Greater Newark. |

=== Southern Division ===
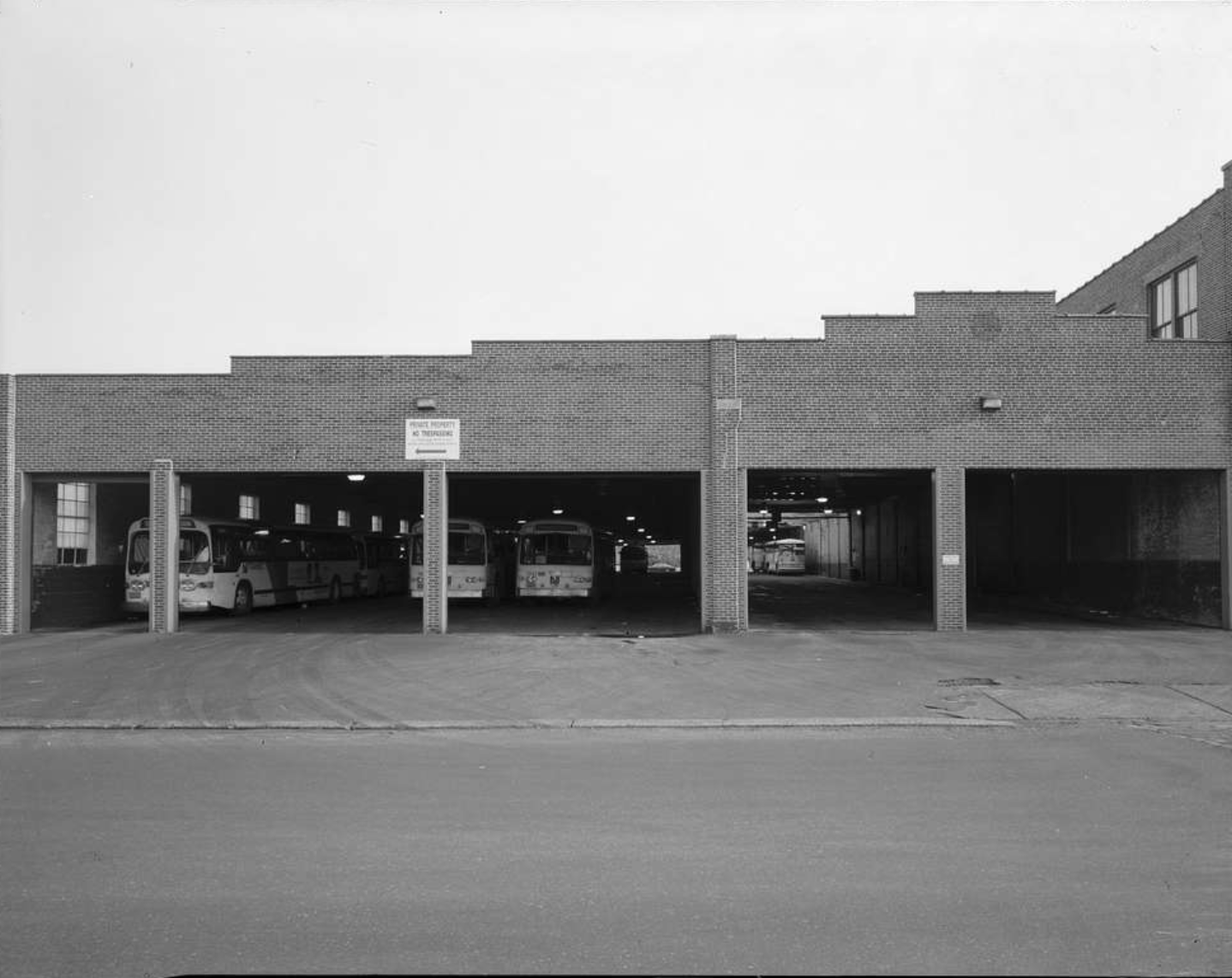
Newton Avenue Garage in the 1960s

| Name | Location | Notes |
| Egg Harbor Township | 1431 Doughty Road, Egg Harbor Township | Operates local and long-distance routes with and to points in the Greater Atlantic City and Southern Shore Region. |
| Hamilton Township | 600 Sloan Avenue, Hamilton Township; 40°15′19″N 74°42′14″W | Built in 1998, it is adjacent to NJT's Hamilton rail station. Operates buses in the Trenton-Mercer area. Slated to accommodate electric buses. |
| Neptune | 830 Old Corlies Avenue, Neptune City | NJT Mercer took over the Monmouth County local routes on October 1, 2023, after Transdev ceased operating them and closed their Old Corlies Avenue garage in Neptune City |
| Newton Avenue Garage | 350 Newton Avenue, Camden; 39.940333°N 75.111207°W | Once part of Public Service Coordinated Transport. The facility became home and recharging station for NJT's first eight battery-operated buses in 2022. |
| Washington Township | 6000 East Black Horse Pike, Turnersville; 39.765241°N 75.047154°W | Replaced the Turnersville Garage on the same site in 1990 at the intersection of New Jersey Route 42 and Atlantic City Expressway. Operates bus routes across Camden, Gloucester, and Salem counties. |

=== Contracted bus garages ===
| Name | Address | Notes |
| Academy Bus Lines | various | Operates many of NJ Transit bus 700 local routes in Bergen/Passaic as well New York service from Central Jersey. |
| Community Coach | 160 Route 17 North, Paramus | |
| Lakeland Bus Lines | 425 East Blackwell Street, Dover | |
| Olympia Trails | 349 1st Street, Elizabeth | |
| Salem County Community Transit | 88 Industrial Park Road, Pennsville | Operates the 468 |
| Suburban Transit | 750 Somerset Street, New Brunswick | Operates many of 800 numbered NJT routes |
| Trans-Bridge Lines | 2012 Industrial Drive, Bethlehem | Operates the 890, 891 |

== Former garages ==
=== NJ Transit operated ===
| Name | Address | Notes |
| Atlantic City/Wildwood | | Replaced by Egg Harbor Township. |
| Elizabeth | | Replaced by Ironbound. |
| Madison Avenue | | Replaced by Wayne. |
| Matawan | | Replaced by Howell. |
| Mercer Metro | | Replaced by Hamilton. |
| Union City | | Replaced by Meadowlands. Site of will be used to build a new facility. |
| Warwick | | Replaced by Wayne. |

=== Contracted operated ===
| Name | Address | Notes |
| A&C Bus Corporation | 430 Danforth Avenue, Jersey City | Shut down on October 28, 2023, with their routes taken over by NJ Transit. |
| Asbury Park-New York Transit | | |
| Bergen Avenue IBOA | 1081 Broadway, Bayonne | Shutdown in 2011 with route taken over by A&C Bus Corporation. |
| Blue & Grey Transit | | |
| Broadway IBOA | 1329 Kennedy Blvd, Bayonne | Independent company running one line along Broadway; Shut down on November 30, 2025 with their route taken over by NJ Transit as the new Route 12. |
| Carefree Bus Lines | | |
| Central Avenue IBOA | 297 Communipaw Avenue Jersey City | |
| DeCamp Bus Lines | 101 Greenwood Avenue, Montclair | Ended on April 10, 2023, with their routes operating to NJT. |
| Downtown Bus Company | 1 Oxford Avenue Jersey City | |
| Evergreen Equipment | | |
| Hudson Bus Company | | |
| Hudson Transit Lines | | |
| Independent Bus | | |
| Lafayette And Greenville | 119 Merrit Street and 44 State Street both Jersey City | |
| Leisure Line | | |
| Lion Bus Corporation of New Jersey | | |
| North Boulevard Transportation Company/Red And Tan in Hudson County | 437 Tonnele Avenue Jersey City 349 1st Street, Elizabeth | Bought out by Coach USA in 2002.; Moved to Olympia Trails garage in 2006.; Brand discontinued in 2012. |
| Orange Newark Elizabeth Bus | 349 1st Street, Elizabeth | Discontinued on October 8, 2023 with all routes going to NJ Transit. |
| Rockland Coaches | 180 Old Hook Road, Westwood | Operations moved to Suburban Transit garage.; Property bought by NJT in September 2022 to alleviate overcrowding at Oradell Garage. |
| Saddle River Tours | 480 Main Ave, Wallington 30 Moonachie Ave, Carlstadt | |
| South Boulevard Bus Owners Association/Drogin | 53 Kennedy Boulevard Bayonne | |
| South Orange Avenue IBOA | | Bought out by Coach USA in 2002. |
| Transdev | 830 Old Corlies Avenue, Neptune City | |
| Washington Street IBOA | | |
| West Hunterdon Transit | | |
