= NYC Express Bus =

- Parent: Golden Touch Transportation of NY, Inc.
- Founded: 2011
- Ceased operation: 2020
- Headquarters: Astoria, New York
- Locale: New York City
- Service area: Midtown Manhattan
- Service type: Express bus service
- Destinations: LGA, JFK, PenStation, PABT, GCT
- Operator: Golden Touch Transportation of NY, Inc./franchised bus operators

NYC Express Bus, formerly known as NYC Airporter, was an airport transfer service. NYC Express bus service operated express motor coaches between New York metropolitan area airports and Manhattan owned by Golden Touch Transportation of NY, Inc. It was the only permitted official operator of express airport bus service for the New York City Department of Transportation and Port Authority of New York and New Jersey (the airports' operator).

NYC Express bus was managed by Golden Touch Transportation, a Transdev affiliate, and operated by franchised bus operators using Golden Touch/NYC Airporter-branded vehicles. These vehicles included diesel and hybrid-electric cutaway buses built on IC Bus chassis, Gillig transit buses, and others. Operations began in January 2011 when Golden Touch acquired the John F. Kennedy International Airport and LaGuardia Airport express airport bus permit with the NYCDOT and Port Authority, previously held by New York Airport Service (which now operates vans instead of their buses), allowing Golden Touch to begin express service from Manhattan to the two airports and ended sometime in 2020. The service was branded NYC Airporter, “Your Express Ride to New York City”.

Buses traveled between scheduled stops at John F. Kennedy International Airport and LaGuardia Airport to streetside pickup and dropoff points near New York Penn Station, Grand Central Terminal, and the Port Authority Bus Terminal in Manhattan. It also booked customers through Coach USA Olympia Trails' Newark Airport Express bus service, where customers traveling into Kennedy or LaGuardia going to Newark Liberty International Airport could purchase one ticket from NYC Airporter to transfer to Olympia's bus service in Manhattan.

== Routes ==
| Route | Terminus A | Terminus B | Terminus C | Terminus D |
|---|---|---|---|---|
| JFK-Manhattan | JFK Airport | Grand Central | Times Square | |
| LaGuardia-Manhattan | LaGuardia Airport | Grand Central | Times Square | Port Authority |
| LaGuardia-JFK | LaGuardia Airport | JFK Airport | | |
