= Red & Tan =

Red & Tan (or Red and Tan) was the name of two Coach USA bus operators in the New York metropolitan area:

- Red & Tan in Hudson County, a former brand of Olympia Trails, serving southern Hudson County, New Jersey
- Rockland Coaches (The Red & Tan Lines), serving Bergen County, New Jersey and Rockland County, New York
