= NJ Transit bus fleet =

Buses used by NJ Transit

As of 2025, the active fleet of NJ Transit Bus Operations consists of approximately 2800 buses which are housed and maintained at eighteen NJ Transit bus garages. NJ Transit and companies leasing buses from the state agency use various models of buses between 25 feet (7.6 m) (minibuses) and 60 feet (18 m) in length (some of which are articulated) to provide local and commuter service within the state of New Jersey and adjacent parts of New York and Pennsylvania. NJ Transit introduced compressed natural gas (CNG) buses in 1999 (147 as of 2024) and hybrid electric buses in 2007. As of the 2020s, NJ Transit began introducing clean diesel and battery electric buses to make the transition towards building a lower or zero-emission fleet. The rosters below list current and past buses purchased or otherwise acquired by NJ Transit for heavy duty fixed-route service.

== Active fleet ==
All buses here are fully ADA compliant. Unless noted, buses are 102 in (2.6 m) wide. Unless noted otherwise, all units for an order operate under NJ Transit.

Year	Make & Model	Length	Picture	Engine	Transmission	Numbers (Total)	Notes
2007–2009	NABI; 40-SFW 416.15 Suburban	38.5 feet (11.7 m)		5201-5229, 5231-5345: Caterpillar C9; 5230, 5346-5450: Cummins ISL	5201: ZF Ecomat 4 6HP594C; 5202-5345: ZF Ecomat 4 6HP604C; 5346-5450: ZF Ecomat 4 6HP594C	5201–5450 (250 buses, retiring)	5201 was donated to Virtua Health.
2009–2013	NABI; 40-SFW 416.15	38.5 feet (11.7 m)		Cummins ISL9	5502-5630: ZF Ecomat 4 6HP594C; 5631-6549: ZF Ecolife 6AP1400B	5501–6549 (1049 buses)	Operated under: New Jersey Transit; Coach USA (Suburban, Olympia Trails); Academy Bus Lines; Salem County Transit; 5535, 5612, 5613, 5650, 5700, 5745, 5757, 5784, 5842, 5968, 5998, 6010, 6030, 6072, 6101, 6153, 6255, 6348, 6354, 6367, 6416, and 6457 have been retired due to damage from various incidents.; 6413 & 6379 have a Transport of New Jersey heritage scheme.
2011	MCI; D4500CT	45 feet (14 m)		Detroit Diesel Series 60 EGR	Allison B500	8951-8952 (2 buses)	Operated under Academy Bus Lines.
2011-2012	NABI; 31-LFW	31 feet (9.4 m)		Cummins ISL9	Allison B400R Gen V	1601–1639 (39 buses)	
2014–2015	MCI; D4500CT CNG	45 feet (14 m)		Cummins Westport ISL G	Allison B500	7215-7361 (147 buses)	7255 and 7271 were retired due to accidents.
2015-2016	MCI; D4500CTH	45 feet (14 m)		Cummins ISL9	Allison H 50 EP Hybrid System	4008-4044 (36 buses)(retiring)	
2016	MCI; D4500CT	45 feet (14 m)		Cummins ISL9	Allison B500	16001-16003 (3 buses)	Operated under: New Jersey Transit; Coach USA (Community Coach, Suburban Transit, Short Line); Academy Bus Lines; Lakeland Bus Lines; Trans-Bridge Lines; 18097-18119 and 19031-19067 are equipped with lavatories.; 16003, 18014, 18016, 18030, 18043, 19137, 20072, 20079, 20089, 20094, 20103, and 20109 have been retired due to damage from various incidents.; 16002 is a training bus at NJ Transit's Central Maintenance Facility.; 20120, 20121, 20122, 20124, and 21253 were repainted into a Transport of New Jersey scheme.
2017	MCI; D4500CT	45 feet (14 m)		Cummins ISX12 17185: Cummins X12	Allison B500	17001-17240 (240 buses)	
2018	MCI; D4500CT	45 feet (14 m)		Cummins ISX12	Allison B500	18001-18129 (129 buses)	
2019	MCI; D4500CT	45 feet (14 m)		Cummins ISX12 19104, 19119-19127: Cummins X12	Allison B500	19001-19182 (182 buses)	
2020	MCI; D4500CT	45 feet (14 m)	2020 MCI D4500CT 20031 on route 190	Cummins X12	Allison B500	20001-20183 (183 buses)	
2021	MCI; D4500CT	45 feet (14 m)		Cummins X12	Allison B500	21001-21367 (367 buses)	
2022	MCI; D4500CT	45 feet (14 m)		Cummins X12	Allison B500	22001–22118 (118 buses)	
2020	New Flyer Industries; XD60 Xcelsior articulated	60 feet (18 m)		Cummins L9	Allison B500R	20801-20910 (110 buses)	
2022	New Flyer Industries; XE40 Xcelsior CHARGE	40 feet (12 m)		Siemens HV 1DB2016	Siemens ELFA3	22901-22908 (8 buses)	Option for 75 additional buses under a 5-year contract.
2023	Ford E-450 Coach and Equipment Phoenix	20 feet (6.1 m)		Ford V8		23901-23904 (4 buses)	Ford E-450 chassis, Coach and Equipment Phoenix body.; Operated by Delaware River Coach Lines, and used on the 890 and 891 routes.
2024	New Flyer Industries; XD60 Xcelsior articulated	60 feet (18 m)		Cummins L9	Allison B500R	24001-24060 (60 buses)	
2025-2026	New Flyer Industries; XD40 Xcelsior	40 feet (12 m)		Cummins L9	Allison B400R	25201-25375 (under delivery) (375 buses)	RFP for 550 clean diesel buses due on January 11, 2023, having been delayed from October 22, 2022.; To replace older NABI 40-SFW 416.15 buses.; Option up to 750 additional buses for a total of 1300 buses.; Entered service on March 5, 2025.
2026	New Flyer Industries; XD60 Xcelsior articulated	60 feet (18 m)		Cummins L9	TBD	26001-26100 (under delivery) (100 buses)	These buses are the first of a 200 articulated bus order with an option order of 550 buses for up to 750 articulated buses.; 200 buses will be built between 2026 and 2027, marking one of the larger clean-diesel bus procurements in New Flyer’s history.

== Future fleet ==
Year	Make & Model	Length	Powertrain (Engine / Transmission)	Numbers	Notes
2026-	New Flyer Industries; XD40 Xcelsior	40 feet (12 m)	Cummins X10	TBD (292-1042 buses)	The remaining buses from the RFP for 550 clean diesel buses, with an option up to 750 additional buses for a grand total of 1300 total buses.
2020s-2030s	TBD	40 feet (12 m)	Electric	TBD (8 buses)	Eight electric buses out of Hilton Garage.
2020s-2030s	TBD	40 feet (12 m)	Electric	TBD (roughly 1000 buses)	Planned expansion of the electric fleet to include roughly 1,000 more electrics in the next 10 years.
2020s-2030s	New Flyer Industries; XE60 CHARGE NG Xcelsior	60 feet (18 m)	Electric	TBD (4 buses)	Four electric articulated buses out of Hilton Garage.
2020s-2030s	New Flyer Industries; XD60 Xcelsior articulated	60 feet (18 m)	TBD	TBD (200-750 buses)	200 articulated buses with an option order of 550 buses for up to 750 articulated buses. A similar order for 208 units was purchased, but it is unknown if its part of this order or another option.
2020s-2030s	TBD	35 feet (11 m)	TBD	TBD	To replace NABI 31-LFW buses.

== Demo buses ==
Year	Builder	Model	Length (ft)	Width (in)	Seating	Disabled access	Engine	Numbers	Notes
1981	Volvo	B10M Articulated	60	102	Transit	✗	Volvo	9000	Demo articulated bus.
1981	Volvo	B10M	40	102	Transit	✗	Volvo	9001	Demo Volvo 40-foot bus
1981	MAN	SG310-18-2L	60	102	Transit	✗	MAN D2566 MLUM	9100	Demo MAN articulated bus.
1986	Neoplan	AN460-A Transliner	60	96	Suburban	✓	Detroit Diesel series 6V92TA	PA9100	Demo Transliner.
1988	Flxible	Metro-B; 40096-6T	40	96	Transit	✓	Detroit Diesel series 6V92TA	8050	Demo bus for the 1989 Metro-B order.
1989	OBI Orion	05.501	40	102	Transit	✓	Detroit Diesel series 6V92TA	Unknown	Demo Orion V. Became Transit Windsor (ON) 499 and retired in 2014.
1993	Flxible	Metro-D; 40102-6C8	40	102	Transit	✓	Cummins C8.3	8083	Demo bus for the 1994 Metro-D order.
1995	Nova Bus	RTS T80206	40	102	Transit	✓	Detroit Diesel Series 50	2600	Demo bus for the 1995 RTS-06 order.
1996	MCI	102-D3	40	102	Suburban	✓	Cummins M11E	8011	Demo 102-D3 for the 2001–2003 MCI D4000/D4500 order. Owned by Penske, sold to a charter company (later destroyed by a fire).
1996	MCI	102-D3	40	102	Suburban	✓	Detroit Diesel series 60	8060	Demo 102-D3 for the 2001–2003 MCI D4000/D4500 order. Owned by Penske.
2003	NABI	416.14	40	102	Suburban	✓	Detroit Diesel Series 50EGR	5722	Demo 416.14 for the 2008–2009 NABI 416.15 order. Owned by Dallas DART. Returned shortly before 416.15s 5201 and 5202 were delivered.

== Retired production buses ==
=== Acquired before 1980 ===
This list includes Transport of New Jersey, NJDOT-owned, and NJ Transit buses.

- 1960-1973 GMC "New Look" – majority inherited from Transport of New Jersey and the Maplewood Equipment Company.
- Late 1960s MCI MC-7 – majority were ex-Greyhound
- 1970s GMC PD-4106 and PD-4107 ("Buffalo")
- 1973 Highway Products, Inc. TC-31 – assigned to Passaic-Athenia Bus Lines, maybe others
- 1975-1978 MCI MC-8 – purchased surplus from various sources
- 1976 Flxible 35096-8-1 (30 feet) most were assigned to private carriers.
- 1976 Flxible 45102-8-1 (35 feet) – most assigned to private carriers. Some units were built with single doors.
- 1976 Flxible 53096-8-1 (40 feet/96 inches) – most assigned to private carriers. Some units were built with single doors and suburban-style seating.
- 1976 Flxible 53102-8-1 (40 feet/102 inches) – most assigned to private carriers. Some units were built with single doors and suburban-style seating.
- 1979 Flxible 870 – purchased secondhand as replacements for destroyed ex-NYCT 870s.
- Various GM Buffalo style buses – late 1970s model years, purchased secondhand
- Various Flxible "New Look" buses – various model years, purchased secondhand.

=== Acquired after 1980 ===
Buses with a "PA" prefix were purchased using Port Authority of New York and New Jersey funds.

Year	Builder	Model	Picture	Length (ft)	Width (in)	Seating	Disabled access	Engine/Transmission	Numbers (preserved numbers)	Retired
1980 (acquired 1986 from NYCTA & MABSTOA)	Grumman-Flxible	870-B; 53102-6-1		40	102	Transit and Suburban	Some	Detroit Diesel series 6V71N Allison V730	1500–1619, 2000-2518 (Note: 1500–1593 & 1612–1619 purchased with Port Authority of New York and New Jersey funds and had "PA" prefixes) (1596)	1999–2004
1981	Grumman-Flxible	870-A; 40102-6-1		40	102	Transit		Detroit Diesel series 6V92TA; Allison V730	1000-1270 (Note: 1000–1210 purchased with Port Authority of New York and New Jersey funds and had "PA" prefixes) (1128, 1154)	1993–1997
1982–1984	MCI	MC-9A		40	96	Suburban		Detroit Diesel series 6V92TA; Allison HT740	6100-6799 (Note: 6100-6501 & 6562-6799 purchased with Port Authority of New York and New Jersey funds and had "PA" prefixes) (6106)	2001–2003
1983, 1986 (Note: After a fire at Union City garage, two 1986 models were purchased to replace the damaged ones)	Flxible	Metro-A; 40102-6T		40	102	Transit		Detroit Diesel series 6V92TA; Allison V730	1300-1464 (Note: 1300–1388, 1409, 1410, 1448, & 1449 purchased with Port Authority of New York and New Jersey funds and had "PA" prefixes)	1994–1998
1985	Volvo	B10M articulated		60	102	Transit	(except 9256)	Volvo THD100; ZF Ecomat 4HP590	9100-9149 (Note: Purchased with Port Authority of New York and New Jersey funds and had "PA" prefixes)	2003–2004
1985	Volvo	B10M articulated		60	96	Suburban	(except 9256)	Volvo THD100; ZF Ecomat 4HP590	9200-9259 (Note: Purchased with Port Authority of New York and New Jersey funds and had "PA" prefixes)	2003–2004
1987	MCI	MC-9B		40	96	Suburban		Detroit Diesel series 6V92TA; Allison HTB748	5000-5414 (Note: 5000-5133, 5172-5191, & 5194-5414 purchased with Port Authority of New York and New Jersey funds and had "PA" prefixes) (5036)	2006–2007
1987	MCI	96A3		40	96	Suburban		Detroit Diesel series 6V92TA; Allison HTB748	5450	2004
1989	Eagle Bus	AE20		40	96	Suburban		Detroit Diesel series 6V92TA; Allison HTB748	5500-5618 (5531)	2002
1988–1989	Flxible	Metro-B; 40096-6T		40	96	Suburban	Some	Detroit Diesel series 6V92TA DDEC; Allison V731	3000-3280 (3057)	2003–2010
1988–1989	Flxible	Metro-B; 40102-6T		40	102	Transit (1700s); Suburban (3000s)	1700s only	Detroit Diesel series 6V92TA DDEC; Allison V731	1700–1721, 3500-3606	2006–2010
1991	Flxible	Metro-C; 40102-6C CNG		40	102	Transit		Cummins L10G; ZF Ecomat 5HP590	1722-1726 (Note: later 0001-0005, then NGV1-NGV5)	2004
1994 (3700 was a 1993 unit)	Flxible	Metro-D; 40102-6C8		40	102	Transit (1000s); Suburban (3700s)		Cummins C8.3; ZF Ecomat 5HP590	3700-3791 (3778)	2009–2011
1994 (3700 was a 1993 unit)	Flxible	Metro-D; 40102-6C8		40	102	Transit (1000s); Suburban (3700s)		Cummins C8.3; ZF Ecomat 5HP590	1750–1965; 1976 (1976)	2009–2011
1994 (3700 was a 1993 unit)	Flxible	Metro-D; 40102-4D		40	102	Transit (1000s); Suburban (3700s)		Detroit Diesel Series 50 DDEC; ZF Ecomat 5HP590	1966–1975	2009–2011
1995–1996	Nova Bus	RTS-06; T80-206		40	102	Transit		Cummins C8.3; ZF Ecomat 5HP590	2601–2775 (2625)	2011–2012
1997, 1999-2000 (leased 2006-2007)	MCI	102-DL3		45	102	Suburban		Detroit Diesel Series 60; Allison B500R Gen III	7101-7120	2008
1998	Orion	06.501 Low-Floor Hybrid		40	102	Transit		Detroit Diesel Series 30; Lockheed Martin HybriDrive	4000-4003 (4000, by MTA)	Never ran, became NYCTA 6350–6353
1998	Nova Bus	RTS-06; T80-2N		40	102	Transit		Cummins ISC; ZF Ecomat 5HP590	1001, 1026	2012–2013
1998–2000	MCI	102-DWA3 (CNG)		40	102	Suburban		Detroit Diesel Series 60G DDEC; Allison B500R Gen III	7001-7077	2014–2015
1999–2000	Nova Bus	RTS-06 RT60-2N		30	102	Transit		Cummins ISC; ZF Ecomat 5HP590	2501–2580 (2501, 2527)	2013–2017
1999–2000	Nova Bus	RTS-06 RT80-2N		40	102	Transit		Cummins ISC; ZF Ecomat 5HP590	1000; 1002–1025; 1027–1254; 1262–1576 (1513)	2013–2017
2000	Nova Bus	RTS-06 RT80-2N		40	102	Transit		Cummins ISC; ZF Ecomat 5HP592C	1577–1582	2013–2017
2000	Motor Coach Industries	102-DW3SS		40	102	Suburban		Detroit Diesel Series 60 DDEC (with Jacobs engine brake); Allison B500	7501-7503 (7502)	2020
2001 (acquired 2006 from Academy Bus)	Nova Bus	RTS-06 82VN		40	102	Suburban		Cummins ISC; ZF Ecomat 5HP592C	1583–1589	2013–2017
2001–2003	Motor Coach Industries	D4000	8409 66 8989 163 8514 Community Coach	40	102	Suburban		Detroit Diesel Series 60 DDEC (with Jacobs engine brake); Allison B500	7401-7418; 7484-7493; 7504-7683; 7686-7801; 7810-8112; 8269-8291; 8401-8435; 8451-8523; 8554-8559; 8563-8626; 8632-8686; 8703-8745; 8755-8759; 8775-8787; 8836-8889; 8916-8920; 8971-8990	2017–2023
2001–2003	Motor Coach Industries	D4500	8950 Wall Street	45	102	Suburban		Detroit Diesel Series 60 DDEC (with Jacobs engine brake); Allison B500	7419-7483; 8200-8268; 8292-8322; 8436-8450; 8524-8553; 8560-8562; 8627-8631; 8760-8774; 8788-8835; 8890-8915; 8921-8950; 8961-8968 (8316)	2017–2021
2002	Nova Bus	RTS-06 82VN hybrid		40	102	Transit		Cummins ISB; ISE ThunderVolt TB-40 hybrid system	4001-4003	2011
2002–2003	Motor Coach Industries	D4000H hybrid		40	102	Suburban		Cummins ISL; Allison EP-50 HybriDrive	4004-4007	2018
2002–2003	Motor Coach Industries	D4000N		40	96	Suburban		Detroit Diesel Series 60 DDEC; Allison B500	7802-7805	2016
2003–2004	Neoplan	AN459		59	102	Transit (9500s); Suburban (9600s)		Caterpillar C9; ZF Ecomat-2 5HP602C	9501-9549; 9601-9636	2020–2021
2006	MTS	RTS Legend		40	102	Transit (4100s); Suburban (4201)		Caterpillar C9; ZF Ecomat 6HP592C	4101-4132; 4201	2007 (Note: 4102-4132 never ran); Sold to Somerset County, Texas A&M University, & Foxwoods Casino
2006	Motor Coach Industries	D4500CL		Suburban	102	45 feet (14 m)		Caterpillar C13 ACERT & Allison B500R	9001–9053	2024
2008	Motor Coach Industries	D4500CL		Suburban	102	45		Caterpillar C13; Allison B500	7121-7187 (7135)	2018–2024
2008-2009	Motor Coach Industries	D4500CT		Suburban	102	45		Caterpillar C13; Allison B500	7101-7118	2024; Sold to MTA
2012–2013	DesignLine	EcoCoach CNG		Suburban	102	45		Cummins Westport ISL G ZF EcoLife 6AP1700B	7201-7214	2015 (stored out of service) (Note: 7203 never ran and was instead used as an engineering test bus)
