= Number 22 Hillside LLC/Corp =

Bus transportation

Number 22 Hillside LLC was a subsidiary of Academy Bus Lines that operated numerous bus routes in Hudson County, New Jersey.

== Formation ==
Number 22 Hillside LLC was formed after Red and Tan in Hudson County (A brand of Olympia Trails which in turn is a Coach USA Subsidiary) shut down their operations in 2011. NJ Transit gave Academy a dedicated fleet of buses for the operation.

== Routes ==
The following routes operated by Number 22 Hillside LLC were the, 2, 10, 22 (As well as the 22X variant), 23, 88, and 119. Most of these routes mirrored most of the former routes of Red and Tan in Hudson County.

== Fleet ==
Before the dissolution of Number 22 Hillside LLC, the following model of buses was operated:

- NABI 40-SFW/416.15

Model of buses retired before the dissolution were:

- Nova Bus RTS

== Dissolution ==
In June 2021 it was announced that Coach USA, under their Olympia Trails subsidiary would assume operations of the routes that were currently being operated by Number 22 Hillside LLC, this time under the ONE/Independent Bus Co brand, by the end of the month. This comes after NJ Transit suing Academy Bus Lines (Parent company of Number 22 Hillside LLC) for defrauding them and missing bus trips. The last day for Number 22 Hillside LLC and its operations was June 25, 2021.

== See also ==
- NJ Transit
- Academy Bus Lines
- Coach USA
- Olympia Trails
