= Wayne Route 23 Transit Center =

NJ Transit rail station

Wayne Route 23
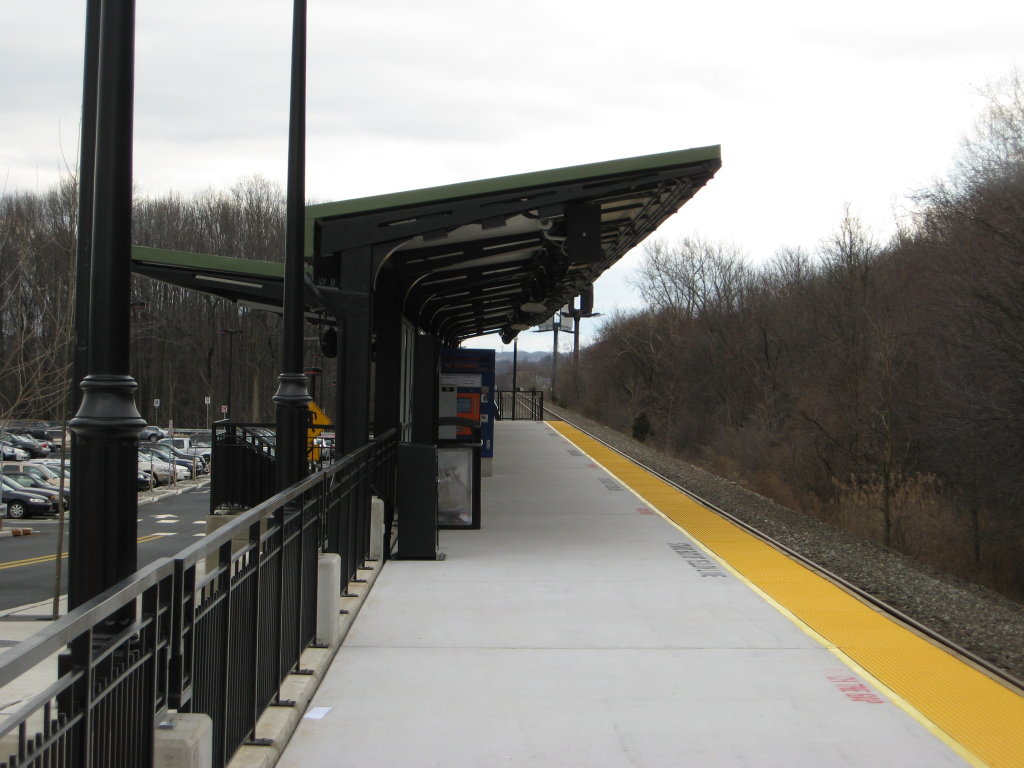
- Wayne Route 23 Transit Center's rail platform

General information
- Coordinates: 40.8993°N 74.2561°W
- Owner: NJ Transit
- Platforms: 1 side platform
- Tracks: 1
- Connections: NJT Bus: 194, 198, 324, 748

Construction
- Parking: 1100
- Accessible: Yes

Other information
- Fare zone: 9 (train) and 6 (bus)

History
- Opened: January 12, 2008

Passengers
- 2025: 62 (average weekday)
- Rank: 132 of 153

Services
Preceding station	NJ Transit	Following station
Mountain View toward Hackettstown	Montclair–Boonton Line limited service	Little Falls toward New York or Hoboken
Location

The Wayne Route 23 Transit Center is a mass transportation hub located in Wayne, New Jersey, USA. Operated by NJ Transit, the complex consists of two major components. One is a bus terminal that provides service to Port Authority Bus Terminal, Newark Penn Station, and intermediate points in the surrounding area. The other is a train platform that is connected to the Montclair–Boonton Line and offers service to Hoboken Terminal, connecting service to New York Penn Station, and local service to points between Montclair State University and Hackettstown. It is located off of the southbound lanes of New Jersey Route 23 on West Belt Road, near the interchange where Route 23, I-80, and US 46 meet, across from the Willowbrook Mall. The station opened in January 2008 and has 1,000 parking spaces.

New Jersey Transit intends for this combined rail and bus station to become an "interceptor station," that will help relieve the habitual congestion at the West Belt Road Interchange, where the three major highways meet. In addition, the construction of the station was meant also to ease congestion at what was then Route 23 Park & Ride, a bus depot on Route 23 north that has since been renamed Mother's Park & Ride, and the Willowbrook Mall Park & Ride; the now-Mother's site had limited parking while NJT was having trouble with overfull parking areas at Willowbrook.

== History ==
The New Jersey Transit project description dated November 2005 stated that the agency would be advertising for a construction contract beginning in March 2006 for "off-site road improvements." Preliminary construction during July and August 2006.

On September 13, 2006, New Jersey Transit's Board of Directors formally awarded the contract to construct this facility. Construction began in the fall of 2006 to finish in early 2008.

In December 2007, it was announced that the station would open to bus service on Saturday, January 12, 2008, with rail service beginning Monday January 14, 2008.

In March 2008, Wayne Route 23, along with the park and ride lots at Willowbrook Mall, Mother's Park & Ride, and Allwood Road Park & Ride in Clifton began charging customers to park. Parking passes are available at ticket machines on the rail and bus platforms at the station; daily and monthly passes are available. The Wayne bus garage is located on the opposite side of Route 23. There has been a proposal to build a parking deck with another 1,000 spots and develop the land at the station.

== Station layout and services ==
In addition to Montclair-Boonton trains, the Transit Center is served by the following New Jersey Transit bus lines:

- 194 to Port Authority Bus Terminal and Butler/Newfoundland
- 198 to Port Authority Bus Terminal and William Paterson University
- 324 to and from Port Authority Bus Terminal
- 748 to Willowbrook Mall and Paterson
