= List of NJ Transit bus routes (100–199) =

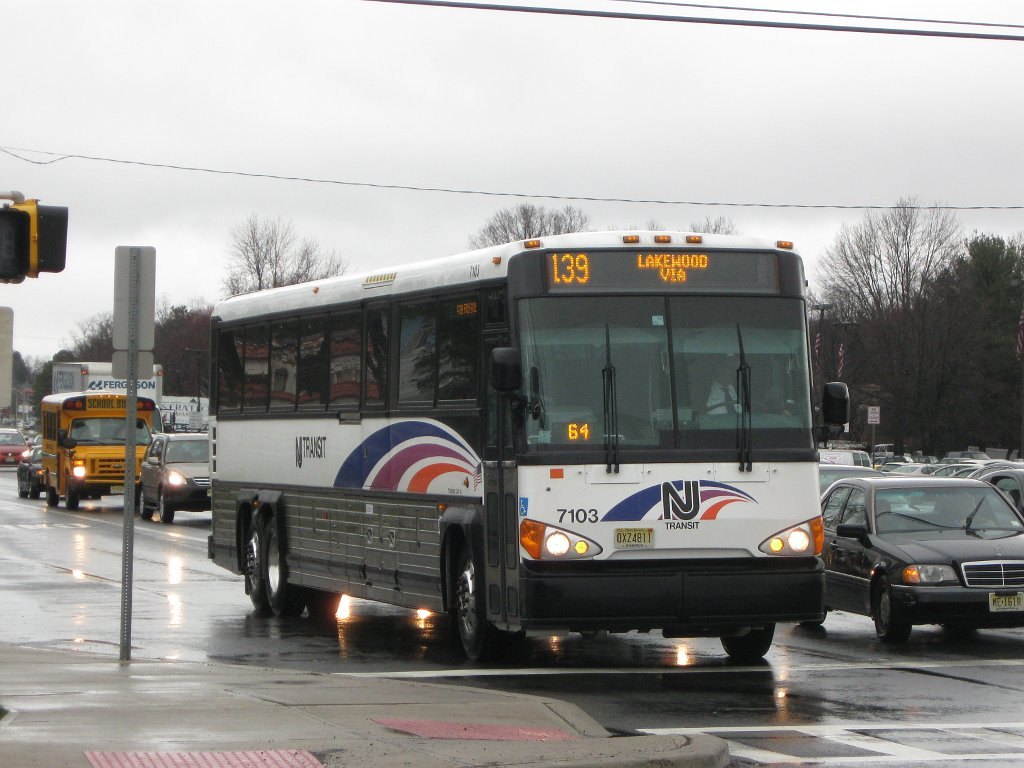
#7103 on the 139 express line via Route 9 in Old Bridge

New Jersey Transit operates interstate bus routes running to various locations in Manhattan in New York City. Most serve the Port Authority Bus Terminal (PABT) in Midtown; the remainder serve the George Washington Bridge Bus Terminal in Washington Heights or run in the streets of Lower Manhattan.

The list below is sorted by division, New York terminal, the New Jersey region served, major streets, general operational details (e.g. variations, express services, short turns, operating hours), history, and garages where the routes are based. Unless otherwise noted, routes labeled "Weekday rush hours only" run to New York during the AM rush and to New Jersey during the PM rush.

During morning rush hour, many PABT-bound routes use the Lincoln Tunnel express bus lane (XBL), a dedicated reversible lane that travels eastbound along Route 495. There is no westbound XBL during the evening rush hour.

Many PABT routes make stops along 30th and 31st Streets in Union City rather than running nonstop on Route 495. Routes labeled "Serves Union City" are frequently scheduled to do this. This label is not used for routes which make local stops in Union City anywhere other than 30th and 31st Streets.

== Northern Division ==
Northern Division routes serve points in Hudson, Bergen, and Passaic counties in New Jersey, as well as in Orange County in New York.

=== From Lower Manhattan ===
Route	Terminal	Major Streets	Operations	History	Garage(s)
120	Bayonne	Avenue C, Church Street and Trinity Place	Weekday rush hours only	Began service in 1990 as a variant of 81; originally route 81A	Greenville

=== From GWB Bus Station and GWB Plaza ===
Route	Terminal	Major streets	Notes	History	Garage(s)
171	Paterson Broadway Bus Terminal	Route 4, Garden State Plaza, Broadway	Sunday service bypasses Garden State Plaza.	Inter City Transportation Company, a Maplewood Equipment Company subsidiary (1933) 40	Market Street
175	Ridgewood Bus Terminal	Route 4, Cedar Lane, Passaic Street, Garden State Plaza, Bergen Community College	Sunday service bypasses Garden State Plaza and Bergen Community College.	Garden State Bus Lines (1935) as 45	Market Street
178	Hackensack Bus Terminal	Route 4, Grand Avenue, Forest Avenue, Englewood Avenue		Acquired by Public Service Coordinated Transport (1939); Former 78 line	Market Street
181	Union City; Bergenline Avenue Station	Palisade Avenue, Bergenline Avenue	No Sunday service	Public Service Coordinated Transport (1937) as Hudson Division 21; Became 98 when extended over George Washington Bridge (1951); Streetcar line from Hoboken to Fort Lee (1937 to 1947); Shortened to Bergenline Avenue Station on April 8, 2006.; Sunday service discontinued on September 1, 2012.	Meadowlands
182	Hackensack Bus Terminal	Main Street, Degraw Avenue		Public Service Coordinated Transport (1931) as 82	Market Street
186	Dumont; Chestnut Bend	Sylvan Avenue, Palisade Avenue, Washington Avenue		Public Service Coordinated Transport (1936) as 86	Market Street
188	West New York	River Road, Anthony M. Defino Way, 60th Street		Public Service Coordinated Transport as Bergen Division route 8 (1926); extended over GWB (1950)	Meadowlands

=== To Hudson County from PABT ===
Route	Terminal	Major points	Notes	History	Garage
119	Bayonne	Central Avenue, JFK Boulevard	Serves Journal Square late nights.	Replaced Red & Tan 99S on November 7, 2011.; Sunday service began in December 2019.; Operated by Academy Bus until 2021, then Coach USA until June 2022 when it was transferred to NJ Transit.	Meadowlands; Kearny Point; Greenville
121	North Bergen	32nd Street, West Side Avenue	Weekday rush hours only (AM to North Bergen, PM to New York)	Began service by NJ Transit in 1986	Meadowlands
122	Secaucus Cul-de-sac	Paterson Plank Road	Weekday rush hours only	Previously the 190 Cul-De-Sac service, renumbered to 122 on June 26, 2010.	Meadowlands; Wayne
123	Jersey City; Christ Hospital	Palisade Avenue, 9th Street-Congress Street Station	One A.M. trip serves Troy Towers in Union City and is signed as 123T.	Originally operated by Hudson Bus Transportation Company as the 3.; Service to Troy Towers and The Lenox discontinued on June 20, 2026, then Troy Towers service was added back as one A.M. trip on September 5, 2026.; Extended to Christ Hospital on April 5, 2008.	Meadowlands
124	Secaucus Junction	County Avenue, Secaucus Road, Castle Road	Weekday rush hours and Saturday mornings only (AM to Secaucus, PM to New York); Serves Union City.	Began service by NJ Transit in 1998 as a variant of 129	Meadowlands
125	Jersey City; Journal Square	John F. Kennedy Boulevard		Originally operated by North Boulevard Transportation Company as 5	Meadowlands
126	Hoboken Terminal	Washington Street	Select weekday rush hour trips run via Willow Avenue in Hoboken and/or terminate at Hamilton Park in Jersey City.	Originally Public Service Coordinated Transport (1939) as 62 Hoboken - New York via Willow/Clinton & 63 Hoboken - New York via Washington Street	Greenville; Meadowlands; Hilton; Howell; Ironbound; Kearny Point
128	North Bergen; Nungessers	Boulevard East	Operates daily during rush hours (AM to New York, PM to North Bergen).	Service began in 1992 as a short run of 166 to ease overcrowding.	Fairview; Meadowlands; Howell; Ironbound
129	Secaucus Junction	Front Street, Meadowlands Parkway, Seaview Drive	Serves Union City.; Express to Meadowlands Parkway (129X) runs on weekday rush hours only.	Originally Hudson Bus Transportation Company as 6; The former AB and C variants were absorbed into the regular 129 schedule in 2010.	Meadowlands

=== To Hudson, Bergen, and Passaic counties from PABT ===
Route	Terminal	Major points	Notes	History	Garage
127	Ridgefield	Bergen Turnpike, Tonnelle Avenue Station, Tonelle Avenue, Broad Avenue	Select weekday rush hour trips run via Shaler Boulevard in Ridgefield and are signed as 127X to New York and 127L to Ridgefield.; Select trips short turn in Fairview.	Originally Public Service Coordinated Transport in 1939 as 67; Formerly operated 127S nonstop service to Tonnelle Avenue and terminated at Shaler Blvd; was discontinued June 22, 2019.	Oradell
144	Elmwood Park	Moonachie Avenue, Essex Street, Route 4	Weekday rush hours only; Peak direction service operates express to Elmwood Park.; Reverse peak service operates via Teterboro and Union City.	Began service under NJ Transit in 1996 as a variant of 164	Oradell
145	Fair Lawn	Century Road, Morlot Avenue	Weekday rush hours only	Began service in January 2001 as a variant of 164.	Wayne
148	Midland Park	Route 208, Goffle Road	Weekday rush hours only	Began service under NJT in 1996 as a variant of 164	Wayne
151	Paterson	U.S. 46, Vreeland Avenue, Park Avenue	Weekday rush hours only	Former 161T Turnpike Express; renumbered 151 on April 3, 2010.	Wayne
153	Fairview; NJT Garage	Anderson Avenue, NJ Turnpike	Weekday rush hours only	Formerly 159T Turnpike Express; renumbered 153 on April 3, 2010.	Fairview
154	Fort Lee	John F. Kennedy Boulevard, Bergen Boulevard	Weekday rush hour trips bypass Nungessers and are signed as 154X.	Originally Hudson Bus Transportation Company as Route 4; Sunday service added on April 3, 2021.	Fairview
155	Teaneck	Main Street, Palisade Avenue, River Road	Weekday rush hours only	Introduced by NJT in 1996 as a variant of 168	Westwood
156	Englewood Cliffs	Park Avenue, Bergenline Avenue, Nungessers, Palisade Avenue, GWB Plaza, Sylvan Avenue	Express via River Road and Gorge Road (156R) operates weekday rush hours and Saturdays only.	Combination of former Maplewood Equipment Company routes 6 and 10, and Transport of New Jersey route 61; Service via Boulevard East discontinued in the early 1990's.; "BR" Bergenline Avenue and River Road service was discontinued on August 31, 2002.	Fairview; Meadowlands
157	Teaneck	Teaneck Road, Bergen Turnpike, Cedar Lane	Weekday rush hours only	Introduced by NJT in 1996 as a variant of 168	Westwood
158	Fort Lee; Med West	Weehawken Port Imperial, River Road, Main Street	Select rush hour trips terminate at Hudson Terrace at Myrtle Avenue and are signed as 158M.	Originally Maplewood Equipment Company as the 8, then renumbered as 98 operated by TNJ	Fairview; Meadowlands; Howell
159	Fort Lee; Linwood Park	Bergenline Avenue, Nungessers, Anderson Avenue, GWB Plaza	Express via River Road and Gorge Road (159R) operates weekday rush hours and Saturdays only.; 60th Street Express (159X) operates weekday rush hours only.; Select trips short turn at the Fairview NJT Garage.; Select late night trips terminate at Winston Towers in Cliffside Park or Route 5.	"BR" Bergenline Avenue and River Road service was discontinued on August 31, 2002.; Originally Maplewood Equipment Company as the 7, 9, and 9X	Fairview; Meadowlands
160	Elmwood Park	Meadowlands Sports Complex, Paterson Avenue, Midland Avenue	Serves Union City.; Weekday rush hour trips bypass Meadowlands Sports Complex and Union City.	Began service by NJT in 1987 as a variant of 164	Wayne
161	Paterson	Washington Avenue, U.S. 46	Serves Union City.; Select weekday rush hour trips terminate at Passaic Bus Terminal.	Originally Manhattan Transit Company as 51, 52, and 53, which were the only routes for this company	Wayne
162	Paramus	Prospect Avenue, Passaic Street	Weekday rush hours only	Began service by NJ Transit in 1992 as variant of 163	Oradell
163	Ridgewood	Boulevard, Passaic Street, Paramus Road, Ridgewood Avenue	Serves Union City.; Select weekday rush hour trips serve Veterans Boulevard in Rutherford.; Select trips serve Garden State Plaza and/or IKEA in Paramus.	Originally Garden State Bus Lines, a Maplewood Equipment Company subsidiary in 1927 as 35; a variant of the 164	Oradell
164	Midland Park	Boulevard, Essex Street, Morlot Avenue, Saddle River Road, Ridgewood Bus Terminal		Originally Garden State Bus Lines in 1927 as the 35E; a variant of 163	Oradell; Wayne
165	Westwood	Boulevard East, Nungessers, Broad Avenue, Hudson Street, State Street, Kinderkamack Road	Turnpike Express (165T) operates on weekdays and Saturdays only.; All other express variants (165R, 165P, 165RF/PF) operate weekday rush hours only.; Select reverse peak local trips run via Teterboro.	Originally Public Service Coordinated Transport (1939); Extended within Westwood to Pascack Valley Medical Center in 2023.	Westwood
166	Cresskill	Boulevard East, Nungessers, Broad Avenue, Dean and Engle Streets, Washington Avenue	Turnpike Express (166T) operates mainly during weekday rush hours with limited off-peak and weekend service.; I-95 Express (166X) operates weekday rush hours only.	Originally Public Service Coordinated Transport (1939)	Oradell; Meadowlands
167	Harrington Park	Teaneck Road, Washington Avenue	Operates service via either Challenger Road and Queen Anne Road (167Q) or directly via Teaneck Road (167T).; Select trips terminate in New Milford.; Sunday service is truncated to Dumont (Chestnut Bend).	Originally Public Service Coordinated Transport (1939)	Westwood; Meadowlands
168	Paramus Park	Boulevard East, Nungessers, Broad Avenue, Queen Anne Road, Cedar Lane, Bergen Town Center	Turnpike Express (168T) operates weekday rush hours only.; Sunday service is truncated to Bergen Town Center.	Originally Public Service Coordinated Transport (1946)	Westwood
177	Harrington Park	Teaneck Road, Washington Avenue	Weekday rush hours only; Express between New York and Teaneck Armory; Select trips terminate in New Milford.	Former 167X Armory Express, renumbered to 177 on April 3, 2010.	Oradell; Meadowlands; Westwood

=== To Passaic County and Orange County, New York from PABT ===
Route	Terminal	Major streets	Notes	History	Garage
190	Paterson	Paterson Plank Road, Orient Way, Union Avenue, Main Avenue/Main Street	Rutherford Express (190R) and Paterson Express (190X) operate weekday rush hours only.; Select trips operate via Delawanna and Passaic Avenue.; Serves Union City.; 24-hour service	Originally Inter City Transportation Company (1933) as 30	Meadowlands; Wayne
191	Willowbrook Mall	Allwood Road, Long Hill Road, Main Street	Serves Union City on weekends.; Weekend trips bypass Montclair Heights station.	Originally Public Service Coordinated Transport (1948)	Wayne
192	Clifton	Rutherford Avenue, Kingsland Avenue, Allwood Road	Serves Union City.; Select weekday rush hour trips serve Chubb Road in Lyndhurst.	Originally Public Service Coordinated Transport (1948)	Wayne
193	Willowbrook Mall	Runs nonstop to Willowbrook Mall.	Weekday rush hours only	Service via Alps Road and Totowa Road discontinued on June 26, 2010 due to budget crisis.	Wayne
194	Newfoundland or Stockholm	Willowbrook Mall, Wayne Route 23 Transit Center, Newark-Pompton Turnpike, Hamburg Turnpike, Route 23	All express services (194T, 194P, 194X, and 194E) operate weekday rush hours only.; 194E trips terminate in Stockholm.; Seasonal service operates to Mountain Creek Ski Resort.	North East Coach Lines (InterCity Transportation Co); Service to Wayne Route 23 Transit Center began on January 12, 2008. Select trips bypassing the transit center, signed as 194P, were introduced on April 11, 2009.	Wayne
195	Willowbrook Mall	Allwood Road, Ridge Road, Newark-Pompton Turnpike	Serves Union City on weekends.	Originally Public Service Coordinated Transport (1948)	Wayne
196	Warwick, NY	Ringwood Park and Ride, NY Route 210, NY Route 17A	Weekday rush hours only		Wayne
197	Warwick, NY	Willowbrook Mall, Valley Road, Ringwood Avenue, Ringwood Park and Ride, NY Route 210, NY Route 17A	Service via Black Oak Ridge Road and Totowa Road (197BT) operates during weekday rush hours only.	Service via Black Oak Ridge Road rerouted via Alps Road on June 26, 2010.; 197B and 197T combined into 197BT on August 30, 2025.	Wayne
198	Wayne William Paterson University	Willowbrook Mall, Wayne Route 23 Transit Center, Valley Road		Began service on January 12, 2008.	Wayne
199	Clifton	Rutherford Avenue, Kingsland Avenue, Allwood Road	Weekday rush hours only; Operates local service during rush hour while 192 runs express.	Introduced by NJ Transit in 2010 as variant of 192	Wayne

== Central Division ==
Central Division routes go to points south of the Essex/Passaic county line, and west of the Passaic River.

=== To Essex County from PABT ===
Route	Terminals	Major streets	Notes	History	Garage
101	West Orange	Valley Road, Park Street, Harrison Avenue	Weekday rush hours only	Originally the 191D route from April 2023 to September 2023 providing service along the former DeCamp Route 66. Renumbered to 101 on September 2, 2023.	Wayne
102	Bloomfield	Passaic Avenue, Broad Street	Weekday rush hours only	Originally the 192D route from April 2023 to September 2023 providing service along the former DeCamp Route 33. Renumbered to 102 on September 2, 2023.	Ironbound
105	West Caldwell	Ridge Road, Pompton Avenue, Bloomfield Avenue	Weekday rush hours only	Originally the 195D route from April 2023 to September 2023 providing service along the former DeCamp Route 33. Renumbered to 105 on September 2, 2023.	Wayne
107	South Orange	Lyons Avenue, Irvington Bus Terminal, Clinton Avenue, Irvington Avenue, Ivy Hill Loop	Select trips serve Newark Liberty International Airport.; Express (107X) operates mostly on weekdays with limited weekend service.; Select trips serve Union City.	Introduced by Transport of New Jersey in 1946	Hilton
108	Newark	7th Avenue, Raymond Boulevard	Serves Union City.	Introduced by Transport of New Jersey in 1928; formerly Route 118	Hilton
109	Newark or Harrison	Ridge Road, Belleville Turnpike, Mount Prospect Avenue	Weekday rush hours only; Trips operate via either North Newark or Harrison and are signed as 109D and 109K.	Originally the 199D and 199K routes from April 2023 (199D) and June 2023 (199K) to September 2023, providing service along the former DeCamp Route 44. Renumbered to 109 on September 2, 2023.	Ironbound

=== To points in the Raritan Valley from PABT ===
Route	Terminal	Major streets	Notes	History	Garage
111	Jersey Gardens Mall	North Avenue	Runs to Jersey Gardens Mall in the morning and to New York in the evening.; Serves Union City.	Split off from the 112 on April 15, 2000.	Ironbound
112	Clark or Roselle	North Avenue, Broad Street, Jersey Avenue, Raritan Road		Introduced by Somerset Bus Company in 1926 as the 15 and the 111; Service to Jersey Gardens split off into the 111 on April 15, 2000.	Ironbound
113	Dunellen	Salem Road, North Avenue, Route 28	Trips operate via either North Avenue or Salem Road and are signed as 113N and 113S.; Parkway Express (113X) operates weekday rush hours only.	Introduced by Somerset Bus Company in 1946 as the 143 and 222.	Ironbound
114	Bridgewater Commons	Morris Avenue, Mountain Avenue, U.S. Route 22, Watchung Avenue, Route 28	Express (114X) operates weekday rush hours and Saturdays only.	Formerly route 148.; Formerly ran to Clinton, service between Somerville and Clinton split off as the 884 in 1994.	Ironbound
115	Rahway	Jersey Gardens Mall, Route 27	One trip per day in each direction operates via Elizabeth Avenue in Linden.; Service operating on Sunday is part of a pilot program effective June 27, 2021.	Introduced by Transport of New Jersey in 1957 as the 135	Ironbound
116	Perth Amboy	Roosevelt Avenue, Port Reading Avenue, Convery Boulevard		Introduced by Transport of New Jersey in 1958; formerly part of the 139	Ironbound
117	Somerville	U.S. Route 22	Weekday rush hours only	Introduced by NJ Transit in 1991 as a variant of the 114.	Ironbound

=== To points south of the Raritan River from PABT ===
These routes are assigned to the Howell Garage in Howell. with some rush hour service on some lines operated by Academy Bus. All routes operate during weekday peak hours only, except for the 126, 137 and 139.

Route	Terminal	Major streets	Notes	History	Garage
130	Howell or Lakewood	U.S. Route 9	Weekday PM rush hour only; Express between New York and Union Hill Park & Ride	Former 139 Union Hill Park & Ride Express, renumbered to 130 on April 3, 2010.; Service via Pease Road discontinued and replaced by Microlink pilot program on April 6, 2026.	Howell
131	Sayreville or Freehold	Ernston Road, Route 79	Weekday rush hours only; Select trips continue to Freehold.	Introduced by NJ Transit in 1991	Howell
132	Lakewood	U.S. Route 9	Weekday rush hours only; Express between New York and Gordon's Corner	Former 139 Gordon's Corner Express, renumbered to 132 on April 3, 2010.; Service via Stillwells Corner Road discontinued and replaced by Microlink pilot program on April 6, 2026.	Howell
133	Old Bridge	Route 34 or Route 516	Weekday rush hours only	Introduced by NJ Transit in 1983 as a variant of 139; Service to Marlboro and Freehold split off into 135 in 1991	Howell
135	Freehold Center	Route 79	Weekday rush hours only	Introduced in NJ Transit in 1991; incorporates the former 133 line to Freehold	Howell
136	Lakewood	U.S. Route 9	Weekday PM rush hour only; Express between New York and Freehold Mall	Former 139 Freehold Mall Express, renumbered to 136 on April 3, 2010.	Howell
137	Toms River	Garden State Parkway	Nonstop from New York to Toms River.; Service via County Route 549 operates weekday rush hours only; select trips serve Lakewood Bus Terminal.; Seasonal service operates to Seaside Park.	Introduced by NJ Transit in 1983 as a short turn of the 319	Howell
138	Old Bridge or Monroe	Route 18, Ferry Road, Summerhill Road, Spotswood-Englishtown Road	Weekday rush hours only	Introduced by NJ Transit in 1983 as a variant of 139	Howell
139	Lakewood	U.S. Route 9, Freehold Center	Service operates via either Freehold Center or Freehold Mall.; Service via Englishtown (139E) operates weekday rush hours only.; 24-hour service	Introduced by Transport of New Jersey in 1958; The portion from Port Authority to Perth Amboy split off into the 116 in 1958.; Service via Pease Road and Stillwells Corner Road discontinued and replaced by Microlink pilot program on April 6, 2026.	Howell

== Former routes ==
This list includes routes that have been renumbered, are now operated by private companies, or have been discontinued.

Route	Terminals		Major streets	Current status
84	Oradell	GWB Bus Station	U.S. Route 9W	Unknown when discontinued; most likely discontinued in the 1970s.
108X	Newark Colonnade Park Apartments	PABT	I-280	Discontinued on June 24, 2006.
132 (first use)	Freehold	PABT	Route 516, Route 527	Absorbed into route 139.
134	Old Bridge Browntown	Wall Street	Route 18, Route 516	Discontinued in June 2010 due to budget crisis.
136 (first use)	Lakewood	Wall Street	U.S. Route 9	Route sold to Academy Bus.
156T	Cliffside Park Winston Towers	PABT	NJ Turnpike, I-95	Discontinued on January 4, 2003.
162 (first use)	Passaic	PABT	U.S Route 46	Absorbed into route 161.
186R	Dumont; Chestnut Bend	GWB Bus Station	Route 4, Teaneck Road, Washington Avenue	Discontinued on January 3, 2009.

== See also ==
- Bus rapid transit in New Jersey
