= NJ Transit Bus Operations =

Public transport operator in New Jersey

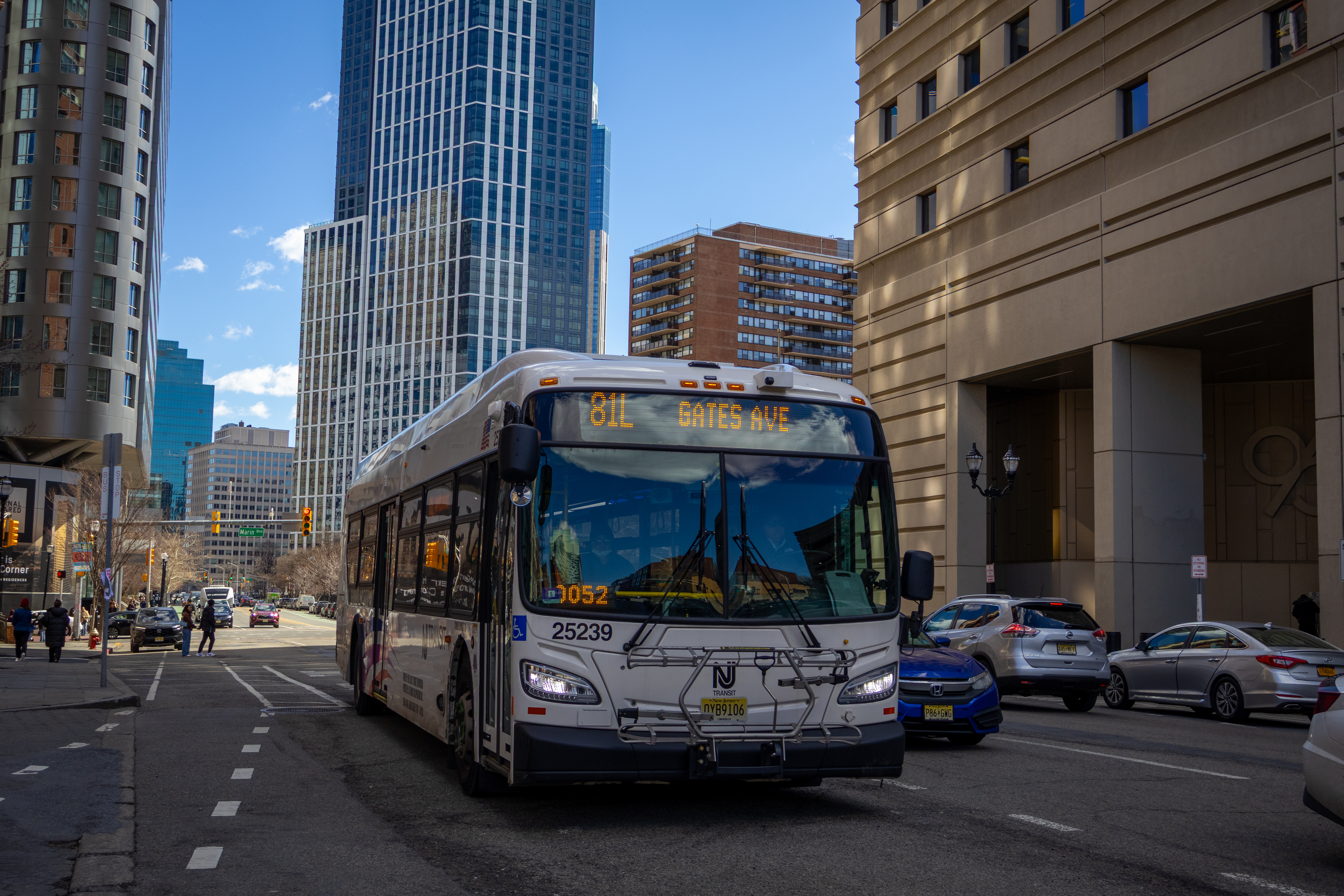
- NJ Transit bus operates along Christopher Columbus Av in Jersey City, New Jersey.
- Parent: NJ Transit
- Founded: 1980 (purchase of Transport of New Jersey)
- Headquarters: Newark, New Jersey
- Service area: New Jersey (statewide)
- Service type: Local and commuter bus transit, Newark Light Rail
- Routes: 268 (See list below)
- Stations: 26 bus terminals, 19,500 bus stops, 17 light rail stations
- Fleet: 3,052 buses, 696 leased to private operators 21 light rail vehicles
- Annual ridership: 136,295,400 (2025)
- Operator: See operator list below
- Chief executive: Kris Kolluri
- Website: njtransit.com

NJ Transit Bus Operations is the bus division of NJ Transit, providing local and commuter bus service throughout New Jersey and adjacent areas of New York State (Manhattan in New York City, Rockland County, and Orange County) and Pennsylvania (Philadelphia and the Lehigh Valley). It operates its own lines as well as contracts others to private carriers. In 2025, the bus system had a ridership of 136,295,400.

== History ==
Prior to 1948, most public transportation in New Jersey was provided by the Public Service Corporation of New Jersey, a utility company that also operated the Public Service Railway division. In 1948, the Public Service Corporation was divided into two entities: the Public Service Electric and Gas Company, which inherited the utility operations, and the Public Service Coordinated Transportation Company (PSCT), which inherited the transit operations. PSCT provided service throughout New Jersey, originally using trolleys and then transitioning to trolley buses, and buses. During the 1970s, the New Jersey Department of Transportation began funding the routes of Public Service, now renamed Transport of New Jersey (TNJ), contracting with TNJ and other companies to operate local bus service throughout New Jersey.

NJ Transit came into being as the result of the New Jersey Public Transportation Act of 1979 to "acquire, operate, and contract for transportation services in the public interest". NJ Transit Bus Operations came into being the following year, when it acquired Transport of New Jersey from PSE&G. Other purchases and buyouts in the 1980s expanded the bus division of NJ Transit, including the assumption of service for Somerset Bus Company in 1982 and the acquisition of the Atlantic City Transportation Company in 1987. In 1992 NJ Transit Mercer, Inc., which was the successor to the former "Mercer Metro" operation that NJ Transit took over in 1984 for the Trenton and Princeton areas, was folded into NJ Transit Bus Operations. In 2010, PABCO Transit (Passaic-Athenia Bus) taken over under the subsidiary NJ Transit Morris, Inc.

Following the COVID-19 pandemic in New Jersey numerous private carriers went out of business and NJ Transit took over many of their routes, including those of Olympia Trails subsidiaries (ONE Bus, Red & Tan in Hudson County), A&C Bus Corporation, DeCamp Bus Lines, and Transdev.

== Routes ==
Routes are numbered by where they operate in the state of New Jersey, however, there are a few exceptions to the general rule due to subsequent changes to some routes operating in Central and North Jersey. Fare and route can also be further elucidated on some of the individual route schedules or the trip planner.

- 1-99: Intrastate service originating from Newark, Jersey City, Hoboken, or Elizabeth.
- 100-199: Routes from central and northern New Jersey to New York City.
- 200-299: No routes with these numbers; a few existed in the 1980s but were soon renumbered.
- 300-399: Special-event and park services, school tripper services, park-and-ride services, long-distance suburban routes from Philadelphia, New York-Atlantic City express. Beginning in 2010, numbers in this series are also assigned to North Jersey intrastate routes formerly suffixed with an X.
- 400-449: Short-distance suburban routes in southwestern New Jersey and to Philadelphia.
- 450-499: Local routes within Camden, Gloucester, and Salem counties.
- 500-549: Local routes within Atlantic and Cape May counties.
- 550-599: Long-distance routes from Atlantic City serving points in southern New Jersey and Philadelphia.
- 600-699: Local routes within Mercer County.
- 700-799: Local routes within Passaic and Bergen counties not running to Newark.
- 800-880: Local routes within Middlesex, Monmouth, and Morris counties not running to Newark.
- Wheels Suburban Transportation Services (890 and up).

In most cases, routes retain the same numbers they had under the Public Service/Transport of New Jersey umbrella.

== Fleet ==
As of 2024 NJ Transit had over 2800 buses, including 147 compressed natural gas (CNG) buses and 12 hybrid electric buses, as well as community shuttles.

== Divisions and facilities ==
NJ Transit Bus Operations is divided into the Northern, Central, and Southern Divisions, and contract operations.

=== Northern Division ===
The Northern Division consists of six garages.

Garage	Location	Routes	Notes
Fairview	419 Anderson Avenue, Fairview	128 (split with Meadowlands, Howell), 153, 154, 156 (split with Market Street, Meadowlands), 158 (split with Meadowlands, Howell), 159 (split with Market Street, Meadowlands)	
Market Street	16 Market Street, Paterson	72, 74, 156 (split with Fairview, Meadowlands), 159 (split with Fairview, Meadowlands), 171, 175, 178, 182, 186, 703, 704, 712, 770	
Meadowlands	2600 Penhorn Avenue, North Bergen	10 (splot with Greenville, Kearny Point), 22, 23, 82, 83, 84, 85, 86, 88, 89, 119 (split with Greenville, Kearny Point), 121, 122 (split with Wayne), 123, 124, 125, 126 (split with Greenville, Hilton, Ironbound), 128 (split with Fairview, Howell), 129, 156 (split with Fairview, Market Street), 159 (split with Fairview, Market Street), 166 (split with Oradell), 167 (split with Westwood), 177 (split with Westwood), 181, 188, 190 (split with Wayne), 319 (split with Egg Harbor, Howell), 320, 321 (split with Howell), 329, 355 (split with Ironbound)	Newly built garage replaced the old Union City Garage in 1993.
Oradell	Marginal Rd, Oradell	127, 144, 162, 163, 164 (split with Wayne), 166 (split with Meadowlands)	Replaced the old Bergenfield and Hackensack Garages in 1962.
Wayne	55 West Belt Parkway, Wayne	101, 105, 122 (split with Meadowlands), 145, 148, 151, 160, 161, 164 (split with Oradell) 190 (split with Meadowlands), 191, 192, 193, 194, 195, 196, 197, 198, 199, 324	Newly built garage that replaced the old Madison Ave garage in Paterson and the Warwick Garage in Warwick, New York in 1998.
Westwood	180 Old Hook Road, Westwood	155, 157, 165, 167 (split with Meadowlands), 168, 177 (split with Meadowlands)	Former Coach USA Rockland Coaches garage; Bought by NJT in 2022, to relieve congestion in Oradell; Service began for this garage on September 3, 2022

=== Central Division ===
The Central Division consists of eight garages and one light rail operations facility.

Garage	Location	Routes	Notes
Big Tree	1 Washington Avenue, Nutley	1 (split with Hilton, Orange),13 (split with Hilton), 27 (split with Hilton, Orange), 30, 40, 44, 76, 78, 99, 378	New garage opened in 1989; Built on the same site after the old Big Tree Garage was demolished.
Greenville	53 Old Bergen Road; Jersey City	6, 10 (split with Meadowlands, Kearny Point), 12, 16, 80, 81, 87, 119 (with Kearny Point, Meadowlands), 120, 126 (split with Hilton, Meadowlands, Ironbound)	New garage opened in 1998; Built on the same site after the old Greenville Garage was demolished.; Originally part of the Northern division until Westwood opening.
Hilton	1450 Springfield Avenue; Maplewood	1 (split with Big Tree, Ironbound, Orange), 13 (split with Big Tree), 24 (Split with Ironbound, Orange), 25, 26, 27 (split with Big Tree, Orange), 31, 37, 39, 52, 70, 90, 107, 108, 126 (split with Greenville, Ironbound, Meadowlands), 250 (go25), 361, 375	New garage opened in 1989, built on the same site after the old Maplewood Garage was demolished. Upgraded and electrification planned for 2025.
Howell	1251 U.S. 9, Howell Township; Howell	63, 64, 67, 68, 126 (split with Greenville, Hilton, Ironbound, Meadowlands), 128 (split with Meadowlands, Fairview), 130, 131, 132, 133, 135, 136, 137, 138, 139, 319 (split with Egg Harbor, Meadowlands)	Newly built garage that replaced the old garages in Lakewood and Old Bridge in 1985.
Ironbound	601 Doremus Ave, Newark	24 (Split with Hilton, Orange), 48, 56, 57, 58, 59, 62, 65, 66, 102, 109, 111, 112, 113, 114, 115, 116, 117, 119 (Split with Greenville, Meadowlands), 126 (Split with Greenville, Hilton, Kearny Point, Meadowlands), 355 (Split with Meadowlands)	Newly built garage and main shop complex replacing the old garages in Newark at Ferry Street Shops and Lake Street Shops, and the old Elizabeth garage in 1997.; Located next to Kearny Point Garage.; Kearny Point, opened on August 17, 2024. Formerly an abandoned factory, it was made into a garage for NJT when CoachUSA's ONE Bus stopped operations in 2024.
Kearny Point	677 Wilson Ave, Newark	2, 8, 9, 10 (Split with Greenville, Meadowlands), 14, 119 (Split with Greenville, Meadowlands), 126 (Split with Greenville, Hilton, Howell, Meadowlands), 986	Located next to Ironbound Garage.; Opened on August 17, 2024. Formerly an abandoned factory, it was made into a garage for NJT when CoachUSA's ONE Bus stopped operations in 2024.
Morris (NJ Transit Morris, Inc.)	34 Richboynton Road; Dover	871, 872, 873, 874, 875, 878, 880	
Newark Light Rail	Grove Street station Bloomfield	Newark Light Rail Newark Penn Station	Originally used for storage and maintenance until the Grove Street extension in June 2002, when a new shop and yard complex were opened.
Orange	420 Thomas Boulevard, Orange	1 (split with Hilton, Big Tree) 5, 11, 21, 24 (split with Ironbound, Hilton), 27 (split with Big Tree, Hilton), 28, 29, 31, 34, 41, 71, 73, 79, 92, 94, 96, 97, 258 (go28), 372	New garage opened in 1988; Built on the same site after the old Orange Garage was demolished, replaced Roseville and Lake St. Garages

=== Southern Division ===
The Southern Division consists of five garages.

Garage	Location	Routes	Notes
Egg Harbor	1431 Doughty Road, Egg Harbor	313 (split with Washington Twp), 315 (split with Washington Twp), 316 (split with Newton Av, Washington Twp), 319 (split with Howell, Meadowlands), 501, 502, 504, 505, 507, 508, 509, 510, 552, 553, 559	Newly built garage replaced the old Atlantic City, Inlet, and Wildwood Garages in 1998.
Hamilton Township (NJ Transit Mercer, Inc.)	600 Sloan Avenue, Hamilton	600, 601, 603, 605, 606, 607, 608, 609, 610, 611, 612, 613, 619, 624	Newly built garage next to the NJT's Hamilton Train Station replaced the old Mercer Metro Garage on East State Street in Trenton in 1998.
Neptune Garage	830 Old Corlies Avenue, Neptune City	830, 831, 832, 834, 836, 837, 838	Garage and Routes originally Transdev until October 1, 2023. Transferred to New Jersey Transit after.
Newton Avenue	350 Newton Avenue, Camden	316 (split with Egg Harbor, Washington Twp), 317, 404, 405, 407, 409, 413, 414, 417, 418, 419, 450, 451, 452, 453, 455, 457	Newly built and expanded garage opened in 1994 replacing the old Camden garage on the same site, as well as the Maple Shade and Riverside garages.
Washington Township	6000 Black Horse Pike, Turnersville	313 (split with Egg Harbor), 315 (split with Egg Harbor), 316 (split with Egg Harbor, Newtown Av), 400, 401, 402, 403, 406, 408, 410, 412, 459, 463, 551, 554	Replaced the old Turnersville Garage on the same site in 1990.

== Contract operations ==
These companies operate service under contract to New Jersey Transit. Service is provided using New Jersey Transit-branded buses.

Operator	Location	Routes
Community Coach	160 Route 17 North, Paramus	351, 353
Academy Bus Lines	600 S River St, Hackensack	702, 705, 707, 709, 722, 744, 746, 748, 751, 752, 753, 755, 756, 758, 762, 772, 780
Salem County Transit	88 Industrial Park Road; Pennsville	468
Suburban Trails	750 Somerset Street, New Brunswick	801, 802, 803, 804, 805, 810, 811, 813, 814, 815, 817, 818, 819, 822
Trans-Bridge Lines	2012 Industrial Drive, Bethlehem, Pennsylvania	890, 891

== See also ==
- South Jersey Transportation Authority
- NJ Transit Rail Operations
