= New York Airport Service =

Bus company in New York City

- Parent: Private One of New York LLC
- Headquarters: 15 Second Avenue, Brooklyn, NY
- Locale: New York City
- Service type: Express bus service
- Routes: 3
- Operator: GO Airlink Shuttle
- Website: www.nyairportservice.com

New York Airport Service is a privately-owned bus company that specializes in providing transportation services between the New York metropolitan area and Manhattan. The service is meant to provide a middle ground between the cheaper, but slower forms of government-owned public transportation (MTA Regional Bus Operations, New York City Subway, or Long Island Rail Road) and the quick but expensive taxicabs (which generally reach Manhattan for a flat fee near $50).

New York Airport Service previously held a permit with the Port Authority of New York and New Jersey, the operator of the airports, allowing it to operate express motorcoaches between the airports and Manhattan. Scheduled stops were at John F. Kennedy International Airport, LaGuardia Airport, New York Penn Station, Grand Central Terminal, and the Port Authority Bus Terminal. Various Manhattan hotels were also served through reservations.

In 2013, New York Airport Service was succeeded by the NYC Airporter service, which is owned by Veolia Transportation. However, NYAS continues to provide transportation services to and from the airports through its sister company, GO Airlink Shuttle, utilizing vans for this purpose.
