= Carefree Bus =

Private bus company in New Jersey, US

- Headquarters: 45 Somerset Place
- Locale: Clifton, New Jersey
- Service type: Charter bus
- Website: www.carefreebus.com

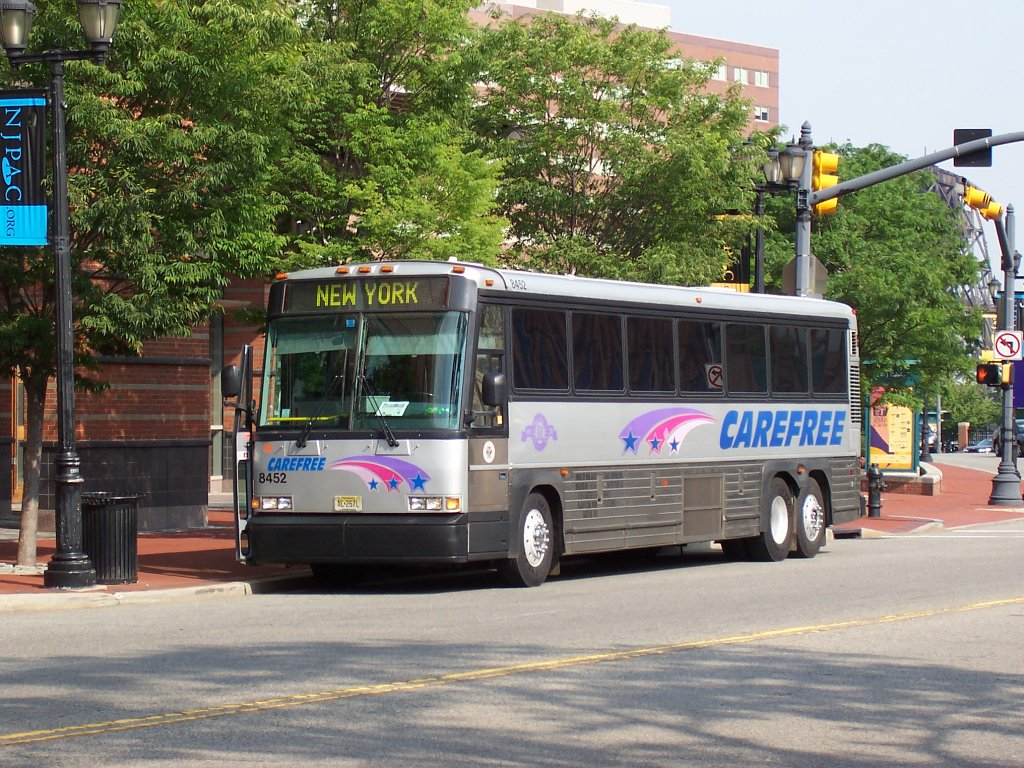
A Carefree MCI D4000

Carefree Bus Tours is a private bus company in Essex County, New Jersey. The carrier uses a fleet of coach-style buses for charter services.
