= Olympia Trails =

American commercial intercity bus service

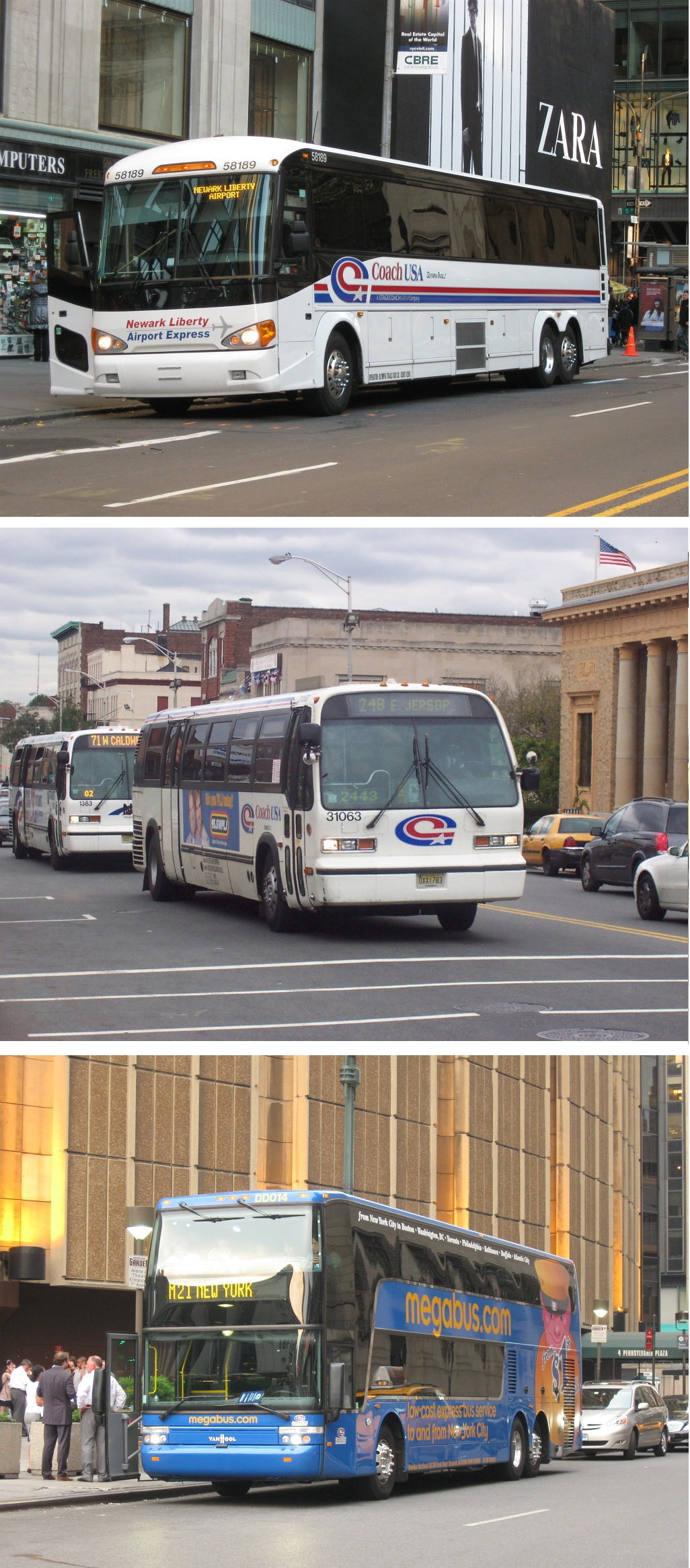
- Parent: Coach USA
- Headquarters: 349 1 Street; Elizabeth, NJ 07206
- Locale: Northeastern United States
- Service area: Central Jersey (transit service)
- Service type: Commuter bus service, contract service, intercity service
- Routes: 1
- Operator: Coach USA: Olympia Trails (Newark Airport Express)
- Chief executive: James Rutherford (except Megabus); Dale Moser (Megabus)
- Website: www.coachusa.com/olympia

Olympia Trails, which used to also do business as Megabus Northeast, LLC (Operator of Megabus), ONE/Independent Bus, and Red and Tan bus, is a bus operator serving northern New Jersey with local and commuter bus service. It has been owned by Coach USA since 1998. Coach USA has been owned by Renco Group since 2024.

== Routes ==
=== Current operations ===
Olympia Trails operates only one service, the Newark Airport Express, which operates between Midtown Manhattan and Newark Liberty International Airport at 15-minute intervals throughout the day. This route was acquired from New Jersey Transit (NJT) in 1997, previously numbered 300.

=== Former operations ===
==== Red & Tan brand ====
Under the Red & Tan brand, Coach USA operated bus routes in Jersey City, Bayonne, Staten Island and to the PABT that have since been discontinued, folded into other lines, or taken over by other operators.

Route	Terminals		Major streets	History
3	Journal Square; Transportation Center	Jersey City; Merritt Street and Ocean Avenue	Garfield Avenue, Baldwin Avenue	Formerly operated by Central Avenue IBOA.; Discontinued in August 2007.
4	Jersey City; Merritt Street and Ocean Avenue	Jersey City; Newport Centre Mall (some trips) or Grove Street (full-time)	Pacific Street, Ocean Avenue	Formerly operated by Lafayette & Greenville IBOA.; Discontinued on November 6, 2011.; Operated by the Montgomery & West Side IBOA until March 2, 2019, when it was discontinued.
5 6	Journal Square; Transportation Center	Hoboken / Weehawken; 19th Street	Observer Highway, Washington Street	Formerly operated by Downtown Bus Co. and later by Lafayette & Greenville.; Discontinued 2007.
10 99S	10: Journal Square; Transportation Center; 99S: Jersey City; Merritt Street and Ocean Avenue Port Authority Bus Terminal, New York	10: Bayonne - 3 Street and JFK Boulevard; 99S: Bayonne - 9th Street-Congress Street	JFK Boulevard (both), Central Avenue (99S only)	Formerly operated by South Hudson County Boulevard Bus Owners Association, and later by Drogin Bus.; Route 99S discontinued on November 6, 2011. Now New Jersey Transit bus route 119.; Route 10 taken over by New Jersey Transit & Academy Bus (operator) on April 8, 2012, after threat of cancellation.
11	Journal Square; Transportation Center	Liberty State Park; Park and Ride	Montgomery Street	Discontinued in 2004.
16	Journal Square; Transportation Center	Jersey City; Newport Centre Mall	Monticello Avenue, Communipaw Avenue, Pacific Avenue	Formerly operated by Lafayette & Greenville IBOA.; Discontinued in January 2008.
31	Exchange Place	Hoboken; Hoboken Terminal	Grove Street/Erie Street	Formerly operated by Public Service Coordinated Transport.; Discontinued in 2002.; Alternate service available on Hudson-Bergen Light Rail.
33	Lower Manhattan, New York; Wall Street	Bayonne; 3 Street and JFK Boulevard	JFK Boulevard, New Jersey Turnpike Newark Bay Extension	Discontinued in the late 1990s.; Alternate service available on New Jersey Transit bus route 120.
99	Jersey City; Merritt Street and Ocean Avenue	Journal Square; Transportation Center	Ocean Avenue, Summit Avenue	Formerly Lafayette & Greenville Bus' #3 Ocean Avenue line.; Discontinued in February 2008. Now New Jersey Transit bus route 6.
122	Hoboken; Hoboken Terminal	Eltingville, Staten Island (New York); Hylan Boulevard and Richmond Avenue	Interstate 78, Route 440, Bayonne Bridge, Hylan Boulevard, Clove Road, and Forest Avenue	Discontinued in mid-2005.
144	Hoboken; Hoboken Terminal	Arden Heights, Staten Island (New York); Arthur Kill Road and West Shore Expressway	Interstate 78, Route 440, Bayonne Bridge, Richmond Avenue, Hylan Boulevard, and Arden Avenue	Discontinued in January 2007.
231	Port Liberté	Jersey City Heights	Garfield Avenue, Bergen Avenue, Baldwin Avenue and Central Avenue	Formerly operated by Central Avenue IBOA.; Discontinued in January 2006.; Section north of Journal Square now part of the #88 & #119 lines.; Alternate service south of Journal Square available on New Jersey Transit bus route 87.

==== ONE/Independent Bus ====
ONE/Independent Bus provided local service on routes centered in Essex County, New Jersey and Union County, New Jersey until October 2023, when it shut down. All routes under ONE bus were taken over by New Jersey Transit. All routes owned by New Jersey Transit were transferred to NJT on August 17, 2024.

Route	Terminals		Major streets	Zones	Notes
24	Orange; Main Street and Erie Loop	Elizabeth; Jersey Gardens mall	Harrison Street, East Jersey Street (B trips only); Scotland Road, Elizabeth Avenue (A trips only); Central Avenue, Frelinghuysen/Newark Avenue	Newark/Elizabeth boundary; Grove Street	NJ Transit and Academy Express took over on October 8, 2023
31	Newark; Newark Penn Station	Newark South Orange Avenue and Dover Street	South Orange Avenue	Newark/South Orange boundary; Service to/from both Livingston and Maplewood eliminated January 2018; Some trips go as far as South Orange center	NJT took over on October 8, 2023
44	Newark; Newark Penn Station	Orange; Orange rail station	Scotland Road, Tremont Avenue, Central Avenue	Grove Street	NJT took over on October 8, 2023

==== ONE/Independent Bus, Routes owned by New Jersey Transit ====
Route	Terminals		Major Streets	History
2	Journal Square Transportation Center	Secaucus Junction	Kennedy Blvd, County Avenue, Secaucus Road (2R variant only), Meadowlands Parkway, and Seaview Parkway	Formerly ran under Academy Bus Lines subsidiary, Number 22 Hillside LLC/Corp.; Some trips deviate to serve the USPS Bulk Mail Center.
84	Journal Square Transportation Center	North Bergen Bergenline Avenue and JFK Blvd	Palisade Avenue, Bergenline Avenue (both directions between JFK and 48 Street, southbound only from 48 Street to 1 Street), New York Avenue (northbound only from 1 Street to 48 Street), Park Avenue (84P variant only; between 31 Street and 79 Street)	Was run under NJ Transit Bus Operations until June 26, 2022, when the route was transferred over to ONE Bus in a route swap.
88	Journal Square Transportation Center	North Bergen Bergenline Avenue and JFK Blvd	Kennedy Blvd, Central Avenue (88C variant only; between Journal Square and 8 Street)	Formerly ran under Academy Bus Lines subsidiary, Number 22 Hillside LLC/Corp.
