= Suburban Transit =

Bus operator in New Jersey, United States

Coach USA Suburban Transit

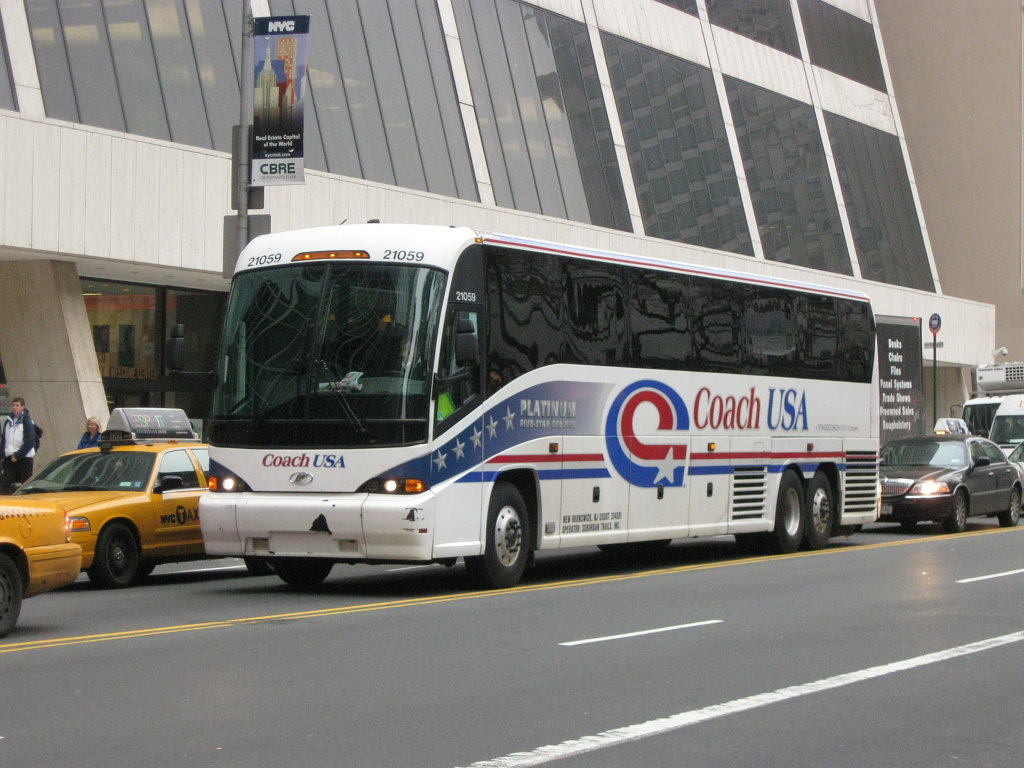
- #21059 runs past Bryant Park in Manhattan.
- Parent: Coach USA
- Founded: 1941
- Headquarters: 750 Somerset Street, New Brunswick, NJ 08901
- Locale: Central Jersey
- Service area: Middlesex, Mercer, and Somerset counties
- Service type: Line run Contract operations Charter bus service
- Routes: 5 directly controlled 3 under contract
- Fleet: 140
- General Manager: William Pelzer
- Website: Suburban Transit

Suburban Transit is a bus operator in central New Jersey that provides commuter bus service between Mercer, Somerset, and Middlesex County and New York City and local bus service along the New Jersey Route 27 and U.S. Route 130 in Middlesex County. It also operates the Metropark, Plainfield, Monmouth, and Middlesex County Local Routes for New Jersey Transit. Suburban Transit is owned by Coach USA. Coach USA has been owned by Renco Group since 2024.

== Routes ==
| Route | Termini | |
|---|---|---|
| Dunellen Local (rush hours only) | Dunellen | Kendall Park, or New Brunswick |
| Line 100 | Port Authority Bus Terminal | Princeton; Nassau Street and Palmer Square |
| Line 200 (weekdays only) | New York; United Nations plaza | Hillsborough Hillsborough Promenade (weekdays only) |
| Line 300 (some trips operated by Academy Bus) | Port Authority Bus Terminal | S. Brunswick Exit 8A Park & Ride (full-time); E. Windsor Windsor Heights Shopping Center (full-time); Monroe Whittingham Road (rush hours only); Plainsboro Town Center (rush hours only) |
| Line 350 (weekdays only) | Jersey City; Newport Centre | Twin Rivers Abbington Drive |
| Line 400 | Port Authority Bus Terminal | East Brunswick Transportation Center (full-time); Old Stage and Summerhill Roads (rush hours only) |
| Line 500 (rush hours only) | New York; United Nations plaza | Kendall Park; Shopping Center, or New Brunswick; Garage, or Milltown, or East Brunswick; Transportation Center |
| Line 600 (rush hours only) | New York; Wall Street area | East Brunswick; Transportation Center, or Princeton; Palmer Square |
| Line 700 (weekends only) | Atlantic City; Caesars, or Bally's | Somerville, or South Plainfield |
