= DeCamp Bus Lines =

Bus company of New Jersey

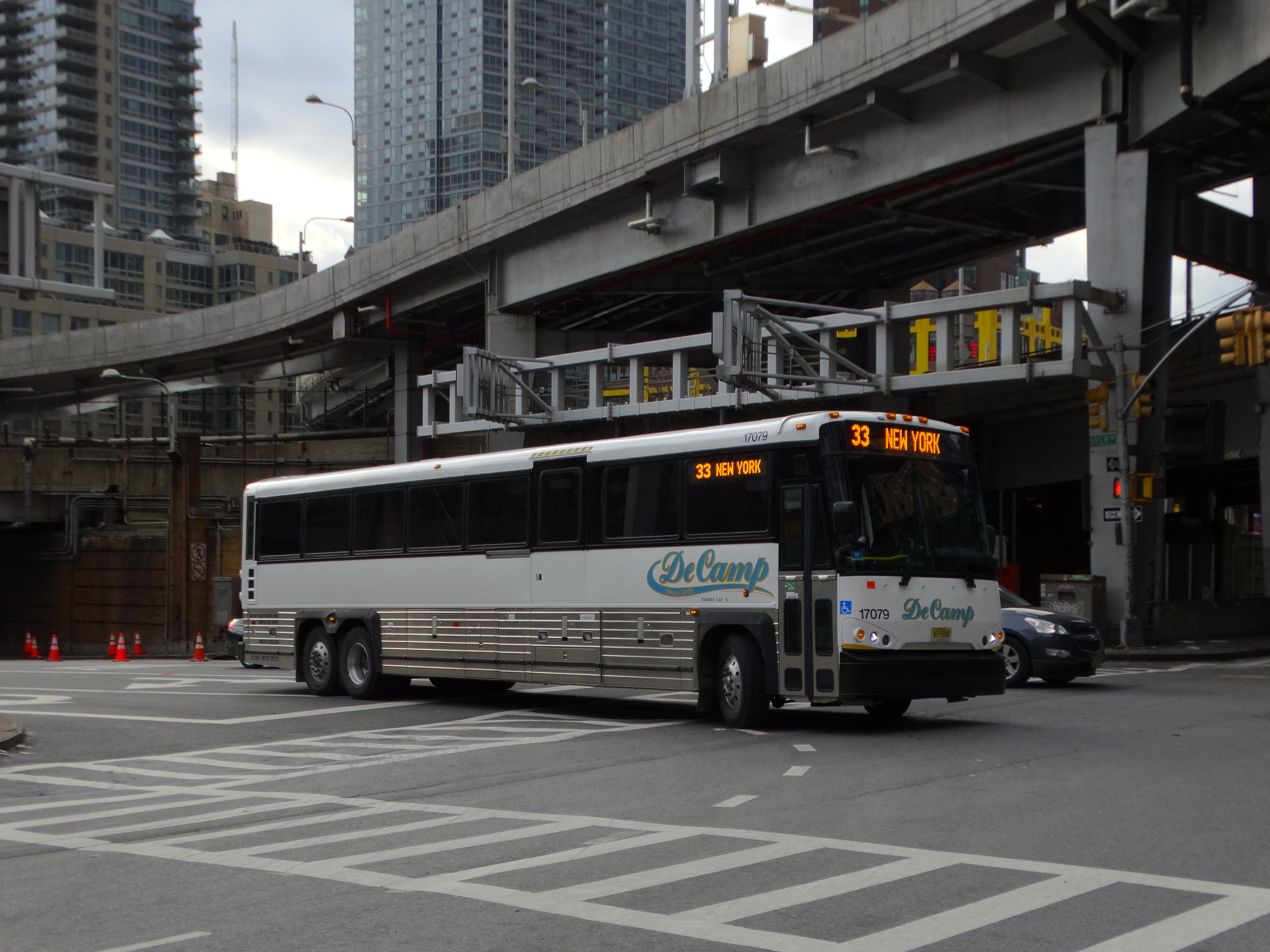
- Ex-DeCamp #17079 turning to enter PABT on Former Route 33. This bus has returned to New Jersey Transit.
- Founded: 1870
- Ceased operation: February 28, 2025
- Headquarters: 101 Greenwood Avenue; Montclair, New Jersey 07042
- Locale: Northern New Jersey
- Service area: Essex and Passaic Counties, New Jersey
- Service type: Charter
- Fleet: 30
- Daily ridership: 7282 (weekday, 2006)
- Chief executive: Gary Pard
- Website: DeCamp.com

DeCamp Bus Lines was a bus company located in Montclair, New Jersey. It served Essex County and Passaic County with commuter routes and charter services. Until 2023, DeCamp also operated commuter line-run services to and from Manhattan. The company ceased operations on February 28, 2025.

== History ==
DeCamp was founded in 1870, starting out as a stage-coach company.

The company ran until February 28, 2025, when they ceased operations.

== COVID-19 pandemic ==
DeCamp suspended service on March 25, 2020, due to the COVID-19 pandemic in New Jersey.

DeCamp resumed activities in June, but was again curtailed on August 7, 2020, due to low and unsustainable ridership.

In May 2021, DeCamp began to resume operations once again, starting with charter services. On June 14, 2021, commuter services also resumed on a limited weekday schedule.

On March 20, 2023, DeCamp announced it would cease operating its commuter services lines after April 7, citing unsustainably low ridership because many of their former customers were now working from home instead of commuting to Midtown Manhattan.

== Former commuter routes ==
There were no fixed stops other than terminals, buses could hail to board; riders could request a stop to exit. Local passengers within New Jersey were not transported on any line except for the 32. According to the company, it normally carried up to 7,000 passengers per day. However, these numbers dwindled after the COVID-19 pandemic.

While all lines were indefinitely and temporarily suspended at the onset of the COVID-19 crisis, the 32 and 88 lines were never brought back after commuter services were reinstated. As such, these routes were unofficially discontinued since 2020, and permanently with the decision by DeCamp to drop the commuter routes. All other routes were brought back to some extent, and permanently discontinued in April 2023. Some of the routes were rebranded and operated under New Jersey Transit. Buses that NJ Transit owned were sent back.

Route	Terminal A	Via	Terminal B
32 (weekdays only)	Port Authority Bus Terminal	Paterson Plank Road; Ridge Road; Belleville Turnpike; Centre Street; Kingsland Street	Nutley; Kingsland Street and Darling Avenue
33	Port Authority Bus Terminal (full-time); Lower Manhattan; Wall Street (rush hour service inbound only)	Passaic Avenue; Broad Street or Grove Street; Bloomfield Avenue	W. Caldwell or Montclair; Essex Mall
44	Port Authority Bus Terminal	Ridge Road; Belleville Turnpike; Heller Parkway/Franklin Street	Bloomfield; Franklin Street and Montgomery Street
66 (C, MU, and R weekdays only)	Port Authority Bus Terminal	Route 3 Valley Road; Park Street; Montclair State University (some trips); Harrison Avenue; Eagle Rock Avenue (R trips only); Prospect Avenue (R trips only)	W. Orange; Mississippi Loop (full-time); Montclair; Park Street and Bloomfield Avenue OR Watchung Plaza (some trips); W. Orange; Crown View Apartments (CV trips only); W. Caldwell; Essex Mall (R trips only)
88 (weekdays only)	Port Authority Bus Terminal	Broad Street; Prospect Street	Orange; Central Avenue and Evergreen Place OR Scotland Road
99 (rush hours only)	Port Authority Bus Terminal	Ridge Road/Kearny Avenue/Frank E. Rodgers Boulevard	Harrison; Rodgers Boulevard and Harrison Avenue

== Map ==
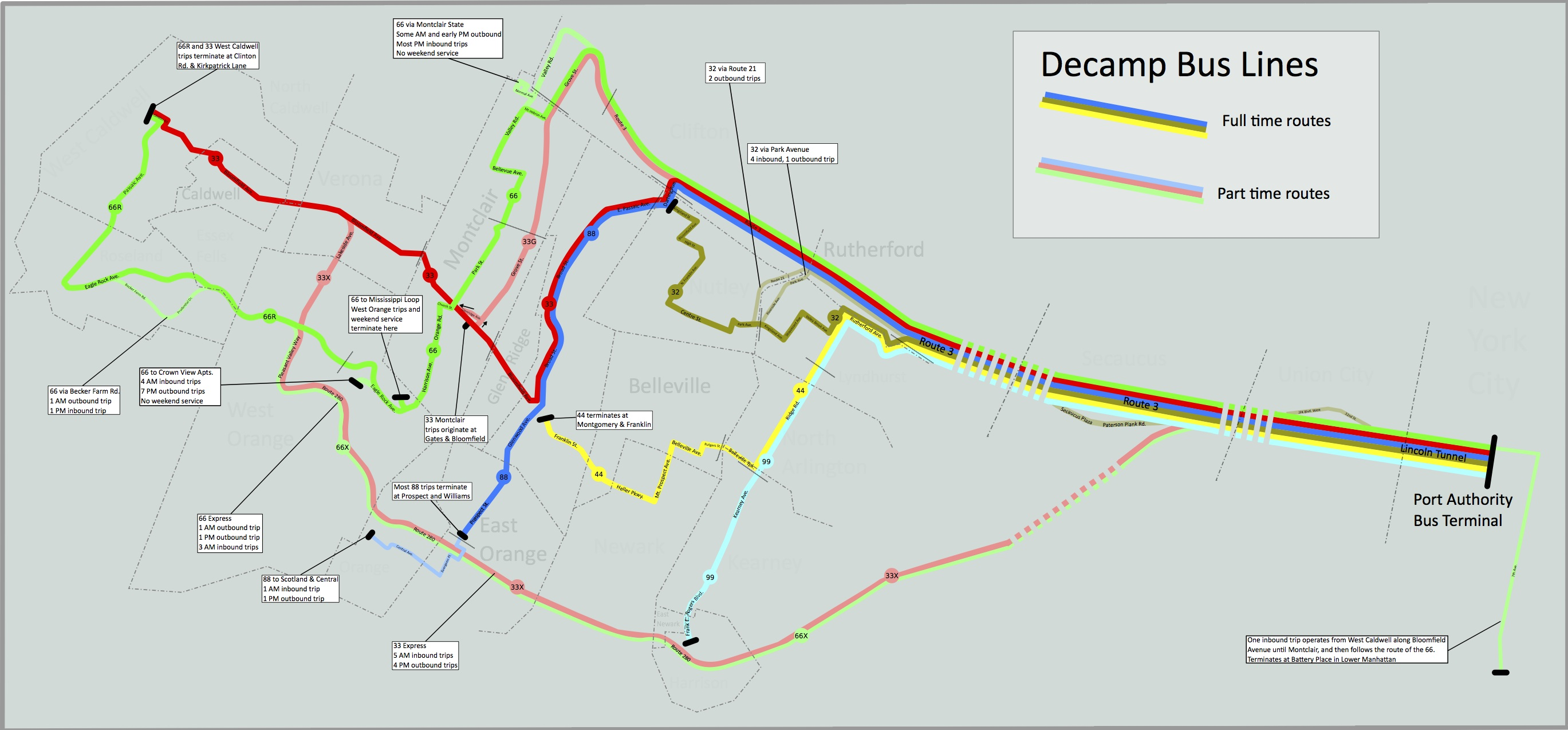
Map of Former DeCamp Routes, 2019
