= Coach USA =

Bus transit holding company in North America

Coach USA, LLC

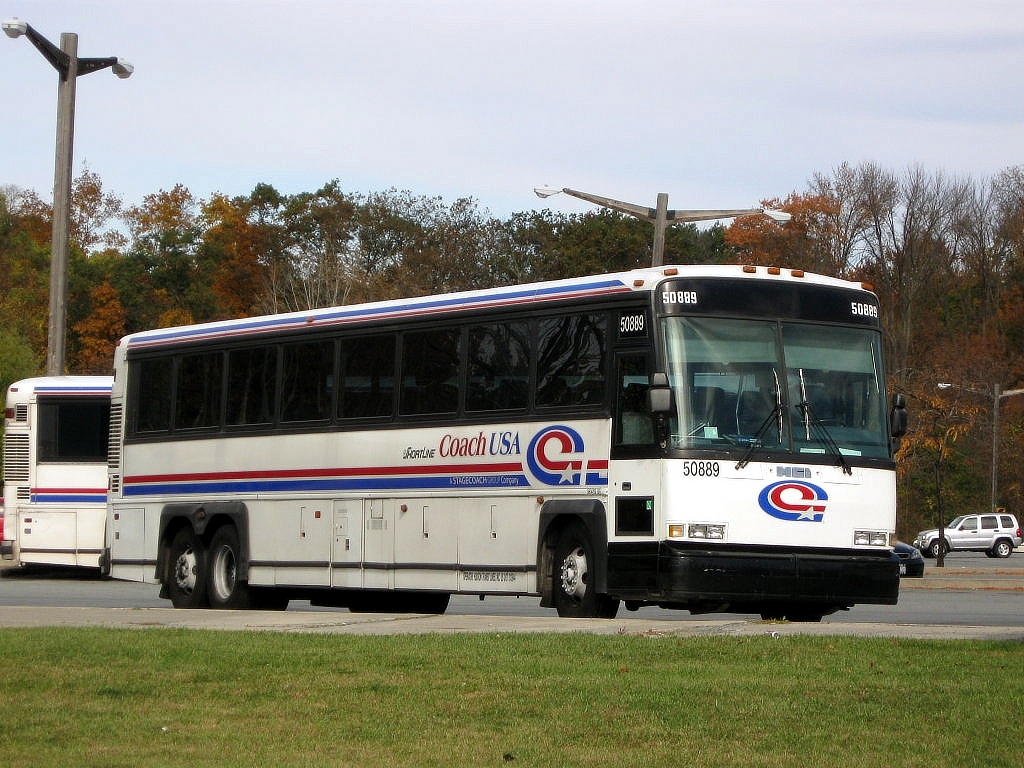
- A Coach USA bus in Newburgh, New York
- Parent: Renco Group; (2024–present)
- Founded: 1995; 31 years ago
- Headquarters: 160 NJ Route 17 North; Paramus, New Jersey 07652
- Locale: United States
- Service area: New York, Pittsburgh and Chicago metropolitan areas, Southern Tier of New York, southern Wisconsin
- Service type: Local, commuter, charter, contract, and yellow school bus service, Megabus
- Routes: Northeast Division (excluding Megabus): 55 directly owned; 43 under contract; North Central Division (excluding Megabus and school buses): 9 directly owned; 4 under contract; Megabus: 11 directly owned; 1 under contract
- Operator: Various Coach USA companies, see #Operating companies below
- Chief executive: Derrick Waters
- Website: www.coachusa.com

Coach USA, LLC is a holding company for several operators of intercity bus service, local and commuter bus transit, sightseeing buses, school buses, and charter bus services in the United States and Canada. It is owned by Renco Group.

Coach USA's operations consist primarily of scheduled services in the New York metropolitan area and the Chicago metropolitan area, with charter operations near Pittsburgh and scheduled operations in the Southern Tier of New York and southern Wisconsin as well as Toronto and Montreal.

== History ==
=== 20th century ===
Coach USA traces its history back to 1922 as Lackawanna Bus, which provided bus service in Bergen County, New Jersey, and later along the Jersey Shore and other places in the New York metropolitan area. It was founded by Jim and Denis Gallagher.

Community Coach began operations in 1958 under Denis's brother, John. It took over the operations of Consolidated Bus Lines, using the operating authority of another company that the Gallagher family had purchased in Paramus, New Jersey, three years prior.

Coach USA acquired and owned 6 companies: Suburban Trails, Community Coach, Leisure Line, and Adventure Trails in New Jersey, Grosvenor Bus (Gray Line of San Francisco) and Arrow Stage Line in Arizona (not to be confused with unaffiliated Arrow Stage Lines).

In 1995, Frank Gallagher sold the firms to Notre Capital Ventures II, L.P., which recapitalized the company. At that time, the company was valued at $88.4 million and had 760 buses.

In March 1996, Richard Kristinik (1939-2017), formerly a partner at Arthur Andersen, was named chairman and CEO of the company.

In May 1996, the company became a public company via an initial public offering, selling 3,600,000 shares at $14 each.

By late 1998, Coach USA had completed more than 70 acquisitions since its IPO.

During this time, the Gallagher family started another company, Student Transportation of America, based in the area of its Coast Cities operation.

In November 1998, Kristinik retired, and was succeeded by Larry King.

By 1999, Coach USA had about 9,000 buses operating in 35 states, Canada, and Mexico.

Stagecoach Group purchased Coach USA in mid-1999 for $1.88 billion. Stagecoach also took on $630 million in debt held by Coach USA. Frank Gallagher became CEO of Coach USA.

In 2000, the company announced a partnership with Six Flags Theme Parks whereby Coach USA offered special rates to customers of the amusement parks.

=== 21st century ===
The company reported losses due to the decline in travel after the September 11 attacks. It then reduced its Houston headquarters staff by 40%, eliminated 10% of all non-driver employees, and took 330 buses off the road. By the end of 2001, Coach USA had cut costs by $25 million.

In December 2002, Stagecoach sold its companies in New England to Peter Pan Bus Lines.

In June 2003, Companies in the Southwest, West, and Rocky Mountain regions were sold to KKR to form Coach America.

Companies in the southeastern United States were sold to Lincolnshire Management, rebranded as American Coach Lines (which was merged with Coach America in 2006).

In July 2003, the contract transit division, Progressive Transportation, was sold to competitor First Transit for $22.5 million.

As a result of the sale of most of Coach USA's operations, the company's headquarters were relocated from Texas to the Community Coach garage in Paramus, New Jersey.

In April 2006, Stagecoach launched Megabus as a subsidiary of Coach USA.

In 2012, when Coach America declared bankruptcy, Coach USA re-acquired 8 companies it previously sold, along with Lakefront/Hopkins in Ohio.

In April 2019, Stagecoach sold all of its North American operations to Variant Equity Advisors for $271 million.

In December 2019, Coach USA closed Chicago Trolley & Double Decker Co. and Airport Supersaver.

Coach USA closed Lakefront Lines in Ohio and Central Cab in Pennsylvania in 2020, due to the COVID-19 pandemic.

In June 2021, Community Transportation Inc., a Coach USA company, received a $19 million contract to operate certain public bus lines in New Jersey previously operated by Number 22 Hillside LLC/Corp.

In June 2024, Coach USA filed for Chapter 11 bankruptcy, blaming corporate impact caused by the COVID-19 pandemic. The bankruptcy was later converted to a Chapter 7 bankruptcy liquidation.

Avalon Transportation acquired Lenzner, Kerrville, All West and ACL Atlanta. Wynne Transportation acquired Powder River and the Butler Motor Transit shop.

Effective August 2024, Peter Pan Bus Lines took over Megabus operations in the Northeastern United States. The company also stopped operating 20 routes in New Jersey; the routes were taken over by Academy Bus and New Jersey Transit.

In November 2024, Renco Group acquired the remainder of the company.

Effective September 2025, Coach USA closed its operations and facility in Elko, Nevada, leading to 149 job losses.

== Operating companies ==
Coach USA owns the following operating companies:

- Dillon's Bus Service (Hanover, Maryland)
- Megabus - in North America
- Olympia Trails (Elizabeth, New Jersey)
- Coach Canada (Toronto and, via Gray Line Montreal, Montreal)
- Rockland Coaches (Westwood, New Jersey)
- Short Line Bus (Chester, Orange County, New York)
- Suburban Transit (New Brunswick, New Jersey)
- Van Galder Bus Company (Janesville, Wisconsin)
- Wisconsin Coach Lines/Coach USA Airport Express (Waukesha, Wisconsin)

== Safety incidents ==
- In December 2025, a Coach USA bus slammed into a building in Midtown Manhattan, injuring 1 person.
- In March 2026, a Coach USA bus hit a railroad bridge on U.S. Route 202, in Mahwah, New Jersey, losing part of its roof.
